= Index of articles related to Hong Kong =

Articles related to Hong Kong include:

== 0–9 ==
- 123 Democratic Alliance
- 1936 Hong Kong municipal election
- 1937 Hong Kong municipal election
- 1939 Hong Kong municipal election
- 1940 Hong Kong municipal election
- 1950s in Hong Kong
- 1952 Hong Kong municipal election
- 1952 in Hong Kong
- 1953 Hong Kong municipal election
- 1954 Hong Kong municipal election
- 1955 Hong Kong municipal election
- 1956 Hong Kong riots
- 1960s in Hong Kong
- 1966 Hong Kong riots
- 1967 Hong Kong riots
- 1981 Hong Kong riots
- 1970s in Hong Kong
- 1980s in Hong Kong
- 1987 in Hong Kong
- 1990s in Hong Kong
- 1992 in Hong Kong
- 1994 in Hong Kong
- 1995 in Hong Kong
- 1998 in Hong Kong
- 1999 in Hong Kong
- 2000s in Hong Kong
- 2004 in Hong Kong
- 2004 Indian Ocean earthquake on Hong Kong
- 2005 in Hong Kong
- 2006 in Hong Kong
- 2007 in Hong Kong
- 2008 in Hong Kong
- 2010 in Hong Kong
- 2010s in Hong Kong
- 2010 Hong Kong democracy protests
- 2012 in Hong Kong television
- 2013 in Hong Kong
- 2014 in Hong Kong
- 2014 Hong Kong protests
- 2015 in Hong Kong
- 2016 in Hong Kong
- 2017 in Hong Kong
- 2017 imprisonment of Hong Kong democracy activists
- 2018 in Hong Kong
- 2019 in Hong Kong
- 2019 Hong Kong extradition bill
- 2019–2020 Hong Kong protests
- 2020s in Hong Kong
- 2020 in Hong Kong
- 2020 in Hong Kong film
- 2021 in Hong Kong
- 2022 in Hong Kong
- 2022–23 in Hong Kong football
- 2023 in Hong Kong
- 2024 in Hong Kong
- 2025 in Hong Kong
- 2046
- 3 (company)
- 3 Hong Kong
- 62nd Venice International Film Festival
- 7.1 People Pile

== A ==
- A Better Tomorrow
- A Chau
- A Chinese Ghost Story
- A Chinese Ghost Story II
- A Chinese Ghost Story III
- A Chinese Ghost Story: The Tsui Hark Animation
- A Chinese Ghost Story (2011 film)
- A Kung Ngam
- A Kung Ngam (constituency)
- Aberdeen Channel
- Aberdeen Channel Bridge
- Aberdeen, Hong Kong
- Aberdeen (Hong Kong constituency)
- Aberdeen Praya Road
- Aberdeen Street
- ABRS Management and Technology Institute
- Action Blue Sky Campaign
- Action Committee for Defending the Diaoyu Islands
- Adamasta Channel
- Adamasta Rock
- Admiralty
- Admiralty MTR Station
- Advanced Level Examination, Hong Kong (HKALE)
- Advanced Supplementary Level Examination, Hong Kong (HKASLE)
- Agriculture in Hong Kong
- Agriculture, Fisheries and Conservation Department
- Akers-Jones, David
- AIG Tower
- Air Hong Kong
- Air pollution in Hong Kong
- Airport Authority Hong Kong
- Airport Core Programme
- Airport Core Programme Exhibition Centre
- Airport Road, Hong Kong
- airports and heliports in Hong Kong, List of
- Airport, Hong Kong International
- Airport Express
- Aldrich Bay
- Allegations of Hong Kong Police Force misconduct surrounding the 2019–20 Hong Kong protests
- am730
- Amah Rock
- Amoy Food Limited
- Amoy Gardens
- Andrade, Fernão Pires de
- Anstruther, Robert Hamilton
- Antiquities and Monuments Office
- Antiquities and Monuments Ordinance
- Ap Chau
- Ap Chau Mei Pak Tun Pai
- Ap Chau Pak Tun Pai
- Ap Lei Chau
- Ap Lei Pai
- Ap Lo Chun
- Ap Tan Pai
- Ap Tau Pai
- Apliu Street
- apm Millennium City 5
- Apple Daily
- April Fifth Action
- areas of Hong Kong, List of
- Hong Kong Museum of Art
- Ashes of Time
- Asia Television (ATV)
- AsiaWorld-Expo
- Argyle Street, Hong Kong
- Audit Bureau of Circulations, Hong Kong
- Austin Road
- Austin, John Cardiner
- Avenue of Stars
- Aviation history of Hong Kong

== B ==
- Baden-Powell International House
- Bank of America (Asia)
- Bank of China (Hong Kong)
- Bank of China Group
- Bank of China Tower
- Bank of Communications Hong Kong Branch
- Bank of East Asia
- Banknotes of the Hong Kong dollar
- Baptist Lui Ming Choi Secondary School
- Baptist University, Hong Kong (HKBU or BU)
- Barker, George Digby
- Basic Law, Hong Kong
- Basic Law Article 23, Hong Kong
- Basic Law Article 45, Hong Kong
- Basic Law Article 45 Concern Group
- Basic Law Article 46, Hong Kong
- Bắt đầu từ nay
- Battery Path
- Battle of Hong Kong
- Bauhinia
- Bauhinia blakeana
- Bay Islet
- Beaches of Hong Kong
- Beacon Hill
- Belcher Bay
- Belcher's Street
- Belgian Bank
- Bernacchi, Brook Antony
- Beyond (band)
- The Big Buddha (Hong Kong)
- Big Wave Bay
- Bishonen
- Black, Robert Brown
- Black, Wilsone
- Blake, Henry Arthur
- Bluff Island
- BNP Paribas Hong Kong
- Boundary Street
- Bowen, George
- Bowring, John
- Bonham Road
- Bonham, Samuel George
- Bonham Strand
- Boundary Street
- Bowen Road
- Boy'z
- Braemar Hill
- Brand Hong Kong
- Brandon Learning Centre
- Brands and Products Expo, Hong Kong
- Breaker Reef
- Bremer, James John Gordon
- Bride's Pool
- Brigade of Gurkhas
- British consular protection enjoyed by BN(O) passport holders outside the PRC and the UK
- British Forces Overseas Hong Kong
- British National (Overseas)
- British Dependent Territories citizenship
- British Nationality (Hong Kong) Act 1990
- British Nationality (Hong Kong) Act 1997
- British nationality law and Hong Kong
- British Nationality (Hong Kong) Selection Scheme
- Broadview Garden
- Broadway Cinematheque
- Bronze Bauhinia Star
- Brothers, The
- Bruce, Frederick William Adolphus
- Buddhism in Hong Kong
- Buddhist Association, Hong Kong
- Buddhist Fat Ho Memorial College
- Buddhist Hospital, Hong Kong
- Buddhist Sin Tak College
- Buddhist Tai Hung College
- Buddhist Wong Fung Ling College
- Buddhist Yip Kei Nam Memorial College
- buildings and structures in Hong Kong, List of
- Bun Bei Chau
- Burgess, Claude Bramall
- business schools in Asia, List of
- bus route numbering, Hong Kong
- Bus spotting
- bus transport in Hong Kong, History of
- Bus Uncle, The
- Bute Street
- Butterfly Valley
- Butterfly Valley Road

== C ==
- Cable TV Hong Kong
- Café de Coral
- Caine Road
- Caine, William
- Caldecott, Andrew
- Camellia crapnelliana
- Camellia granthamiana
- Camellia hongkongensis
- Cameron, William Gordon
- Canal Road
- Canton Road
- Cantonese Braille
- Cantonese grammar
- Cantonese, Hong Kong
- Cantonese
- Cantonese opera
- Cantonese people in Hong Kong
- Cantonese restaurant
- Cantonese Romanisation, Hong Kong Government
- Cantopop
- Cape D'Aguilar
- car number plates, Hong Kong
- Caritas Hong Kong
- Caritas Medical Centre
- Caritas St. Joseph Secondary School
- Cart noodle
- Castle Peak
- Castle Peak Bay
- Castle Peak Hospital
- Castle Peak Road
- Cater, Jack
- Cathay Dragon
- Cathay Pacific
- Causes of the 2019–2020 Hong Kong protests
- Causeway Bay
- Causeway Road
- Celestial Movies
- Census in Hong Kong
- Centamap
- Center, The
- Center for E-Commerce Infrastructure Development
- Central, Hong Kong
- Central and Western District
- Central and Western Democratic Power
- Central Library, Hong Kong
- Central Market
- Central–Mid-Levels escalator
- Central Plaza (Hong Kong)
- Central Police Station
- Certificate of Education Examination, Hong Kong (HKCEE)
- CCC Yenching College
- Chai Wan
- Chai Wan Kok
- Chai Wan Park
- Chai Wan Road
- Cham Shan Monastery
- Chan, Anson
- Chan Lai So Chun Memorial School
- Chan, Peter Ho-sun
- Cha chaan teng
- channels in Hong Kong, List of
- Char siu
- Chartered Bank of India, Australia and China
- Chartered Secretaries (Hong Kong)
- Chater, Catchick Paul
- Chater Garden
- Chater House
- Chater Road
- Chatham Road
- Chau Tsai (disambiguation)
- Chau Tsai Kok
- Che Kung (God of Protection)
- Che Kung Miu
- Che Lei Pai
- Che people
- Chek Chau
- Chek Lap Kok
- Chen, Kelly
- Chen Hsong
- Cheng, Albert
- Cheng, Sammi
- Cheong-Leen, Hilton
- Cherry Street, Hong Kong
- Cheung Chau
- Cheung Chau Bun Festival
- Cheung Chi Cheong Memorial Primary School
- Cheung Ching Estate
- Cheung Ching Estate Community Centre
- Cheung Fat Estate
- Cheung, Fernando
- Cheung Hang Estate
- Cheung Hong Estate
- Cheung, Jacky
- Cheung Kong Holdings
- Cheung Kong Centre
- Cheung, Leslie
- Cheung, Maggie
- Cheung On Estate
- Cheung Pei Shan Road
- Cheung Po Tsai
- Cheung Sha Wan
- Cheung Sha Wan Road
- Cheung Shue Tau
- Cheung Tsing Bridge
- Cheung Tsing Highway
- Cheung Tsing Tunnel
- Cheung Wang Estate
- Chi Lin Nunnery
- Chi Ma Wan
- Chiba Bank
- Chief Commissioner, Hong Kong
- Chief Executive of Hong Kong
- Chief Scout of Hong Kong
- Chief Executive election, Hong Kong
- Chief Secretary for Administration
- Ch'ien Kuo Fung, Raymond
- China Daily Hong Kong Edition
- China Hong Kong City
- China Light and Power
- China Motor Bus
- Chinachem
- Chinese nationality law in Hong Kong
- Chinese Serial
- Chinese Temples Committee
- Chinese University of Hong Kong (CUHK)
- Ching Cheong
- Ching Cheung Road
- Ching Chung Koon
- Ching Nga Court
- Ching Shing Court
- Ching Wah Court
- Chiu, Samson
- Chiuchow cuisine
- Chiyu Banking Corporation
- Choy Gar
- Choy Li Fut
- Choi Sai Woo Park
- Chong Hing Bank
- Chow Shouson
- Chu Kong Passenger Transport
- Chuk Yuen (disambiguation)
- Chun Kwan Temple
- Chung Hom Kok
- Chung Mei Road
- Chung Ying Street
- Chungking Mansion
- Chow, Stephen
- Chow, Vivian
- Chow Yun-fat
- Chung Sze Yuen
- Chungking Mansions
- Cinema of Hong Kong
- cinemas in Hong Kong, List of
- Citibank (Hong Kong)
- CITIC Ka Wah Bank
- cities and towns in Hong Kong, List of
- Citizens Party (Hong Kong)
- City Forum
- City One
- City University of Hong Kong (CityU)
- c!ty'super
- Civic Act-up
- Civil Aid Service (CAS)
- Civil Force
- Civil Service, Hong Kong
- Clementi, Cecil
- Clementi Secondary School
- Clear Water Bay
- Clear Water Bay Road
- Clear Water Bay Peninsula
- Climate of Hong Kong
- Clock Tower, Hong Kong
- Closed Area
- Closer Economic Partnership Arrangement
- CNEC Lui Ming Choi Primary School
- Cochrane Street
- Cocktail bun
- Co-co! Magazine
- Coco Lee
- Coins of the Hong Kong dollar
- Colonial Hong Kong
- Comics Festival, Hong Kong
- Commercial Radio Hong Kong
- Commercial Television
- Communications in Hong Kong
- companies in Hong Kong, List of
- Companies listed on the Hong Kong Stock Exchange
- Common electrical adaptors in Hong Kong and the United Kingdom
- Community Chest of Hong Kong, The
- Conduit Road
- Confederation of Trade Unions, Hong Kong (HKCTU)
- Connaught Place
- Connaught Road
- Connaught Road Central
- Connaught Road West
- Container Port Road
- Container Terminal 9
- Convention and Exhibition Centre, Hong Kong
- Correctional Services, Hong Kong
- Correctional Services Museum, Hong Kong
- Convention for the Extension of Hong Kong Territory (Second Convention of Peking)
- Convention of Chuenpi
- Convention of Peking
- Copyright law of Hong Kong
- Cosmopolitan Dock
- Cotton Tree Drive
- Country parks and conservation in Hong Kong
- Court of Final Appeal
- Cox's Road
- Cram schools in Hong Kong
- Crapnell's camellia
- CRC Oil Storage Depot
- Cross-Harbour Tunnel
- Crow's Nest
- Cuisine of Hong Kong
- Culture Centre, Hong Kong
- Culture of Hong Kong
- Cyberport

== D ==
- D'Aguilar Street
- D'Aguilar, George Charles
- Dah Sing Bank Limited
- Dai Pai Dong
- Dai pai dong
- Dairy Farm
- David, Edgeworth Beresford
- Davis, John Francis
- Davis Street
- DBS Bank
- DBS Bank (Hong Kong)
- Declared monuments of Hong Kong
- December 2005 protest for democracy in Hong Kong
- Deep Bay
- Deep Water Bay
- Delia Group of Schools
- Delia (Man Kiu) English Primary School
- Democratic Alliance for the Betterment and Progress of Hong Kong (DAB)
- Democratic Party
- Democracy in Hong Kong
- Demographics of Hong Kong
- Des Voeux Road
- Des Vœux, William
- Devil's Peak
- Diamond Hill
- Dim sum
- Diocesan Boys' School
- Direct Subsidy Scheme (DSS)
- Discovery Bay
- District councils of Hong Kong
- Hong Kong District Council election
- Districts of Hong Kong
- Hong Kong Disneyland Resort
- Disneyland Resort line (MTR)
- Disneyland Resort station
- Hong Kong Disneyland
- Hong Kong Disneyland Hotel
- Disney's Hollywood Hotel
- Dit da
- Hong Kong dollar
- Christopher Doyle
- Dragon boat
- Dragon boat race
- Drunken Master
- Duddell Street
- Dundas Street, Hong Kong
- Duplicate Tsing Yi South Bridge
- Lydia Dunn, Baroness Dunn

== E ==
- Eagle's Nest
- Easeful Court
- East Lamma Channel
- East Point, Hong Kong
- East Rail line
- East Week
- Eastern District, Hong Kong
- Eastern Express
- Eastern Harbour Crossing
- East Tsim Sha Tsui station
- Easy Finder
- Environment of Hong Kong
- Hong Kong Economic and Trade Office
- Hong Kong Economic Journal
- Hong Kong Economic Times
- Economy of Hong Kong
- EcoPark, Hong Kong
- Edinburgh Place
- Education and Manpower Bureau
- Secretary for Education and Manpower
- Education in Hong Kong
- The Hong Kong Institute of Education (HKIEd)
- Educational Television
- Egg tart
- Election (2005 film)
- Elections in Hong Kong
- Electronic Payment Services
- Common electrical adaptors in Hong Kong and the United Kingdom
- Electric Road
- Elgin Street, Hong Kong
- Elliot, Charles
- Emblem of Hong Kong
- Emperor Group
- Employment in Hong Kong
- English language
- English Schools Foundation
- Enter the Dragon
- Enter the Dragon (soundtrack)
- Entertainment Expo Hong Kong
- Environmental Protection Department
- Epoch Times, The
- Everlasting Regret
- Exchange Square
- Executive Council of Hong Kong

== F ==
- Fa Yuen Street
- Fan Kam Road
- Fan Lau
- Fan Lau Fort
- Fanling
- Fanling Environmental Resource Centre
- Fanling Lodge
- Fanling–Sheung Shui New Town
- Fanling station
- Fanling Wai
- Fan Sin Temple
- Father Cucchiara Memorial School
- Federation of Students, Hong Kong (HKFS)
- Federation of Trade Unions, Hong Kong (HKFTU)
- Feel 100%
- Festival Walk
- Foods of Mankind Museum
- Ford, David Robert
- harbour crossing of Hong Kong, Fourth
- Film Awards, Hong Kong
- Filipinos in Hong Kong
- Film Archive, Hong Kong
- Financial Secretary (Hong Kong)
- Fire Services Department
- First Opium War
- First Pacific Bank
- Fish ball
- Fisheries in Hong Kong
- Fisherman's Wharf, Hong Kong
- Flag of Hong Kong
- Flagstaff House
- Flat Island
- Fleming Road
- Fleming, Francis
- Fo Pang
- Fo Tan
- Fok Tak Temple
- Football Association, Hong Kong
- football team, Hong Kong national
- Forbes family
- Foreign Correspondents' Club, Hong Kong
- Foreign domestic helpers in Hong Kong
- Foreign relations of Hong Kong
- Former Central Magistracy
- Former French Mission Building
- Former Kowloon British School
- Former Marine Police Headquarters Compound
- Former Supreme Court Building
- Four Asian Tigers
- Forsgate, Hugh Moss Gerald
- Fortis Bank Asia HK
- Freddy (weather)
- Free television services, Hong Kong
- Fruit Market
- Fubon Bank (Hong Kong)
- Fuk Wa Street
- Functional constituency
- Frederick Fung
- Fung Shue Wo
- Fung Shue Wo Road
- Fung Ying Seen Koon
- Fut Gar

== G ==
- Gage Street
- Gammon Construction
- List of gaps in Hong Kong
- Garden Road, Hong Kong
- Garley Building
- Gascoigne Road
- Gass, Michael David Irving
- Gate Lodge
- Gateway, The
- Generale Belgian Bank
- Geography of Hong Kong
- Gilwell Campsite
- Gimson, Franklin Charles
- Gin Drinkers Bay
- Gin Drinkers Line
- Glenealy
- Global China Group Holdings Limited
- Glory to Hong Kong
- Gloucester Road, Hong Kong
- The Gods Must Be Crazy IV – V
- The Gods Must Be Crazy III
- Gold Bauhinia Star
- Golden Bauhinia Square
- Golden Computer Arcade
- Golden Harvest
- Goods and Services Tax
- Government Chinese Character Set
- Government Dockyard
- Government Flying Service
- Government Hill
- Government House, Hong Kong
- Government of Hong Kong
- Government departments and agencies in Hong Kong
- Governor of Hong Kong
- Graham Street
- Grand Bauhinia Medal
- Grantham, Alexander
- Grantham's camellia
- Greater China
- Green Island, Hong Kong
- Greenfield Garden
- Grenville House
- Group Sense PDA
- Growth Enterprise Market
- Gun Club Hill Barracks
- Gutzlaff Street
- Gweilo

== H ==
- .hk
- Ha Tsuen
- HAECO
- Haddon-Cave, Charles Philip
- Haiphong Road
- Hakka cuisine
- Hakka language
- Hakka stuffed tofu
- Halward, Nelson Victor
- Handover (history)
- Handover of Hong Kong
- Handover ceremony of Hong Kong in 1997, The
- Hang Seng Bank
- Hang Seng Index
- Hang Seng Composite Index Series
- Hang Seng Composite Industry Indexes
- Hankow Road
- Happy Together (film)
- Happy Valley, Hong Kong
- Happy Valley Racecourse
- Harbour City
- harbours in Hong Kong, List of
- Harcourt Road
- Harcourt, Cecil Halliday Jepson
- Hau Kok Tin Hau Temple
- Hau Tsz Kok Pai
- Hau Wong (Holy Marquis)
- Headline Daily
- Health Education Exhibition and Resources Centre
- Health, Welfare and Food Bureau
- Health, Welfare and Food, Secretary for
- Hei Ling Chau
- heliports in Hong Kong
- Heng Fa Chuen
- Hennessy Road
- Hennessy, John Pope
- Heung Yee Kuk
- Highcliff
- High Court Building (Hong Kong)
- High Island
- High Street
- High West
- Higher education in Hong Kong
- Higher Level Examination, Hong Kong (HKHLE)
- Hillwood Road
- Hip Tin temples in Hong Kong
- Hiram's Highway
- History of transport in Hong Kong
- History of Hong Kong
- Hitman: Codename 47
- HKR International Limited
- HMS Minden
- HMS Tamar (1863)
- HMS Vengeance (R71)
- Ho, Cyd
- Ho Fung College
- Ho Lap College
- Ho Man Tin
- Ho, Stanley
- Hoi Ha Wan
- Haiphong Road
- Hoi Sham Island
- Hok Yuen
- Hollywood Road
- Home Ownership Scheme
- Home Return Permit
- Hong (Chinese surname)
- Hongkong and Shanghai Banking Corporation
- Hongkongers
- Hong Kong 1 July marches
- Hong Kong Academy for Performing Arts
- Hong Kong action cinema
- Hong Kong after transfer of sovereignty
- Hong Kong Amateur Hockey Club
- Hong Kong Association of Banks
- Hong Kong and Kowloon Trades Union Council
- Hong Kong at the 2000 Summer Olympics
- Hong Kong at the 2004 Summer Olympics
- Hong Kong at the 2008 Summer Olympics
- Hong Kong at the 2024 Summer Olympics
- Hong Kong Buddhist Cemetery
- Hong Kong Buddhist Hospital
- Hong Kong camellia
- Hong Kong cascade frog
- Hong Kong China Ferry Terminal
- Hong Kong City Hall
- Hong Kong Club Building
- Hong Kong Coliseum
- Hong Kong Commercial Daily
- Hong Kong croton
- Hong Kong Cultural Centre
- Hong Kong Disneyland
- Hong Kong dollar
- Hong Kong drifter
- Hong Kong Economic Journal
- Hong Kong Economic Times
- Hong Kong eating culture
- Hong Kong English
- Hong Kong Federation of Students
- Hong Kong Flu
- Hong Kong General Chamber of Commerce
- Hong Kong Girl Guides Association
- Hong Kong Government Lunar New Year kau chim tradition
- Hong Kong Heritage Discovery Centre
- Hong Kong Heritage Museum
- Hong Kong High End Audio Visual Show
- Hong Kong honours system
- Hong Kong Housing Authority Exhibition Centre
- Hong Kong Human Rights and Democracy Act
- The Hong Kong Institute of Education (HKIEd)
- Hong Kong Institute of Languages
- Hong Kong Institute of Vocational Education (Tsing Yi)
- Hong Kong International Film Festival
- Hong Kong International Airport
- Hong Kong International School
- Hong Kong Island
- Hong Kong Kids phenomenon
- Hongkong Land
- Hong Kong landmarks and tourist attractions
- Hong Kong Link
- Hong Kong-Macau Ferry Pier
- Hong Kong–Mainland China conflict
- Hong Kong Ministerial Conference of the World Trade Organization
- Hong Kong Museum of History
- Hong Kong Nang Yan College of Higher Education
- Hong Kong national football team
- Hong Kong newt
- Hong Kong Note Printing Limited
- Hong Kong Observatory
- Hong Kong Park
- Hong Kong People's Alliance on WTO
- Hong Kong Planning and Infrastructure Exhibition Gallery
- The Hong Kong Polytechnic University (PolyU)
- Hong Kong Professional Teachers' Union (HKPTU)
- Hongkong Post
- Hong Kong Progressive Alliance
- Hong Kong Property Services (Agency)
- Hong Kong protests
- Hong Kong returnee
- Hong Kong Secondary Students Union
- Hong Kong Sevens
- Hong Kong Shue Yan College
- Hong Kong Stadium
- Hong Kong Student Welfare Association
- Hong Kong studies
- Hong Kong Studies (journal)
- Hong Kong-style western cuisine
- Hong Kong Taoist Association
- Hong Kong Taoist Association Tang Hin Memorial Secondary School
- Hong Kong Taoist Association The Yuen Yuen Institute No.2 Secondary School
- Hong Kong Trail
- Hong Kong University of Science and Technology, The (HKUST)
- Hong Kong United Dockyard
- Hong Kong Way
- Hong Kong-Zhuhai-Macau Bridge
- Hongkong International Terminals Ltd.
- Hong Nin Savings Bank
- Hopewell Centre, Hong Kong
- Hopewell Holdings Ltd
- Hopewell Highway Infrastructure Ltd
- Hospital Authority
- hospitals in Hong Kong, List of
- HSBC
- HSBC Building (Hong Kong)
- Hu, Henry Hung-lick
- Hui, Michael
- Hui, Rafael
- Hui, Ricky
- Hui, Samuel
- Hui, Chiu-yin John
- Hui, Chung-shing Herman
- Hung Fut
- Hung Hing Road
- Hung Hom
- Hung Hom Bay
- Hung Ga Kuen
- Hung, Sammo
- Hung Shing Temple
- Hung Shing Temple, Tai Kok Tsui
- Hung Shing Temple, Wan Chai
- Hutchison Whampoa

== I ==
- I-Cable Communications
- I Shing Temple
- Ice House Street
- ILE romanization of Cantonese
- Immaculate Conception Cathedral of Hong Kong
- Imperial China, Hong Kong during
- In the Mood for Love
- Independent Commission Against Corruption
- Individual Visit Scheme
- Indo-Pacific humpback dolphin
- Industrial and Commercial Bank of China (Asia) (ICBC (Asia))
- Infernal Affairs
- Initial D
- Inland Revenue Department (Hong Kong)
- Inspiration Lake Recreation Centre
- International Finance Centre (Hong Kong)
- International Commerce Center
- List of international schools in Hong Kong
- Regina Ip
- Island House
- Island line (MTR)
- Island School
- Islands District
- Islands of Hong Kong
- Isogai, Rensuke

== J ==
- Jao Tsung-I
- Japanese military currency (1937–1945)
- Japanese occupation of Hong Kong (Three years and eight months)
- Jardine Aviation Services
- Jardine House
- Jardines (company)
- Jardine Strategic Holdings
- William Jardine
- Jardine's Bazaar
- Jau Gwai
- Java Road
- JETCO
- Jiaobei
- Jimmy Lai
- Hong Kong Jockey Club
- John Walden
- Johnston, Reginald
- Johnston Road
- Joint Organization of Unions - Hong Kong
- Joint Street
- Joint University Programmes Admissions System (JUPAS)
- Jordan (Area)
- Jordan Road
- Jordan station
- Joss house
- Joss House Bay
- Hong Kong Journalists Association
- Judiciary of Hong Kong
- Justice For All
- Justice, Secretary for
- Justice Union
- Jubilee Street
- Junk Keying
- Jumbo Kingdom
- Jyutping

== K ==
- K. L. Dhammajoti
- Kadoorie Farm and Botanic Garden
- Kadoorie, Michael
- Kaifong associations
- Kai Tak Airport
- Kai Tak Tunnel
- Kai-to
- Kam Chuk Kok
- Kam Shan Country Park
- Kam Sheung Road station
- Kam Tin
- Kam Tin Road
- Kao Se Tseien, Nicholas
- Kap Shui Mun
- Kap Shui Mun Bridge
- Kat O
- Kau chim
- Kau Kee Restaurant
- Kau Pui Lung
- Kau Sai Chau
- Kau Wa Keng
- Kau Yi Chau
- Kei Ling Ha
- Kei Ling Ha Lo Wai
- Kellett Bay
- Kellett Island
- Kennedy, Arthur Edward
- Kennedy Road
- Kennedy Town
- Keswick family, The
- Khalsa Diwan Sikh Temple
- The Killer
- Kimberley Street
- King George V School
- King's College
- King's Road
- Kissel, Nancy
- Kitchee SC
- Knutsford Terrace
- Koo, Joseph
- Kornhill
- Kowloon
- Kowloon Bay
- Kowloon–Canton Railway
- Kowloon-Canton Railway Corporation
- Kowloon City
- Kowloon railway station (KCR)
- Kowloon Masjid and Islamic Centre
- Kowloon station (MTR)
- Kowloon Park
- Kowloon Peak
- Kowloon Peninsula
- Kowloon Rock
- Kowloon Tong
- Kowloon Walled City
- Kumquat
- Kung Kao Po
- Kwai Chung
- Kwai Chung Incineration Plant
- Kwai Chung Hospital
- Kwai Chung Road
- Kwai Fong
- Kwai Fong station
- Kwai Tsing Container Terminals
- Kwai Tsing District
- Kwan Kung (Martial Deity)
- Kwan Kung Pavilion
- Kwan Tai temples in Hong Kong
- Kwan Tak-hing
- Kwan, Stanley
- Kwok, Aaron
- Kwok, Kenix
- Kwong Wah Hospital
- Kwun Chung
- Kwun Tong
- Kwun Tong Bypass
- Kwun Tong District
- Kwun Tong Road
- Kwun Yam (Bodhisattva of Compassion)
- Kwun Yam Shrine

== L ==
- Ladder Street
- Ladder streets
- Lai Chack Middle School
- Lai, Jimmy
- Lai Chi Kok
- Lai Chi Kok Amusement Park
- Lai Chi Kok Bay
- Lai Chi Kok Road
- Lai Chi Kok station
- Lai King station
- Lai Man Wai
- Lakes of Hong Kong
- Lam Chau
- Lam Sai-wing
- Lam Tin
- Lam Tsuen wishing trees
- Lam, Ringo
- Lamma Island
- Lan Kwai Fong
- Landmark, The
- Landmarks and tourist attractions, Hong Kong
- Langham Place
- Language Proficiency Assessment for Teachers (LPAT)
- Languages of Hong Kong
- Lantau Channel
- Lantau Island
- Lantau Link
- Lantau Link Visitors Centre
- Lantau Peak
- Lantau Trail
- Lau Kar-leung
- Lau Kar-wing
- Lau, Andrew
- Lau, Ambrose
- Lau, Emily
- Law of Hong Kong
- Law Uk Folk Museum
- Lawrence, Akandu
- Lazy Mutha Fucka (LMF)
- Le Meridien Cyberport Hotel
- Lee, Ambrose
- Lee, Bruce
- Lee, Coco
- Lee, Hacken
- Lee, Hysan
- Lee, Martin
- Lee Garden
- Lee Wing Tat
- Lee Tung Street
- Legislative Council of Hong Kong
- Legislative Council Complex
- Legislative election, Hong Kong
- Lei Cheng Uk
- Lei Cheng Uk Han Tomb Museum
- Lei Muk Shue
- Lei Yue Mun
- Lei Yue Mun Bay
- Lei Yue Mun Fort
- Lei Yue Mun Road
- Leighton Road
- Leisure and Cultural Services Department
- Lek Yuen
- Lennon Wall (Hong Kong)
- Leung, Antony
- Leung Chun Ying
- Leung, Elsie
- Leung, Gigi
- Leung Long Chau
- Leung So Kee
- Leung Chiu Wai, Tony
- Leung Ka Fai, Tony
- Li, Arthur
- Li, Richard
- Li, Victor
- Li Po Chun United World College of Hong Kong
- Liberal Party
- Liberate Hong Kong, the revolution of our times
- Libraries in Hong Kong, List of
- Light pollution in Hong Kong
- Light Rail (MTR)
- Lights Out Hong Kong
- Lin Fa Temple
- Ling, Andrew
- Lingnan University
- Ling Wan Ting
- Ling To Monastery
- Lin, Paul
- Link REIT
- Linked exchange rate system in Hong Kong
- Lion Rock
- Lion Rock Country Park
- Lion Rock Spirit
- Lion Rock Tunnel
- Lion Rock Tunnel (Tuen Ma line)
- Lions Nature Education Centre
- Lippo Centre
- Little Fighter Online
- Liu To
- Liu To Bridge
- Lo Pan Temple
- Lo Wu
- Lobo, Rogerio Hyndman
- Lockhart, James Stewart
- Lockhart Road
- Lok Ma Chau
- Lok Sin Tong Leung Chik Wai Memorial School
- Long Win Bus
- Long Valley, Hong Kong
- Lower Albert Road
- Lugard, Frederick
- Luen Wo Hui
- John C.S. Lui
- Lung Cheung Road
- Lung Fu Shan Country Park
- Lung Kwu Chau

== M ==
- Ma Lik
- Ma Liu Shui
- Ma On Shan
- Ma On Shan (peak)
- Ma On Shan Country Park
- Ma On Shan line
- Ma Shi Chau
- Ma Tau Wai
- Ma Wan
- Ma Wan Channel
- MacDonnell Road
- MacDonnell, Richard Graves
- MacDougall, David Mercer
- MacLehose, Crawford Murray
- MacLehose Trail
- Madame Tussauds Hong Kong
- Magazine Gap Road
- Mahjong scoring rules, Hong Kong
- Mahjong culture
- Mai Po
- Mai Po Marshes
- Mainland China
- Mak, Alice
- Man Kam To
- Man Luen Choon
- Mandarin Airlines Flight 642
- Mandarin Oriental
- Mandatory provident fund (MPF)
- Ma Wan Channel
- Man Mo Temple
- Man Wa Lane
- Marsh, William Henry
- Maritime Square
- Maritime Museum, Hong Kong
- Martial arts film
- Matheson James
- May, Francis Henry
- Mayfair Gardens
- McDull
- McHardy, Alexander Anderson
- McMug
- Medal of Honour
- Medal for Bravery (Bronze)
- Medal for Bravery (Gold)
- Medal for Bravery (Silver)
- Media in Hong Kong
- Metropolis Daily
- Hong Kong Museum of Medical Sciences
- Mei Foo Sun Chuen
- Mercer, William Thomas
- MEVAS Bank
- Mid-Levels
- Middle Road
- milk tea, Hong Kong-style
- Military of Hong Kong
- Military Service Corps, Hong Kong
- Minden, HMS
- Minden Row
- Mithaiwala, Dorabjee Naorojee
- Ming Pao
- Mint, Hong Kong
- Mirs Bay
- Miss Hong Kong Pageant
- Mister Softee
- Miu Fat Buddhist Monastery
- Mo lei tau
- Modern Terminals
- Mody Road
- Money Times
- Monetary Authority, Hong Kong
- Mong Kok
- Mong Kok District
- Mong Kok Tsui
- Morrison Hill Road
- Morse, Arthur
- Morrison, John Robert
- Mother's Choice (Hong Kong)
- Motorola DragonBall
- Mount Nicholson
- Mount Parker
- Mountain Lodge
- mountains, peaks and hills in Hong Kong, List of
- movies set in Hong Kong, List of
- Moy Lin-shin
- MTR
- MTR Corporation
- MTR Properties
- List of MTR stations
- Mui, Anita
- Mui Wo
- Mun Tsai Tong
- Murray Barracks
- Murray House
- Museums in Hong Kong
- Hong Kong Museum of Art
- Hong Kong Museum of Coastal Defence
- Hong Kong Museum of History
- Hong Kong Museum of Medical Sciences
- Music of Hong Kong
- My Life as McDull
- My Lucky Stars

== N ==
- Nai Chung
- Nam Fung Chau
- Nam Fung Sun Chuen
- Nam Wan
- Nam Wan Tunnel
- Nan Lian Garden
- Nanyang Commercial Bank
- Nathan, Matthew
- Nathan Road
- National Commercial Bank (China)
- National Industrial Bank of China
- Nepalese people in Hong Kong
- New Century Forum
- New Evening Post
- New Kowloon
- New Territories
- New Territories East (1998 constituency)
- New Territories North (2021 constituency)
- New Territories North East (2021 constituency)
- New Territories North West (2021 constituency)
- New Territories South East (2021 constituency)
- New Territories South West (2021 constituency)
- New Territories West (1998 constituency)
- New World Centre
- New World First Bus
- New World Development
- New World First Ferry
- New Youth Forum
- newspapers of Hong Kong, List of
- Next Magazine (Hong Kong and Taiwan)
- Next Digital
- Nga Ying Chau
- Ngau Chi Wan
- Ngau Tau Kok
- Nicoll, John Fearns
- Niimi, Masaichi
- Ninepin Group
- Noon-day Gun
- Norman-Walker, Hugh Selby
- North District, Hong Kong
- North Point
- Northcote, Geoffry Alexander Stafford
- Now Business News Channel
- Now TV (Hong Kong)
- NOW.com

== O ==
- O'Brien, George Thomas Michael
- Observatory, Hong Kong
- Observatory Hill
- Observatory Road
- Ocean Park Hong Kong
- Ocean Terminal, Hong Kong
- Octopus card
- Ohel Leah Synagogue
- Oktoberfest
- Oi Kwan Road
- Oi! arts center
- Old Bailey Street
- Old Industrial Buildings Revitalization in Hong Kong
- Old Master Q
- Old Supreme Court Building, Hong Kong
- Old Wan Chai Post Office
- One-Armed Swordsman
- One country, two systems
- One Island East
- The Open University of Hong Kong
- Opium Wars
- Opium War, First
- Opium War, Second
- order of precedence, Hong Kong
- Organisations with former royal patronage in Hong Kong
- Oriental Daily News
- Oriental Heroes
- Origins of names of cities and towns in Hong Kong
- Outlying Islands, Hong Kong
- Outward Processing Arrangement (OPA)
- Over the Rainbow (organization)

== P ==
- Pacific Place
- Pak Tam Chung
- Pak Tsz Lane Park
- Pang uk
- Pao, Eugene
- Papier-mâché offering shops in Hong Kong
- Paradise Mall
- Park Island Transport
- Parsi
- Pat Sin Leng
- parks and gardens of Hong Kong
- Parker, Mount
- ParknShop
- Lord Patten of Barnes
- Pay television services, Hong Kong
- Pau Shiu-hung
- PCCW
- Peak Tram
- Peaked Hill
- Pearl River
- Pearl River Delta
- Pedder Street
- Peel, William
- Peel Street
- Pei Ho Street
- Peking Opera School
- Peking Road
- I. M. Pei
- Penfold Park
- Performing Artistes Guild, Hong Kong
- Peng Chau
- Peninsula Hong Kong, The
- Peninsula Hotels, The
- Penny's Bay
- People's Liberation Army Hong Kong Garrison
- Percival Street
- Perhaps Love
- Personal Emergency Link
- Philharmonic Orchestra, Hong Kong
- Phoenix Television
- Pillar Island
- Pineapple bun
- Ping Chau
- Ping Shan
- Piper's Hill
- Place names of Hong Kong
- Places of worship in Hong Kong
- planning areas in Hong Kong, List of
- Plaza Hollywood
- Plover Cove
- Plover Cove Reservoir
- List of Hong Kong poets
- Po Lam Road
- Po Lin Monastery
- Po Leung Kuk
- Po Leung Kuk Lo Kit Sing (1983) College
- Po Leung Kuk Chan Yat Primary School
- Po Leung Kuk Museum
- Po Leung Kuk Tsing Yi Secondary School (Skill Opportunity)
- Po Sang Bank
- Po Toi
- Po Toi Islands
- Pok Fu Lam
- Pok Fu Lam Road
- Pokfield Road
- Police Force, Hong Kong
- Police Museum
- Police Tactical Unit (PTU)
- Politics of Hong Kong
- political parties in Hong Kong, List of
- The Hong Kong Polytechnic University (PolyU)
- Poon choi
- Port and Airport Development Strategy
- Port of Hong Kong
- Portland Street
- Possession Point
- Possession Street
- Postage stamps and postal history of Hong Kong
- Henry Pottinger
- Pottinger Street
- Pre-history of Hong Kong
- Prince Edward, Hong Kong
- Prince Edward Road
- Prince of Wales Building
- Prince of Wales Hospital
- Prince's Building
- Princess Margaret Hospital
- Princess Margaret Road
- Principal Officials Accountability System (POAS)
- prisons in Hong Kong, List of
- Pro-democracy camp (Hong Kong)
- Proper Cantonese pronunciation
- protected species in Hong Kong, List of
- Provisional Legislative Council
- PTU (film)
- Public Bank
- Public holidays in Hong Kong
- Public Library, Hong Kong
- Public Square Street
- Pui O
- Punti
- Punti–Hakka Clan Wars
- Pyramid Rock

== Q ==
- Quah Chow Cheung
- Quarry Bay
- Queen Elizabeth, RMS
- Queen Elizabeth Hospital
- Queen Mary Hospital
- Queen Victoria Street, Hong Kong
- Queen's College, Hong Kong
- Queen's Pier
- Queen's Road, Hong Kong
- Queensway, Hong Kong

== R ==
- Radio Television Hong Kong (RTHK)
- Rail gauges and power supply of Hong Kong rails
- Railway Museum, Hong Kong
- Rail transport in Hong Kong
- Rambler Channel
- Rambler Channel Bridge (railway bridge)
- Rambler Crest
- RAF Kai Tak
- RAF Sek Kong
- Reactions to the 2014 Hong Kong protests
- Reactions to the 2019–2020 Hong Kong protests
- Reclaim Sheung Shui Station
- Reclamation Street
- Red Cross, Hong Kong
- Red House
- Regional Council
- Regional Services Department
- Reis, Michelle
- Reform Club of Hong Kong
- Regional Council
- Repulse Bay
- Reservoirs in Hong Kong
- Rice congee
- Right of abode in Hong Kong
- Rivers of Hong Kong
- Rivers, Gregory Charles
- Road to Hong Kong, The
- RMS Queen Elizabeth
- Roberts, Denys
- Robinson, Hercules
- Robinson, William
- Robinson Road, Hong Kong
- Romer's tree frog
- Rooftop slum
- Rosary Church
- Rosaryhill School
- Route 1
- Route 2
- Route 3
- Route 4
- Route 5
- Route 7
- Route 8
- Route 9
- Route Twisk
- Royal Hong Kong Yacht Club
- Royal Hong Kong Auxiliary Air Force
- Royal Hong Kong Regiment
- Rumsey Rock
- Rumsey Street
- RWB 330

== S ==
- Sakai, Takashi
- Sai chaan
- Sai Kung Town
- Sai Kung District
- Sai Kung Peninsula
- Sai Shan
- Sai Sha Road
- Sai Shan Road
- Sai Shan Village
- Sai Tso Wan, Tsing Yi
- Sai Wan
- Sai Yeung Choi Street
- Sai Ying Pun
- Sai Ying Pun Community Complex
- St. Andrew's Church
- St. John's Cathedral
- St. Joseph's College
- St. Mary's Canossian College
- St. Paul's Co-educational College
- St. Paul's College
- St. Paul's Convent School
- St. Paul's Secondary School
- Sales, Arnaldo de Oliveira
- Salisbury Road
- Sam Pui Chau
- Sam Tai Tsz Temple and Pak Tai Temple
- Sam Tung Uk Museum
- Sampan
- San Po Kong
- San Tin
- Sandbars in Hong Kong
- Sandy Bay
- Sandy Ridge
- Sassoon Road
- Sau Choi Mansion
- Science Museum, Hong Kong
- Science Park, Hong Kong
- Science and Technology, The Hong Kong University of (HKUST)
- schools in Hong Kong, List of
- Scout Association of Hong Kong, The
- Seamen's Institute
- Seamen's strike of 1922
- Second Opium War
- Serene Garden
- Seven Swords
- Severe acute respiratory syndrome (SARS)
- Severn, Claud
- SARS coronavirus
- SARS outbreak, Progress of the
- Sha Chau
- Sha Lo Wan
- Sha On Street
- Sha Tau Kok
- Sha Tau Kok Railway
- Sha Tau Kok Road
- Sha Tin
- Sha Tin District
- Sha Tin New Town
- Sha Tin Pass
- Sha Tin Park
- Sha Tin Town Hall
- Sham Chun River
- Sham Shui Po
- Sham Shui Po District
- Sham Shui Po Park
- Sham Shui Po Police Station
- Sham Tseng
- Shanghai Commercial Bank
- Shanghai Street
- Shangri-La Hotels and Resorts
- Shantung Street
- Shaolin Soccer
- Shap Pat Heung
- Sharp Peak
- Shau Kei Wan Road
- Shaw Brothers Studio
- Shaw Prize
- Run Run Shaw
- Shek Kong
- Shek Kong Airfield
- Shek O
- Shek Pai Wan
- Shek Shan
- Shek Tong Tsui
- Shek Wan
- Sheng Kung Hui
- Sheng Kung Hui Ho Chak Wan Primary School
- Sheng Kung Hui Tsing Yi Chu Yan Primary School
- Sheng Kung Hui Tsing Yi Estate Ho Chak Wan Primary School
- Sheung Shui
- Sheung Wan
- Sheung Yiu Folk Museum
- Shing Mun Country Park
- Shing Mun River
- Shing Wong
- Shing Tai Road
- Shing Wong Street
- Ship Street
- Shouson Hill
- Shui Cham Tsui Pai
- Shun Lee
- Sik Kok Kwong
- Silver Bauhinia Star
- Silvercord
- Sin Hua Bank
- Sing Pao Daily News
- Sing Tao Daily
- Sino-British Joint Declaration
- Sino-British Joint Liaison Group
- Site of Special Scientific Interest
- Siu A Chau
- Siu Sai Wan
- Siu Sai Wan Road
- Six States Installation of Minister murder
- Sixth form college
- S. L. Wong Cantonese romanisation
- S. L. Wong Cantonese transcription
- Smith, Norman Lockhart
- Smithfield
- Sok Kwu Wan
- So Kwun Wat
- So Man-fung
- So Uk
- So Uk Estate
- Soho, Hong Kong
- Soko Islands
- Sorrento
- South Asians in Hong Kong
- South China Athletic Association
- South China Morning Post
- South China Sea
- South Island School
- South Lantau Road
- Southern District
- Southorn, Wilfrid Thomas
- Soy Street
- Space Museum, Hong Kong
- Special Administrative Region
- Species first discovered in Hong Kong
- The Standard (Hong Kong)
- Standard Chartered Bank
- Standing Committee on Pressure Groups (SCOPG)
- Stanley, Hong Kong
- Stanley Street
- Star Ferry
- Star House
- STAR TV
- Statue Square
- Staunton Street
- Staveley, Charles William Dunbar
- Staveley Street
- Staveley, William
- Stewart, Frederick
- Stinky tofu
- Stock Exchange, Hong Kong
- Stone Circles
- Stone wall trees in Hong Kong
- Stonecutters Bridge
- Stonecutters Island
- streets and roads in Hong Kong, List of
- Stubbs, Reginald Edward
- Stubbs Road
- Sub-replacement fertility
- Subterranean rivers in Hong Kong
- Sudden Weekly
- Sulphur Channel
- The Sun
- Sunset Peak
- Sun Yat-sen
- Sun Yat-sen Museum, Dr.
- Sunday Examiner
- Sun Yee On
- Sung Wong Toi
- Sunshine Island
- Sunny Bay
- Swire
- Swiss wing
- The Swordsman (1990 film)
- Szeto Wah

== T ==
- Ta Kung Pao
- Ta Kwu Ling
- Taai Ping Ching Jiu
- Table sharing
- Tactics and methods surrounding the 2019–20 Hong Kong protests
- Tai A Chau
- Tai Fu Tai Mansion
- Tai Kok Tsui
- Tai Koo
- Tai Lam Country Park
- Tai Mo Shan
- Tai Nam Wan
- Tai O
- Tai O Road
- Tai-Pan
- Tai Ping Shan Street
- Tai Po
- Tai Po District
- Tai Po Kau
- Tai Po Kau Station
- Tai Po New Town
- Tai Po Road
- Taishan language
- Tai Tam
- Tai Tam Harbour
- Tai Tam Reservoirs
- Tai Tam Road
- Tai Wai
- Tai Wan, Hung Hom
- Tai Wan Road
- Tai Wong Temple, Yuen Long Kau Hui
- Taikoo Dockyard
- Taikoo Place
- Taikoo Shing
- List of tallest buildings in Hong Kong
- Tam Kon Shan
- Tam Kon Shan Interchange
- Tam Kon Shan Road
- Tam Kung (Deity)
- Tam, Patrick
  - Tam, Patrick (film director)
  - Tam, Patrick (actor)
- Tam, Roman
- HMS Tamar (1863)
- HMS Tamar (shore station)
- Tamar site
- Tan Shan River
- Tanaka, Hisaichi
- Tanka (ethnic group)
- Tang, Henry
- Tanxu
- Tap Mun
- Tate's Cairn
- Tate's Cairn Highway
- Tathong Channel
- Taxicabs of Hong Kong
- tea culture, Hong Kong
- Teesdale, Edmund Brinsley
- Telecommunications industry in Hong Kong
- Telegraph Bay
- Television Broadcasts Limited (TVB)
- Tell me
- Temple Street
- Temporary housing area (THA)
- Ten Thousand Buddhas Monastery
- Teochew language
- Thais in Hong Kong
- The Center
- The Cross-Harbour (Holdings) Ltd
- The Landmark (Hong Kong)
- The Peninsula Hong Kong
- The World of Suzie Wong
- Thomson Road
- Three Fathoms Cove
- Tian'anmen Square protests of 1989
- Tian Tan Buddha
- Tide Cove
- Tien, James
- Tien, Michael
- Tierra Verde
- Tiger Balm Garden
- Time, Hong Kong
- Timeline of Hong Kong history
- Timeline of the 2019–20 Hong Kong protests (March–June 2019)
- Timeline of the 2019–20 Hong Kong protests (July 2019)
- Timeline of the 2019–20 Hong Kong protests (August 2019)
- Timeline of the 2019–20 Hong Kong protests (September 2019)
- Timeline of the 2019–20 Hong Kong protests (October 2019)
- Timeline of the 2019–20 Hong Kong protests (November 2019)
- Timeline of the 2019–20 Hong Kong protests (December 2019)
- Timeline of the 2019–20 Hong Kong protests (January 2020)
- Timeline of the 2019–20 Hong Kong protests (February 2020)
- Timeline of the 2019–20 Hong Kong protests (March 2020)
- Timeline of the 2019–20 Hong Kong protests (April 2020)
- Timeline of the 2019–20 Hong Kong protests (May 2020)
- Timeline of the 2019–20 Hong Kong protests (June 2020)
- Timeline of the 2019-20 Hong Kong protests (July 2020)
- Times Square
- Tin Hau (Goddess of Sea)
- Tin Hau (area)
- Tin Hau MTR Station
- Tin Hau temples in Hong Kong
- Tin Hau Temple, Causeway Bay
- Tin Hau Temple, Joss House Bay
- Tin Hau Temple Complex, Yau Ma Tei
- Tin Shui Wai
- Tin Tin Daily News
- Ting Kau Bridge
- Tiu Keng Leng
- Tivoli Garden
- To Kau Wan
- To Kit
- To Kwa Wan
- Tolo Channel
- Tolo Harbour
- TOM Group
- Tong Fuk
- Tong Shui Road
- Tonkin Street
- Tonnochy Road
- Tonnochy, Malcolm Struan
- Tourism in Hong Kong
- Towngas
- Trade mark law of Hong Kong
- Trains on the MTR
- Tramways, Hong Kong
- Training bus
- Transfer of sovereignty over Hong Kong
- Transport in Hong Kong
- Trappist Haven Monastery
- Treaty of Nanking
- Trench, David Clive Crosbie
- Tsang, Donald
- Tsang Yok Sing
- Tsat Tsz Mui
- Tsat Tsz Mui Road
- Tse, Nicholas
- Tseung Kwan O
- Tseung Kwan O MTR Station
- Tseung Kwan O Industrial Estate
- Tseung Kwan O Tunnel
- Tsim Sha Tsui
- Tsim Sha Tsui MTR Station
- Tsim Sha Tsui Ferry Pier
- Tsim Sha Tsui Fire Station
- Tsing Kwai Highway
- Tsing Lai Bridge
- Tsing Leng Tsui
- Tsing Long Highway
- Tsing Lung Tau
- Tsing Ma Bridge
- Tsing Ma Control Area
- Tsing Shan Monastery
- Tsing Yan Temporary Housing Area
- Tsing Yi
- Tsing Yi MTR Station
- Tsing Yi Bay
- Tsing Yi South Bridge
- Tsing Yi Estate
- Tsing Yi Fire Station
- Tsing Yi Fishermen's Children's Primary School
- Tsing Yi Heung Sze Wui Road
- Tsing Yi Interchange
- Tsing Yi Lutheran Village
- Tsing Yi Municipal Services Building
- Tsing Yi Nature Trail
- Tsing Yi North Bridge
- Tsing Yi North Coastal Road
- Tsing Yi Park
- Tsing Yi Peak
- Tsing Yi Pier
- Tsing Yi Police Station
- Tsing Yi Promenade
- Tsing Yi Public Library
- Tsing Yi Public School
- Tsing Yi Road
- Tsing Yi Road West
- Tsing Yi Rural Committee
- Tsing Yi South Fire Station
- Tsing Yi Sports Ground
- Tsing Yi Swimming Pool
- Tsing Yi Tong
- Tsing Yi Town
- Tsing Yi Town Centre
- Tsuen Wan
- Tsuen Wan District
- Tsuen Wan Environmental Resource Centre
- Tsuen Wan MTR Station
- Tsuen Wan New Town
- Tsui Hark
- Tsui Museum of Art
- Tsui Po Ko
- Tsz Shan Monastery
- Tsz Wan Shan
- Tu, Elsie
- Tuen Mun
- Tuen Mun District
- Tuen Mun New Town
- Tuen Mun Road
- Tuen Ng Festival
- Tung Chao Yung
- Tung Chee Hwa
- Tung Choi Street
- Tung Chung
- Tung Chung Battery
- Tung Chung Fort
- Tung Lin Kok Yuen
- Tung Lo Wan Road
- Tung Lung Chau
- Tung Lung Fort
- Tung Po Tor Monastery
- Tung Wah Coffin Home
- Tung Wah Charity Show
- Tung Wah Group of Hospitals
- Tung Wah Group of Hospitals Chow Yin Sum Primary School
- Tung Wah Group of Hospitals Museum
- Tung Wah Group of Hospitals S. C. Gaw Memorial College
- Tung Wah Group of Hospitals Wong See Sum Primary School
- Tung Ying Building
- TVB8
- TVB Jade
- TVB Pearl
- TVB News
- TVB programmes, List of
- Twins (band)
- Typhoon shelter

== U ==
- Uncles of Victoria Park
- Unequal Treaties
- Union Square Phase 7
- United Democrats of Hong Kong
- University Grants Committee (Hong Kong)
- universities in Hong Kong, List of
- University of Hong Kong, The (HKU)
- University Museum and Art Gallery
- Upper Albert Road
- Upper Lascar Row
- Upstairs Cafés in Hong Kong
- Urban Council
- Urban Council Centenary Garden
- urban public parks and gardens of Hong Kong, List of
- Urban Renewal Authority
- Urban Services Department
- Urmston Road

== V ==
- Victoria Barracks
- Victoria City
- Victoria Harbour
- Victoria Harbour crossings
- Victoria Park
- Victoria Peak
- Victoria Peak Garden
- Victoria Prison
- Victoria Road
- Vidal, Jill
- Villa Esplanada
- Violet Hill
- villages in Hong Kong, List of
- Visual Arts Centre, Hong Kong
- Vitasoy
- Vietnamese people in Hong Kong
- VTech
- ViuTV

== W ==
- Waglan Island
- Wah Fu
- Wah Fu Estate
- Wah Yan College, Hong Kong
- Wah Yan College, Kowloon
- Waitau
- Waldegrave, George Turner
- Walla-walla
- Walled villages of Hong Kong
- Wan Chai
- Wan Chai District
- Wan Chai Pak Tai Temple
- Wan Chai Pier
- Wang Tau Hom
- Waste management in Hong Kong
- Water supply and sanitation in Hong Kong
- Waterloo Road, Hong Kong
- Watson's
- Waves of mass migrations from Hong Kong
- Webb, David Michael
- Wellcome
- Wellington Barracks
- Wellington Street
- Wen Wei Po
- West Kowloon Cultural District
- West Kowloon Waterfront Promenade
- West Island School
- West Lamma Channel
- West Rail line
- West Rail Sightseeing Bus
- western cuisine, Hong Kong-style
- Western Harbour Crossing
- Western Market
- West Point
- Wetland Park, Hong Kong
- Whampoa Dock, Hong Kong and
- Whampoa Garden
- Wharf (Holdings), The
- Wharf Road
- Whatever Will Be, Will Be (1995 film)
- Whitfield, Henry Wase
- Whitfield Barracks
- Whitty Street
- Wilson, David, Baron Wilson of Tillyorn
- Wilson Trail
- Wind and Structural Health Monitoring System
- Wing Chun
- Wing Hang Bank
- Wing Hang Bank Limited
- Wing Kut Street
- Wing Lok Street
- Wing Lung Bank
- Wing On Street
- Wing On Bank
- Wing On House
- Wing Sing Street
- Wo Che
- Wok Tai Wan
- Wong, Anthony (Wong Chau Sang)
- Wong, Anthony (Wong Yiu Ming)
- Wong Chuk Hang
- Wong, Faye
- Wong Fei Hung
- Wong Kar Wai
- Wong Kwok Pun
- Wong Jim (James Wong)
- Wong, Joey
- Wong, Joseph
- Wong, Marti
- Wong Nai Chung
- Wong Nai Chung Gap
- Wong Nai Chung Road
- Wong Shek
- Wong Tai Sin (Deity)
- Wong Tai Sin, Hong Kong
- Wong Tai Sin District
- Wong Tai Sin Temple (Hong Kong)
- Wong Wan Chau
- Wong Yuk-man, Raymond
- Wong, Wyman
- The World of Suzie Wong
- World Trade Centre (Hong Kong)
- Written Cantonese
- WTO Ministerial Conference of 2005
- Wu, Gordon
- Wu Kai Sha
- Wun Yiu Village
- Wyndham Street

== X ==
- Xinhua News Agency
- XO sauce

== Y ==
- Yacht people
- Yam, Joseph
- Yam O
- Yang, Ti Liang
- Yaohan
- Yau Kom Tau (disambiguation)
- Yau Ma Tei
- Yaumati Ferry, Hongkong and
- Yaumati Theatre
- Yau, Shing-Tung
- Yau Tong
- Yau Tsim Mong District
- Yee Wo Street
- Yen Chow Street
- Yen, Donnie
- Yeung, Miriam
- Yeung Sum
- Ying Wa College
- Yip Kai Koon
- Yiu Tung Public Library
- York Road, Hong Kong
- Youde, Edward
- Young, Mark Aitchison
- Youth Conference
- Yu, Patrick
- Yuen, Anita
- Yucca de Lac
- Yue Chinese
- Yue Man Square
- Yuen Biao
- Yuen Kong Chau
- Yuen Long
- Yuen Long District
- Yuen Long New Town
- Yuen Long Plain
- Yuen Long Town
- Yuen Long Tin Shui Wai Democratic Alliance
- Yuen Wo Road
- Yuen Woo-ping
- Yuen Tsuen Ancient Trail
- Yuen Yuen Institute
- Yuk Hui Temple
- Yuk Wong Kung Din
- Yung, Joey
- Yung Shue Ha
- Yung Shue Tau
- Yung Shue Wan

== Z ==
- Zoological and Botanical Gardens, Hong Kong

== See also ==
- List of Hongkongers
- List of Macao-related topics
- List of China-related topics
- List of Taiwan-related topics
- List of Republic of China-related topics
- List of Tibet-related topics
- Lists of country-related topics
