= NOW.com =

NOW.com (Network of the World) was an online TV/broadband network operated by PCCW Limited.

== Service ==
The network broadcast news and other programmes in primarily in English, Cantonese, Mandarin, as well as select channels in other languages:

- German
- Hindi
- Italian
- Japanese
- Korean
- Portuguese
- Russian
- Spanish

Channels offered include:

- Business - now Business news
- Entertainment - Star World, BBC Prime
- Music - MTV Southeast Asia Channel V
- Indian - STAR Plus
- Movies - HBO, MGM, Cinemax, Star Movies
- Infotainment - Discovery, Animal Planet, CCTV4, CCTV9
- News - CNN International, BBC, Bloomberg News, * Sports - Golf Channel, ESPN

== History ==
NOW was formed by Hong Kong's Richard Li in Hong Kong in 2003. It offers broadband entertainment portal and pay-per channel television service.
