= Man Luen Choon =

Art supply store in Hong Kong

- Type: Chinese Traditional Art
- Industry: Chinese art
- Founded: 1955
- Headquarters: Central, Hong Kong
- Key people: The Lee family
- Website: manluenchoon.com

Man Luen Choon (Chinese: 文聯莊) is a Chinese art supply store in Hong Kong.

== History ==
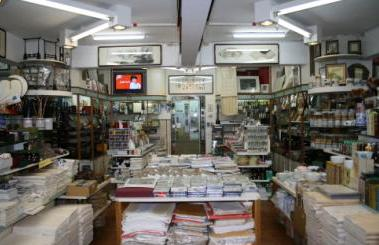
Man Luen Choon's store

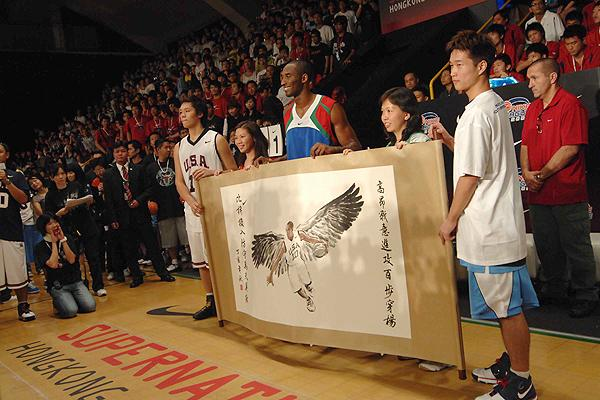
Mounting Calligraphy for Kobe Bryant

Man Luen Choon was founded in 1955 by the Lee family. They have maintained a store in the Central district of Hong Kong since then. They sell art supplies as well as offering mounting, framing, backing, and other services. Their products are imported from mainland China, Taiwan, Korea, and Japan. The current owner is Monty Lee Mon-tat, the son of the founders.

== Art gallery ==
Man Luen Choon's art gallery displays various Chinese artwork by painters including include Zhang Daqian, Xu Beihong, Zhao Shaoang (趙少昂), and others.
