= Joint Organization of Unions – Hong Kong =

- Headquarters: Wan Chai, Hong Kong Island
- Location: Hong Kong
- Key people: Butt Yil Cheung, president
- Affiliations: ITUC

The Joint Organization of Unions – Hong Kong is a trade union centre in Hong Kong. It is affiliated with the International Trade Union Confederation.
