= Fung Shue Wo =

Hong Kong basin

Coordinates: 22.3591°N 114.0997°E

- Traditional Chinese: 楓樹窩
- Simplified Chinese: 枫树窝
Transcriptions
Standard Mandarin
- Hanyu Pinyin: Fēngshù Wō
Yue: Cantonese
- Jyutping: fung1 syu6 wo1

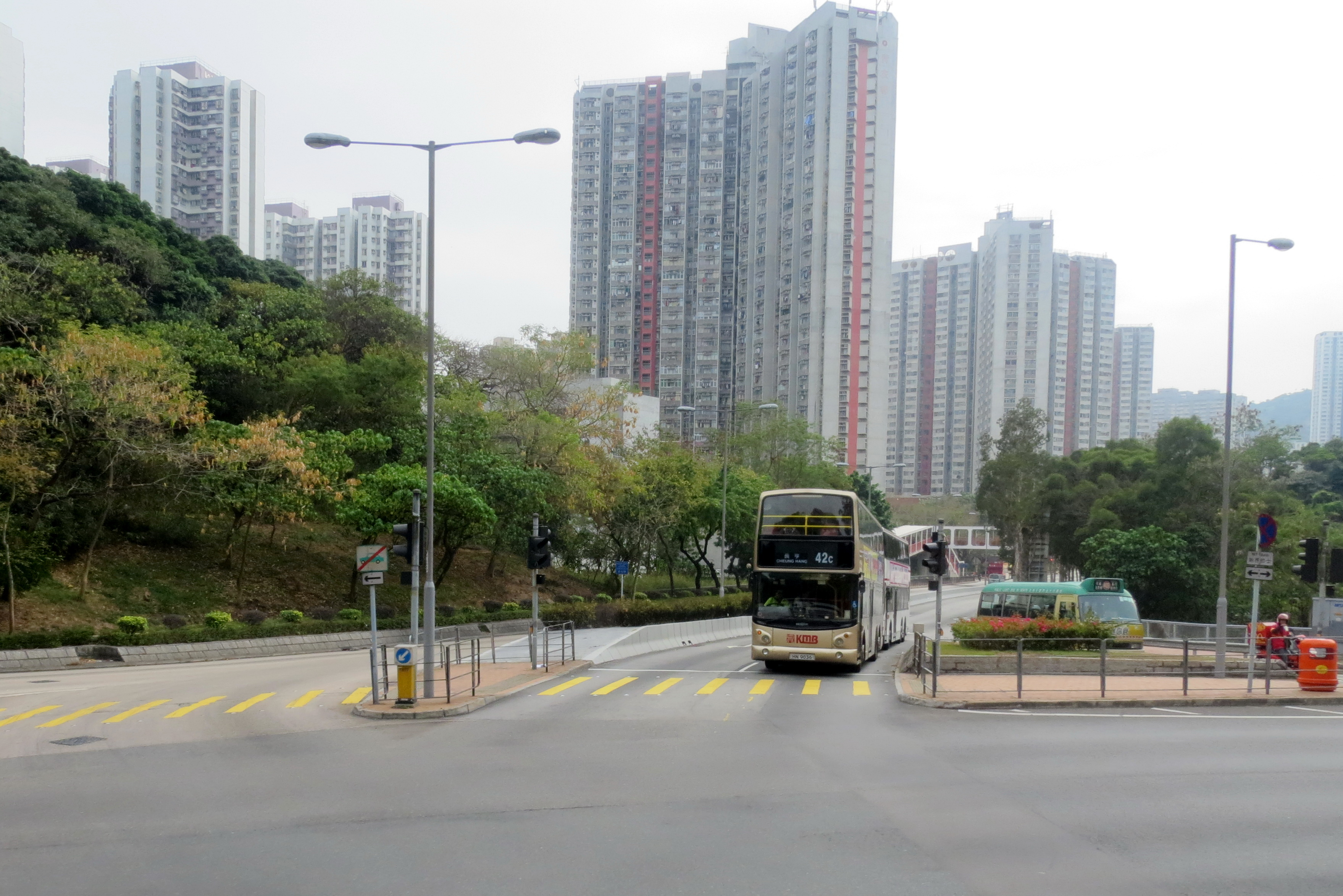
Intersection of Fung Shue Wo Road and Tsing Yi Road West, Tsing Yi, Hong Kong.

Fung Shue Wo (Chinese: 楓樹窩) is a basin in north Tsing Yi Island, Hong Kong. The old villages in the basin have now been replaced by relocated villages from the basin and nearby, including Tsing Yi Hui, Tsing Yu New Village and Fung Shue Wo Tsuen.
