= Chau Tsai =

Chau Tsai may refer to:

- Chau Tsai (Sai Kung District), an island of Hong Kong, off the coast of High Island, in Sai Kung District
- Chau Tsai (Tsing Yi), a former island of Hong Kong, now part of Tsing Yi, as a consequence of land reclamation
