= Hong Kong Institute of Languages =

Language school established in 1985

- HKIL's Logo
- Abbreviation: HKIL
- Founded: 1985
- Type: Private
- Headquarters: Hong Kong
- Location: Wellington Street, Central Hong Kong Island, Hong Kong
- Region served: Hong Kong
- Official language: English, French, Spanish, German, Cantonese, Mandarin, Japanese
- Website: http://www.hklanguages.com

Hong Kong Institute of Languages (HKIL) is a private language school located in Hong Kong. It was founded in 1985 by French couple Dominique and Christian Chasset.

== History ==
The Institute was originally founded as a French language school in Hong Kong, offering French language instruction to business executives. By the 1990s the founding team expanded the institute by providing six additional language offerings, as well as providing classes for children ages two and up.

Today, HKIL offers instruction in English, French, German, Japanese, Spanish, Cantonese, and Mandarin.

== Awards ==
One of the founders of HKIL, Christian Chasset, was awarded the "Chevalier dans l'Ordre des Palmes Academiques" (Knight in the Order of the Academic Palms), the French Government's highest honor for academic achievement for advancing the cause of French culture, education, and the fine arts, on May 28, 2007.

The co-founder of HKIL, Dominique Chasset, was awarded the Ordre National du Mérite ("Knight of the National Order of Merit").
