= History of transport in Hong Kong =

Hong Kong is an important port in the Far East and has relied on entrepôt trade to survive its economy for more than a century.

== Early history ==
Tuen Mun was a military camp and a naval base located in the western part of the present-day territory of Hong Kong during the Tang dynasty of China since 621 AD. The territory of Tuen Mun by then extends from western Shenzhen in the Guangdong Province of the People's Republic of China (PRC) to western Kowloon in Hong Kong.

== Rail transport ==
=== Tramways ===
When the British crown colony of Hong Kong began on the Hong Kong Island in 1842, there was no public transport. The first mode of public transport was the Peak Tram, a funicular railway, operated since 1888. The Hong Kong Tramways, a street-running tram system, started in 1904.

=== Conventional railway ===
The Kowloon Peninsula south of the Boundary Street and the Stonecutters Island was ceded by the then ruling dynasty of China, the Ch'ing dynasty, and was added to the crown colony in 1860; and the New Territories was leased subsequently in 1898. The Kowloon–Canton Railway (now the East Rail line on the MTR system) was built from the southern tip of Kowloon to Canton (now Guangzhou) in the Kwangtung Province (now Guangdong Province) in the 1900s. The British Section was opened in 1910, and the Chinese Section a year later. This is the first conventional railway in Hong Kong.

== Public bus ==
Public bus service was not regulated until 1933, when the Hong Kong government granted franchises to two bus services companies, the China Motor Bus and the Kowloon Motor Bus.
