= Brandon Learning Centre =

- Motto: "Speaking of Success"
- Type: The first and the only English Speaking Board school in HK
- Established: 2006
- Students: students of all ages (from 4 - adult)
- Location: Causeway Bay, Hong Kong; 22°16′37.7″N 114°10′54.5″E
- Affiliations: English Speaking Board
- Website: www.brandoncentre.com

The Brandon Learning Centre is the first school in Hong Kong to offer public speaking classes based around English Speaking Board assessments. The English Speaking Board was founded in 1954 and the qualifications are regulated by the UK Office of Qualifications and Examinations Regulation

The school was founded with the aim of developing confidence in spoken English and preparing students for overseas studies. The initial opening was supported by InvestHK and the school is regulated by the Education Bureau. A second centre opened in Jordan, Kowloon in 2011 and Brandon operates a joint venture programme in China.

The curriculum expanded to include preparation for entry to British, Australian, Canadian and U.S. schools and in 2007 the school began offering both Common Entrance examinations run by the Independent Schools Examination Board including the ISEB pre-test, and Winchester College Entrance examinations. Of the 300+ students enrolled at any one time, between 25 - 35% leave Hong Kong to attend overseas schools including Eton College, Winchester College, Radley College, Cheltenham Ladies' College, Wycombe Abbey, Westminster School, Tonbridge School, Oundle School, Downe House School, Summerfields, Pilgrims and Cothill.

Students compete in a number of external speech competitions including the Hong Kong Schools Speech Festival. The school also holds biannual shows at the Hong Kong Club which benefit Helping Hand, a charity caring for the elderly and Operation Santa Claus which supports a number of Hong Kong charities

Teachers are recruited from the United Kingdom. Students are from varied of backgrounds and range in age from 4 - 13. The school also provides lessons in speech and drama to local schools including Queen's College, Hong Kong, La Salle College, Diocesan Boys' Primary Division Independent Schools Foundation Academy and the Victoria and Shanghai Academy Victoria Educational Organisation.
