= Chuk Yuen =

Chuk Yuen (Chinese: 竹園) may refer to several places in Hong Kong:

- Chuk Yuen (North District), in Ta Kwu Ling, North District
- Chuk Yuen (Sai Kung District), in Sai Kung District
- Chuk Yuen (Wong Tai Sin District) or Chuk Un, in Wong Tai Sin District
- Chuk Yuen (Yuen Long District), in San Tin, Yuen Long District. It includes Sheung Chuk Yuen (上竹園; 'Upper Chuk Yuen') and Ha Chuk Yuen (下竹園; 'Lower Chuk Yuen')

== See also ==
- Chuk Yuen Estate, a public housing estate in Wong Tai Sin
- Chuk Yuen North (constituency), a constituency of the Wong Tai Sin District Council
- Chuk Yuen South (constituency), a constituency of the Wong Tai Sin District Council
