= Centamap =

- Website type: Web Map Service
- Available in: Chinese, English
- Owner: Centaline Property Agency
- Website: http://www.centamap.com
- Commercial: Yes
- Launched: 19 November 1999
- Current status: Operational

Centamap (Chinese: 中原地圖) is a free web map service that displays maps of Hong Kong, launched in 1999. It obtains licensed map data from the Survey and Mapping Office of the Hong Kong Government.

== History ==
Centamap was developed by Centaline Property Agency at a cost of HK$6 million. The website was launched on 19 November 1999; within its first four days it had attracted 100,000-page views per day. At the time, it was one of two digital maps of Hong Kong that had been developed using map data from the government, the other being PCCW's YPmap. Centaline had intended to make money from the website using banner advertising, expecting revenue of $1–1.5 million a year.

== Features ==
The website shows a single, seamless map of Hong Kong, the Community Map on Internet. The data for the Community Map is obtained from the Survey and Mapping Office of the Hong Kong Government's Lands Department, and it is jointly built by Cable & Wireless HKT's Telecom Directories Limited (TDL), Centaline Property Agency, and a Canadian software house. The website shows the locations of various landmarks, places of interest, and property listings. Standard digital map functions are provided, such as searching by address, building name, street intersection and geographic co-ordinates, as well as panning and zooming the map. The map can be zoomed to a scale as low as 1:500 or as high as 1:10,000. The search function utilised data from the Geographic Information System (GIS). The website also showed census data and photographs of scenic places.

An April 2000 review of several digital maps of Hong Kong and Macau in The Asian Wall Street Journal complimented Centamap for having a search facility that allowed users to display, for example, a map showing a hotel by typing the hotel's name. The service was the only one that allowed maps to be easily copied and pasted into other documents. However, the reviewer lamented that the map lacked transport information and displayed only "the income and educational levels of the residents in [an] area", which was probably not useful to a visitor of Hong Kong. Another review in the South China Morning Post that month noted that Centamap's website had a "no-frills" design, worked better in Netscape Navigator than Internet Explorer, and had less features than TDL's HKCityMap, which used the same Community Map data. By July 2001, Centamap had added links to government air pollution indexes across the city, the meteorological department's weather predictions and the government department responsible for selling aerial photographs; a review in the International Herald Tribune commented that the site was a good example of how online maps can provide information that is impossible to present on printed maps.

== Statistics ==
From the website's launch in 1999 to 2003, the average number of monthly page views for its maps increased from 0.1 to 4 million. In November 2003, Centamap was the first mapping service licensed by the Hong Kong Census and Statistics Department to disseminate census data at the building group level in addition to other GIS functions. In March 2007, Centamap was the top website in Hong Kong's online travel market, capturing 16.5% of all website visits in the tourism industry.
