= Organisations with former royal patronage in Hong Kong =

A list of organisations with former royal patronage in Hong Kong prior to the handover in 1997:

== Removal of royal titles ==
Government organisations and agencies

All government organisations dropped the Royal titles on 1 July 1997:

- Hong Kong Police Force – formerly Royal Hong Kong Police Force
  - Hong Kong Auxiliary Police Force – formerly Royal Hong Kong Auxiliary Police Force
- Hong Kong Observatory – formerly Royal Observatory

Crowns and crest of disciplinary services were removed from the uniforms after the handover and replaced with the bauhinia:

- Hong Kong Fire Service
- Hong Kong Police Force
  - Hong Kong Auxiliary Police Force
- Customs and Excise Department (Hong Kong)
- Hong Kong Correctional Services
- Civil Aid Service
- All court rooms

Hongkong Post removed the Queen's head and crowns off stamps long before the handover. Post boxes were repainted and older pillar boxes with crowns were removed from use.

Hospitals and private organisations

Hospitals and other non-government organisations with royal names were not renamed, but they dropped their royal patrons:

- Hong Kong Jockey Club – formerly Royal Hong Kong Jockey Club
- Hong Kong Golf Club – formerly Royal Hong Kong Golf Club
- Queen Elizabeth Hospital, Hong Kong
- Queen Mary Hospital (Hong Kong)
- Princess Margaret Hospital (Hong Kong)
- Prince of Wales Hospital
- The Duchess of Kent Children's Hospital at Sandy Bay
- Society for the Prevention of Cruelty to Animals (Hong Kong) – formerly Royal Society for the Prevention of Cruelty to Animals

After 1997, some of the organisations removed the Royal title and/or removed symbols connecting to the Royal ties.

== Pre-handover disbanding or replacement ==
Some organisations removed their titles long before the handover, namely by changing their name or disbanding:

- Royal Hong Kong Auxiliary Air Force – disbanded in 1993 and replaced with the Government Flying Service (Hong Kong)
- Royal Hong Kong Regiment (The Volunteers) – disbanded in 1995

== After handover exceptions ==
A few remaining organisations with royal titles remaining in Hong Kong include:

- Royal Asiatic Society Hong Kong Branch
- Royal Hong Kong Police Association
- Royal Hong Kong Yacht Club
- Royal Geographical Society (Hong Kong)
- Royal Society of Biology Hong Kong Branch

== See also ==
- List of golf clubs granted Royal status
- List of yacht clubs granted Royal status
