= Fok Tak Temple =

Coordinates: 22.297734°N 114.170109°E

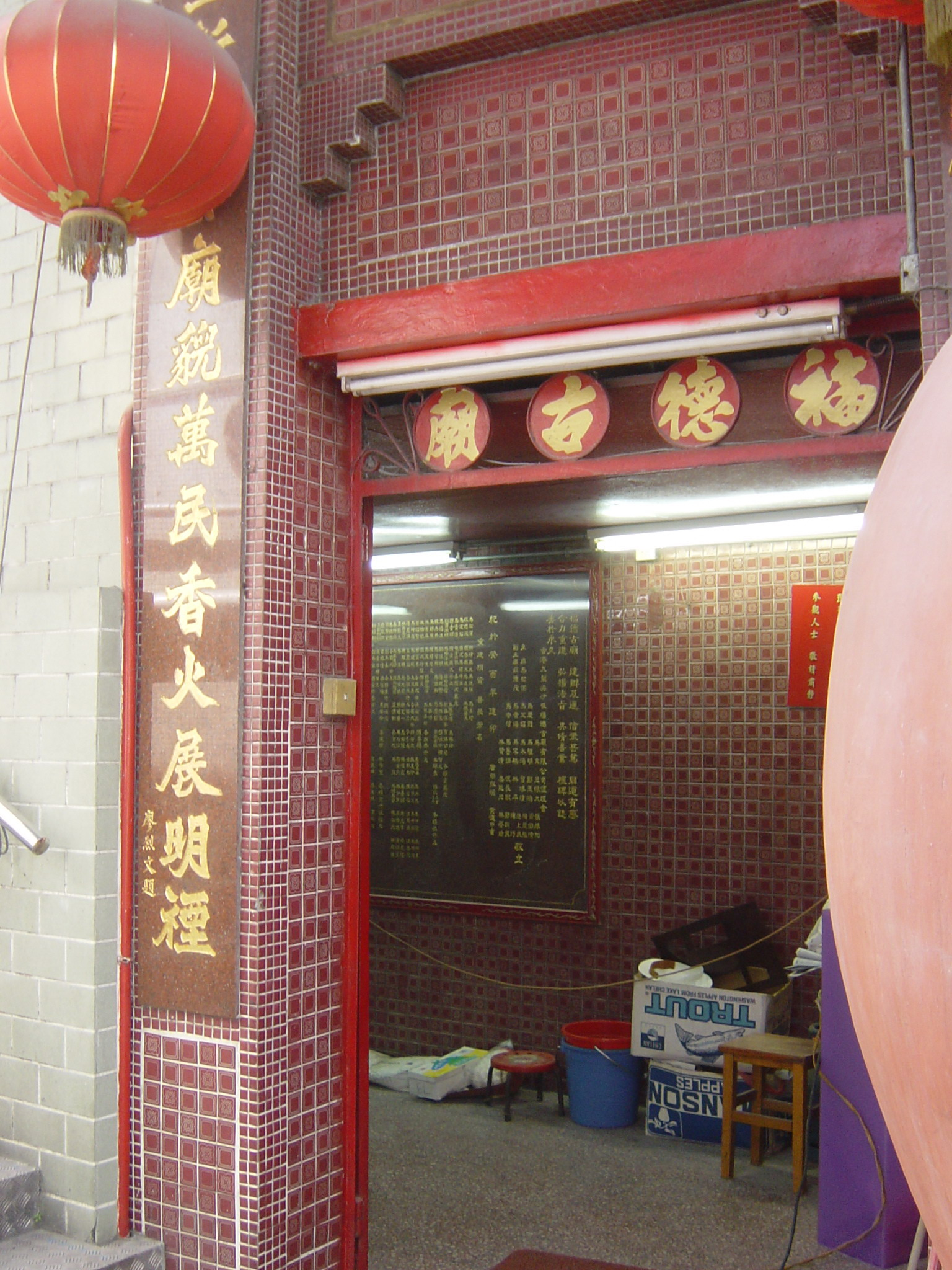
Fok Tak Temple in Tsim Sha Tsui

Fok Tak Temple (Chinese: 福德古廟; Jyutping: fuk1 dak1 gu2 miu6) is the only Chinese temple in Tsim Sha Tsui, Kowloon, Hong Kong. Located on Haiphong Road, the current structure of the temple dates back to 1900. The temple was renovated in 1979 and 1993.
