= John Walden =

Hong Kong politician (1925–2013)

John Charles Creasey Walden (Chinese: 華樂庭; 17 April 1925–2013) was a London-born member of the colonial administration in Hong Kong from 1951 until his retirement 1980. He graduated in 1950 from Merton College, Oxford, with a second class degree in geography. He also studied Chinese at the School of Oriental and African Studies in London and at the University of Hong Kong.

== Political career ==
Walden joined the Colonial Administrative Service in 1950 and became a member of the Hong Kong government in 1951. He served in the Secretariat for Chinese Affairs, in the New Territories Administration as District Officer and Deputy District Commissioner for nine years, in the Urban Services Department, the Commerce and Industry Department, Housing Department, and in the Colonial Secretariat. During that time he was a member of the Executive and Legislative Council, the Urban Council, the Housing Authority among many other committees.

Between 1976 and 1980, Walden was Director of Home Affairs with the goal of monitoring public opinion. He retired in 1980 to dedicate his life to studying public accountability in Hong Kong as a free-lance researcher. He was an Honorary Research Fellow at the Centre of Asian Studies of the University of Hong Kong. He returned to England in 2010, and died in 2013, aged 88, in Sturminster Newton, Dorset.

== Publications ==
- Excellency, Your Gap is Showing: Six Critiques on British Colonial Government in Hong Kong (1983) OCLC 10554139
- Excellency, Your Gap is Growing: Six Talks on a Chinese Takeaway (1987)

== See also ==
- Resettlement Department
