= Leung So Kee =

Hong Kong umbrella manufacturer

Leung So Kee Umbrella Factory 梁蘇記遮廠
- Type: Private
- Industry: Manufacturing
- Founded: 1885; 141 years ago
- Founder: Leung Chi Wah (梁智華), also known as Leung So (梁蘇)
- Headquarters: Shop G36, G/F, Site B & C Park Lane Shopper’s Boulevard, 111-181 Nathan Road, Tsim Sha Tsui, Kowloon, Hong Kong
- Products: Umbrellas
- Services: Umbrella repair
- Owner: Leung Man Shing (梁孟誠)
- Website: leungsokee.com

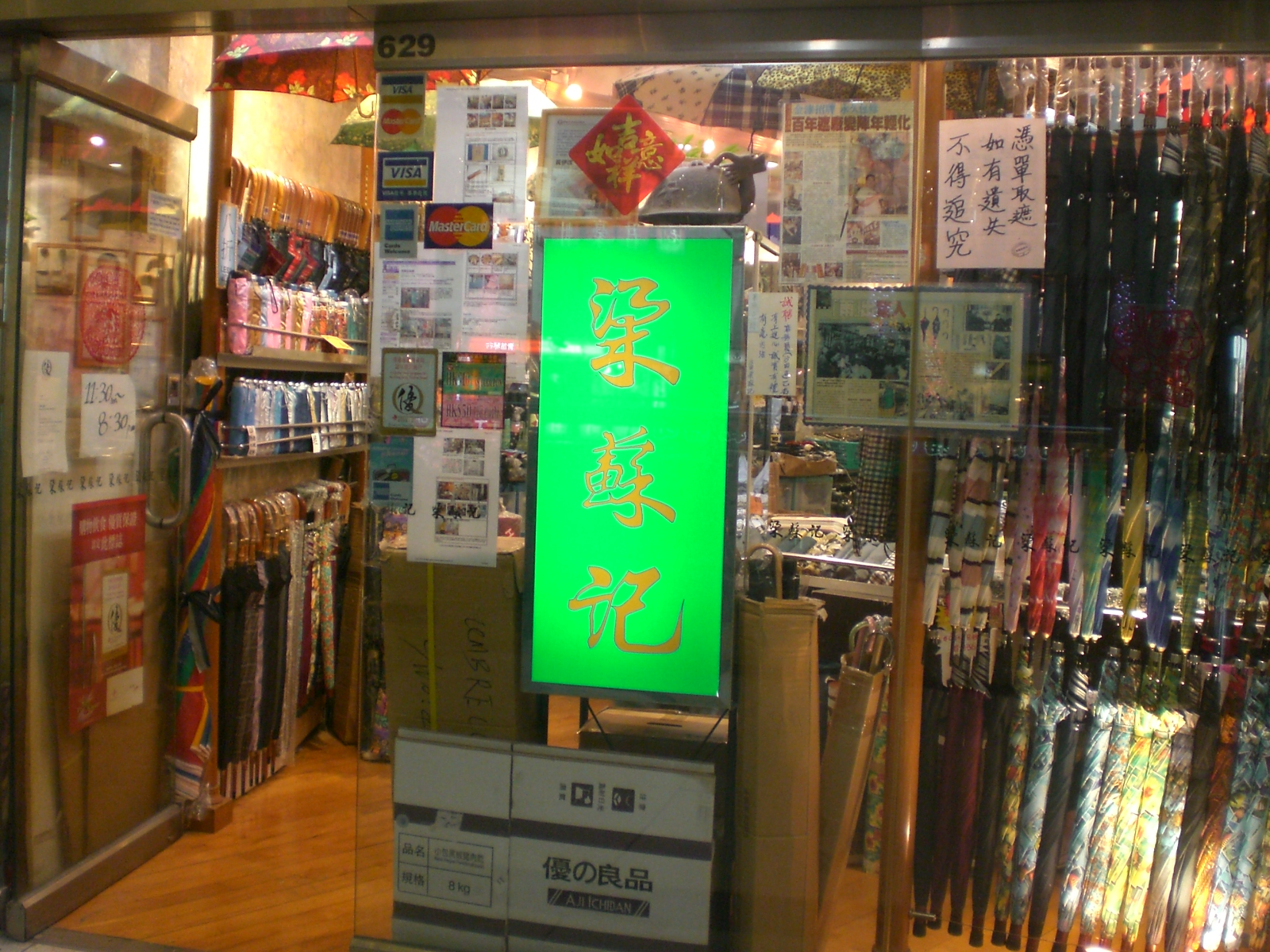
Flagship store of Leung So Kee in Dragon Centre, Sham Shui Po (closed on March 3, 2023 and relocated to Park Lane Shopper’s Boulevard in Tsim Sha Tsui on March 4, 2023)

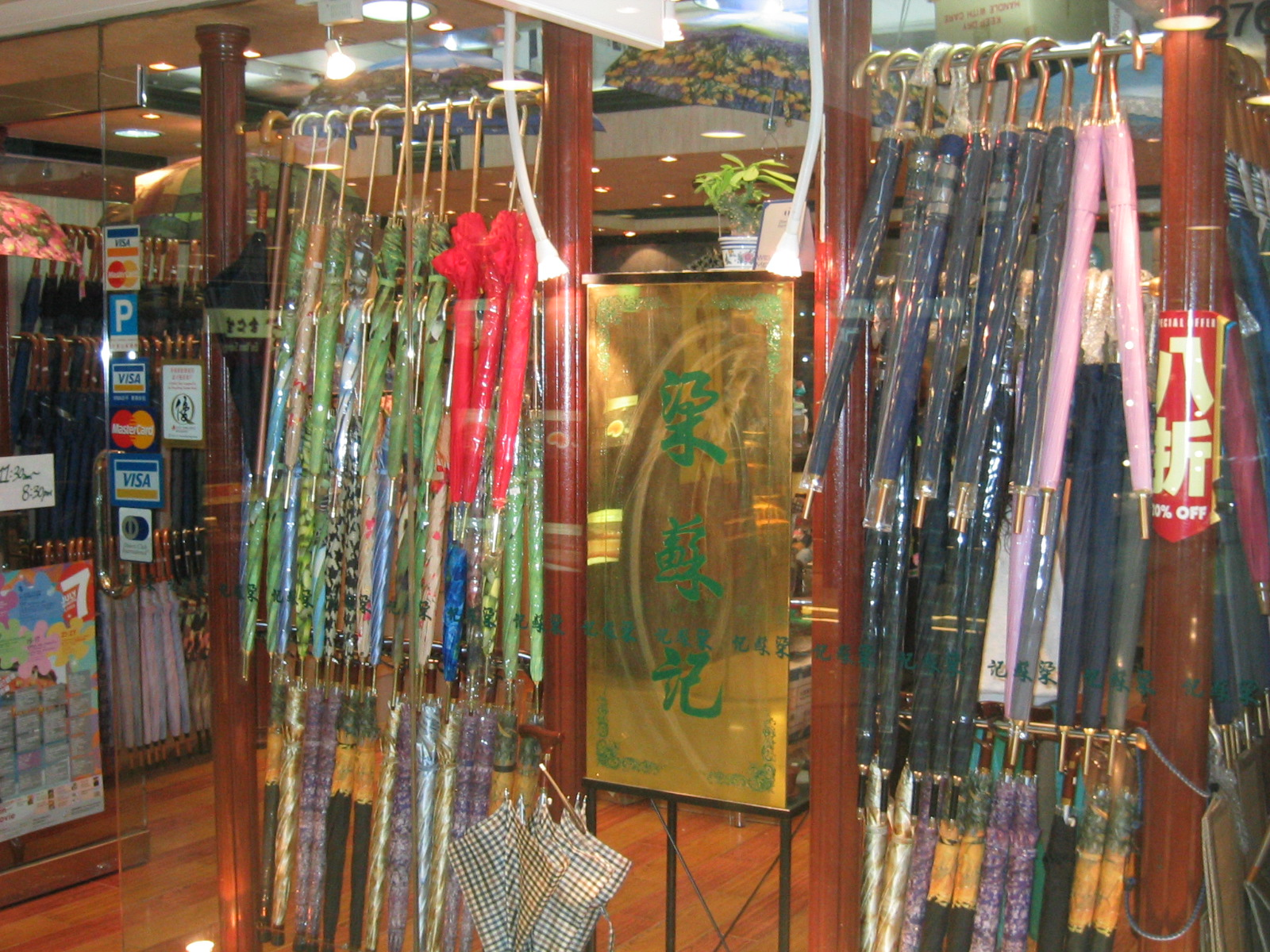
Former shop in New Town Plaza, Sha Tin

Leung So Kee Umbrella Factory (Chinese: 梁蘇記遮廠) is an umbrella manufacturer and retailer in Hong Kong.

The history of Leung So Kee can be traced back to 1885, when its first shop was opened in Guangzhou by Leung So (梁蘇). Leung So Kee was famous for its steel-frame umbrellas and lifelong guarantee. The current owner of Leung So Kee is Leung Man Shing (梁孟誠), the great-grandchild of Leung So (梁蘇).

== History ==
Leung So Kee Umbrella Factory was founded in 1885 or 1886 in Huiai Xilu, Guangzhou (廣州惠愛西路) by Leung So (梁蘇).

In 1920, the first branch of Leung So Kee was opened in Guangzhou. A branch was opened in Macau in 1923.

In 1950, following the Chinese Communist Revolution, the whole family business moved to Hong Kong. Business was brisk, with the company selling 20,000 umbrellas a year in the 1950s. The durability of their products earned the firm contracts with the Urban Services Department, Hong Kong Telephone, and Hong Kong Tramways.

In 1987, the Leung So Kee business (stores in Sham Shui Po, Mang Kok, San Po Kong) was passed on to the fourth generation member of the Leung family, Leung Man Shing (梁孟誠).

In 1994, the flagship shop of Leung So Kee was opened in Dragon Centre, Sham Shui Po.

In 2006, the branch of Leung So Kee was opened in Sha Tin Centre, Sha Tin when its shop in New Town Plaza, Sha Tin was closed.

On March 4, 2023, the Leung So Kee branch in Dragon Centre in Sham Shui Po has been relocated to Park Lane Shopper’s Boulevard in Tsim Sha Tsui.

== Products and services ==
Leung So Kee is a handmade umbrella store with a wide range of umbrellas and repairing service, from sun umbrella to mini folding umbrella. It offers custom-made umbrella services, which took about four hours to finish. The most expensive umbrella sold by Leung So Kee costs HK$1,380. The umbrellas of Leung So Kee are still handmade. Leung So Kee still provide a lifetime warranty on its umbrella frames.

In the 1960s to 1970s, Leung So Kee had several retail shops in Hong Kong, including one in Mong Kok. Leung So Kee currently only has one retail shop in Hong Kong. It is located at Park Lane Shopper’s Boulevard, Tsim Sha Tsui.

== In popular culture ==
- A drama film called The Umbrella Story (人間有情) was written by Raymond To and based on the story of Leung So Kee.
- The drama was later made into a film of the same title, directed and produced by Clifton Ko.
- There was also a stage play performed based on the script written by Raymond To.
- Leung So Kee umbrellas were utilized in Tsui Hark's martial arts film Once Upon a Time in China (1991) as a weapon wielded by the protagonist Wong Fei-hung, played by Jet Li. Leung So-kee remembered that the movie's props department ordered 26 umbrellas over the course of filming, saying that the first two they ordered broke during a fight scene. So-kee's response was to laugh and say, "Of course! The umbrellas are not for kung fu."
