= 2020s in Hong Kong =

The 2020s in Hong Kong refers to Hong Kong during the current period of Hong Kong from 2020 until present under the People's Republic of China (PRC).

== Politics ==
=== 2020 National security law ===
2020 National security law, implemented on 30 June 2020, is the piece of national security legislation concerning Hong Kong.

=== 2020 National anthem ordinance ===
2020 National anthem ordinance, implemented on 12 June 2020, criminalises "insults to the national anthem of China" ("March of the Volunteers").

=== 2021 Hong Kong electoral reform ===
2021 Hong Kong electoral reform, implemented on 11 March 2021 by the National People's Congress (NPC), the sole legislative body of the People's Republic of China (PRC), in order to "amend electoral rules and improve the electoral system of the Hong Kong Special Administrative Region (HKSAR) for its Chief Executive (CE) and the Legislative Council (LegCo), in order to ensure a system in which patriots govern Hong Kong and plug existing loopholes that allow foreign interference in Hong Kong's internal affairs.

== Health ==
COVID-19 pandemic in Hong Kong
