= John C.S. Lui =

Hong Kong engineer

Academic background
- Thesis: Large Markov models for computer performance and reliability analysis: efficient methods for determination of error bounds (1991)
- Doctoral advisor: Richard Robert Muntz

Chinese name
- Traditional Chinese: 呂自成
- Simplified Chinese: 吕自成
- Hanyu Pinyin: Lǚ Zìchéng
- Yale Romanization: Léuih Jih-sìhng

John Chi-Shing Lui is a Hong Kong computer scientist. He was the chairman of the Department of Computer Science & Engineering in the Chinese University of Hong Kong. He received his Ph.D. in computer science from UCLA. When he was a Ph.D. student at UCLA, he spent a summer working in IBM's Thomas J. Watson Research Center. After his graduation, he joined the IBM Almaden Research Laboratory/San Jose Laboratory and participated in various research and development projects on file systems and parallel I/O architectures. He later joined the Department of Computer Science and Engineering at the Chinese University of Hong Kong. For the past several summers, he has been a visiting professor in computer science departments at UCLA, Columbia University, University of Maryland at College Park, Purdue University, University of Massachusetts Amherst and Universita' degli Studi di Torino in Italy.

He actively runs INFOCOM events and service work. He is leading a group of research students in the Advanced Networking & System Research Group. His research interests include theory and mathematics. His current research interests are in theoretical topics in data networks, distributed multimedia systems, network security, OS design issues and mathematical optimization and performance evaluation theory. Lui received various departmental teaching awards and the CUHK Vice-Chancellor's Exemplary Teaching Award in 2001. He is a co-recipient of the IFIP WG 7.3 Performance 2005 Best Student Paper Award. Currently, he is an associate editor in the Performance Evaluation Journal, Fellow of the Association for Computing Machinery (2009), Fellow of IEEE (2010), and an elected member in the IFIP WG 7.3. Lui was the TPC co-chair of ACM Sigmetrics 2005, and is on the board of directors in ACM Sigmetrics. Lui is the general co-chair of the International Conference on Network Protocols (ICNP) 2006. His personal interests include films and general reading.
