= 2010s in Hong Kong =

The 2010s in Hong Kong refers to Hong Kong during the period from 2010 until 2019 under the People's Republic of China (PRC), in which this period of this decade were marred by the political instability, as well as the health crisis that occurs in the end of 2019.

== Politics ==
=== Umbrella Revolution ===
The Umbrella Revolution erupted spontaneously in September 2014 in protest of a decision by China's Standing Committee of the National People's Congress (NPCSC) on proposed electoral reform. The austere package provoked mobilisation by students, and the effects became amplified into a political movement involving hundreds of thousands of Hong Kongers by heavy-handed policing and government tactics.

=== 2019–20 Hong Kong protests ===
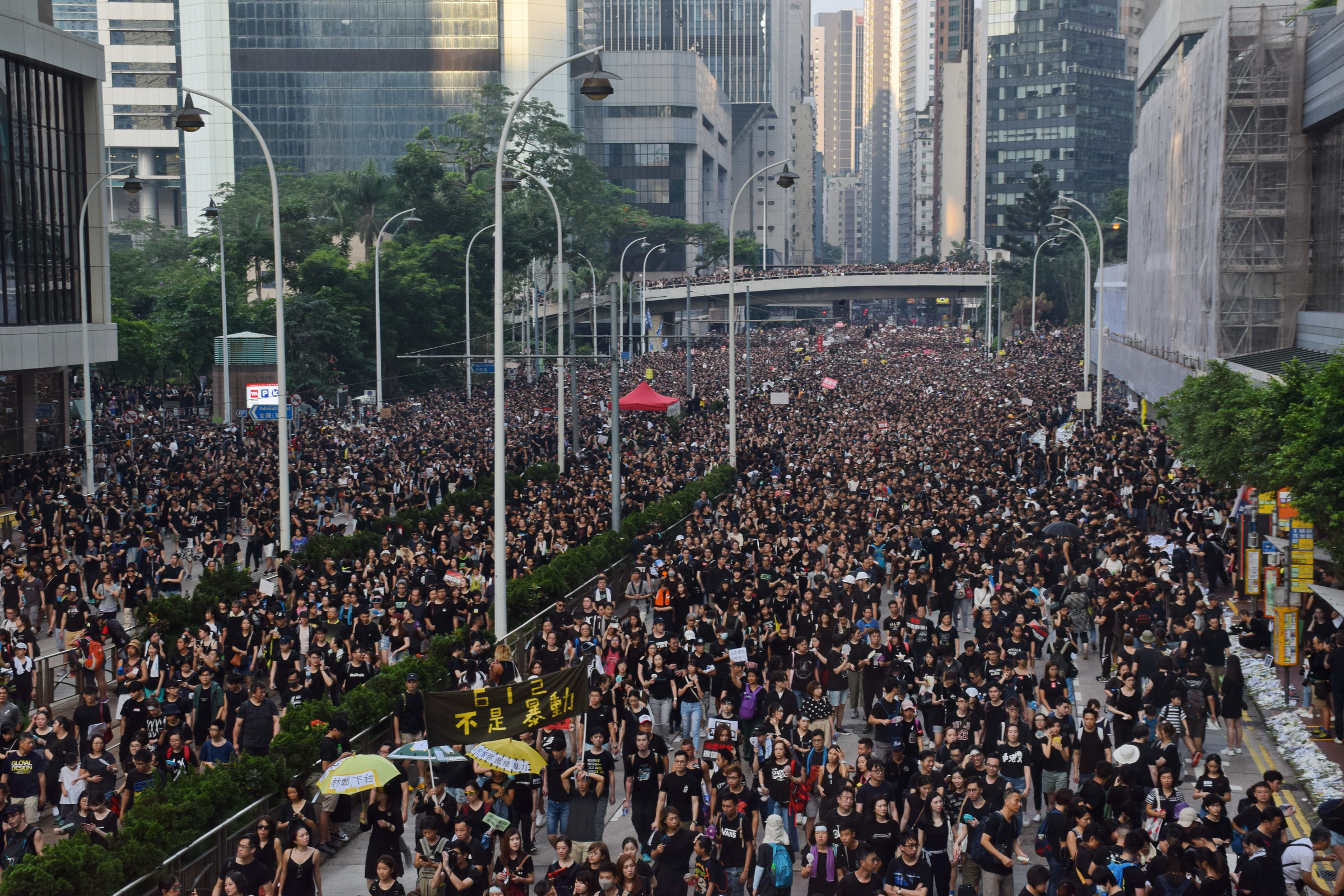
A protest march on Hong Kong Island on 16 June 2019

In 2019, mass protest erupted in response to the Hong Kong government's introduction of a bill that would allow for extradition of individuals to mainland China. In response to escalating police brutality, and in continuation of longstanding efforts to achieve democracy in the territory, the protest movement's objective became the realisation of five key demands. The protests were the largest in Hong Kong's history, affecting all corners of the territory. The 2019 District Council elections, widely regarded as a referendum on the government and the protest movement, resulted in a landslide victory for the pro-democracy bloc. Large-scale protests were halted by the outbreak of the COVID-19 pandemic in January 2020. Most opposition lawmakers were subsequently disqualified or resigned in protest, and many were imprisoned. In mid-2020, China imposed a sweeping national security law on Hong Kong that effectively stamped out most dissent and sparked a wave of mass migration from Hong Kong.

== Media ==
=== Decline of Asia Television and relaunch as streaming platform ===
One of the oldest television network in Hong Kong, Asia Television suffers the decline since the transfer of several stakes of network to Chinese property businessman Wang Zheng. Since the takeover, Asia Television attempting to convert current channels to news channel network which known as the CNN of Asia by replacing the television drama series to talk show and news program had further contributed to additional decline of viewership of Asia Television. In addition, the news reporting from Asia Television which were inaccurate and biased had led to backlash from both community and the central government, especially the false reporting of the death of Jiang Zemin, former General Secretary of the Chinese Communist Party on 6 July 2011, and the biased reporting against the group of anti-Moral and National Education students. Asia Television also suffers from financial issues, especially their inability to pay wages to their employees, and unpaid bills to Hop Chung Tourist Car Company, a long-time transport contractor of ATV, which both these incident has led to several lawsuit filed against the broadcast company.

The decline and troubling nature of Asia Television results in Executive Council's decision to not renew Asia Television's over-the-air broadcasting license, while at the same time approving the over-the-air broadcasting license to another broadcaster, HK Television Entertainment (known as ViuTV), on 1 April 2015. The revoke of the license were followed by the liquidation process of ATV and its assets which laid off all the staffs and winding down the operation of ATV with assistance from Deloitte on 26 February 2016. The last day for the ATV over-the-air broadcasting is on 1 April 2016, in which the following day, their former broadcast spectrum were taken over by RTHK TV 31, CGTN Documentary and ViuTV.

In December 2017, Asia Television was revived as OTT service which has its content streamed over the internet instead of relying on over-the-air broadcasting. Among the programs that are offered from online services including the revival edition of Hong Kong version of Who Wants to Become a Millionaire and Miss Asia Pageant, as well as ATV original dramas and documentaries.
