= Reclaim Sheung Shui Station =

Reclaim Sheung Shui Station was a series of social movements which took place at Sheung Shui MTR station from 15 to 18 September 2012. The protests were a response to the smuggling and parallel trading problem in Hong Kong.

== Overview ==
Protestors claim that the parallel traders from mainland and Hong Kong have congested Sheung Shui Station, suspected of smuggling, long-term occupation of nearby passages at Sheung Shui while indirectly taking it up as a cause of inflation of certain goods, seriously affecting the neighbourhood nearby. There were about 350 netizens respond to the call made within social networks, including HKGolden forum and Facebook. They concentrated the demonstration at Exit C of Sheung Shui MTR station. The campaign lasted for more than 4 hours on both days.

== Parallel trading ==
Since the Individual Visit Scheme has been implemented in 2003, more and more people from mainland China visit Hong Kong and buy a lot of daily necessities, such as infant formula, then they would carry a great amount of goods back to China, and these kinds of people are parallel traders. Parallel traders are mainly active near the MTR East-Rail Stations, especially in Sheung Shui Station. They often line up next to the station and distribute the goods that they have bought.

In Hong Kong, there are general agency companies distributing orders to the supermarkets and shops for wholesaling. Any trading activities that has bypassed the distribution from general agency company and sourced their goods by the seller itself either from overseas or mainland in order to escape from taxation would be considered as parallel trading. In explaining the situation in Sheung Shui, shops are selling their goods in bulk to those mainlanders and Hongkongers to carry across the border for the receivers at Shenzhen. Some of them will also sell to the tourists. The products that are being carried across the border will be then parallel trading products while considering the whole activity as a parallel trade. Sometimes, shops in Shatin will even take bulk orders from shops across the broader that may involve illegal smuggling activities.

== Process ==
=== 15 September 2012 ===
On 15/9 at 2pm, hundreds of netizens respond to the call on the social network and gathered at the Exit C of Sheung Shui MTR station for the demonstration, screaming the slogan of "defending the nest" (保衛家園), in exaggerating seriousness of how the parallel trading industry has affected the life of the resident living in Sheung Shui. Protestor abused the parallel traders whenever they saw them, they also called them "locusts". Later these two groups of people fought with each other. Police set up some barricades in order to divide the two groups and stable the situation. The protesters left at around 6:30p.m

=== 16 September 2012 ===
The next day, over a hundred netizens continued the restoration campaign at Sheung Shui, with about 350 people at maximum. During the campaign, a protester held a flag of "Hong Kong" causing the dissatisfaction of the onlookers from Hong Kong and mainlands. It also led to opposition from the supporters as they thought that the whole campaign had deteriorated. Since there was no sign of parallel traders on the day of protest, there was no confrontation between any party on that day. However, one of the protesters had been escorted by the police to leave the area because of him causing troubles to the neighbourhood.

After that, the protest group then marched to one of the major collecting and distributing centres at Advanced Technology Centre and the security has to shut down the gate to prevent riots from happening. Other than that, members from Hong Kong Autonomy Movement set up stations on the footbridge near Sheung Shui MTR station to collect signatures from the residents nearby in order to raise their concerns to the government and take immediate actions to restrict Individual Visit Scheme and to combat the parallel trading problems. The campaign lasted about four hours. The protesters then left.

=== 18 September 2012 ===
At around 8 pm, the protesters and residents from Sheung Shui gathered again at Sheung Shui Station to strangle the parallel trading activities claiming that the parallel traders have caused a great level of inconvenience to the neighbourhood nearby. They quarrelled with each other, causing disruptions in the area. Some even challenged the police line of control. Police officers have dispatched to maintain the order.

Before the event happened, the Secretary of Security Lai Tung-Kwok said that the situation has been improved since both of the Customs and Excise Department of Shenzhen and Hong Kong started to combat these activities. He also mentioned that the obstruction outside Lo Wu and Sheung Shui Station have been improved and those parallel traders were no longer active in others ports

== Government response ==
The government has implemented different measures in response to parallel trading in order to help restoration in Sheung Shui.

For the internal measures, the Hong Kong Government has announced to the public that they would have six major steps to combat the problem, including the removal of the traders' goods when they caused blockage of street and the warning to people who caused dispute and negative influences to the locals. The Customs and Excise Department and the Food and Environmental Hygiene Department has increased the manpower at Lo Wo port and Lok Ma Chau port and send some plain-clothed staffs and spies to collect information from the parallel traders and to revise the appearance of Sheung Shui respectively.

Besides, the Hong Kong Police Force has enforced the surveillance on the parallel traders and maintain the order and send the Police Tactical Unit to the industrial centre to blockade both entrance and exit so as to drive them away. They also strictly measured the size of traders' baggage and strictly abide by the law. The Hong Kong Police Force has combined with other law-enforced departments to take sudden inspection at different black spots of parallel trading in Sheung Shui.

For the external measures, the Hong Kong Government has cooperated with the Shenzhen government to combat the parallel trading problem together in order to help restoration in Sheung Shui. The Shenzhen government exchanged some private information regarding the parallel trading to the Hong Kong government and carry out a campaign together.

== See also ==
- Anti-parallel trading protests
