= Hong Kong Student Welfare Association =

Federation of Hong Kong student's union

Hong Kong Federation of Student's Union (Chinese: 香港學生會總會；簡稱：FSU；前稱：香港學生福利聯盟 Hong Kong Students Welfare Association) is the largest youth organization in Hong Kong, with approximately 84,000 members. It was founded in 2000 and is made up of more than 70 students' associations or students' councils in Hong Kong. The best known part of the association is its Welfare Department which arranges discounts in many Hong Kong shops. It also sells sports equipment and stationery to students. The Educational Department holds inter-school competitions in different subjects.

== Activities ==
The Activities' Department is responsible for holding different activities among schools, such as Christmas Ball, SWA Badminton Cup, SWA Football Cup, SWA Basketball Cup and communication with mainland students.

== Influence ==
The association is a non-political organization and its popularity derives from its sports cups and the discounts it arranges for students.
