= RWB 330 =

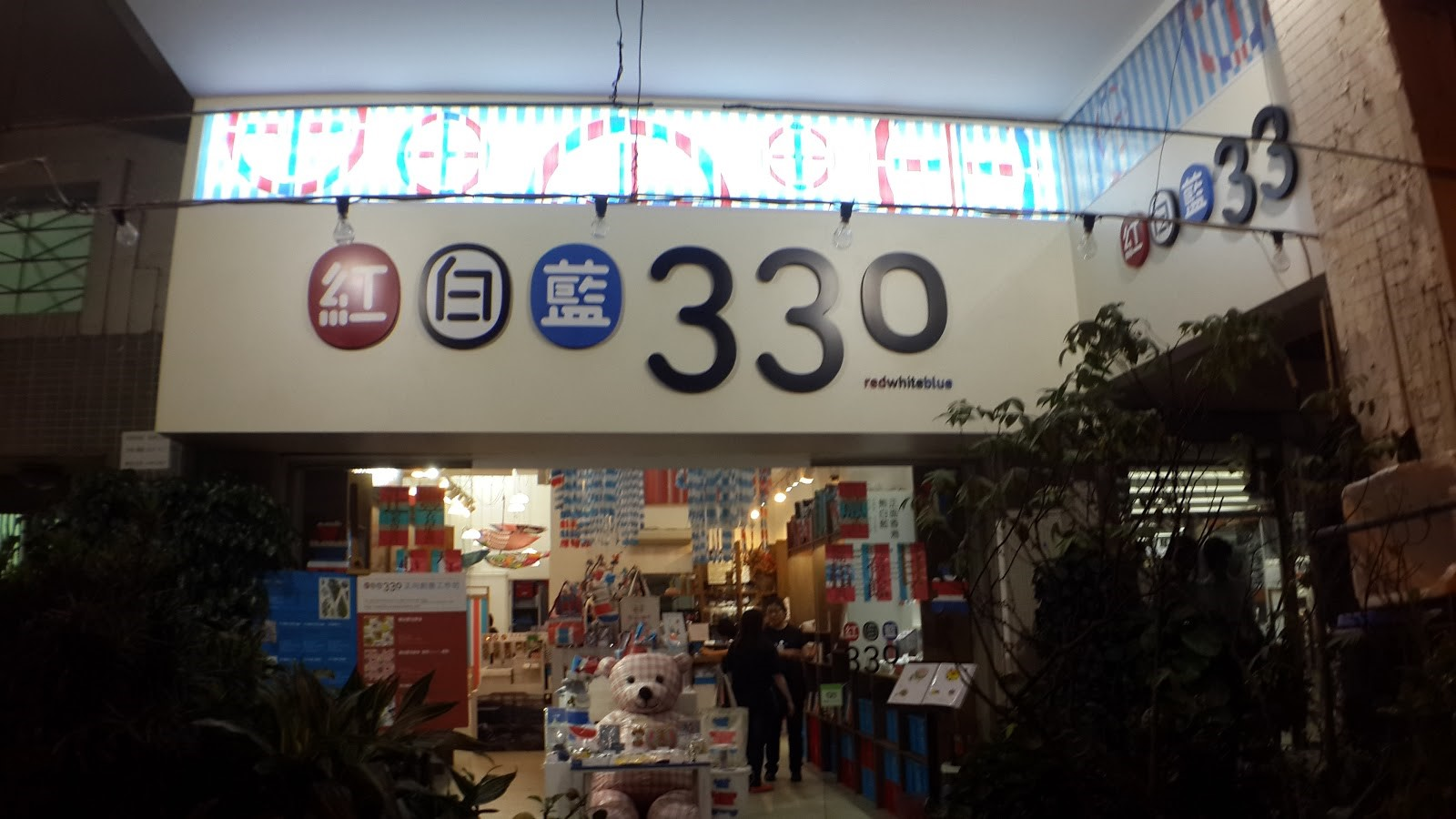
- RWB 330 Concept Store, located on 192 Prince Edward Road West in Kowloon, Hong Kong

RWB 330 (traditional Chinese: 紅白藍330; simplified Chinese: 红白蓝330) is a social enterprise in Hong Kong connecting mental health and creativity. RWB stands for red-white-blue, which is a traditional plastic bag commonly used in Hong Kong in the 1960s and 1970s. ‘330’ is similar to the phonetic sound of “body, mind and spirit” in Cantonese. (Chinese: 身、心、靈). It cooperates New Life Psychiatric Rehabilitation Association. The products being sold in the RWB 330 concept store feature on red-white-blue plastic woven fabric, which is made from either polyethylene (PE) or polypropylene (PP), and are handmade by patients recovering from mental illnesses.

RWB 330 was given the HKDC Design for Asia Award (Bronze) in 2012 for translating Hong Kong’s unyielding and diligent spirits through creativity.

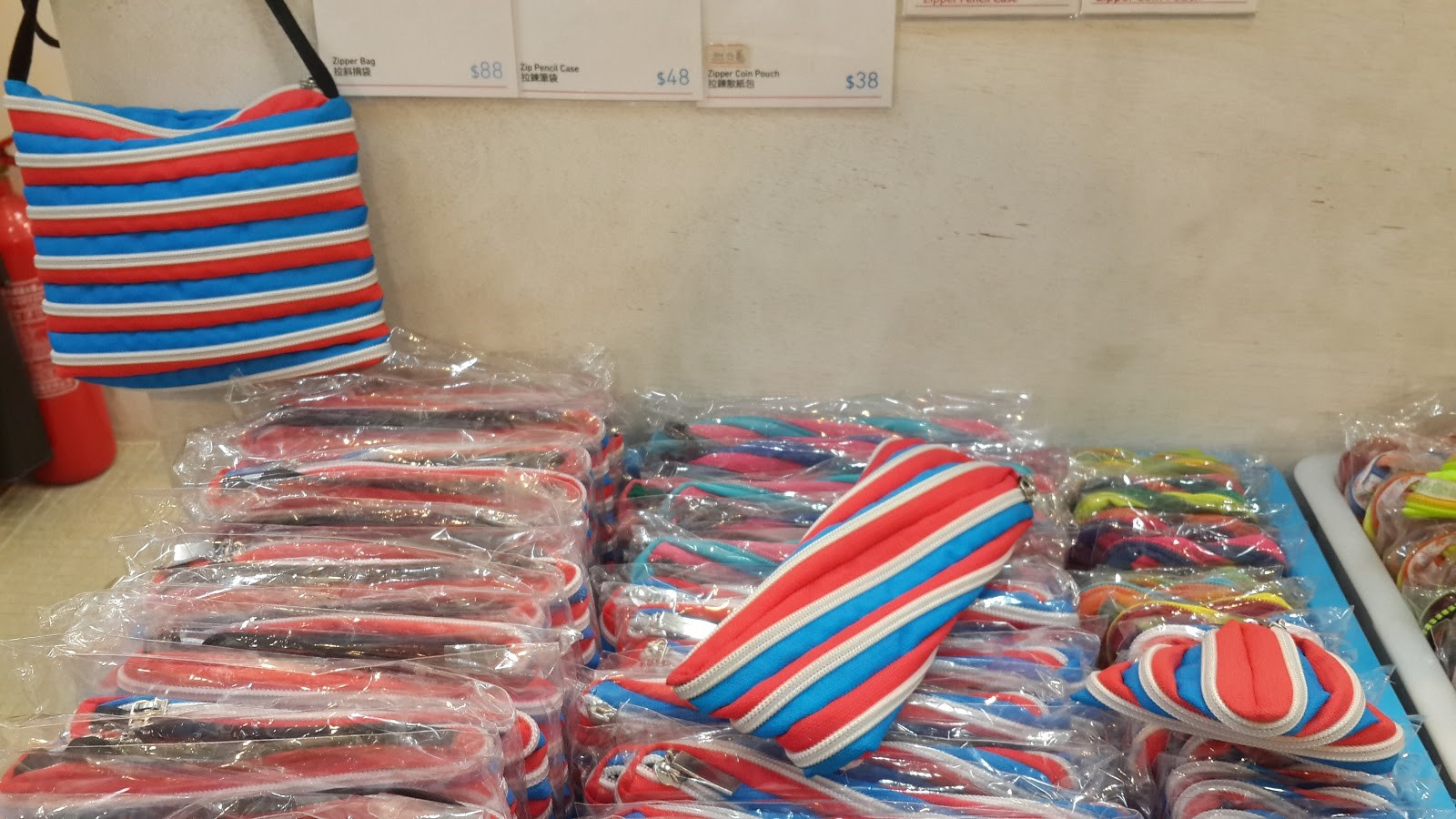
RWB 330 Pencil Cases and Wallets

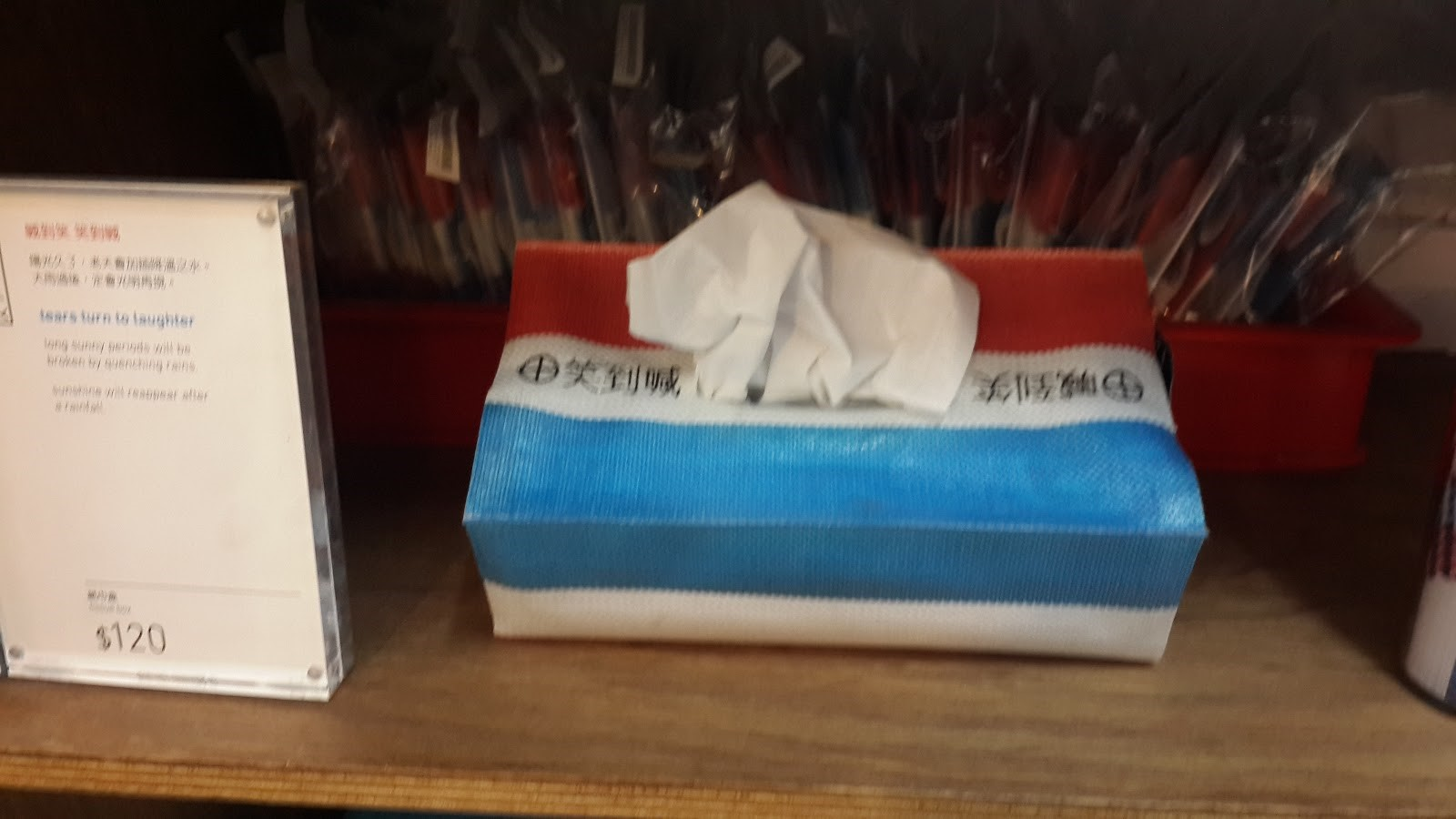
RWB 330 Tissue Box Cover

== History ==
Since 2000, Mr. Wong Ping-pui, Stanley has integrated red-white-blue into his artwork. People called him the father of red-white-blue for promoting the positive spirit of Hong Kong through red-white-blue.

In 2006, there was a series of red-white-blue products launched by people who had recovered from mental disorder in New Life Psychiatric Rehabilitation Association. In October 2011, Urban Renewal Authority invited several non-governmental organizations to submit a proposal for the operation right of the shop in Prince Edward Road. RWB 330 by New Life Psychiatric Rehabilitation Association won other nine proposals and gained the operation right. RWB 330 became the first social enterprise to cooperate with Urban Renewal Authority.

In 2012, Stanley worked with New Life Psychiatric Rehabilitation Association. They built the first RWB 330 concept shop in Hong Kong. In May 2012, they opened the “RWB 330” concept shop at Prince Edward Road. Around 2014 or 2015, the lease was set to expire.

== Theme ==
RWB 330 is furnished with “red-white-blue” materials and themed on “Positive Hong Kong”. RWB represents fortitude, adaptability and industriousness of Hong Kong people, becoming popular in the 70s and 80s when Hong Kong experienced rapid economic development. Inspired by that, the store decided to have a theme about integrating the artistic atmosphere of modern art and the 60’s – 70’s of Hong Kong. The rationale of the store is encouraging positive thinking, holistic health (“330”) and serving people during their recovery process to integrate into society, as well as reaching self-reliance.

== Charity Works ==
Sales in RWB store go to fund the New Life Psychiatric Rehabilitation Association for servicing the recovering patients. At the same time, six job vacancies of the shop in which at least five of them are for those in rehabilitation. Some patients need time to adjust in the environment whereas some of them have worked for several years in its social enterprise. Other than that, RWB 330 produced a dim sum magnet set to recognize mental-health recovery as a therapy initiative.

== Partners ==
=== Prudence Mak ===
Chocolate Rain, which is founded by Prudence Mak, sells her products on consignment in RWB 330. The design’s inspiration originates from childhood dream and wonderland adventure. Chocolate Rain conveys the message of preserving the environment, advocates positive attitude and expressing originality through its products, which are filled with imagination and heart.

=== Steve Yuen ===
The illustration of New Life’s ‘We Love Hong Kong Products’ is done by Steve Yuen, who is an experienced illustrator in Hong Kong.

=== C AllStar ===
Local quartet C AllStar, which is formed by Kenny Chan, King Wu, Jase Ho and Andy Leung, shoulders the role of the RWB 330 Positive Ambassador. They are responsible for spreading the message of ‘Positive Hong Kong’ over the community.

=== The Hong Kong Design Institute (HKDI) ===
Students of the Department of Fashion Design and Brand Strategy of HKDI collaborate with the service users of Salvation Army Shaukiwan Day Activity Centre and St. James' Settlement (Hong Kong) Rehabilitation Service Centre. So as to hearten citizens to be optimistic and durable in daily lives, they utilize the textile waste to launch a series of ‘Positive Hong Kong’ products for RWB 330. Denim flowers are made by the service users of Salvation Army Shaukiwan Day Activity Centre. They are named “Spend Our Youth As Much As We Want” Denim Flowers for being meaningful to spend time making.

Service users of St. James' Settlement (Hong Kong) Rehabilitation Service Centre embroider the decorated words from HKDI’s students with different stitching patterns on cup mats. The word on embroidery cup mat transmits cheering messages. For instance, several cup mats can combine to be ‘Able to endure’. The ‘I support you’ Cup Mat series encourages people to resist adversity and achieve success with perseverance and determination.

=== Lo Yip Nang ===
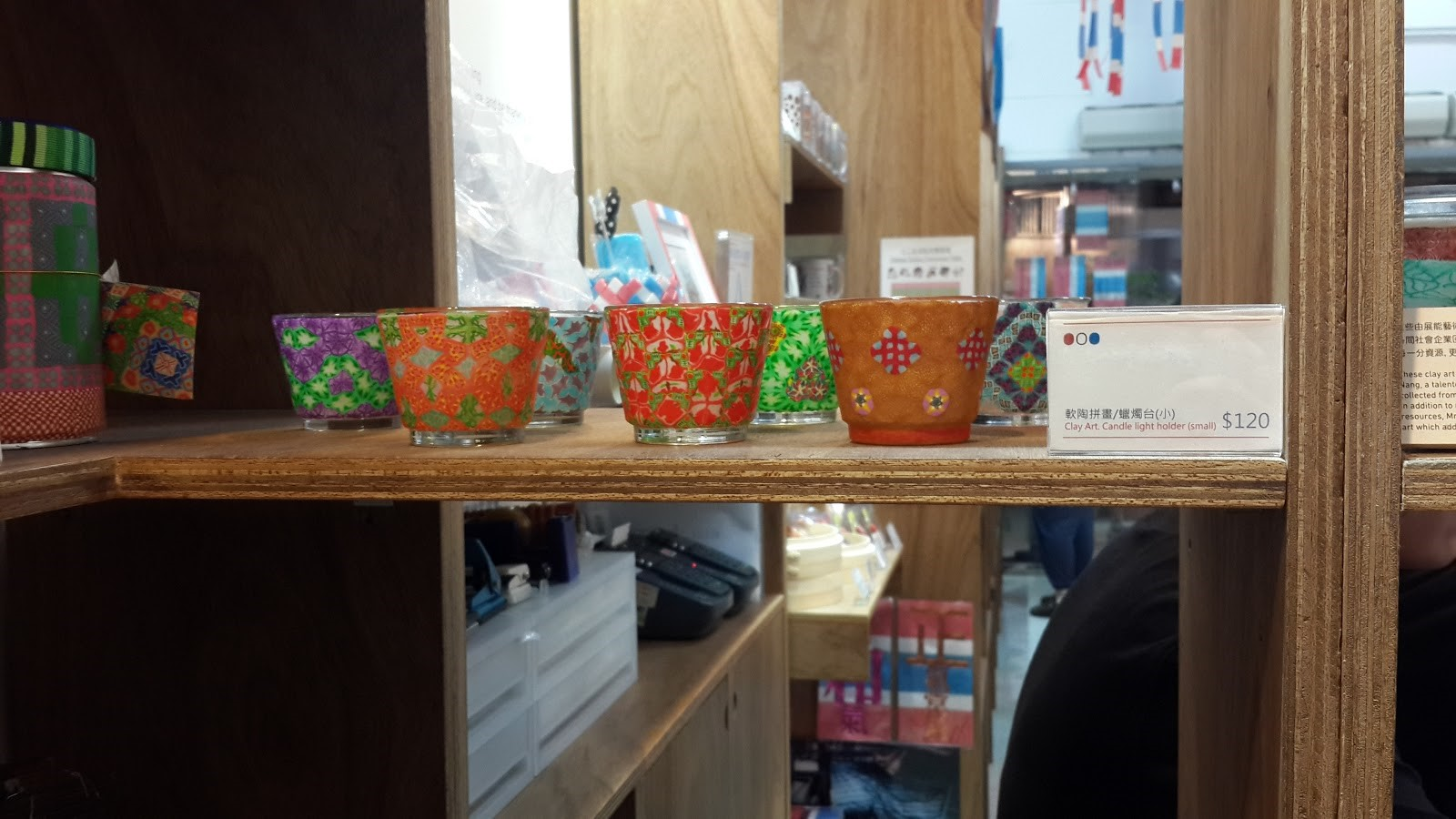
Clay made by Lo Yip Nang

Lo Yip Nang, an autistic local artist, sells his clay art products in RWB 330. There are clay strips with different colours and patterns pasted on the art pieces.

== Creative Workshops ==
RWB 330 organizes creative workshops that charge different tuition fees. There are four major categories of the workshops: skincare, personal care, planting and balloon modelling. The skincare and personal care workshops teach participants to make products like soap and shampoo by themselves. The planting classes educate knowledge about gardening. The balloon modelling workshop enables learners to possess one of the venue decoration skills. Most of the classes target on those who age 10 or above.
