= A Kung Ngam (constituency) =

Hong Kong constituency

- Elected constituency for the Eastern District Council
- Boundary of A Kung Ngam in Eastern District
- District: Eastern
- Legislative Council constituency: Hong Kong Island East
- Population: 18,823 (2019)
- Electorate: 11,482 (2019)

Current constituency
- Created: 1994
- Number of members: One
- Member: Vacant

A Kung Ngam (Chinese: 阿公岩) is one of the 35 constituencies in the Eastern District. The constituency returns one district councillor to the Eastern District Council, with an election every four years.

A Kung Ngam has estimated population of 18,823.

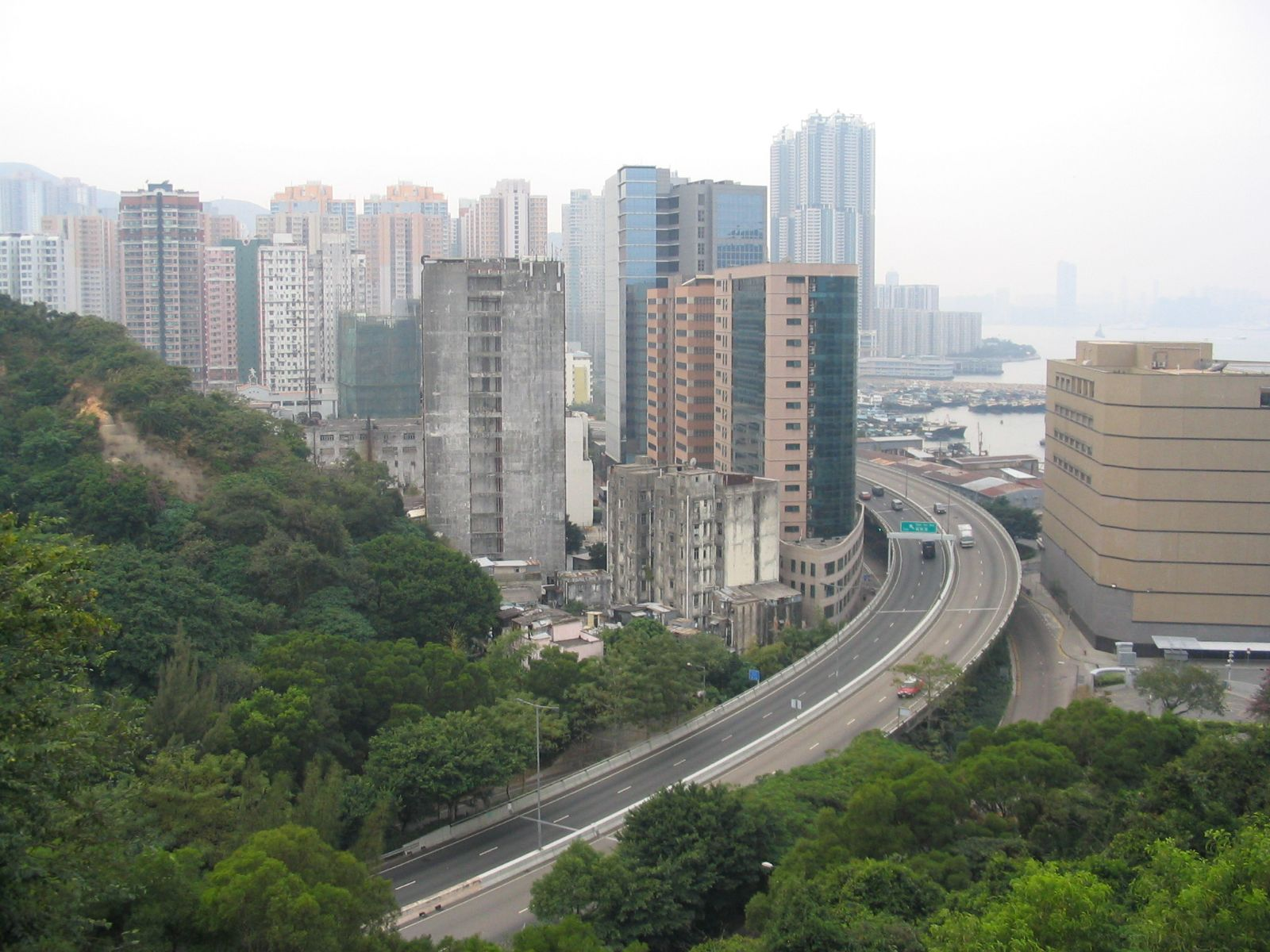
Island Eastern Corridor in A Kung Ngam in December 2005

== Councillors represented ==
Election	Member	Party	%
1994	Daniel To Boon-man	Independent	68.12
1999	Daniel To Boon-man	Independent	57.46
2003	Daniel To Boon-man	Independent	N/A
2007	Daniel To Boon-man	Independent	73.70
2011	Daniel To Boon-man	Independent	44.77
2015	George Lam Kei-tung	Independent	39.19
2019	Kwok Chi-chung→Vacant (Note: Resigned on 9 July 2021.)	SKWEF	52.71

== Election results ==
=== 2010s ===
Eastern District Council Election, 2019: A Kung Ngam
Party	Candidate	Votes	%	±%
SKWEF	Kwok Chi-chung	4,204	52.71	
Independent	George Lam Kei-tung	3,174	39.80	−0.61
Nonpartisan	Eugene Chan Yat-him	597	7.49	
Majority		1,030	12.91	
Turnout		7,989	69.59	
SKWEF gain from Independent		Swing		

Eastern District Council Election, 2015: A Kung Ngam
Party	Candidate	Votes	%	±%
Independent	George Lam Kei-tung	1,810	39.19	+7.44
Independent	Daniel To Boon-man	1,696	36.73	−8.04
DAB	Hung Chi-kit	1,112	24.08	
Majority		114	2.46	
Turnout		4,618	42.12	
Independent gain from Independent		Swing	+7.74	

Eastern District Council Election, 2011: A Kung Ngam
Party	Candidate	Votes	%	±%
Independent	Daniel To Boon-man	1,692	44.77	−28.93
Independent	George Lam Kei-tung	1,200	31.75	
Independent	Cheng Hing	887	23.47	−2.83
Majority		492	13.22	
Turnout		3,779	31.15	
Independent hold		Swing		

=== 2000s ===
Eastern District Council Election, 2007: A Kung Ngam
Party	Candidate	Votes	%	±%
Independent	Daniel To Boon-man	1,505	73.70	
Independent	Cheng Hing	537	26.30	
Majority		968	47.40	
Independent hold		Swing		

Eastern District Council Election, 2003: A Kung Ngam
Party	Candidate	Votes	%	±%
Independent	Daniel To Boon-man	uncontested		
Independent hold		Swing		

=== 1990s ===
Eastern District Council Election, 1999: A Kung Ngam
Party	Candidate	Votes	%	±%
Independent	Daniel To Boon-man	1,703	57.46	−10.66
DAB	Cheung Kwai-foon	901	31.88	−1.48
Independent	Chan Tat-man	360	12.15	
Majority		802	25.58	
Independent hold		Swing		

Eastern District Board Election, 1994: A Kung Ngam
Party	Candidate	Votes	%	±%
Independent	Daniel To Boon-man	1,549	68.12	
DAB	Lau Cheung Kwai-foon	725	31.88	
Majority		824	36.24	
Independent win (new seat)				
