= Hong Kong Secondary Students Union =

Organization in Hong Kong, China

The Hong Kong Secondary Students Union (Chinese characters: 香港中學生聯盟) is a pro-democracy student organisation in Hong Kong established in August 2003 by some pro-democratic secondary school students of Hong Kong. Formed by various students' associations (SA's) and students' councils (SC's) of secondary schools, it is the third largest politically involved youth organisation in Hong Kong, after the Hong Kong Federation of Students and the Hong Kong Youth and Tertiary Students Association.

The HKSSU's stated goals are to study social and political issues from a student's perspective, to speak out on government policies affecting secondary school students, and to raise awareness and sense of responsibility among young people towards social and political issues. Activities include the annual Youth Conference in Hong Kong, as well as participation in various political demonstrations.

Advisors to the HKSSU include four barristers, one solicitor, twelve university professors and lecturers, two clergy, one reporter, one accountant, and two doctors.

== Political activism ==
Secondary school students in Hong Kong were traditionally perceived as being indifferent to politics, until an ad hoc group of secondary students (中學生關注基本法第23條立法聯盟) called about 3000 students to take part in the political demonstration in 2003 against Article 23 of Hong Kong's Basic Law, after noticing heated discussions among students about the proposed legislation. After the demonstration, the ad hoc group reorganised itself and became a registered organisation under the name Hong Kong Secondary Students Union.

=== Political demonstrations ===
HKSSU has been active in many political demonstrations since its inception, including:

- the pro-democracy demonstration demanding universal suffrage in 2007 and 2008 on New Year's Day, 1 January 2004;
- the demonstration against the interpretation of Basic Law by the Standing Committee of the National People's Congress on 11 April 2004;
- the pro-democracy demonstration demanding universal suffrage in 2007 and 2008 on 1 July 2004;
- the pro-democracy demonstration demanding universal suffrage in 2007 and 2008 on 23 January 2005;
- the demonstration on 17 April 2005 against the history revisionism in Japanese textbooks;
- the demonstration against the interpretation of Basic Law by the Standing Committee of the National People's Congress on 24 April 2005;
- the rally on 31 May 2005 commemorating the Tiananmen Square protests of 1989;
- the pro-democracy demonstration demanding universal suffrage on 2007 and 2008 on 1 July 2005;
- the pro-democracy demonstration demanding a timetable of democratisation on 4 December 2005 and
- 18 March 2007 protest.

Despite HKSSU's success to mobilise a large number of students in the first 1 July Rally in 2003, it seemed unable to call such a great number of students to join later demonstrations, and people who marched in the name of the union were mostly either members of the executive committee or core members. Many teenagers did participate in the demonstrations, but they did not follow the union.

Nevertheless, HKSSU did participate in most of the protests organised by the pro-democracy camp, including as the anti–Tiananmen massacre protests, not only for expressing the students' voice, but also for raising funds to keep the union running.

=== Other political involvements ===
Besides participating in political demonstrations, the HKSSU has also been active in other political activities, including

- participating in various public discussion forums; and
- organising and participating in promotional events to encourage voter turnout.

== Other activities ==
The HKSSU was also involved in other activities, including conducting a survey among secondary school students on educational issues (funding cuts in particular) in December 2003; and the issue of various position papers on mostly educational policies.

On 1 January 2005, they joined a donation campaign raised by the pro-democracy camp, raising funds for people affected by tsunami of South Asia. They established counters in Mong Kok and Causeway Bay, and successfully raised more than $70000.

Besides, they also organise the Youth Conference every year.

== Youth Conference ==
The Youth Conference is held annually by HKSSU in Hong Kong.

=== Youth Conference 2004 ===
YC 2004 was co-organized by the HKSSU, Hong Kong Human Rights Monitor (HKHRM) and Hong Kong Democratic Development Network (HKDDN), with the purpose of:

- training for critical thinking, debating and communicating skills,
- agglomerating the united power of youths,
- making youths more concerned about public affairs,
- learning about the Hong Kong Children's Council.

For the organising committees, many walk-in teenagers, as well as some Executive Committees of the union who were F.5 or F.7. The director of this year was Kitty Ng, the chairlady of HKSSU.

More than 160 students from different schools applied for attending this conference, and 85 of them were chosen to participate in the activity. A pre-camp workshop was held on 21 July 2004 in Esther Lee Building of the Chinese University of Hong Kong. A 5-day camp was held on 25 July – 29 July 2004, at Shaw College and a mock debate was held in Legco.

=== Youth Conference 2005 ===
This year, the focus was put on the theme of ""Democratic School", together with some concepts about children rights. It was jointly organised by HKSSU, HKHRM, and Hong Kong Democratic Development Network (HKDDN).

The organising committees were mainly filled by some non-EXCO Members of HKSSU, together with staff of HKHRM and HKDDN. The directors of Youth Conference 2005 were Ian Leung of HKSSU, Kit Chan of HKHRM and Chris Lo of HKDDN.

A 4-day camp was held on 1 August – 4 August 2005, at Chung Chi College of CUHK. A post-camp workshop was held the City University of Hong Kong on 13 August and the mock debate was held in Legco on 20 August.

=== Youth Conference 2006 ===
The executive committee decided to organise another Youth Conference this summer, with the theme of "unequal distribution of wealth". It was jointly organised by HKSSU, HKHRM, and Hong Kong Democratic Development Network (HKDDN).

The organising committees were mainly filled by some non-EXCO Members & EXCO Members of HKSSU, together with staff of HKHRM and HKDDN. The chairpersons of Youth Conference 2006 were Ben Chung Kam Lun of HKSSU, Valerie Chan Wing Yin of HKHRM .

A 4-day camp was held on 24 July – 27 July 2006, at uc United College of CUHK. A workshop was held on 12 August 2006 at the HKPTU headquarters and a mock debate.

== Controversies ==
=== Independence ===
The union claims to be independent in finance and the administration, and is not sponsored by any political parties. However Human Rights Monitor (hereafter short-termed as HRM) and the Democratic Development Network (hereafter short-termed as DDN) were just too close to the top-profile members of the Union. In 2005, the two factions supporting HRM and DDN respectively started a destructive power struggle, which in fact pushed the Social Democrats to power. The HRM and Social Democratic alliance remained in power until the conservatives took power in November 2006.

The Human Rights Monitor is being accused by conservatives and Social Democrats to be "too involved" in union affairs. Even for the liberals, some former executive committee members were quoted to have said that the union would eventually become a puppet of HRM if the Union could not maintain its independence.

Since the conservatives took power, co-operation and communication between HRM and the Union became more or less symbolic. Mistrust and discontent rose between both organisations.

=== Factional Problems ===
The union faced with serious factional problems, with two major power struggles since its establishment in 2003. Factional problems hindered the future development of the Union.

== See also ==
- Legislation for Article 23 controversies
- Japanese history textbook controversies
