= Outward Processing Arrangement =

Law in China and Hong Kong affecting the textile industry

The Outward Processing Arrangement (OPA) concerns the textile industry in Hong Kong and the People's Republic of China. It states that Hong Kong manufacturers can subcontract subsidiary and finishing processes to mainland factories, as long as the "major transformation" of the garment takes place in Hong Kong. Major transformation, however, only needs to amount to 10% of total cloth processing. Any products exported to China for outward processing must be reimported to Hong Kong within 2 months. Effective from 10 June 2005, Hong Kong manufacturers can apply to the Trade and Industry Department of Hong Kong for exemption of export duty in association with the processed garments as they are being exported from China.

The arrangement allow companies in Hong Kong to manufacture and export textile products from China to rest of the world without being subjected to quota and tariff imposed by other countries against China.
