= Justice Union =

Justice Union (Chinese: 公義同盟) is a small political group in the Hong Kong Special Administrative Region of the People's Republic of China.

It was established and chaired by Angel Leung, former DJ and then Eastern District Councillor, after leaving the Democratic Party.

Three members of the group ran in the 2003 District Council election in the Chai Wan area in the Eastern District, and Leung herself ran in a constituency in Ma On Shan of the Sha Tin District. All were defeated.

== See also ==
- Democratic Party
