= Six States Installation of Minister murder =

1950s Hong Kong murder case

- Year: 5 November 1951
- Address: 359 Lockhart Road, Wan Chai, Hong Kong
- Casualties: 3 dead, 3 injured

The "Six States Installation of Minister" murder case (Chinese: 六國大封相兇殺案) was a dramatic murder case that occurred in Hong Kong during the 1950s. The case was considered to be one of the most serious murder cases at the time, and was sensationalised by the media.

== Etymology ==
The name of this murder case was derived from a Cantonese opera "Six States Installation of Minister" (六國大封相), an opera set in the Seven Warring States period. Just before the murder, the murderer told his sister-in-law that he is about to do a rendition of the opera, and start killing

Despite the murder itself had been forgotten, the phrase "Six States Installation of Minister" (六國大封相) has, in the decades since, entered popular vocabulary in Hong Kong to describe a chaotic, fierce argument or conflict.

== Background ==
=== Exile to Hong Kong ===
When the People's Republic of China was formed in 1949, Nationalist military officer Chu Shing-choi (朱盛材) escaped China to Hong Kong to rendezvous with his brother, Zhu Xingcai (朱醒材). Zhu Xingcai was a merchant, and was in the United States at the time. As a result, Chu Shing-choi stayed at his brother's residence.

During those times, it is common for flatowners in Hong Kong to sublet individual rooms to other people. So, Chu was, in fact, living with numerous other families:

1. Zhu Xingcai, his wife Kwan Yuet-ngo (關月娥) and their son.
2. The sister of Guan Yue-E, Guan Yue Mei (關月美), her husband Wang Ji Soeng (黃子驤), and their three children.
3. The brother of Guan Yue-E, Guan Hong Sang (關鴻生), his wife Chan Chiu (陳肖).
4. Maid Wong Mei (黃美)
5. Widow Wu Sam Gu (吳三姑)
6. The sister of Wang Zi Xiang, Wang Yi Man (黃綺文)

=== Tension ===
When Chu Shing-choi came to Hong Kong, he brought with him a small fortune that is sufficient for him to start a small business. However, Chu blew through his savings within a year, and began to borrow money from his sister-in-law. It was at this time that Chu's sister-in-law began to insult and belittle him. In addition, Chu's relation with the widow Wu San Gu, which was seen by Chu's sister-in-law as endearing, also drew fierce criticism, and this also caused Wu San Gu to leave the residence.

In actuality, Chu Shing-choi liked Wang Qi Wen, and he moved with her to Shek Kip Mei to escape from his sister-in-law's insult.

=== Preparations for murder ===
During one fierce argument, Chu threatened to eventually deliver a rendition of "Six States Installation of Minister", but this did not deter Guan Yue-E, and even drove her children and the maid to go against Chu. In the meantime, Chu bought a butcher's knife and some petrol in preparations for murder.

== Murder ==
On 5 November 1951, Chu Shing-choi went back to his former residence at No. 359 Lockhart Road to collect his properties. At this time, three women denounced him for taking up valuable space in the house, and an argument ensued. Chu then immediately went into the kitchen, took out the butcher's knife, and locked the main doors to the house.

Before he assaulted his sister-in-law, Chu Shing-choi said "You wanted see my rendition of "Six States Installation of Minister", did you? I have been prepared a long time ago, and I already bought this knife for a month now. I will kill all today!" (Chinese: 你們不是渴望看我的《六國大封相》嗎？我早已準備好，這把刀也給你們買下個多月了，今天我就要大開殺戒！)

After that speech, Chu struck his sister-in-law with the butcher's knife. She was struck in the head and both arms. As Guan Yue-E rushed out of the house for help, Chu rushed into Guan Yue-E's room, and killed Wong Siu-lun, Yue-E's three-year-old daughter. Chan Chiu also tried to escape, but failed, and was murdered as well. As for the maid, Wong Mei, she was seriously injured.

After the murder, Chu took out the can of petrol he bought earlier, and poured it around the apartment and set it on fire. While escaping, Chu encounted Wang Zi-Xiang's son of age four, named Wong Shiu-young. Zhu grabbed the young Wong and threw him out from the 4th floor apartment, resulting in heavy injury for the boy. Despite the fact that a crowd had gathered, Wong wasn't stopped by the crowd due to believing he was merely escaping the fire.

=== Casualties ===
- Murdered: 3; Chen Chiu, Guan Yue-E, and Wong Siu-lun
- Injured: 3; Guan Yue Mei, Wong Mei, and Wang Zi-Xiang's son Wong Shiu-young

The other renters were not in flats at the time.

== Arrest and trial ==
Due to the damages and casualties, the murder attract much sensations among Hong Kong news media, while the police had set up blockades to prevent him leaving Hong Kong.

On 8 November 1951, at 6:50 am, Chu surrendered to the police at Central Police Station. During body search, it was discovered that he only had one Hong Kong dime, three handkerchiefs, and a letter addressed to the police and news media.

In the letter, Chu laid out the motive and incident of the murder, as well as expressing his displeasure of the motive guessed by the news media, which wrongly reported his motive was due to failure to borrow money. In it, he stated that due to cynicism and scoldings from the women in the flat, he had planned to burn down the house and do nothing else; the murder was incidental caused by the women in their attempt to prevent the arson. He also stated that he greatly hated Guan Yue Mei, who had chased Wang Qi Wen away from him. He further confessed that he had planned to kill himself by jumping out of the flat's window, but due to the gathering crowd on the street he chose escape instead. He had attempted to hide with his girlfriend and friends, but due to the heavy reporting, none of them was willing to hide him, and thus he chose to surrender to the police.

The court decided to try Chu only on one count, of the murder of Chen Xiao; it was common for the then-Hong Kong Judicial branch to focus on trying the most hindeous crime in order to minimise usage of Judicial resources, since if he was guilty on the charge of premeditated murder, he would be given death penalty. During the Trial, the defence attempted to use insanity caused by provocation, but prosecutor pointed out that the psychiatric reports showed the accused does not have any mental issues; furthermore, prior to the murder, the accused had prepared the instruments of murder, and had purposely locked the door, which showed that it was a deliberate, planned crime, and that the accused was not insane nor diminish during the moment of murder. Due to this, the jury delivered a guilty verdict to Zhu Sheng Cai on one count of murder, and was sentenced to be hanged on 23 May 1952.
