= Tai Nam Wan =

Former bay in Tsing Yi, Hong Kong

Coordinates: 22.3320°N 114.1002°E

Tai Nam Wan (Chinese: 大南灣), or Nam Wan (南環, correctly 南灣) was a bay on the south coast of Tsing Yi Island, Hong Kong. The bay was reclaimed for Tsing Yi Power Station operated by China Light and Power. As there is another south bay, Nam Wan (南灣), near Sai Tso Wan to the west of the island, some people refer to this bigger one as big south bay. The Chinese name Nam Wan (南環) is a mistaken form of Nam Wan (南灣). The two characters for Wan in Cantonese are pronounced identically except for the tone.

== Location ==
The bay is south of Tsing Yi Peak, the highest point on the island, between Nam Wan Kok and Ng Tsang Lau and faces the west water of Victoria Harbour. The harbour is an anchorage for cargo vessels from around the world.

The reclaimed area remains separated from the island of Tsing Yi by drainage channels on three sides, making the area an artificial island.

== Buildings ==
The bay was completely reclaimed for Tsing Yi Power Station and the shoreline straightened. The power station was built in the 1960s and has since been demolished. A smaller station Tsing Yi Gas Turbine Power Station was built in its place. An Esso oil depot occupies part of the reclamation.
