= Hong Kong High End Audio Visual Show =

The Hong Kong High End Audio Visual Show (香港高級視聽展) is an annual exhibition held at the Hong Kong Convention and Exhibition Centre for audio-visual companies to showcase their electronics and products.

== Feature ==
Audio and visual brands from Europe, the United States, Japan, Hong Kong and Mainland China, exhibit their latest products at the show. Exhibits including CD, SACD, DVD & LP's, as well as audiophile accessories including cables & tuning devices, are displayed and sold.
