= Hoi Ha Wan =

Bay in a marine park in Hong Kong

Coordinates: 22°28′10″N 114°20′08″E

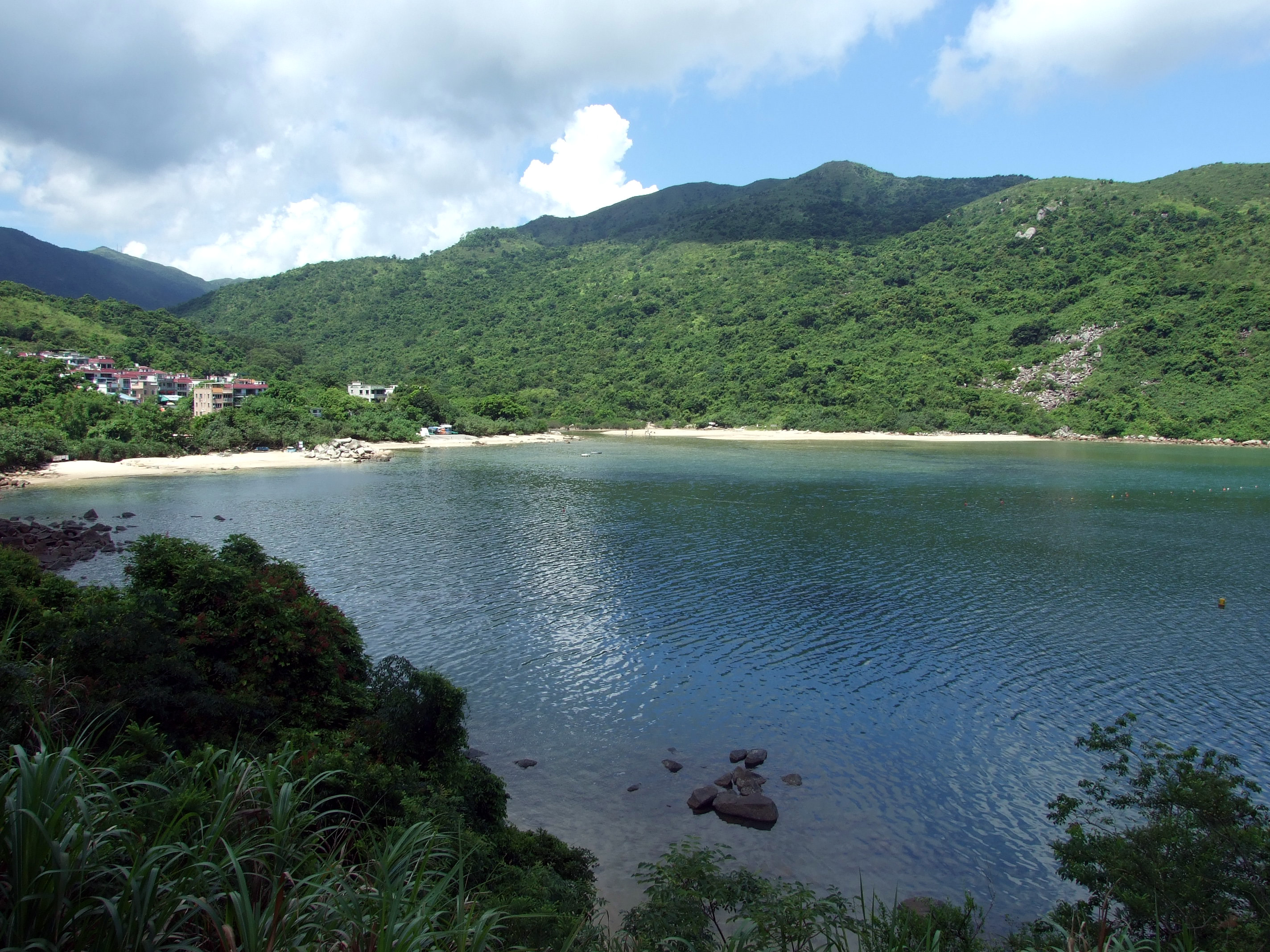
Hoi Ha Wan.

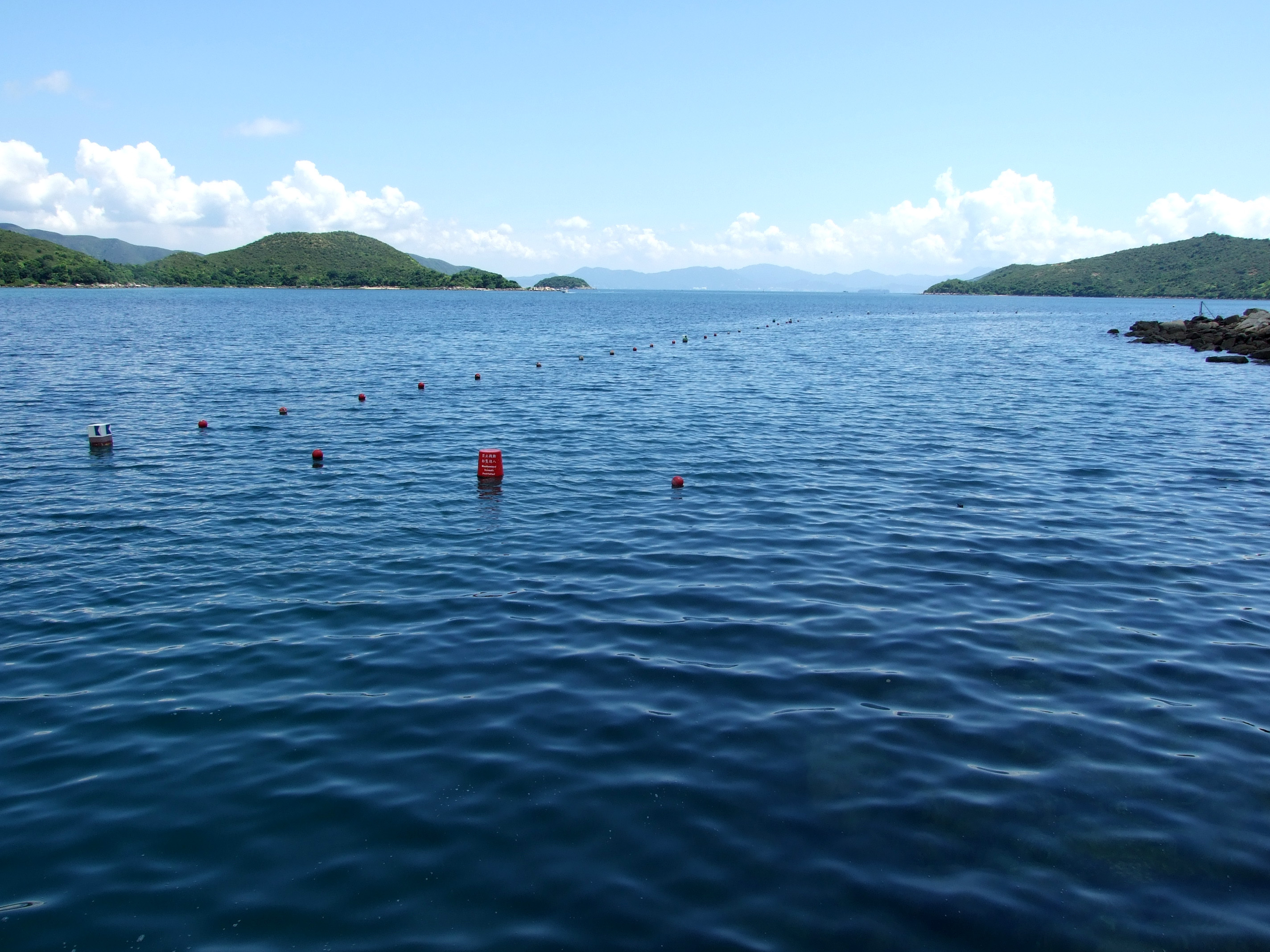
Hoi Ha Wan.

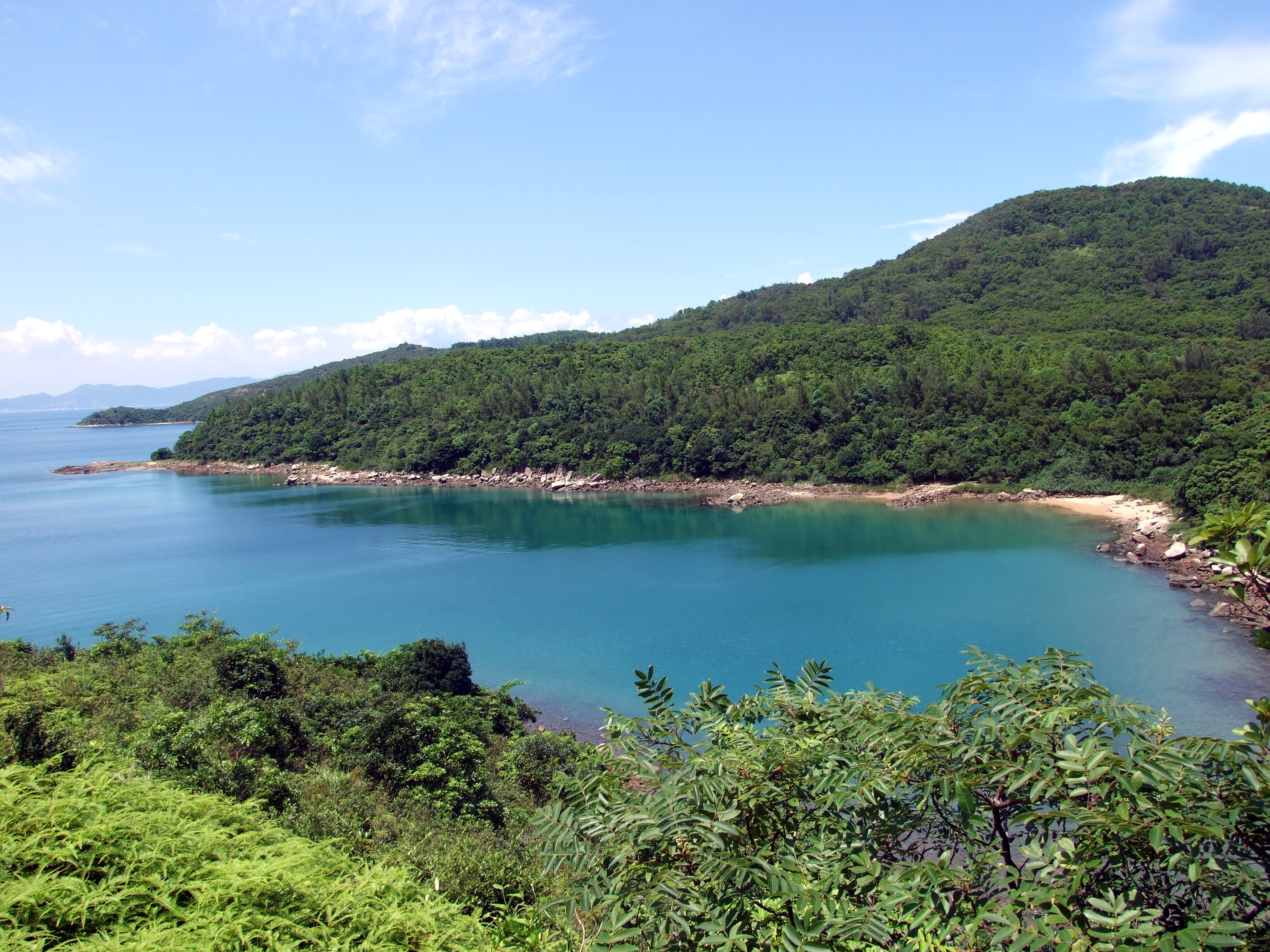
Wan Tsai peninsula bordering Hoi Ha Wan.

Hoi Ha Wan (Chinese: 海下灣) or Jone's Cove is a bay at the north of Sai Kung Peninsula. It is part of Hoi Ha Wan Marine Park, a marine park in Hong Kong. The village of Hoi Ha is located on the innermost shore of Hoi Ha Wan.

The location has a high biological value, as it shows significant biodiversity. That is because the Park is a sheltered bay with pristine water quality, so that it provides a good marine environment for housing a great variety of marine organisms. Numerous kinds of corals can be ascertained under the sea, and it is a hot spot for diving. So as to keep the local ecosystems away from human intervention, fishing, particularly bottom trawling and uses of dynamites or poisons like cyanides, collecting sea products and corals are prohibited by law.

== Geography ==
Covering an area of around 2.6 square kilometres (1.0 sq mi), the seaward boundary of the park is demarcated by linking the tips of Heung Lo Kok and Kwun Tsoi Kok through the northern end of Flat Island (Ngan Chau) and Moon Island (Mo Chau). The landward boundary follows the high-water mark along the coastline. The Wan Tsai peninsula forms the western seashore of Hoi Ha Wan.

== Ecology ==
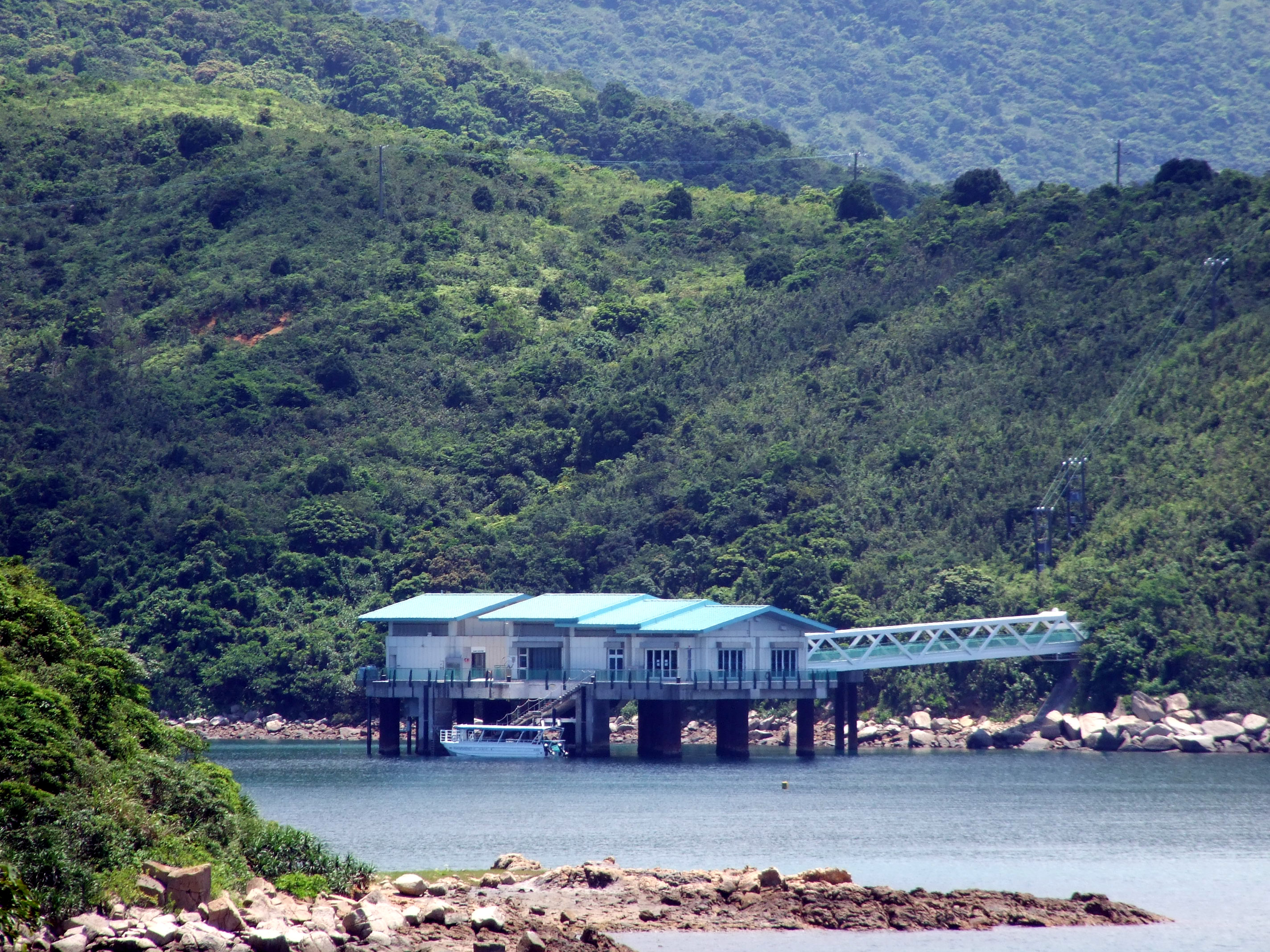
Jockey Club HSBC WWF Hong Kong Hoi Ha Marine Life Centre in Hoi Ha Wan.

=== Mangrove communities ===
Like the nursery grounds in Mai Po, Hoi Ha Wan also offers a mangrove community occupying about 5,300 square metres (57,000 sq ft). Along with a buffer zone between the tidal waters and the land, the mangrove woods are commonly act an ecologically sustainable habitat for juvenile fishes and other intertidal and subtidal invertebrates.

=== Marine communities ===
Hoi Ha Wan Marine Park has lush coral communities. Most of the stony coral species recorded in Hong Kong can be found in this marine park. 100-odd species of reef-associated fishes have been recorded in Hoi Ha Wan. In addition, records of wide variety of marine animals, like starfish and jellyfish, in the Park further demonstrates its ecological significance.

Reef Check through AFCD performed by local British Sub-Aqua Club diving enthusiasts 'Ydive' , and Li Po Chun United World College's Coral Monitoring Team has annually monitored coral & marine life variety & density since 1992.

=== World Wildlife Fund Marine Life Centre ===
The Jockey Club HSBC WWF Hong Kong Hoi Ha Marine Life Centre is based in the marine park and offers students and the community opportunities to appreciate Hong Kong's valuable marine resources. To increase public understanding and participation in biodiversity monitoring WWF Hong Kong have been increasingly getting involved in Citizen Science, incorporating iNaturalist and the City Nature Challenge activities into their sites across Hong Kong including Hoi Ha Wan.

== History ==
There are also the remnants of limekilns. There are total of four lime kilns in Hoi Ha Wan but only two remain comparatively intact. They are located on the eastern shore of inner Hoi Ha Wan. The lime kiln industry was one of the oldest industries (1800–1939) in Hong Kong, which refined lime from either oyster shells or coral skeletons for construction and agricultural uses. In the processes, limestone, i.e. calcium carbonate, in the shells and corals would be transformed into calcium oxide by means of heating.

== Transport ==
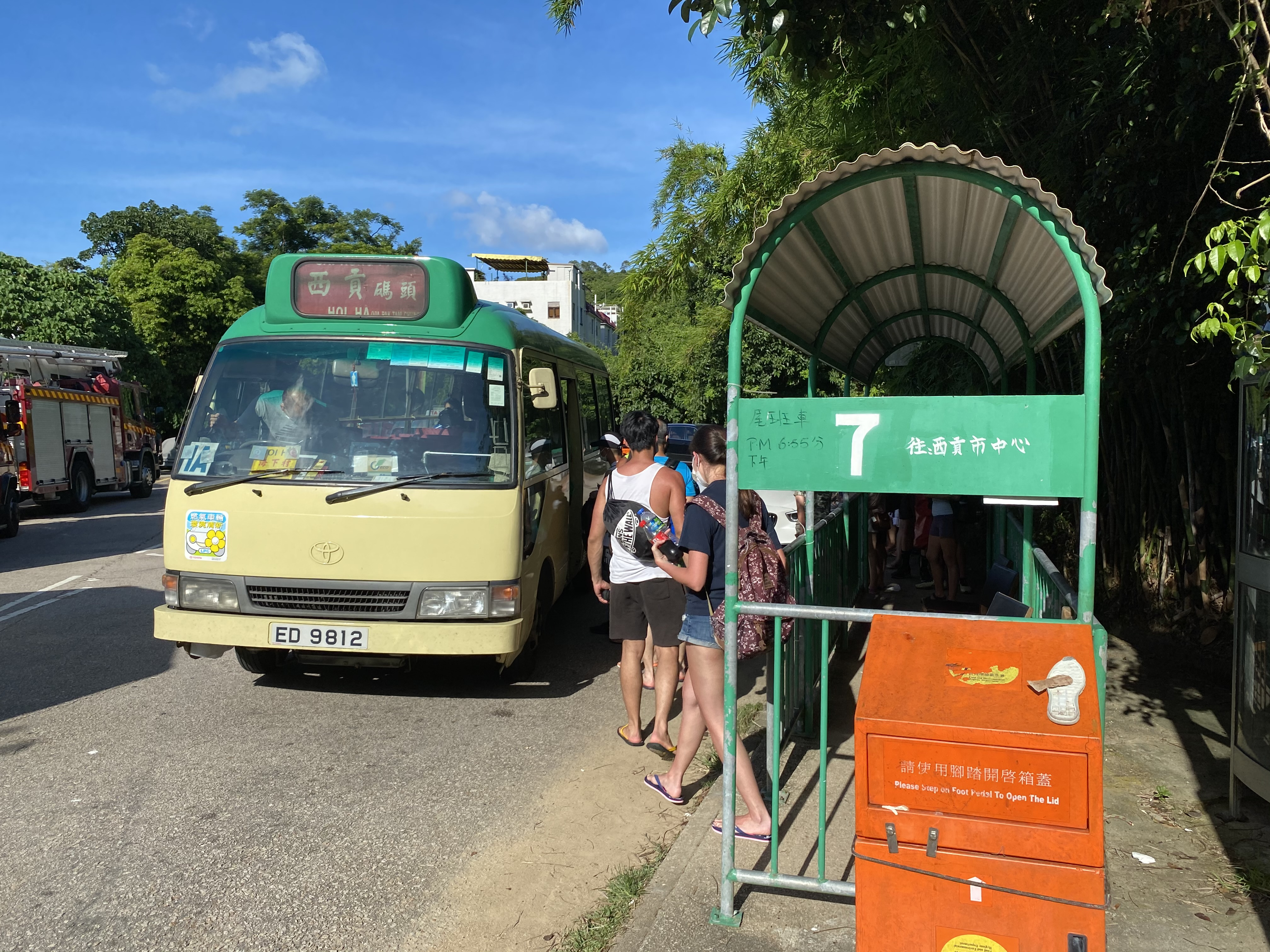
Green Minibus stop at Hoi Ha.

Hoi Ha Wan can be reached by taking the New Territories Green Minibus route number 7 at Sai Kung Town Centre. The minibus provides service at daytime every day, every 30 minutes. The first bus leaves from Sai Kung at 7:55 am, from the bus stop outside the 7-11 convenience store by the pier. The last bus departs from Sai Kung from the same location at 6:25 pm. The fare from Sai Kung Town to Hoi Ha Wan is HK$13.1 as of June 2020.

== See also ==
- Marine parks in Hong Kong
