= Parks in Hong Kong =

Parks in Hong Kong may refer to:

- Conservation in Hong Kong (which covers country parks and special areas)
- Marine parks in Hong Kong
- Urban public parks and gardens in Hong Kong
