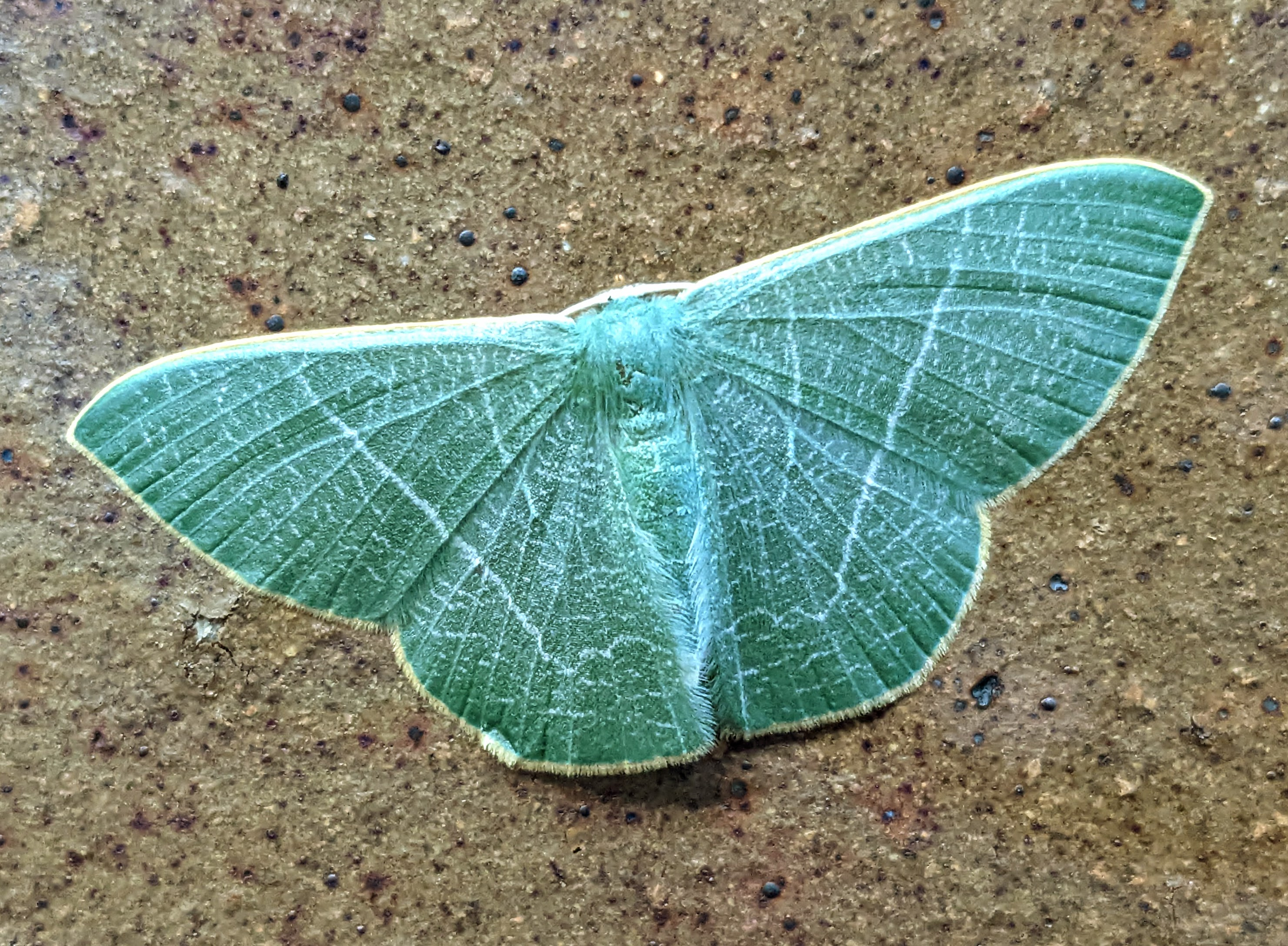
- Thalassodes intaminata, Sasebo Japan

Scientific classification
- Domain: Eukaryota
- Kingdom: Animalia
- Phylum: Arthropoda
- Class: Insecta
- Order: Lepidoptera
- Family: Geometridae
- Genus: Thalassodes
- Species: T. intaminata

Binomial name
- Thalassodes intaminata Inoue, 1971

= Thalassodes intaminata =

Species of moth

Thalassodes intaminata is a species of moth in the family Geometridae, sometimes called emerald moths. It is found in Fujian China, Taiwan, Japan, Thailand, Philippines, and Indonesia (Sumatra). Until recently (2005) this species was classified as a subspecies of Thalassodes immissaria but has been upgraded to a distinct species. It is however very similar in appearance and distribution to T. immissaria, but can be distinguished by differences in male and female genitalia.

== Description ==
The wingspan of this species is 30mm. As with most members of the genera Thalassodes, T. intaminata has wings that are sea-green in color and semi-transparent. Wings also exhibit very narrow, white, transverse lines. The antenna of males are usually bipectinate (comb-like) for 3/4 of the length, and filamentous at the end. Female antennae are entirely filamentous.
