= WWF Hong Kong =

Environmental organization

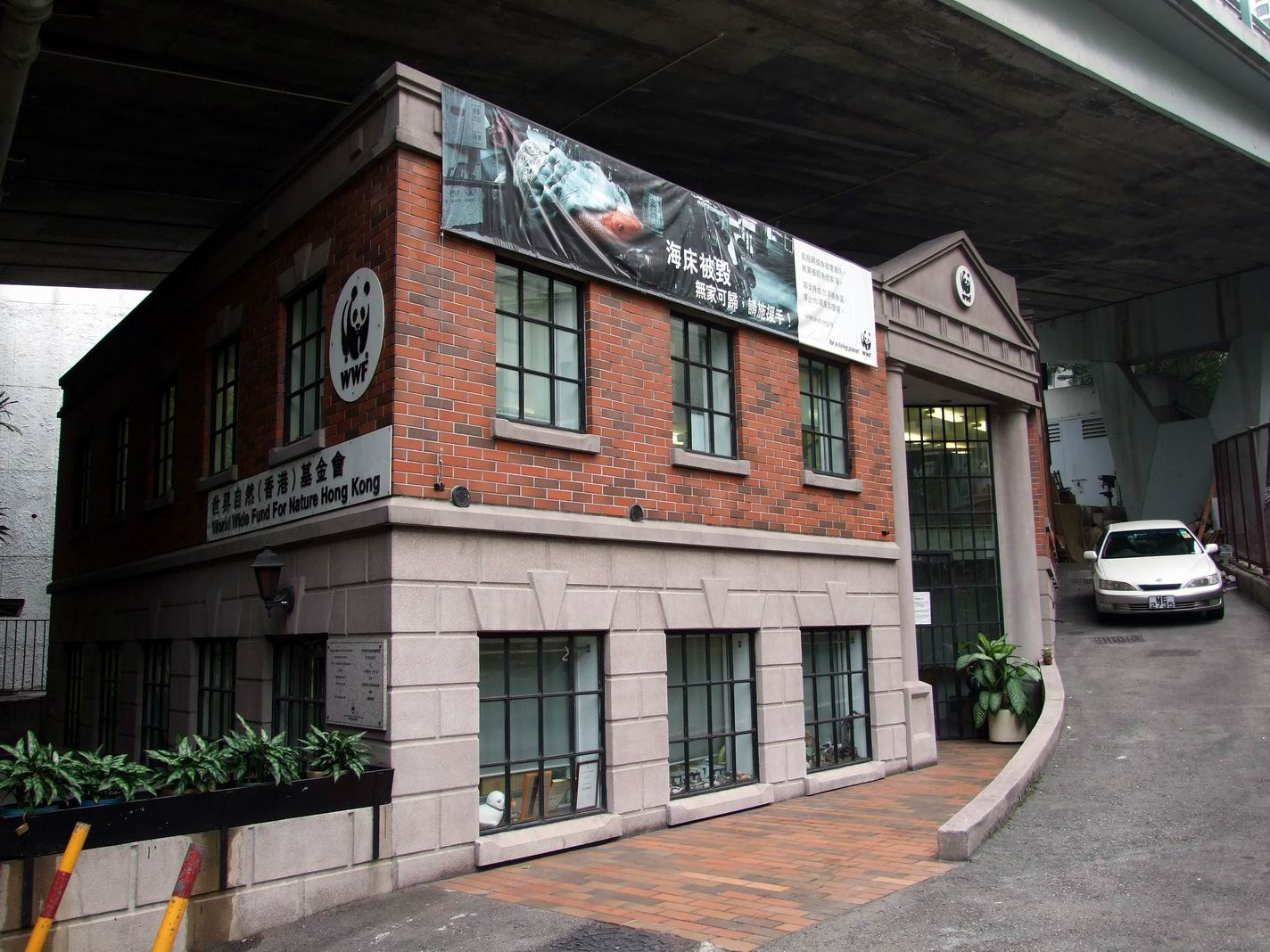
WWF Hong Kong Central Visitor Centre.

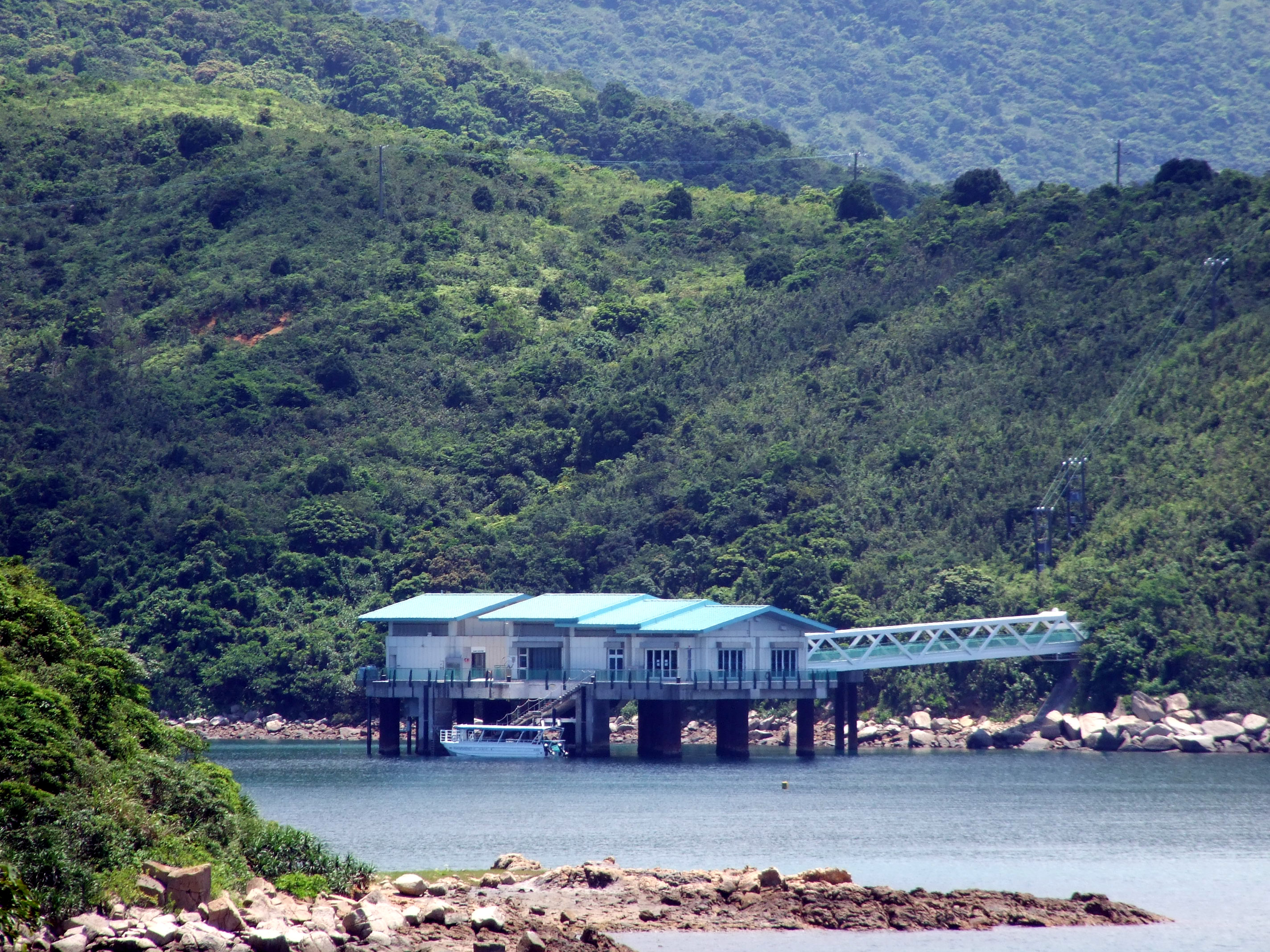
Jockey Club HSBC WWF Hong Kong Hoi Ha Marine Life Centre.

WWF Hong Kong (WWF HK) is the independent branch of the World Wide Fund for Nature in Hong Kong. It was established in December 1981 as World Wildlife Fund Hong Kong.

WWF Hong Kong has over 150 full-time staff for conservation impact and a new deal for nature and people. Visitors are welcome at some five centres located Central 1, Tramway path, Island House Tai Po, Mai Po, and Hoi Ha Wan.

In the city visitors can interact and participate in activities at the sustainability hub at 1, Tramway Path At Mai Po nature reserve visitors can meet the WWF Hong Kong research team under Dr Carmen Or who is carrying out citizen science activities and biodiversity research across Hong Kong, such as the Camera trap mammal and firefly surveys to map more than 2050+ species across the Mai Po Marshes nature reserve. The surveys have also incorporated citizen science participation, and using this approach to further monitor biodiversity across Hong Kong, WWF have incorporated iNaturalist and the City Nature Challenge into activities at their Mai Po and Hoi Ha Wan centres. Other Citizen Science activities they’ve helped coordinate in Hong Kong include the ecological survey and impact of clam digging in Shui Hau Lantau and looking at the need for a no take zone and protection for the horseshoe crab breeding on the mudflats. The no plastics in nature campaign and coastal clean-up and surveying of marine litter programme called Coastal Watch has now evolved to looking at the impact of Ghost Gear abandoned by fishermen and arranging to remove and recycle these plastic nets
