= Island House, Hong Kong =

Historical building in Hong Kong

Coordinates: 22.44596°N 114.17885°E

- Traditional Chinese: 舊政務司官邸
Transcriptions
Yue: Cantonese
- Yale Romanization: Gauh jing mouh sī gūn dái
- Jyutping: Gau6 zing3 mou6 si1 gun1 dai2

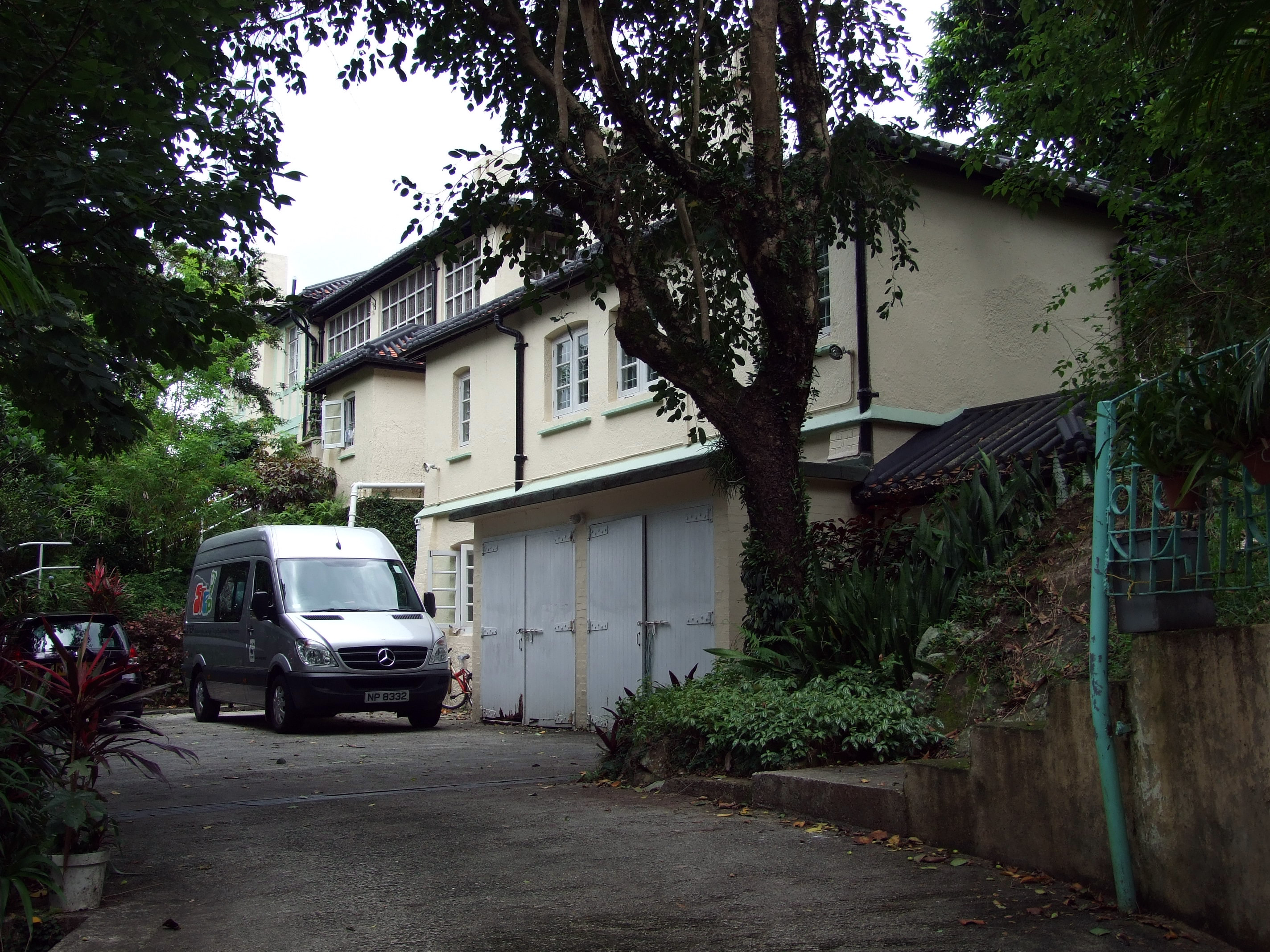
Island House in June 2010.

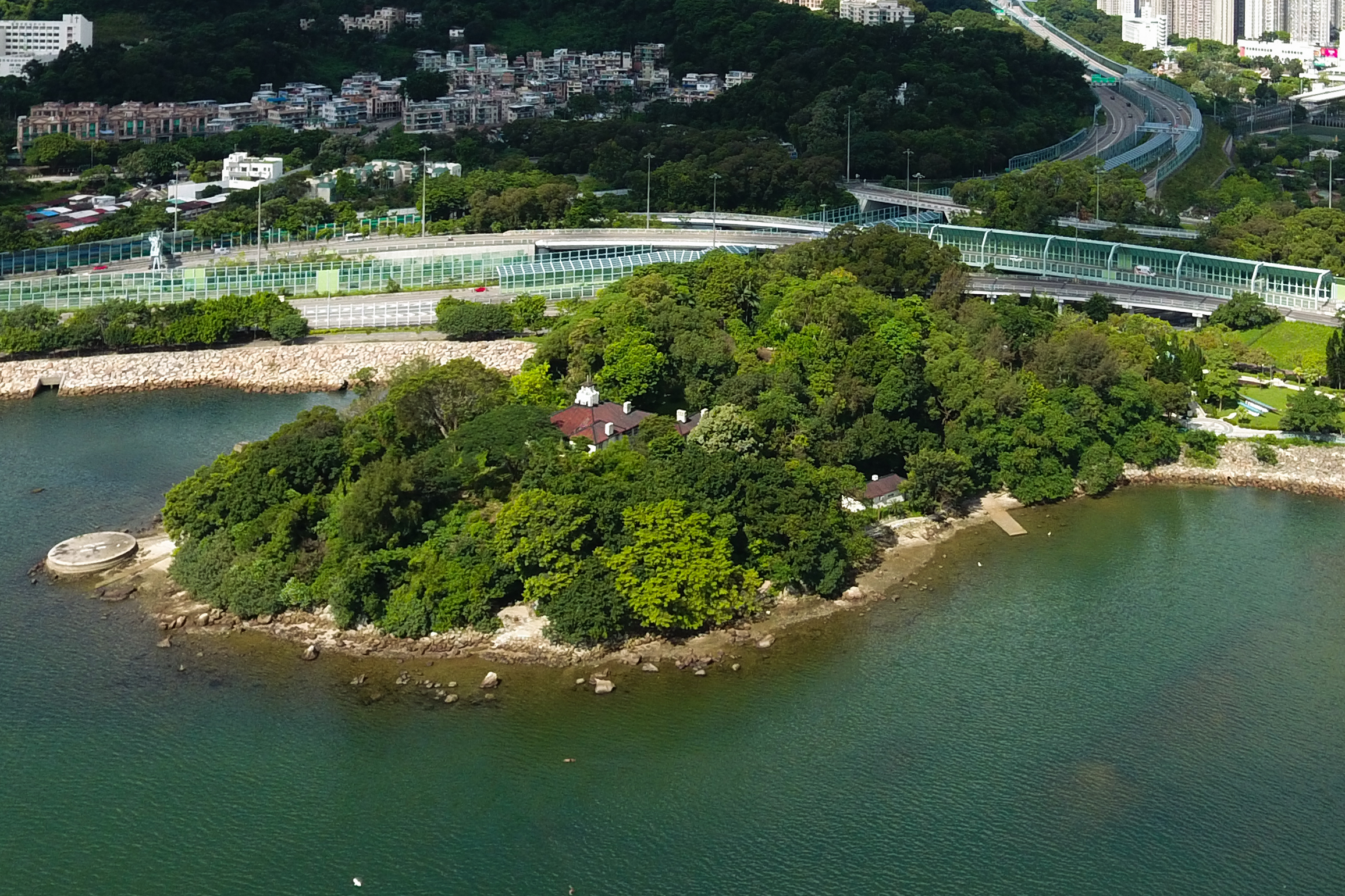
View of Yuen Chau Tsai and Island House in July 2017.

Island House is a historical building located on Island House Lane, Yuen Chau Tsai (元洲仔), Tai Po, New Territories, Hong Kong.

== History ==
Built in 1906, Island House served as the residence for the first British Police Magistrate appointed in 1898.

It was also the official residence of the North District Officer and the residences of District Commissioners for the New Territories. Island House had been resided in by a total of 15 District Commissioners since 1949. The last resident of the Island House was Sir David Akers-Jones, who became the Chief Secretary of Hong Kong in 1985.

Since then, the house has become the Island House Conservation Studies Centre (元洲仔自然環境保護研究中心) after it was passed to the custodianship of WWF HK. To increase public understanding and participation in biodiversity monitoring WWF Hong Kong have been increasingly getting involved in Citizen Science, incorporating iNaturalist and the City Nature Challenge activities into their sites across Hong Kong including Island House.

== Conservation ==
Island House is one of the declared monuments of Hong Kong since 1983.
