= Moon Island =

Moon Island may refer to:

- Comoros islands, an island state located in the Indian Ocean between Madagascar and Mozambique
- Moon Island (Australia), an Australian island off Swansea Heads
- Moon Island (Hong Kong)
- Moon Island (Massachusetts), U.S.
- Tsukishima (Moon Island), Chūō, Tokyo, Japan
- Isla de la Luna (Moon Island), Lake Titicaca, La Paz, Bolivia
- A community in The Archipelago, Ontario, Canada
- An island in St. Mary's River, Michigan
- The German and Swedish name for Muhu island in the Gulf of Riga
- A resort and the site of the 2004 Sinai bombings

== See also ==
- Half Moon Island, an Antarctic island in the South Shetland Islands
- Mohn Islands, in the Kara Sea, Siberia, Russia
- Mon Island, Region Zealand, Denmark
