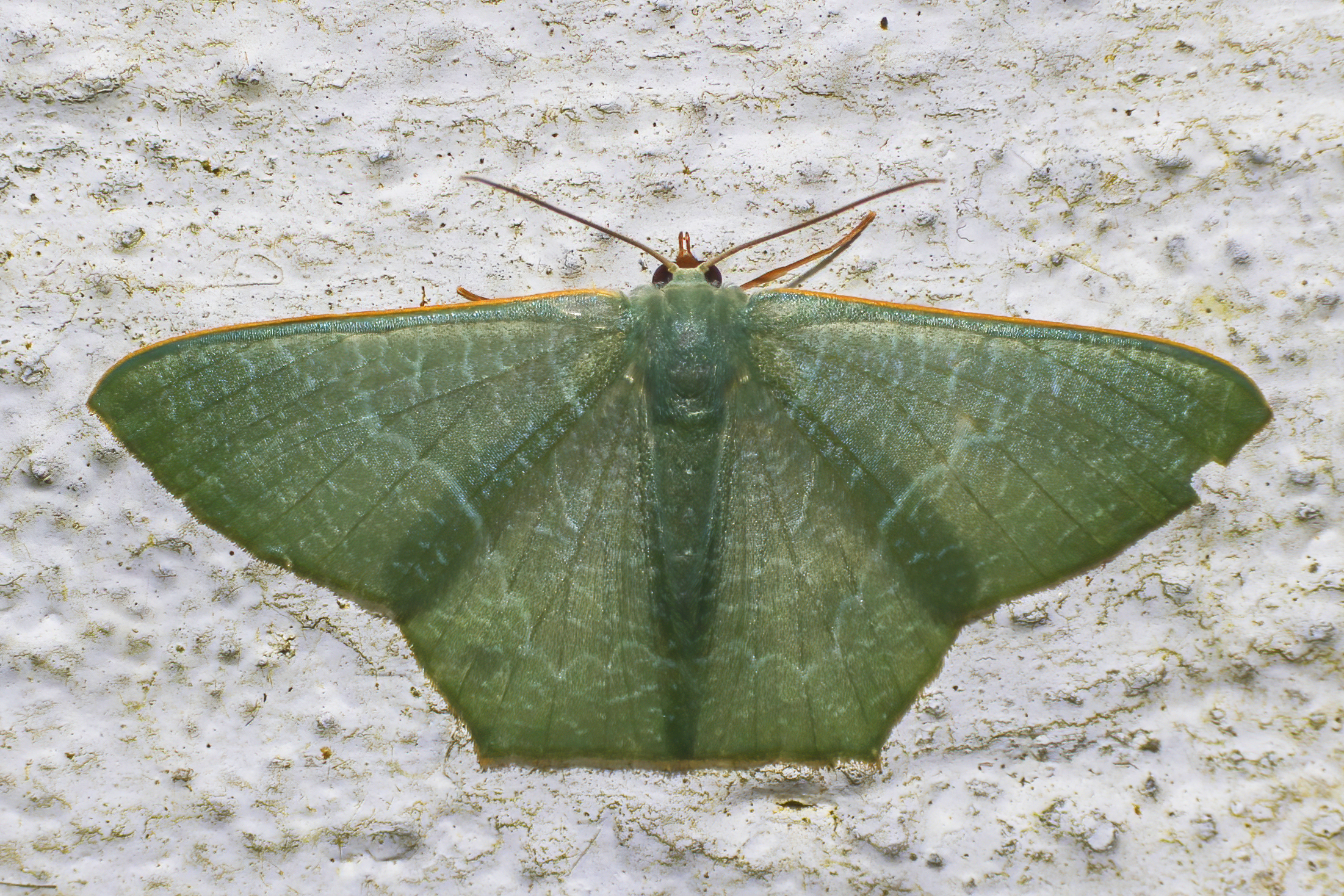
- T. immissaria, Sri Lanka

Scientific classification
- Kingdom: Animalia
- Phylum: Arthropoda
- Class: Insecta
- Order: Lepidoptera
- Family: Geometridae
- Tribe: Hemitheini
- Genus: Thalassodes; Guenée, 1857

= Thalassodes =

Genus of moths

Thalassodes is a genus of moths in the family Geometridae first described by Achille Guenée in 1857.

== Description ==
Palpi with second joint clothed with hair and reaching the apex of the short frontal tuft. Third joint naked and porrect (extending forward). Antennae of male usually bipectinate (comb like on both sides) to two-thirds length. Hind tibia usually dilated with a fold containing a tuft of long hair. Forewings with veins 6, 7, 8, 9 and 10 stalked or vein 6 from cell. Hindwings with angled or produced outer margin to a point at vein 4.

== Species ==
- Thalassodes byrsopis Meyrick, 1886
- Thalassodes chloropsis Meyrick, 1886
- Thalassodes curiosa Swinhoe, 1902
- Thalassodes depulsata Walker, 1861
- Thalassodes dissepta Walker, 1861
- Thalassodes dissista (Walker, 1861)
- Thalassodes dissitoides Holloway, 1996
- Thalassodes dorsilinea Warren, 1903
- Thalassodes halioscia Warren, 1912
- Thalassodes immissaria Walker, 1861
- Thalassodes intaminata Inoue, 1971
- Thalassodes linguissita Holloway, 1996
- Thalassodes maipoensis Galsworthy, 1997
- Thalassodes minor Prout, 1933
- Thalassodes opalina Butler 1880
- Thalassodes opalinoides Holloway, 1996
- Thalassodes pilaria Guenée, 1857
- Thalassodes quadraria Guenée, 1857
- Thalassodes rhytiphorus (Lower, 1893)
- Thalassodes sundissepta Holloway, 1996
- Thalassodes veraria Guenée, 1857
- Thalassodes viridifascia Swinhoe, 1908
