= Hoi Ha =

Coordinates: 22.460414°N 114.328483°E

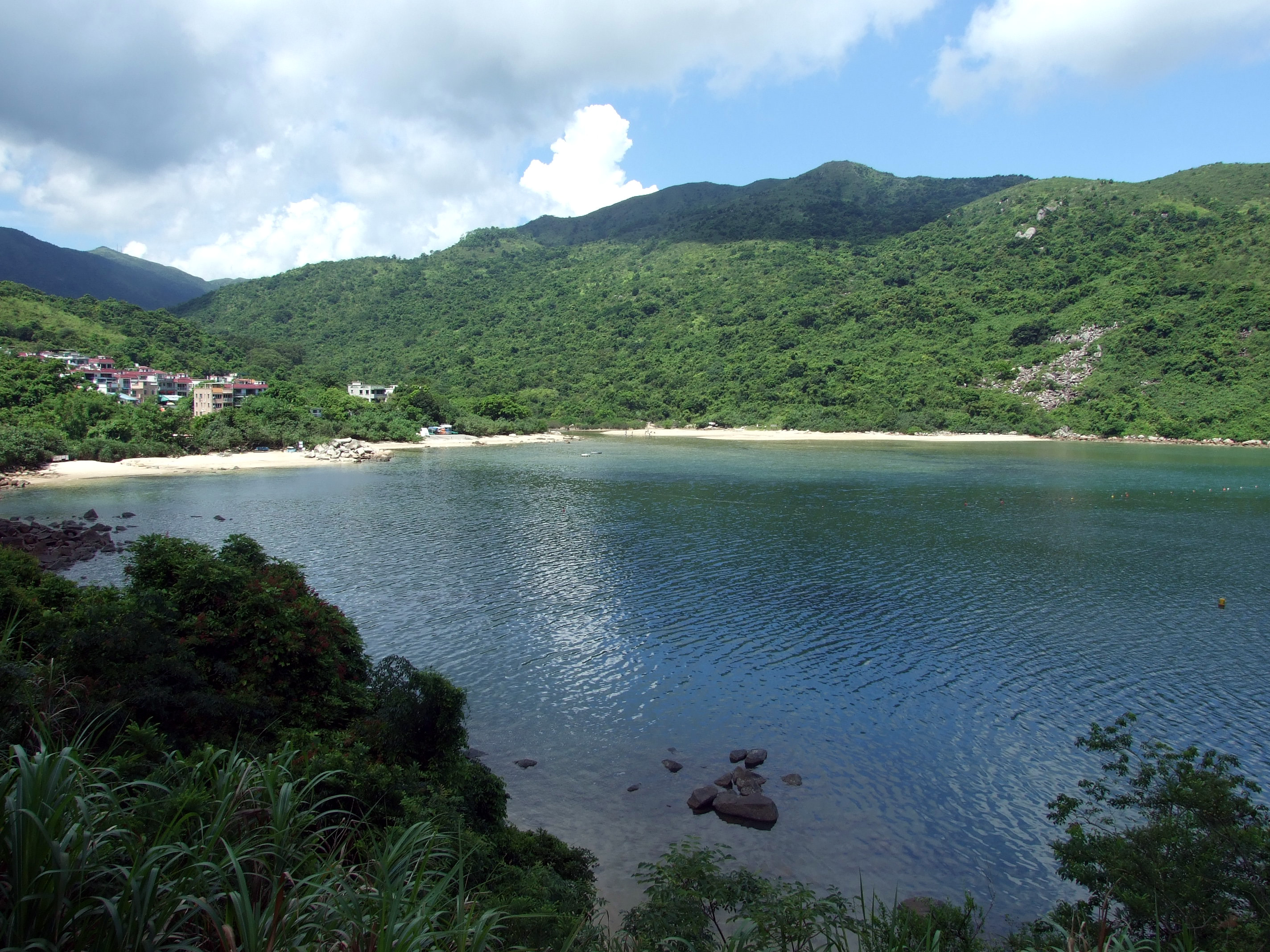
Hoi Ha and Hoi Ha Wan.

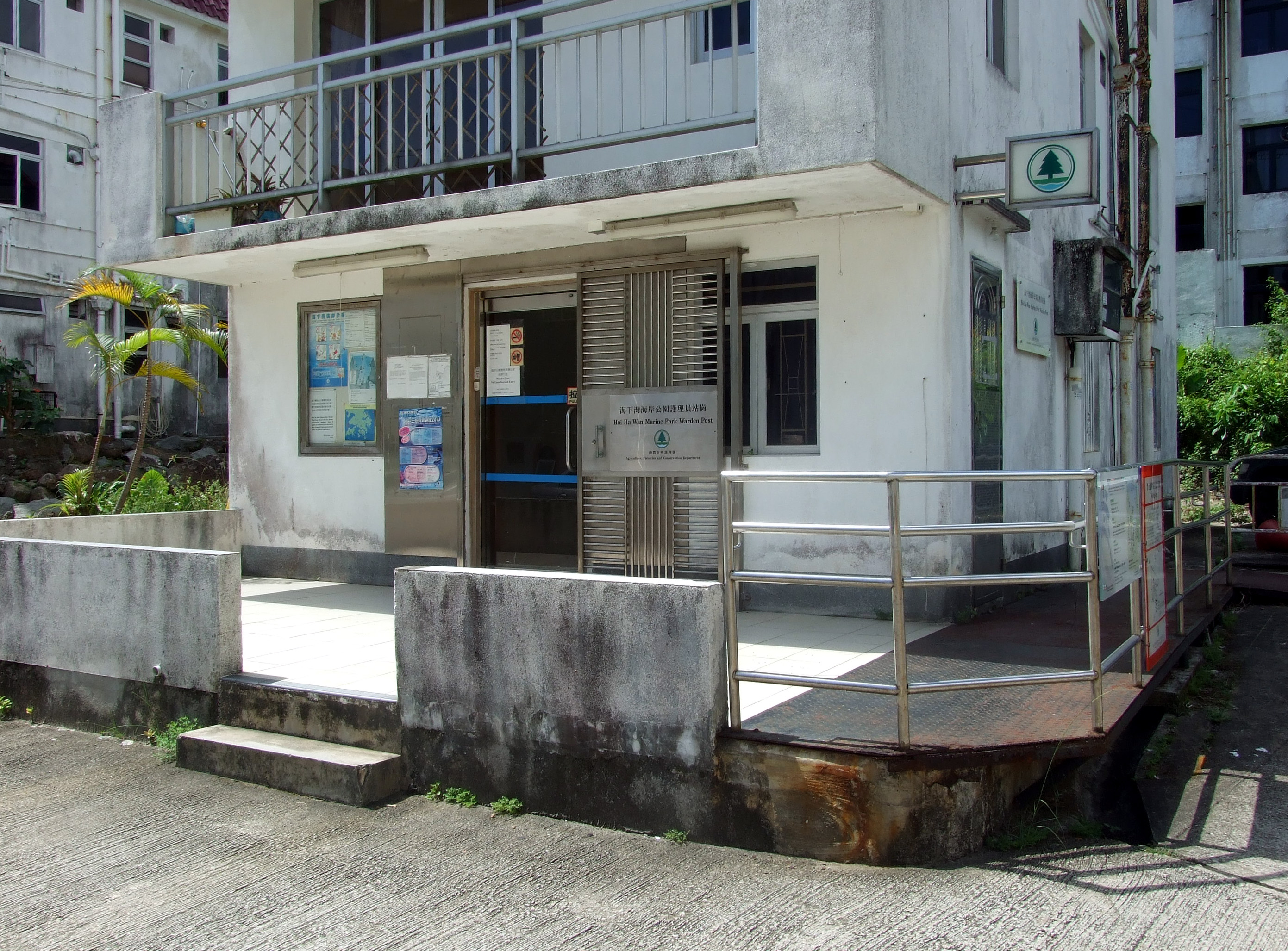
AFCD Hoi Ha Wan Marine Park Warden Post in Hoi Ha.

Hoi Ha (Chinese: 海下; Jyutping: hoi2 haa6) is a place and a village on the innermost shore of Hoi Ha Wan, Hong Kong. It is at the north of Pak Sha O in the Sai Kung Peninsula.

One of the most famous heritage spots in Hoi Ha Wan is the remnants of the lime kilns. It was used to make lime from sea shells and coral. It was likely built in the early 1900s.

== Administration ==
Hoi Ha is a recognized village under the New Territories Small House Policy.

== Name ==
The name Hoi Ha comes from the same Hakka language word which broadly translates as Seashore or Seaside in English. The name Hoi Ha ("海下") is not intuitive to non-Hakka speakers. While "Hoi" (海) means "sea" and "Ha" (下) as "below", it is not commonly used that way in Cantonese which might surprise people as Hoi Ha is a village in Sai Kung, Hong Kong where the dominant Chinese dialect in present day Hong Kong is Cantonese.

== History ==
Hoi Ha village was established in 1811 by a group of Hakka people sharing the family name Yung who arrived at Hoi Ha and started to build houses and farm the land.

== Hoi Ha archaeological site ==
A few coarse pottery sherds, prehistoric pottery sherds, stone implements and ceramic sherds of Tang, Ming and Qing periods were found in Hoi Ha in the two territory-wide survey.

== Hoi Ha lime kiln ==
There are also the remnants of lime kilns. There are total 4 lime kilns in Hoi Ha but only 2 remain comparatively intact; these two kilns were restored by the Antiquities and Monuments Office in 1982 with the generous assistance of the villagers of Hoi Ha (source: Antiquities and Monuments Office)

These two kilns, built by the villagers of Hoi Ha in the early 20th century, were used to make lime by burning corals and shells. They were constructed of rubble stone and lined with crude bricks inside. The villagers collected corals and shells from the sea nearby.

Lime production was once a prosperous local industry particularly at the villages in Sai Kung. The lime was used in agriculture and construction. However, it was gradually replaced by cement after the Second War World

The villagers use to send the lime by boat to nearby Hong Kong Island to sell

The kilns are located on the eastern shore of inner Hoi Ha Wan. Limekiln industry was one of the oldest industries (1800-1939) in Hong Kong, which refined lime from either oyster shells or coral skeletons for construction and agricultural uses. In the processes, limestone, i.e. calcium carbonate, in the shells and corals would be transformed into calcium oxide by means of heating.
