= Mo Chau =

Island in Hong Kong

Native name: 磨洲
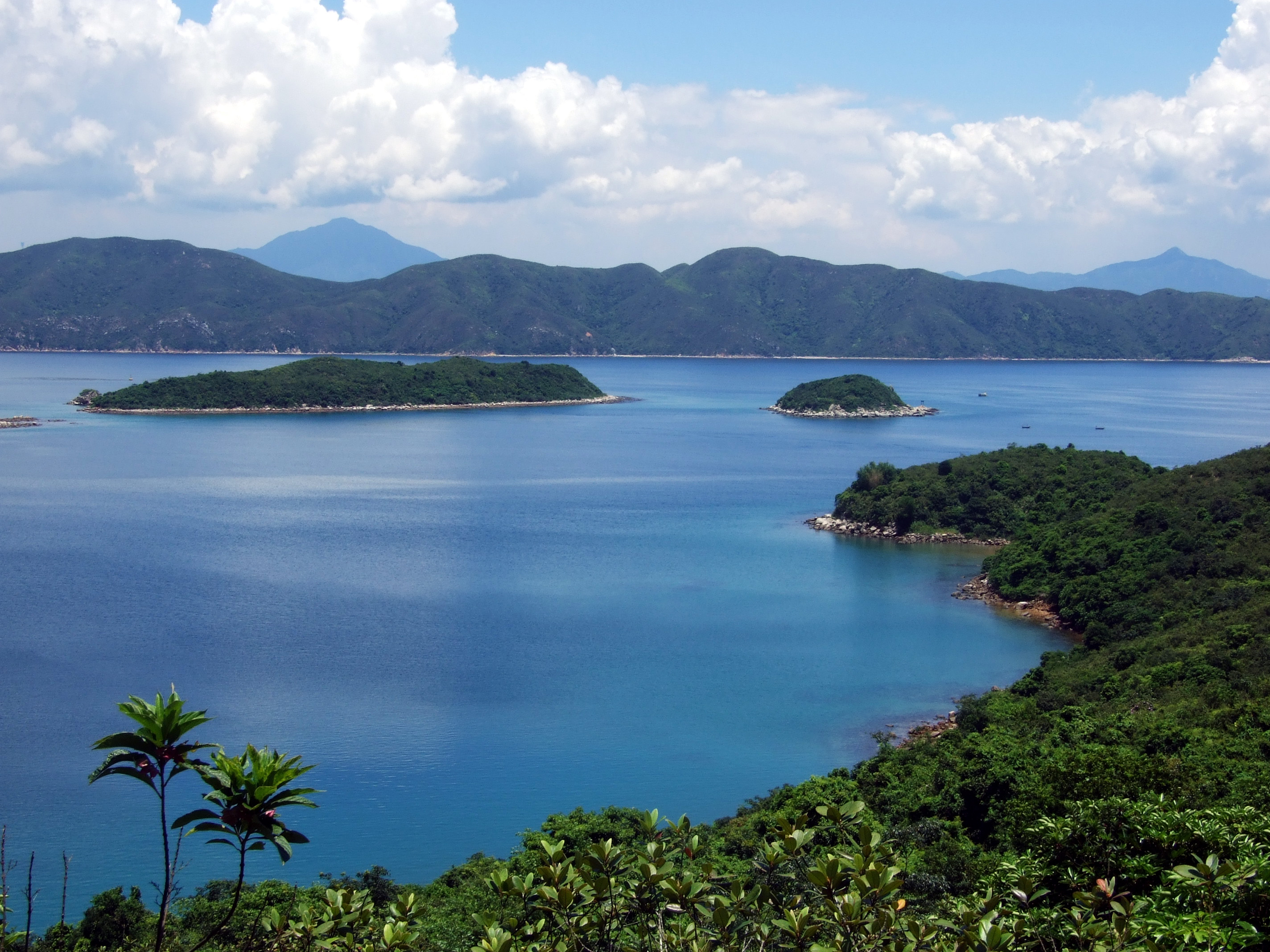
- Flat Island and Mo Chau (small round island) in Tolo Channel

- Location within Hong Kong

Geography
- Coordinates: 22.479905°N 114.333783°E
- Area: 0.04 km^{2} (0.015 sq mi)

Administration
- Hong Kong
- Districts: Tai Po District

Mo Chau (Chinese: 磨洲), or Moon Island is an island in Tolo Channel, in the Tai Po District of Hong Kong. It is located within Hoi Ha Wan Marine Park.

== See also ==
- Hoi Ha Wan
- Islands and peninsulas of Hong Kong
