= Pelagodes spiniseparati =

Scientific classification
- Kingdom: Animalia
- Phylum: Arthropoda
- Clade: Pancrustacea
- Class: Insecta
- Order: Lepidoptera
- Family: Geometridae
- Genus: Pelagodes
- Species: P. spiniseparati

Binomial name
- Pelagodes spiniseparati Holloway, 1996

Species of moth

Pelagodes spiniseparati is a species of moth in the family Geometridae first described by Jeremy Daniel Holloway in 1996. It is found in Peninsular Malaysia and Borneo.

The wingspan of the male is 14–15 mm and the wings are pale bluish green. Fasciae clearly defined.
