= Thalassodes veraria =

Scientific classification
- Kingdom: Animalia
- Phylum: Arthropoda
- Class: Insecta
- Order: Lepidoptera
- Family: Geometridae
- Genus: Thalassodes
- Species: T. veraria

Binomial name
- Thalassodes veraria Guenée, 1858

Synonyms
- Pelagodes veraria (Guenée, 1858)

Species of moth

Thalassodes veraria (or Pelagodes veraria), is a moth of the family Geometridae first described by Achille Guenée in 1858. It is found in Sri Lanka, Fiji, India, Java, Malaysia, New Guinea and Australia.

The species' wingspan is about 3 cm. It is a greenish moth with two faint pale zigzag lines across each wing. Costa yellowish. Each hindwing has an angular margin. The caterpillar feeds on Mangifera indica, Chrysanthemum, Dendranthema, Lagerstroemia speciosa, Litchi chinensis, Rosa indica and other Rosa species.
