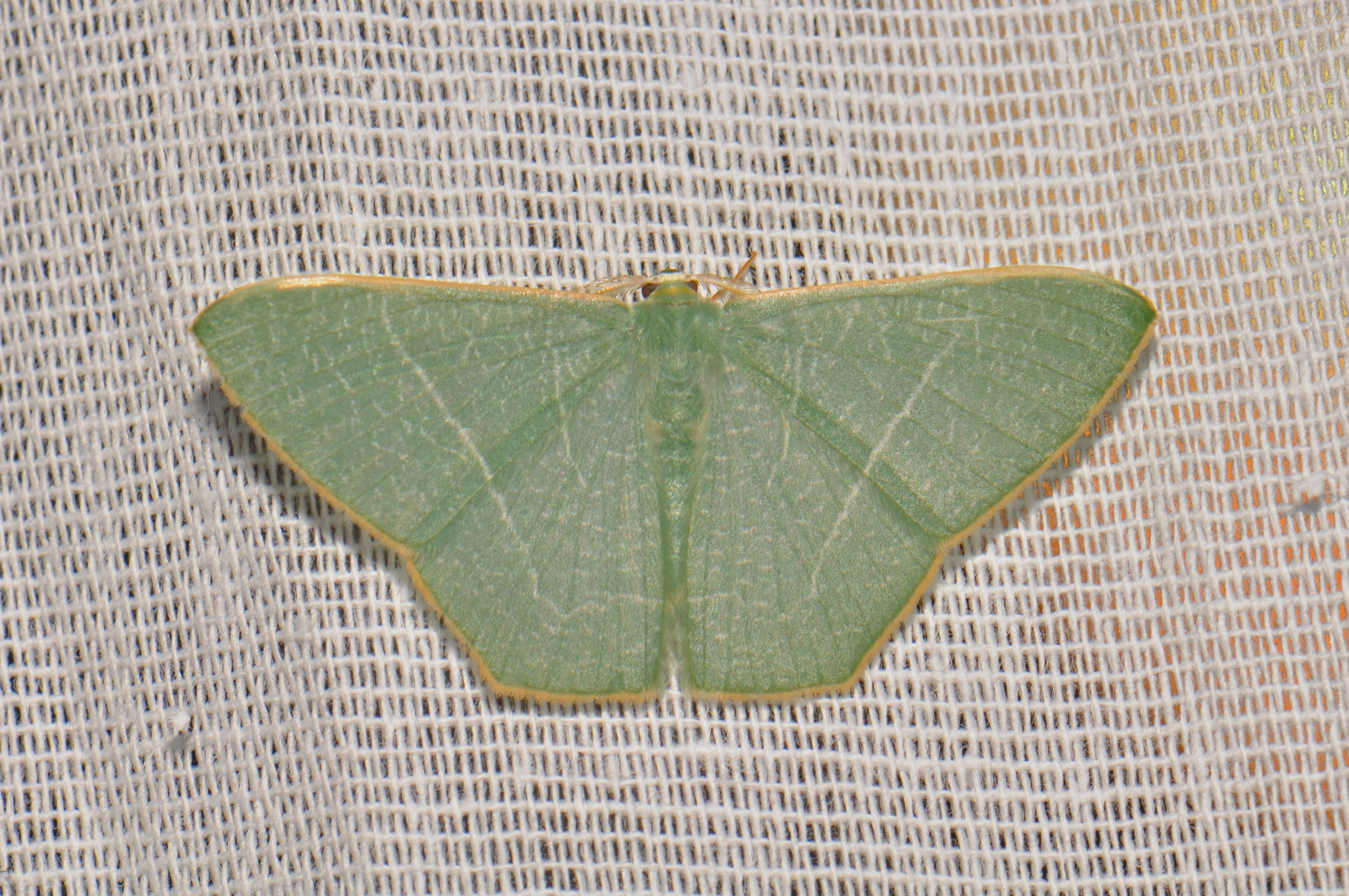

Scientific classification
- Kingdom: Animalia
- Phylum: Arthropoda
- Clade: Pancrustacea
- Class: Insecta
- Order: Lepidoptera
- Family: Geometridae
- Tribe: Hemitheini
- Genus: Pelagodes; Holloway, 1996

= Pelagodes =

Genus of moths

Pelagodes is a genus of moths in the family Geometridae.

== Species ==
- Pelagodes antiquadraria (Inoue, 1976)
- Pelagodes aucta (Prout, 1912)
- Pelagodes clarifimbria (Prout, 1919)
- Pelagodes cochlearis Holloway, 1996
- Pelagodes flavifimbria (Warren, 1912)
- Pelagodes forceps Holloway, 1996
- Pelagodes furvifimbria (Prout, 1917)
- Pelagodes maipoensis (Galsworthy, 1997)
- Pelagodes ogasawarensis (Inoue, 1994)
- Pelagodes proquadraria (Inoue, 1976)
- Pelagodes rana Holloway, 1996
- Pelagodes retusa (Prout, 1922)
- Pelagodes rubellifrons (Warren, 1912)
- Pelagodes semengok Holloway, 1996
- Pelagodes semihyalina (Walker, 1861)
- Pelagodes spiniseparati Holloway, 1996
- Pelagodes subquadraria (Inoue, 1976)
- Pelagodes subviridis (Warren, 1905)
- Pelagodes tridens Holloway, 1996
- Pelagodes veraria (Guenee, 1857)
- Pelagodes viridicaput (Warren, 1897)
- Pelagodes waterstradti Holloway, 1996
