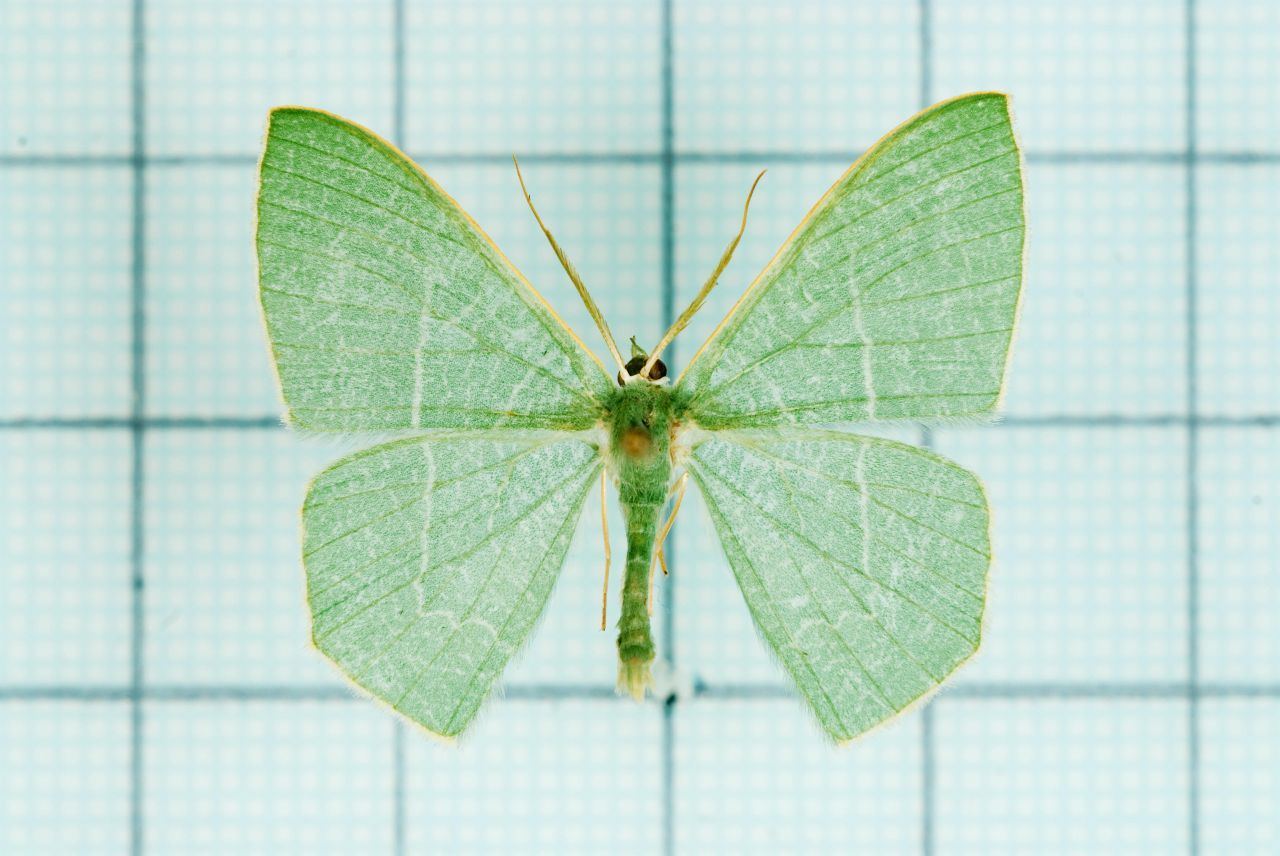

Scientific classification
- Kingdom: Animalia
- Phylum: Arthropoda
- Class: Insecta
- Order: Lepidoptera
- Family: Geometridae
- Genus: Pelagodes
- Species: P. proquadraria

Binomial name
- Pelagodes proquadraria (Inoue, 1976)

Synonyms
- Thalassodes proquadraria Inoue, 1976; Pelagodes proquadrarius

= Pelagodes proquadraria =

Species of moth

Pelagodes proquadraria is a species of moth in the family Geometridae. It is found in Japan, China and Taiwan.

The larvae are a pest on Litchi chinensis.
