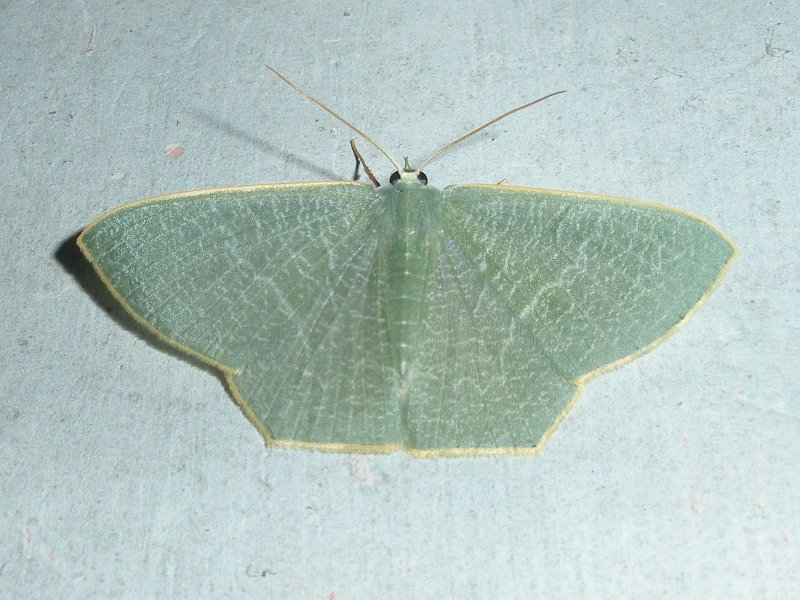

Scientific classification
- Kingdom: Animalia
- Phylum: Arthropoda
- Class: Insecta
- Order: Lepidoptera
- Family: Geometridae
- Genus: Pelagodes
- Species: P. maipoensis

Binomial name
- Pelagodes maipoensis (Galsworthy, 1997)

Synonyms
- Thalassodes maipoensis Galsworthy, 1997

= Pelagodes maipoensis =

Species of moth

Pelagodes maipoensis is a species of moth in the family Geometridae. It is endemic to Hong Kong where it has been found in the Mai Po Nature Reserve and Hong Kong Wetland Park.
