= Thalassodes opalina =

Scientific classification
- Domain: Eukaryota
- Kingdom: Animalia
- Phylum: Arthropoda
- Class: Insecta
- Order: Lepidoptera
- Family: Geometridae
- Genus: Thalassodes
- Species: T. opalina

Binomial name
- Thalassodes opalina Butler, 1880

Synonyms
- Thalassodes proquadraria Han & Xue, 2002 (preocc.)

Species of moth

Thalassodes opalina is a species of moth of the family Geometridae. It is found in Asia, where it is known from India, Thailand, Taiwan, and China.
