= Pelagodes furvifimbria =

Scientific classification
- Kingdom: Animalia
- Phylum: Arthropoda
- Clade: Pancrustacea
- Class: Insecta
- Order: Lepidoptera
- Family: Geometridae
- Genus: Pelagodes
- Species: P. furvifimbria

Binomial name
- Pelagodes furvifimbria (Prout, 1917)

Synonyms
- Thalassodes furvifimbria Prout, 1917

Species of moth

Pelagodes furvifimbria is a species of moth in the family Geometridae first described by Prout in 1917. It is found in Sri Lanka.
