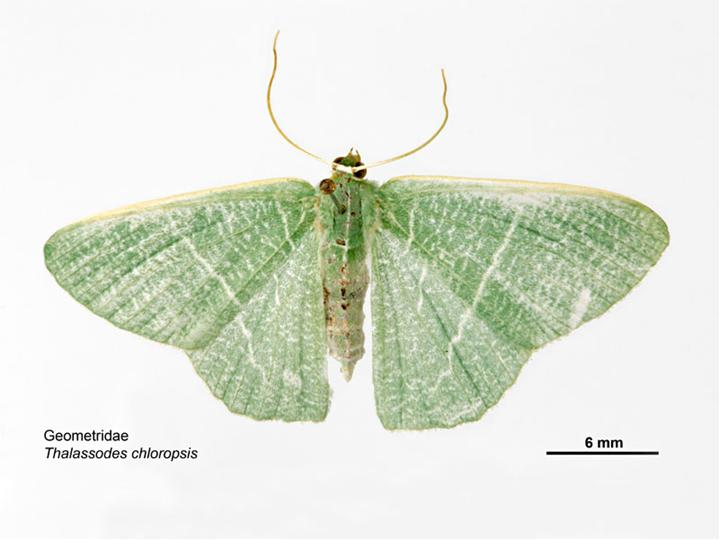
- Dorsal view
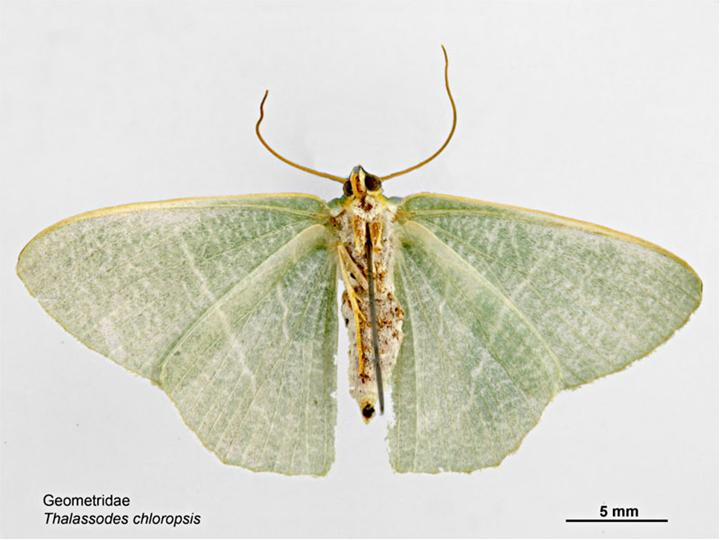
- Ventral view

Scientific classification
- Kingdom: Animalia
- Phylum: Arthropoda
- Class: Insecta
- Order: Lepidoptera
- Family: Geometridae
- Genus: Thalassodes
- Species: T. chloropsis

Binomial name
- Thalassodes chloropsis Meyrick, 1886

= Thalassodes chloropsis =

Species of moth

Thalassodes chloropsis is a moth of the family Geometridae first described by Edward Meyrick in 1886. It is found in Fiji.

The wingspan is 23–34 mm.
