= Pelagodes clarifimbria =

Scientific classification
- Kingdom: Animalia
- Phylum: Arthropoda
- Clade: Pancrustacea
- Class: Insecta
- Order: Lepidoptera
- Family: Geometridae
- Genus: Pelagodes
- Species: P. clarifimbria

Binomial name
- Pelagodes clarifimbria (Prout, 1919)

Synonyms
- Thalassodes clarifimbria Prout, 1919; Sternitornatodes clarifimbria (Prout, 1919)

Species of moth

Pelagodes clarifimbria is a species of moth in the family Geometridae first described by Prout in 1919. It is found in Sri Lanka, Peninsular Malaysia and Borneo.

The adult has bluish-green wings. In male genitalia, socii are broad, well developed gnathos with the lateral arms strongly expanded, tongue like.
