= Ngan Chau =

Ngan Chau (Chinese: 銀洲) can refer to 3 islands in Hong Kong:

- Ngan Chau, an islet off Peng Chau
- Round Island a.k.a. Ngan Chau in Southern District
- Flat Island a.k.a. Ngan Chau, near the north shore of Sai Kung Peninsula
