= Mai Po Marshes =

Nature reserve in Hong Kong

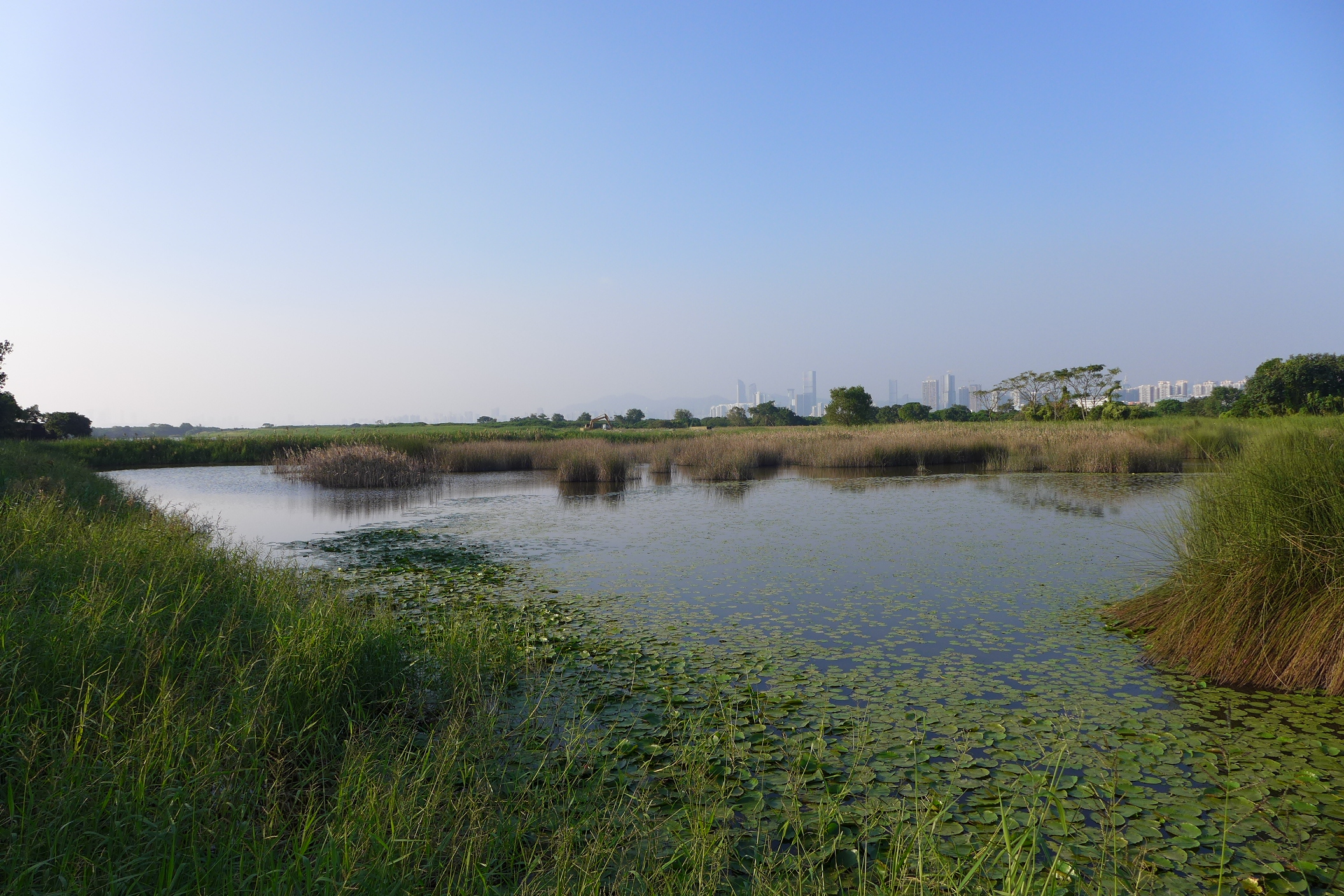
- Fish pond in Mai Po

- Location within Hong Kong
- Location: San Tin, Hong Kong
- Nearest city: Yuen Long
- Coordinates: 22°29′56″N 114°02′45″E
- Website: wwf.org.hk/en/whatwedo/conservation/wetlands/managemaipo/

Ramsar Wetland
- Official name: Mai Po Marshes and Inner Deep Bay
- Designated: 4 September 1995
- Reference no.: 750

Mai Po Marshes
- Traditional Chinese: 米埔濕地
- Simplified Chinese: 米埔湿地
Transcriptions
Standard Mandarin
- Hanyu Pinyin: Mǐpǔ Shīdì
Hakka
- Romanization: Mi^{3}bu^{4} Sip^{5}ti^{4}
Yue: Cantonese
- Jyutping: mai5 bou3 sap1 dei6

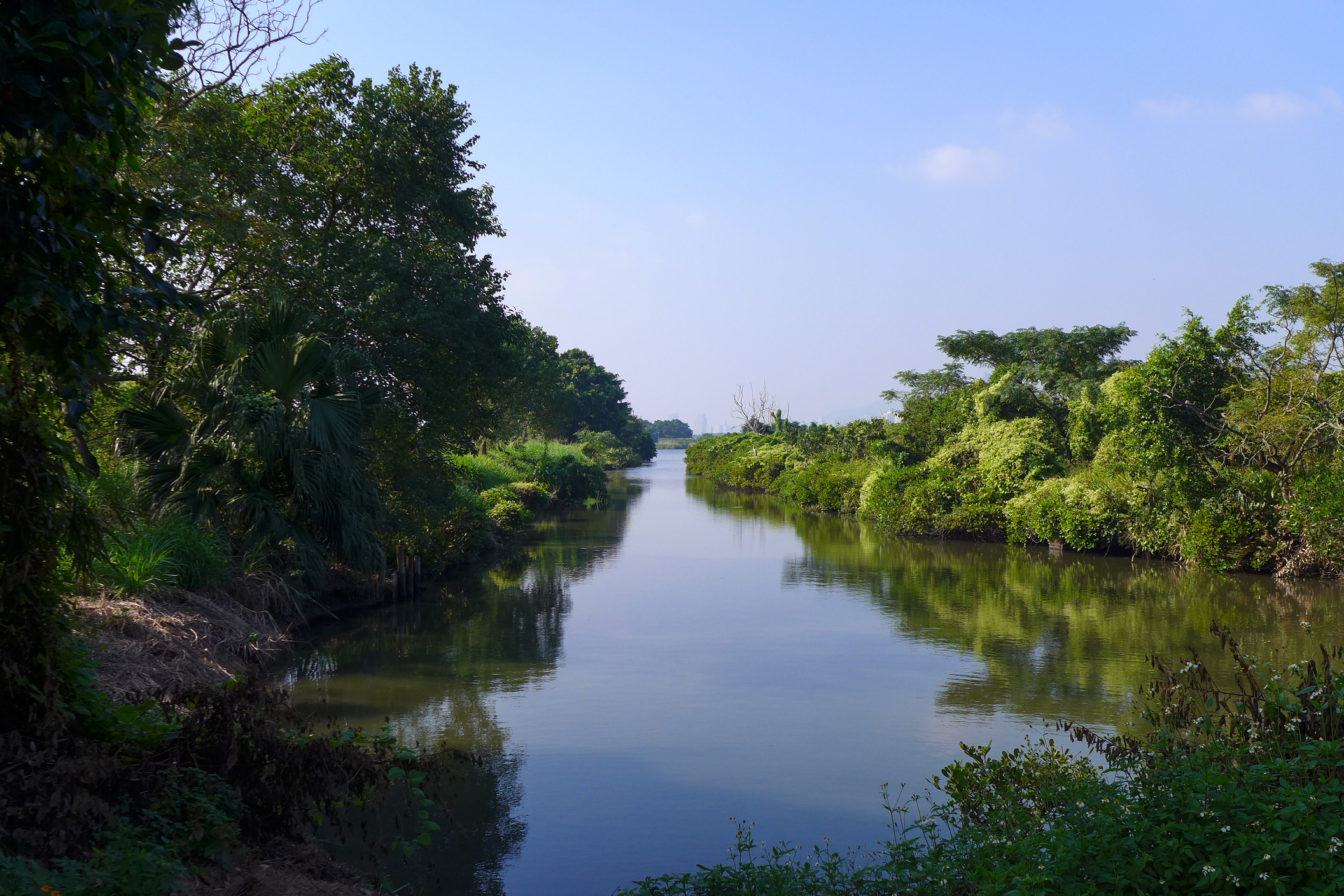
Gei wai

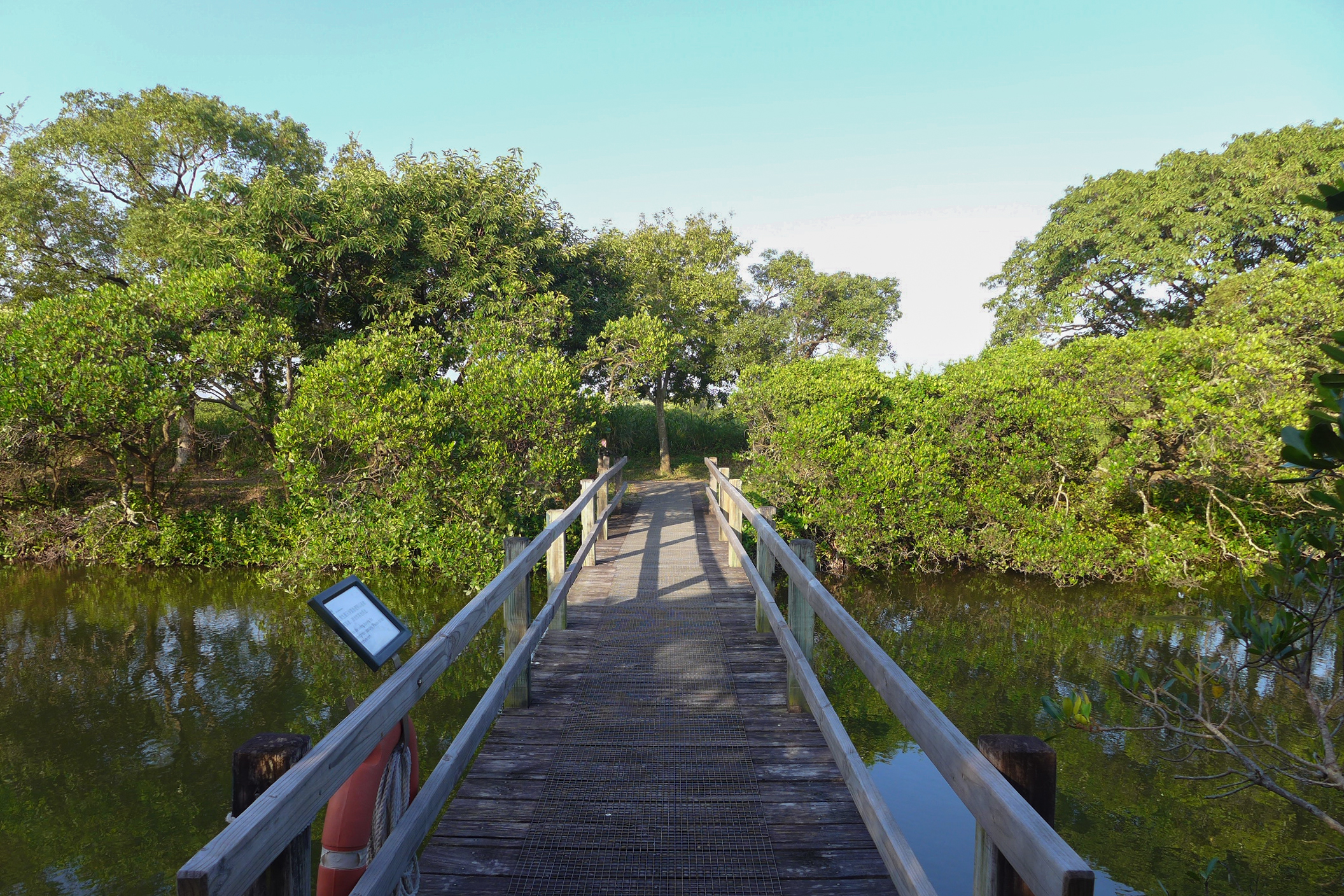
Mangrove boardwalk

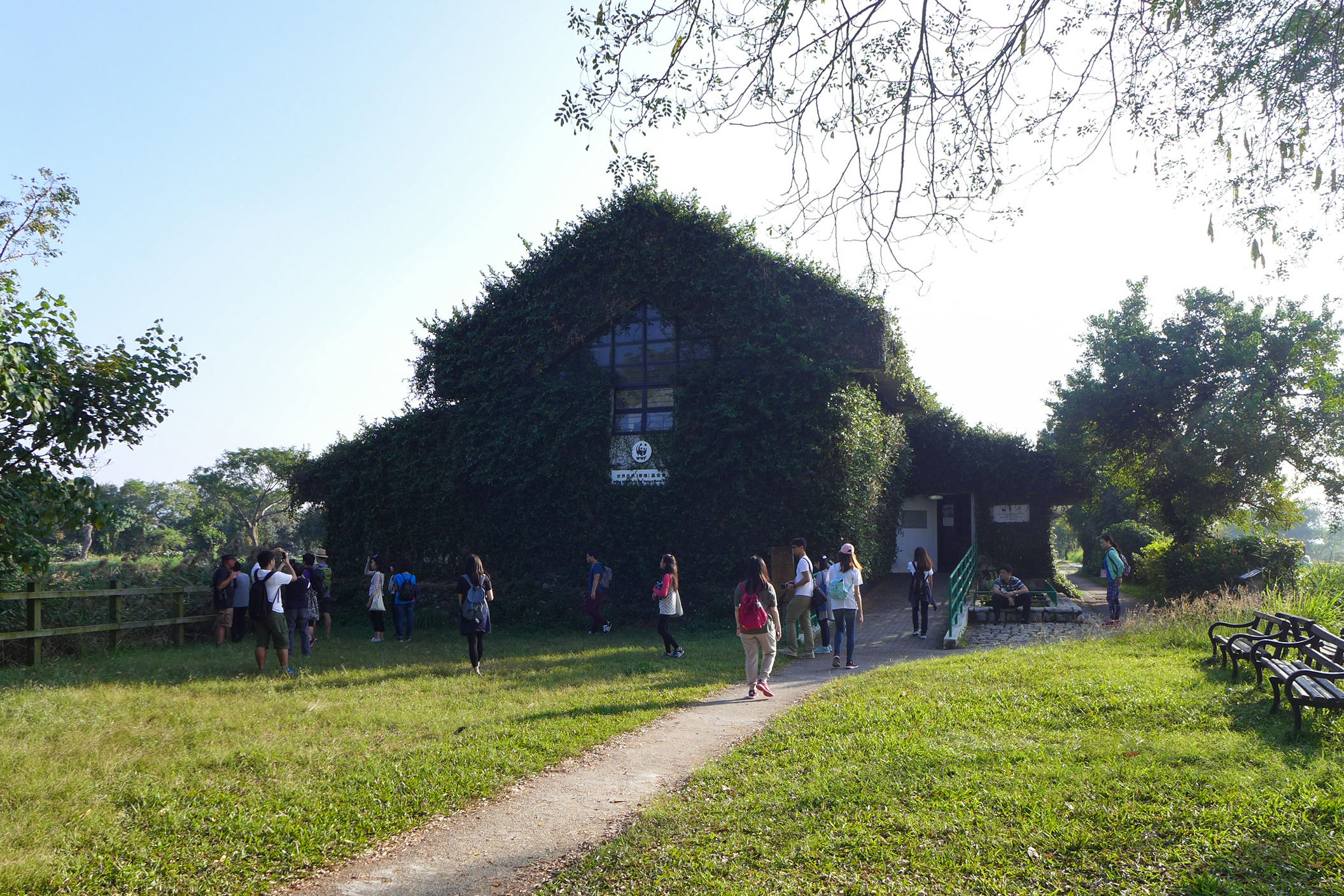
Wildlife Education Centre

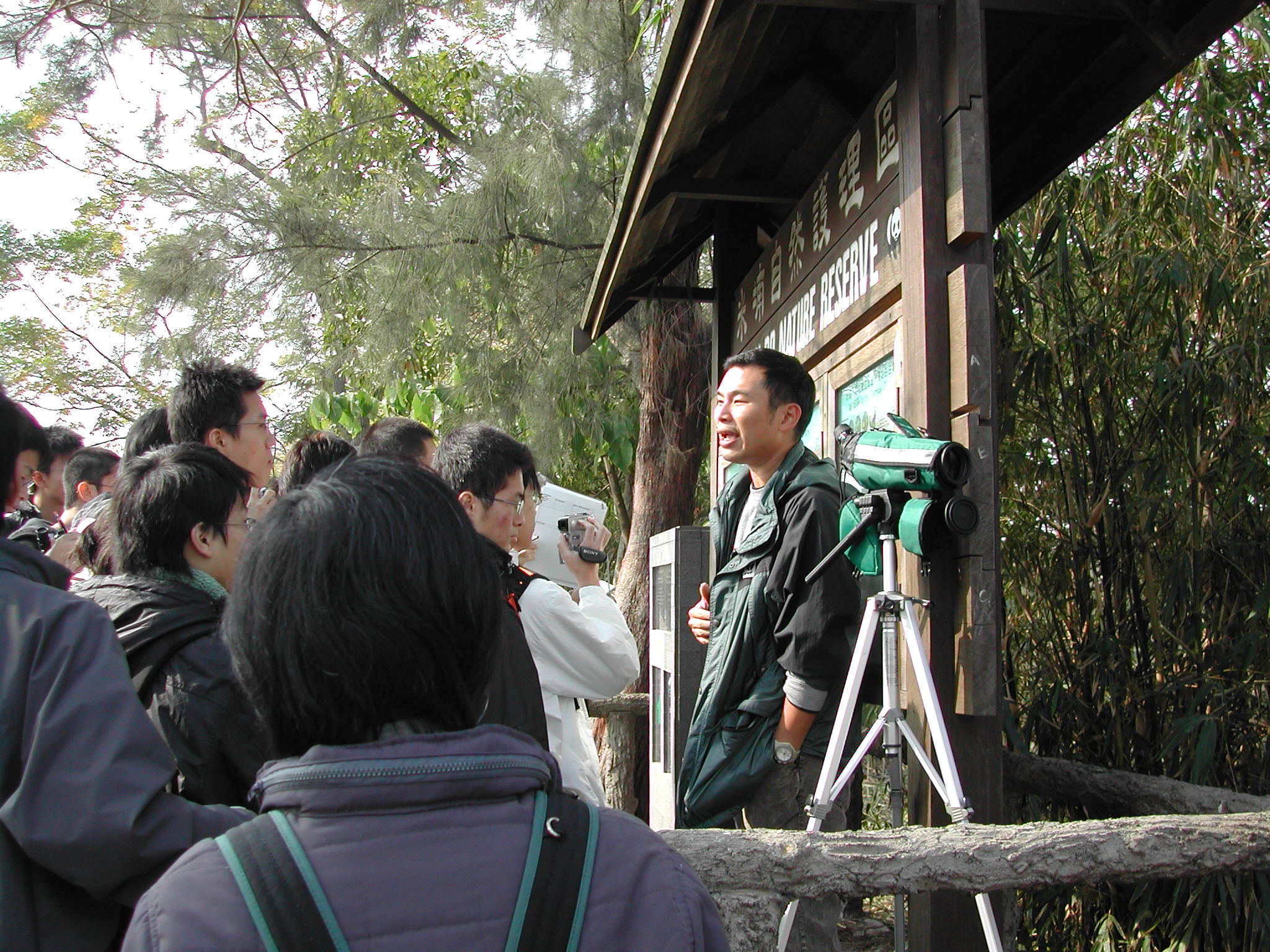
A guide giving a lesson to a student outing tour

Mai Po Marshes (Chinese: 米埔濕地; Hong Kong Hakka: Mi^{3}bu^{4} Sip^{5}ti^{4}) is a nature reserve located in San Tin near Yuen Long in Hong Kong. The nature reserve covers 380 acres (1.5 km^{2}) of Deep Bay, an internationally significant shallow estuary, at the mouths of Sham Chun River, Shan Pui River (Yuen Long Creek) and Tin Shui Wai Nullah. The nature reserve is located within the Inner Deep Bay Ramsar site. Mai Po Marshes has been managed by the World Wide Fund for Nature Hong Kong (WWF) since 1983. Access to the nature reserve is partially restricted and requires visiting permits.

The nature reserve supports globally important numbers of wetland birds, which arrive in winter and during spring and autumn migrations. The nature reserve also hosts a large diversity of mammals, reptiles, and insects.

Various educational and research activities operate at the nature reserve to monitor animal populations with help from public participation.

== Protected status ==
=== Conservation status ===
Inner Deep Bay was listed as a Ramsar site under the Ramsar Convention on 4 September 1995. This Ramsar site covers 1500 acres (6 km^{2}) and is managed by the Agriculture, Fisheries and Conservation Department. Mai Po Marshes occupies a 380-acre subset of the broader Ramsar site.

Deep Bay faces several threats, including pollution, local urban development plans and rising mudflat levels that may arise from intense urbanization, especially (in recent years) on the north, Shenzhen side of the bay.

=== Access ===
While the area was taken out of the Frontier Closed Area on 15 February 2012, Mai Po Nature Reserve remains a restricted area under the Wild Animals Protection Ordinance (Chapter 170) to minimize disturbance to wildlife.

WWF is responsible for visits in the reserve, requiring visitors to have a 'Mai Po Marshes Entry Permit' to be able to enter the reserve. Individuals can apply for a permit by writing to the Agriculture, Fisheries & Conservation Department of the Hong Kong Government. The aforementioned Individual Permits normally take about a week to be processed.

Mai Po Marshes receives some 32,000 visitors annually.

== Biodiversity ==
In recent years, it housed over 55,000 migrating birds, across over 350 species, including Saunders's gull (Chroicocephalus saundersi) and a quarter of the world's Black-faced spoonbill (Platalea minor) population. However, the overall numbers are declining every year. The critically endangered spoon-billed sandpiper (Calidris pygmaea) is still recorded regularly on migration. The reserve also includes inter-tidal mangroves along with 24 traditionally operated shrimp ponds (called Gei Wai locally) to provide food for the birds.

38 mammal species inhabit the reserve, more than anywhere else in Hong Kong. Mai Po is home to one of the highest densities of leopard cat in the territory; however, they are nocturnal and rarely seen. Small Asian mongooses are quite common in the reserve, often encountered by visitors near Gei Wai ponds during the day in winter. A small population of Eurasian otters, a locally endangered species, is found in Mai Po.

The marshes also have rich insect biodiversity, hosting the endemic Mai Po bent-winged firefly (Pteroptyx maipo), the first species of the genus to be recorded in China.

== Education and research ==
WWF Hong Kong has been carrying out firefly surveys of the nature reserve to monitor seasonal population changes of the endemic Mai Po bent-winged firefly (Pteroptyx maipo). The surveys have also incorporated citizen science participation, using platforms such as iNaturalist and events such as the City Nature Challenge into activities at the Mai Po center.

== Avian flu outbreak ==
In February 2008, the Hong Kong government closed Mai Po for 21 days following the discovery of a great egret infected with H5N1, also known as avian flu. The closing marked the fourth in as many years and was consistent with the government's policy of closing Mai Po whenever an infection is discovered within a 3 kilometer radius of the premises.

The World Wide Fund for Nature (WWF) criticized the government, however, for what it called a discrepancy between the standards for closing Mai Po and the comparably less strict standards applied in urban areas. WWF wanted compensation of HK$1 million. WWF then claimed that the government had not compensated it for lost income.

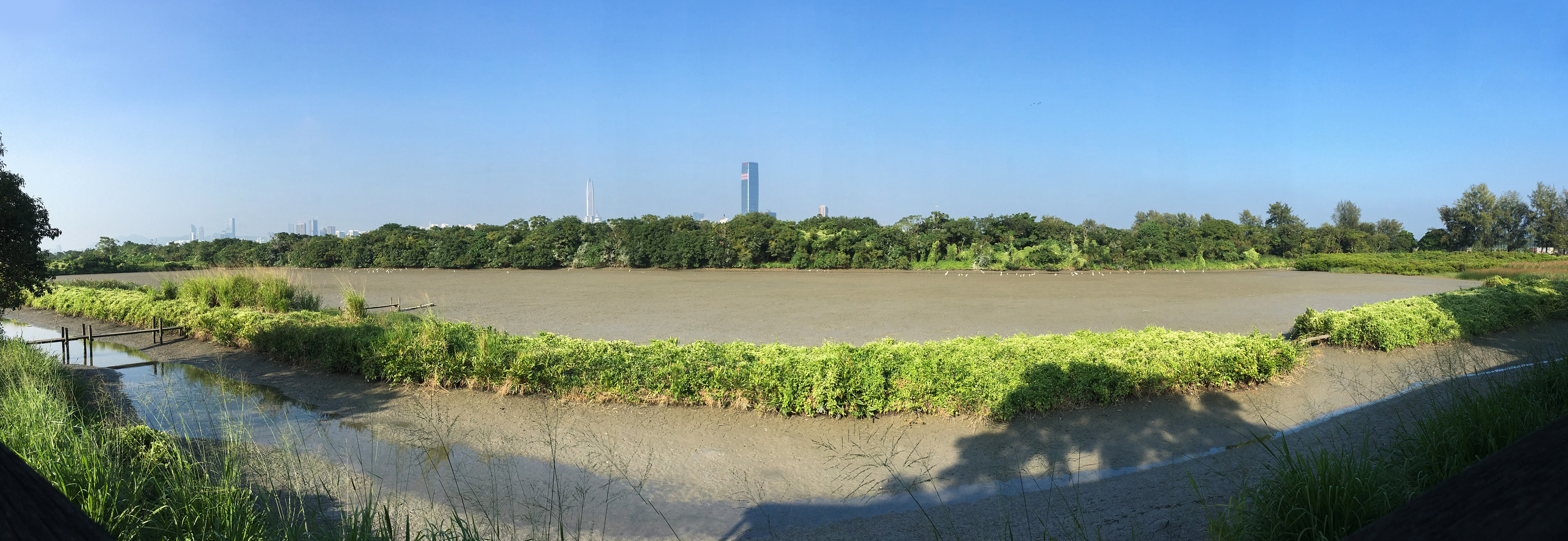
Panorama of the Mai Po reserve

== See also ==
- Hong Kong Wetland Park
- Nam Sang Wai
- Fung Lok Wai
- Environment of Hong Kong
- List of buildings, sites and areas in Hong Kong
- Mai Po Tsuen
