= Marine parks in Hong Kong =

Protected natural areas in Hong Kong

The Marine Parks Ordinance protects and conserves the marine environment and a rich collection of aquatic animals and plants, such as corals, sea grasses and dolphins. The ordinance also provides the legal framework for the designation, control and management of marine parks and marine reserves. The Marine Parks and Marine Reserve Regulation provides for the prohibition and control of certain activities in marine parks and marine reserve.

== The Marine Parks/Reserve ==
| Number | Name | Established | Area (hectares) | District |
|---|---|---|---|---|
| 1 | Hoi Ha Wan | July 1996 | 260 | New Territories |
| 2 | Yan Chau Tong Marine Park | July 1996 | 680 | New Territories |
| 3 | Sha Chau and Lung Kwu Chau Marine Park | November 1996 | 1200 | New Territories |
| 4 | Tung Ping Chau Marine Park | November 2001 | 270 | New Territories |
| 5 | The Brothers Marine Park | December 2016 | 970 | Lantau |
| 6 | Southwest Lantau Marine Park | April 2020 | 650 | Lantau |
| 7 | South Lantau Marine Park | June 2022 | 2,067 | New Territories |
| 8 | Cape D'Aguilar Marine Reserve | July 1996 | 20 | Hong Kong Island |

These areas covers a total area of 34 km². They comprise scenic coastal areas, seascapes and important marine habitats. Marine parks and reserve are managed for conservation, education, recreation and scientific studies. In marine parks, visitors are encouraged to appreciate the beauty and diversity of marine life. Diving, snorkeling, swimming, canoeing, sailing, underwater photography and school visits are popular activities in marine parks.

== Conservation and education ==
In marine parks, a multiple use approach is adopted. Activities compatible with the objectives of marine parks and non-destructive to the marine environment are allowed. Activities destructive to marine environment and coastal features such as trawling, unauthorised fishing, hunting or collecting of marine life are prohibited. On-site information boards, mooring buoys and markers are installed. Educational activities such as guided tours, beach clean-ups, seabed clean-ups and public lectures are regularly organised. In marine reserve, recreational activities are prohibited and the area is protected for nature conservation and scientific studies. AFCD is exploring the possibility for further extension of marine parks to place more important marine habitats under protection.

== Conservation concerns ==
The major concerns in relation to Hong Kong's marine parks, as announced by various green groups include:

- Fish surveys from the marine parks are not showing a recovery of fish numbers.
- Marine ecology appear to be out of balance, with occasional surges of invertebrates, such as coral eating snails in Hoi Ha Wan.
- Continued decline of the long-standing fisheries industry in Hong Kong. Adequately protected Marine Protected Areas ("MPA") in other regimes has been shown to improve overall fisheries yields

Green groups point towards the following factors as needing attention.

- Significant reduction of fishing pressure in Marine Parks from both indigenous villagers and from "Bona fide" (read commercial) fishermen.
- Stop all damaging fishing methods in marine parks such as the use of narrow filament nets. Using these nets are a non targeted fishing technique and because they are low cost they are readily abandoned, causing ongoing damage.
- Size of the marine parks are inadequate as a conservation tool. They currently cover less than 1% of Hong Kong's marine areas. Various conservation groups are suggesting that these need to increase to at least 40%.
- Inadequate patrolling and protection of the fisheries resources in the parks. The AFCD is not provided with adequate resource to stop illegal fishing, especially from mainland fishermen.

== See also ==
- Conservation in Hong Kong
- WWF Hong Kong - Marine Protected Areas
