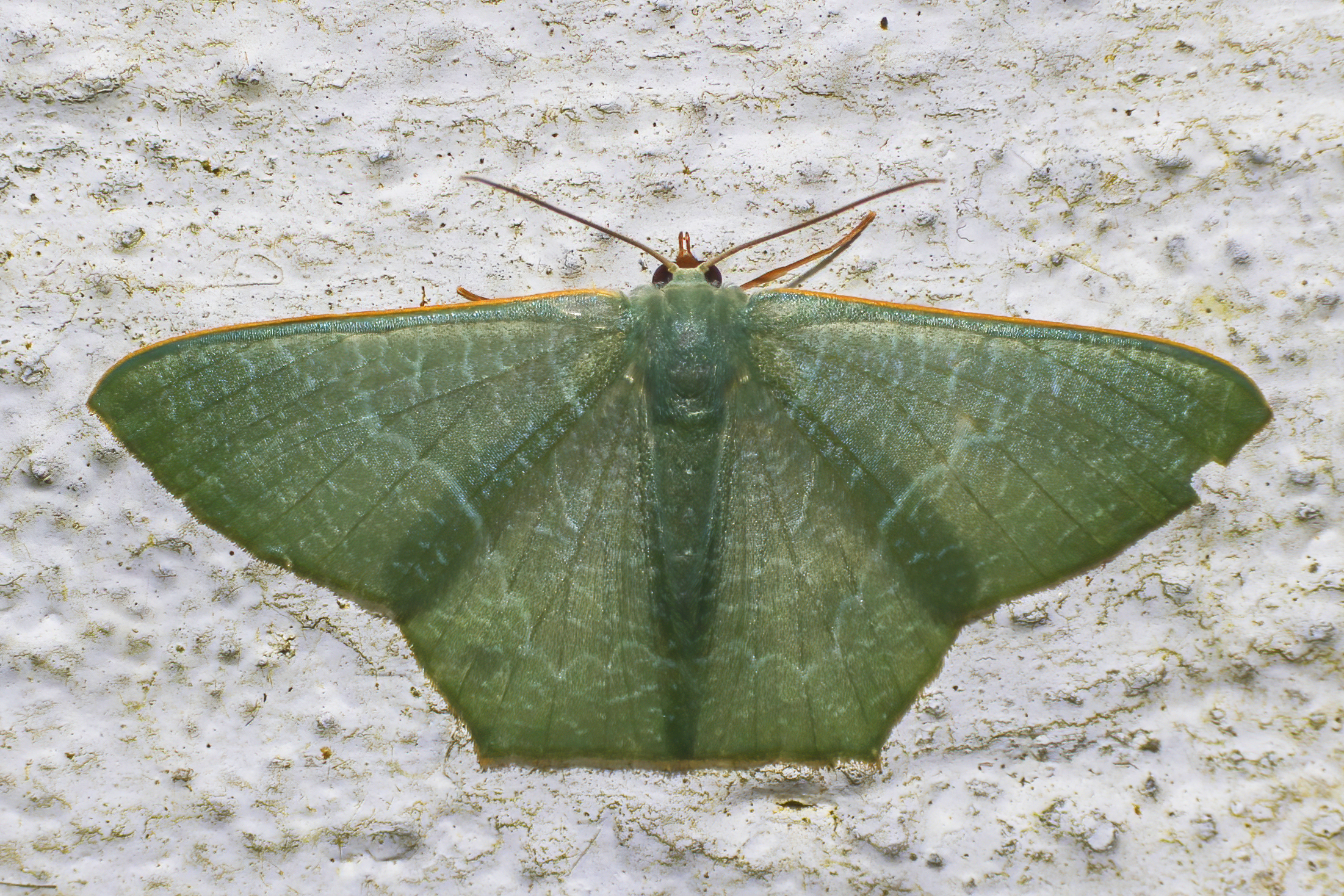
- Thalassodes immissaria, Sri Lanka

Scientific classification
- Kingdom: Animalia
- Phylum: Arthropoda
- Class: Insecta
- Order: Lepidoptera
- Family: Geometridae
- Genus: Thalassodes
- Species: T. immissaria

Binomial name
- Thalassodes immissaria Walker, 1861

= Thalassodes immissaria =

Species of moth

Thalassodes immissaria is a moth of the family Geometridae first described by Francis Walker in 1861. It is found in the Oriental tropics of China, India, Myanmar, Sri Lanka, Hong Kong, Japan, Borneo, Vietnam, Sumatra, Sulawesi and the Ryukyu Islands. The populations in Ryukyu were often classified as a subspecies - Thalassodes immissaria intaminata Inoue, 1971. However, in 2005 this subspecies was upgraded to a distinct species, which can be distinguished from immissaria by careful examination of the male genitalia.

It is a green moth with faint white lines. There is a very narrow yellowish line border on the wings. Male have plumose (feather-like) antennae, female has filiform (thread-like) antennae. It is very similar to other congener species, therefore identification should done through examination of genitalis. In the male, the genitalia possess a long, tongue-like valva basal process and a tongue-like harpe. The caterpillar feeds on Mangifera indica, Lagerstroemia, Nephelium, Eucalyptus camaldulensis, Dimocarpus longan and Litchi chinensis.
