= Flat Island (Hong Kong) =

Island of Hong Kong

Native name: 銀洲
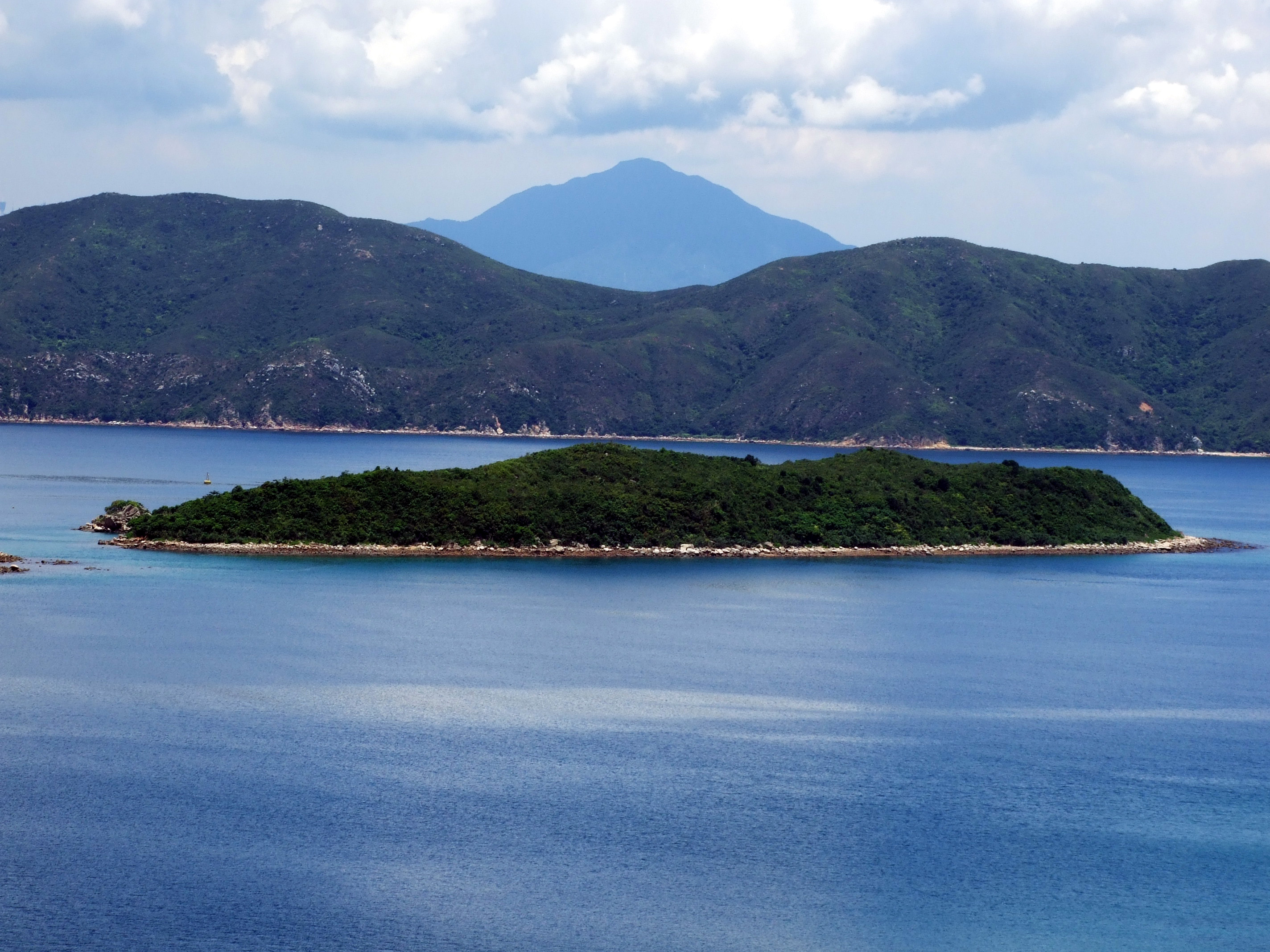

- Location within Hong Kong

Geography
- Coordinates: 22°28′43″N 114°19′54″E

Administration
- Hong Kong

Flat Island or Ngan Chau (Chinese: 銀洲) is an island located near the north shore of Sai Kung Peninsula of Hong Kong. It is at the mouth of in Hoi Ha Wan and the boundary of Hoi Ha Wan Marine Park (海下灣海岸公園).

== See also ==
- Ngan Chau for other islands with the same Chinese name.
