= City Nature Challenge =

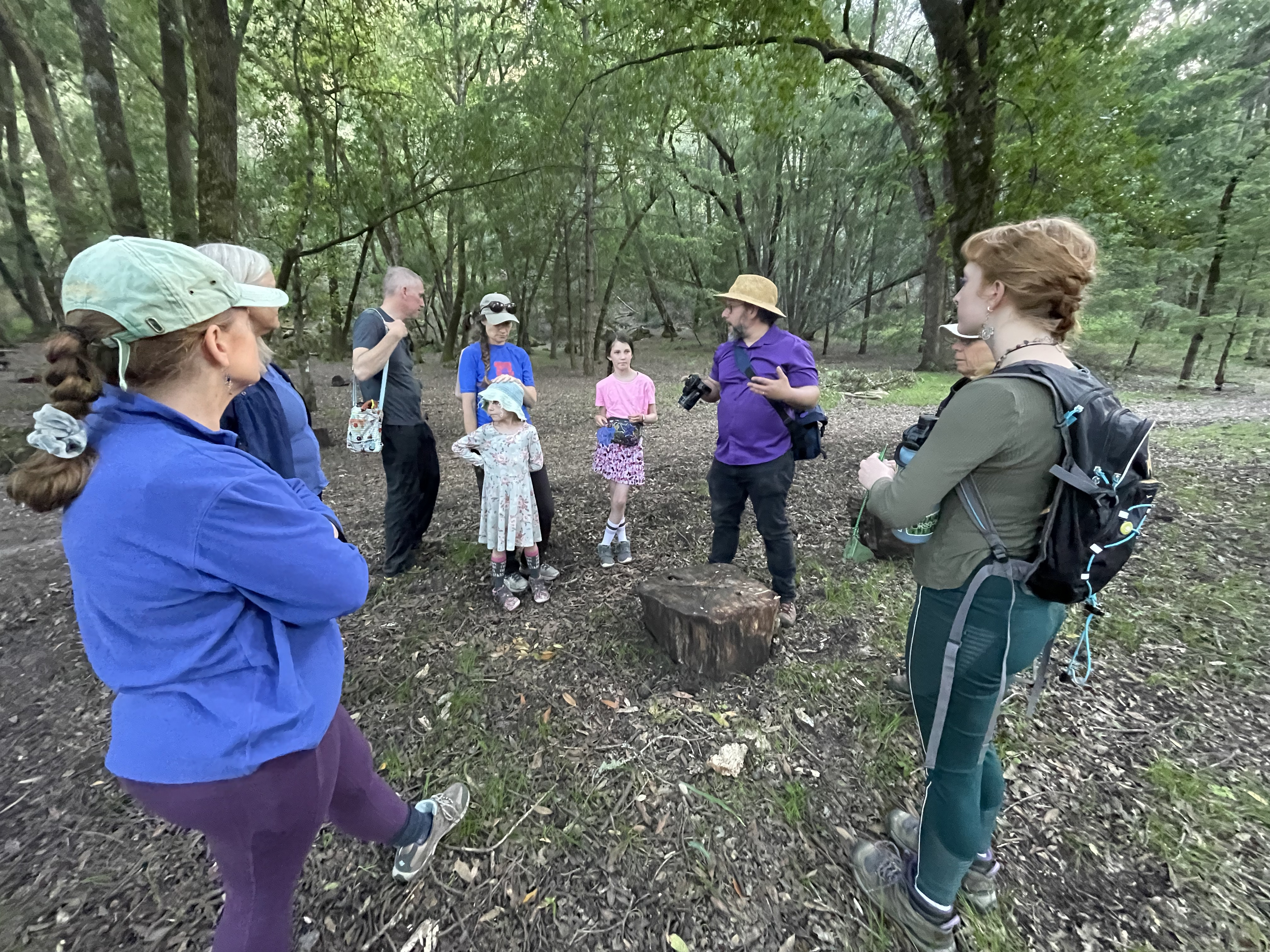
People gathering for the 2023 City Nature Challenge at Sugarloaf Ridge State Park, United States

The City Nature Challenge is an annual, global, community science competition to document urban biodiversity. The challenge is a bioblitz that engages residents and visitors to find and document plants, animals, and other organisms living in urban areas. The goals are to engage the public in the collection of biodiversity data, with three awards each year for the cities that make the most observations, find the most species, and engage the most people.

Participants primarily use the iNaturalist app and website to document their observations. The observation period is followed by several days of identification and the final announcement of results. Participants need not know how to identify the species; help is provided through iNaturalist's automated species identification feature as well as the community of users on iNaturalist, including professional scientists and expert naturalists.

== History ==
The City Nature Challenge was founded by Alison Young and Rebecca Johnson of the California Academy of Sciences and Lila Higgins of the Natural History Museum of Los Angeles County. The first event took place in 2016, in which Los Angeles competed against San Francisco and won in all three categories (most observations, most species, most participants). In 2017 the challenge expanded to 16 cities across the United States, with a different city winning in each category. In 2018 it expanded to 68 cities across the world, but US participation still dominated and San Francisco won in all categories. The 2019 challenge was more than doubled in scale and took the competition beyond its US roots, with Cape Town, winning two of the three categories.

In 2020, the organizers removed the competition aspect due to the COVID-19 pandemic, stating, "To ensure the safety and health of all participants, this year’s CNC is no longer a competition. Instead, we want to embrace the collaborative aspect of sharing observations online with a digital community, and celebrate the healing power of nature as people document their local biodiversity to the best of their ability." This change remained in effect for following years.

City Nature Challenge has helped inspire regional yearly bioblitzes such as the Asia Nature Challenge and Great Southern Bioblitz that can help fill global participation and biodiversity data gaps that are not just focused on cities. These bioblitzes allow parts of the world with different seasons to observe life at times of the year they have more biodiversity on display. Asia Nature Challenge also has helped focus and fill taxonomic data gaps through coordinating with projects like the Big Butterfly Count in Nepal.

== Results ==
Event	Cities	Observations	Species	Participants
14–21 April 2016	2	19k Winner: (United States) Los Angeles (10k)	3k Winner: (United States) Los Angeles (2k)	1k Winner: (United States) Los Angeles (1k)
14–18 April 2017	16	125k Winner: (United States) Dallas/Fort Worth (24k)	9k Winner: (United States) Houston (2k)	4k Winner: (United States) Los Angeles (1k)
27–30 April 2018	68	441k Winner: (United States) San Francisco (42k)	18k Winner: (United States) San Francisco (3k)	17k Winner: (United States) San Francisco (2k)
26–29 April 2019	159	963k Winner: (South Africa) Cape Town (54k)	31k Winner: (South Africa) Cape Town (5k)	32k Winner: (United States) San Francisco (2k)
24–27 April 2020	244	815k	32k	41k
30 April–3 May 2021	419	1.2m	45k	51k
29 April–2 May 2022	445	1.7m	50k	67k
28 April–1 May 2023	486	1.9m	57k	66k
26–29 April 2024	690	2.4m	66k	84k
25–28 April 2025	669	3.3m	74k	103k
24-27 April 2026	754	3m	76k	106k
