= List of King's College, Hong Kong alumni =

The following is a list of notable alumni from King's College, Hong Kong.

== 1930s ==
- Chung Sze-yuen (鍾士元) GBE GBM – Hong Kong mechanical engineer, industrialist, business executive and politician
- D. C. Lau (劉殿爵) – prominent sinologist; author of the widely read translations of Tao Te Ching, Mencius and The Analects; contributed to the Proper Cantonese pronunciation movement
- George Ho (何佐芝) GBS OBE JP – Hong Kong media mogul; fifth son of influential Hong Kong businessman Robert Hotung
- Harry Fang (方心讓) GBM CBE JP – Hong Kong orthopaedic surgeon; legislator and campaigner who promoted rehabilitation services; widely known as the "father of rehabilitation" in Asia
- James Wu Man-hon (胡文瀚) – former chairman of the Federation of Hong Kong Industries
- Ma Lin (馬臨) – Vice-Chancellor of the Chinese University of Hong Kong (CUHK) from 1978 to 1987; founder of Shaw College, the fourth constituent college of CUHK
- Simon Li (李福善) GBM – Hong Kong senior judge and politician
- Stanley Kwan Shih-kuang (關士光) MBE – Hong Kong banker who created the internationally known Hang Seng Index in 1969

== 1940s ==
- Chiu Hin-kwong (招顯洸) OBE JP – former member of the Executive Council and Legislative Council of Hong Kong

== 1950s ==
- Harnam Singh Grewal (高禮和) CBE ED – career civil servant of Hong Kong; former Secretary for the Civil Service in the Government of Hong Kong
- Hui Ki On (許淇安) GBS CBE QPM – the last Commissioner of the Royal Hong Kong Police from 1994 to 1997; the first Commissioner of Hong Kong Police from 1 July 1997 to 1 January 2001
- Hui Yin-fat (許賢發) OBE JP – member of the Legislative Council of Hong Kong (1991—1995) for Social Services; member of the Executive Council in 1991; member of the Provisional Legislative Council; director of Hong Kong Council of Social Service from 1973 to 2001
- Li Kwan Ha (李君夏) – the first ethnic Chinese to serve as the Commissioner of the Royal Hong Kong Police in Hong Kong

== 1960s ==
- Cheung Kwok Che (張國柱) – member of the Legislative Council of Hong Kong (Functional constituency, Social Welfare)
- Ching W. Tang (鄧青雲) – American physical chemist; awarded the Wolf Prize in Chemistry
- David Chan Yuk-cheung (陳毓祥) – prominent leader of the Baodiao movement in Hong Kong
- Deborah Chung (鍾端玲) – American scientist and author
- Hui Chiu-yin (許招賢) BBS – director and general manager of New World First Ferry in Hong Kong; former Chief Superintendent of Marine Regional in Hong Kong Police Force
- Inez Fung (馮又嫦) – professor of atmospheric science at the University of California, Berkeley
- Lam Chiu Ying (林超英) SBS – Hong Kong meteorologist; bird-watcher; conservationist and blogger; director of the Hong Kong observatory from 2003 through 2009; honorary fellow of the Royal Meteorological Society; Honorary University Fellow of the University of Hong Kong; honorary president of the Hong Kong Bird Watching Society
- Law Chi-kwong (羅致光) JP – Hong Kong politician; associate professor in social work at the University of Hong Kong
- Leung Chun Ying (梁振英) GBM GBS JP – third and incumbent Chief Executive of the Executive Council of the Hong Kong Special Administrative Region
- Patrick Lau Lai-chiu (劉勵超) SBS JP– former career civil servant in the Hong Kong Government; retired in 2007 as Director of Lands, head of the Lands Department
- Raymond Or (柯清輝) SBS JP – Vice-chairman of G-Resources Group; Vice-chairman and chief executive officer of China Strategic Group; chairman of Esprit Holdings

== 1970s ==
- Ceajer Chan Ka-keung (陳家強) SBS, JP, Secretary for Financial Services and the Treasury in the Government of Hong Kong
- Johnson Lam Man-hon (林文瀚), Vice President of the Court of Appeal of the High Court (Hong Kong)

== 1980s ==
- Wilson Shieh (石家豪), Hong Kong artist
