= Ng Cho-nam =

Hong Kong environmental studies scholar and conservationist (1960–2019)

Ng Cho-nam SBS, JP
- 吳祖南
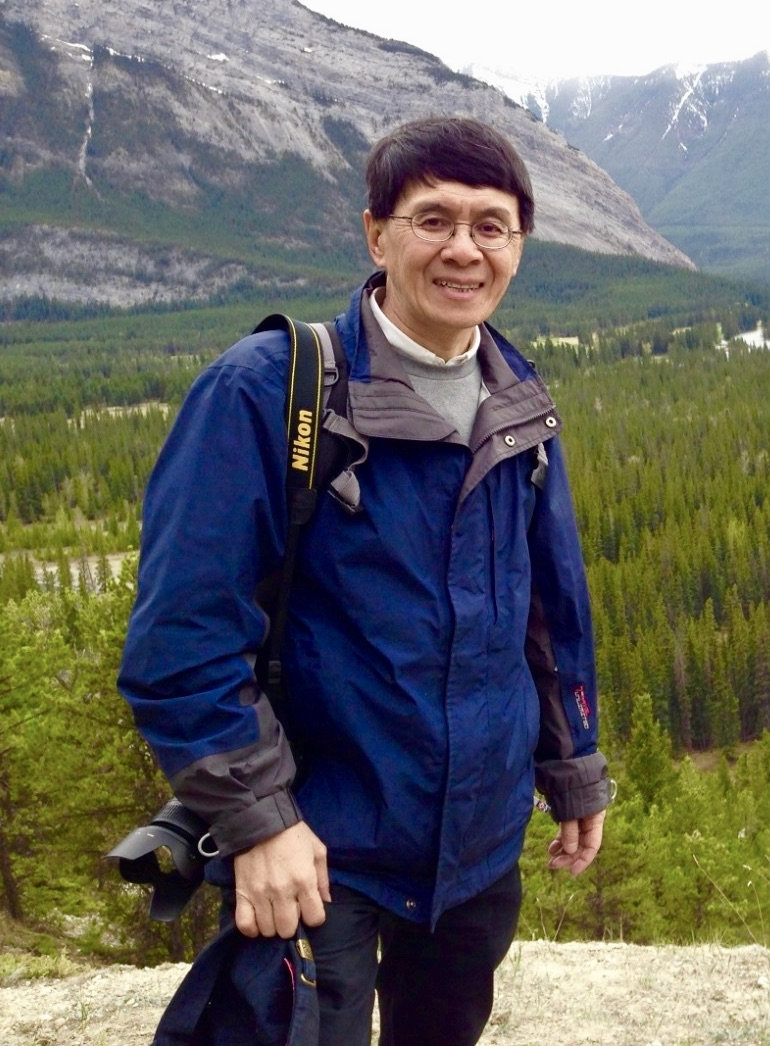

Director of the Conservancy Association
- In role 2000–2019

Chairman of the Conservancy Association
- In role 1995–1999

Director of the Hong Kong Countryside Foundation
- In role 2011–2019

Vice Chairman of Hong Kong Birdwatching Society
- In role 2004–2019

Member, Advisory Council on the Environment, Hong Kong
- In role 1994–2012

Chairman; Management Committee of Mai Po Nature Reserve and Education Centre, WWF Hong Kong
- In role 1995–2000

Personal details
- Born: 吳祖南; Ng Cho-nam; August 15, 1960 British Hong Kong
- Died: December 13, 2019 (aged 59) Queen Mary Hospital, Hong Kong
- Spouse: Pinky
- Children: 2
- Education: Salesian English School
- Alma mater: University of Lancaster (BSc., Ph.D)
- Known for: Environmental Policy and Planning; Environmental Impact Assessment; Nature Conservation; Sustainable Development; Water Governance; Long Valley
- Awards: Silver Bauhinia Star (2014); Justice of the Peace (2009); Bronze Bauhinia Star (2004)

Chinese name
- Traditional Chinese: 吳祖南
- Simplified Chinese: 吴祖南
Transcriptions
Standard Mandarin
- Hanyu Pinyin: Wú zǔ nán
Yue: Cantonese
- Jyutping: ng4 zou2 naam4
- Title: Associate Professor of Geography

Academic background
- Doctoral advisor: Peter Young

Academic work
- Discipline: Environmental Sciences; Geography
- Institutions: University of Hong Kong; City University of Hong Kong

Ng Cho-nam (Chinese: 吳祖南, August 15, 1960 – December 13, 2019), SBS, JP, was a Hong Kong environmental studies scholar and conservationist who taught as an associate professor within the Department of Geography at the University of Hong Kong. He served as a top advisor on numerous Hong Kong government committees in areas of conservation, sustainable development, environmental protection, urban planning, and was an active member in various environmental NGOs. He was the director of the Conservancy Association from 2000 to 2019.

Ng was among the first generation of Hong Kong environmentalists. He is most notable for his contribution to the campaign that led to the rescue of Long Valley wetlands in 1999, the JC-WISE Project (Jockey Club Water Initiative on Sustainability and Engagement) and the ongoing sustainable Lai Chi Wo program. He was awarded the Bronze Bauhinia Star (2004) and the Silver Bauhinia Star (2014) by the Hong Kong SAR Government "in recognition of his meritorious public and community service, particularly for his contribution to environmental protection and promotion of nature conservation in Hong Kong."

== Early life and education ==
Ng was born in 1960 in British Hong Kong. He grew up in Central, Hong Kong, where his mother and father were hawkers on Li Yuen Street East. He completed his primary education at Kei Yan Primary School and his secondary education at the Salesian English School in 1978. He became interested in nature at a very young age, and joined the Scout Association of Hong Kong in secondary school.

Ng obtained his Bachelor of Science (with Honors) in 1983 (Grizedale College) and PhD in 1987 in environmental sciences from the University of Lancaster, U.K. His doctoral advisor was Peter Young. He was a post-doctoral research associate at the Centre for Research on Environmental Systems, University of Lancaster, from 1987 to 1988.

== Academic career ==
After earning his doctorate degree, Ng returned to Hong Kong to teach. He began his academic career as a lecturer in the Department of Applied Science, City Polytechnic of Hong Kong (now known as City University of Hong Kong) in 1988.

In 1999, he joined the Department of Geography at the University of Hong Kong as an associate professor. Ng taught a variety of courses focused on environmental impact assessment (EIAs), nature conservation, sustainable development, and water governance. His course, "Hong Kong Environment: Issues and Policies," was one of the first university courses offered in Hong Kong that focused on environmental conservation and sustainability issues related to Hong Kong. In 2014, Ng was awarded the Long Service Award from the University of Hong Kong in recognition of teaching at the university for 15 years.

Ng's academic research projects focused on environmental impacts of urbanization, urban river basin study, and water governance. His work has been published in various international journals such as the International Journal of Water Resources Development, Science of the Total Environment and International Journal of Remote Sensing. He also frequently presented at international conferences, including the International Association for Impact Assessment, the Association of American Geographers and the Riversymposium.

Ng served as an Executive Council member for the Hong Kong Geographical Association for over ten years. He was also an advisor (2014-2019) to Our Hong Kong Foundation, where he advised on issues related to Hong Kong's land and housing supply. Ng was a frequent guest on RTHK, Commercial Radio Hong Kong, and other various Hong Kong broadcast media.

== KCRC Lok Ma Chau Spur Line Crisis (Long Valley Wetlands) ==
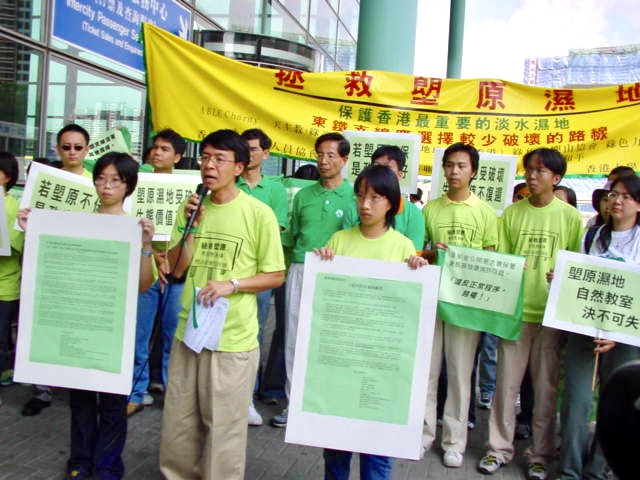
Ng Cho-nam leading the "Green Ribbon" campaign movement in Hong Kong on October 8, 2000

In 1999, Kowloon-Canton Railway Corporation proposed to construct a Lok Ma Chau spur line which would cut through the wetland of Long Valley, Hong Kong According to the Hong Kong Bird Watching Society, the construction of the spur line threatened to destroy habitat of over 210 avian species and 13 globally-threatened species.

Ng served as the spokesman for the coalition of Hong Kong green groups that were against the KCRC rail project. As the director of the Conservancy Association, Ng lobbied for international support for the "Save Long Valley" campaign and wrote many letters to various Hong Kong government officials urging them to scrap the proposed spur line, stating that the KCRC claims in its environmental assessment report were "flawed" and "contradictory." He conducted his own environmental field work and argued that there could be alternative ways to construct the spur line "without destroying the natural habitat and biodiversity at Long Valley." Ng also publicly expressed his concern of Long Valley in the RTHK radio program「香港家書」titled "Letter to Hong Kong" in June 2000.

On October 8, 2000, Ng organized the "Green Ribbon Campaign" at the Hung Hom KCRC station, outside of where the KCRC held a public exhibition to promote the construction of the Lok Ma Chau railway spur line. Various Hong Kong green groups, and local Hong Kong citizens, tied green ribbons at the KCRC's Hung Hom station to protest against the rail project.

The "Green Ribbon Campaign" and "Save Long Valley" campaign generated local and international media attention. Ng's contributions were reported in various news outlets such as Asiaweek , South China Morning Post , Sing Tao Daily , Ming Pao , Apple Daily and Oriental Daily News.

On October 16, 2000, the Hong Kong Environmental Protection Department (EPD) rejected the KCRC's Lok Ma Chau rail project. Time Magazine declared the HK EPD's decision to reject the rail project as one of the top five "best environmental news" of 2000, stating that it was "one of the few times the city has favored ecology over economy."

== Jockey Club Water Initiative on Sustainability and Engagement (JC-WISE) ==
Ng served as the co-investigator (with Frederick Lee, director of the Water Governance Research Program at the University of Hong Kong) at the Jockey Club Water Initiative on Sustainability and Engagement (JC-WISE) (Chinese:「賽馬會惜水‧識河計劃」), a water sustainability project funded by the Hong Kong Jockey Club Charities Trust (awarded HK$14.7 million grant) and hosted by the Faculty of Social Sciences, The University of Hong Kong. Launched in 2016, the project "aims to raise the public's awareness, and appreciation, of the importance of attaining long-term water sustainability goals for Hong Kong" through collaborations with the Hong Kong Geographical Association, the Hong Kong Bird Watching Society, and Green Power. In an interview for China Daily in 2017, Ng described the focus and goal of the JC-Wise project was to encourage the Hong Kong public to adopt a "river-friendly" culture mindset: "Every river has its own story. We'd like to reconnect the river with its community."

Under his leadership, the initiative organized school talks, field trips for local students, and hosted international conferences and public events such as "Water Fun Fest Day" to promote sustainability in the use of water resources in Hong Kong. JC-Wise created the first "Rivers@HK" database, an open-access and interactive GIS-based database on Hong Kong's rivers to "enhance the public's knowledge and appreciation of the multiple values of water." The initiative has also created Hong Kong's first Water Footprint Calculator, an interactive tool that allows the public to calculate the water footprint based on their choices of daily meals. Ng was also a key participant of the 2018 Hong Kong Biodiversity Festival (香港生物多樣性節), where he guided a public tour with Hong Kong Secretary of Environment Wong Kam-sing and members of the public to highlight ecology restoration of the Lam Tsuen River. JC-WISE's short documentary film, The Hidden Costs of Water, was awarded Merit - Special Mention from the Best Shorts Competition, Honorable Mention - Humanitarian Award from the Best Shorts Competition, and the Impact DOCS Awards in 2020.

== Sustainable revitalization of Lai Chi Wo ==
Ng also worked with Lam Chiu Ying on the ongoing sustainable rural revitalization of Lai Chi Wo, a 400-year old Hakka village in Hong Kong. The "Sustainable Lai Chi Wo" (永續荔枝窩計劃) program has received funding from HSBC and focuses on local implementation of the United Nations Sustainable Development Goals. The program is the "first cross-sector partnership of its kind implementing sustainability initiatives and innovation in farming, training, education and research" in Hong Kong. As Director of the Hong Kong Countryside Foundation (香港鄉郊基金有限公司), Ng introduced the idea to renovate the Lai Chi Wo village houses to promote eco-heritage tourism and cultural preservation of the Hakka village. The plan to revitalize Lai Chi Wo was initially met with some objections by local Hakka villagers "fearing commercialization and damage to nature and heritage." To address the villagers' concerns, Ng initiated numerous meetings with village representatives and villagers of Lai Chi Wo, Hong Kong government officials, and members of the "Sustainable Lai Chi Wo" project team, to explain to the villagers the project objectives as well as review and advise the land use of Lai Chi Wo regarding the Outline Zoning Plan.

The "Lai Chi Wo Hakka Life Experience Village" was launched in November 2017. The project earned "Special Recognition for Sustainable Development" in the 2020 UNESCO Asia-Pacific Awards for Cultural Heritage Conservation for its "pioneering approach to reviving a once-abandoned rural cultural landscape. The project was recognized for upholding "the key dimensions of sustainable development – economic, social and environmental – in undertaking the holistic rejuvenation of the historic Hakka agricultural settlement using nature-based solutions ... Through its multi-pronged strategy, the project transforms notions of heritage practice from its conventional focus on material conservation to encompass living heritage in all its manifestations. Drawing upon indigenous know-how, geomancy principles, and conservation science, the project demonstrates the importance of interweaving nature and cultural heritage in setting a new urban-rural sustainability agenda for Hong Kong SAR and beyond."

== Other conservation work and public service ==
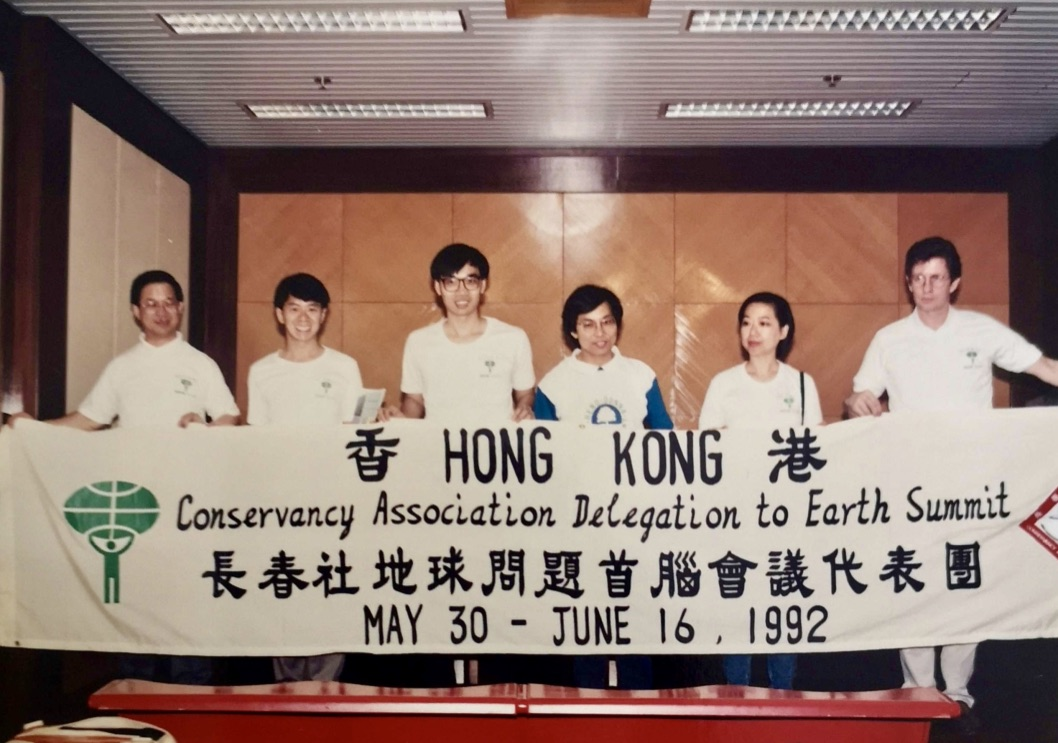
Ng Cho-nam (second left) with the other Hong Kong members of the Conservancy Association Delegation to Earth Summit in 1992

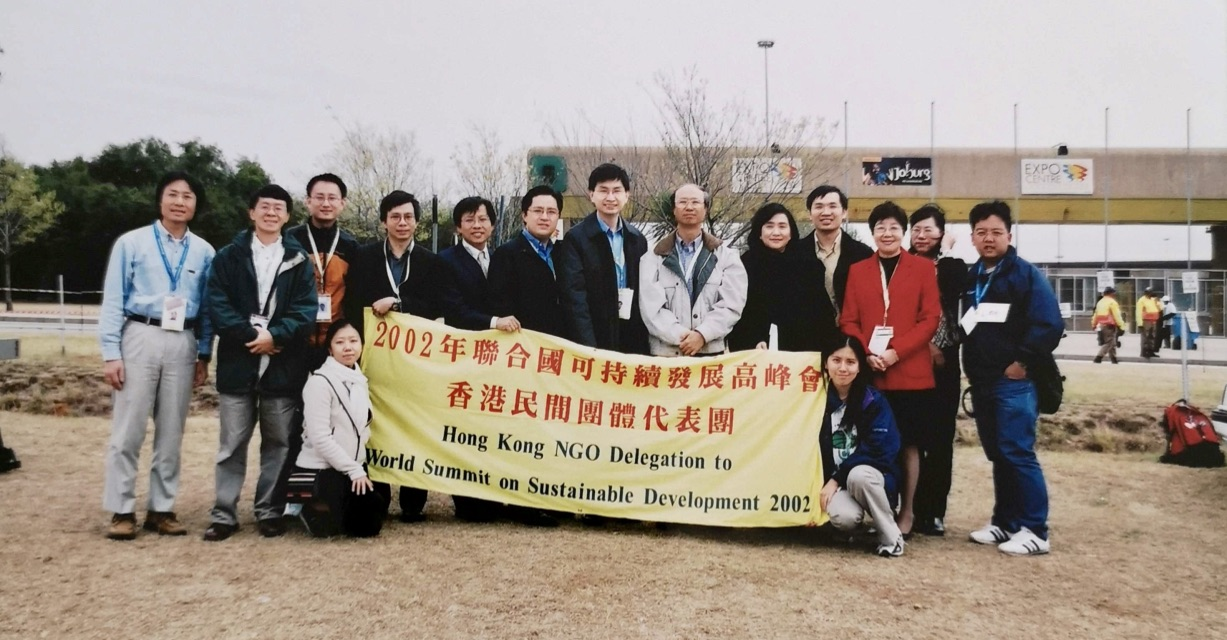
Ng Cho-nam (second left) with other members of the Hong Kong NGO Delegation for the 2002 World Summit on Sustainable Development

Ng was appointed to serve on numerous committees that advised the Hong Kong government on issues related to urban development, greening, heritage conservation, and sustainable development. His membership included the Town Planning Board, the Task Force on Land Supply (土地供應專責小組), the Country and Marine Parks Board (公園及海岸公園委員會), the Council for Sustainable Development (可持續發展委員會), the Advisory Council of the Environment (環境諮詢委員會), the Wetland Advisory Committee, the Antiquities Advisory Board, the Steering Committee on Biodiversity Strategy and Action Plan (生物多樣性策略及行動計劃), the Energy Advisory Committee (能源諮詢委員會), and the Advisory Committee on Water Resources and Quality of Water Supplies (水務諮詢委員會). Ng also served as an Honorary Adviser to the Fung Yuen Butterfly Reserve (大埔鳳園蝴蝶保育區).

In the early 2000s, Ng was a participant and organizer of the Woodrow Wilson International Center Environmental Change and Security Project's (ECSP) Green NGO and Environmental Journalist Forum. The forum discussed how to improve "the capacity of environmental NGOs and the quality of environmental reporting" in mainland China, Hong Kong and Taiwan. In 2001, Ng was interviewed on Public Radio International's program "Of Earth and Flesh: making your views known to Congress" to share how he "influenced the 'greening' of Hong Kong's public policy."

In 2012, Ng served as the environmental adviser for the election platform of former Hong Kong Chief Executive Leung Chun-ying. His decision to advise Leung was viewed by some as politically controversial, but Ng "believed the new leader could make a difference in environmental policy." Ng was awarded the Silver Bauhinia Star by Leung in 2014 for his "distinguished public and community service" and "exemplary efforts in serving on the Transport Advisory Committee and the County and Marine Parks Board."

=== Mai Po Wetlands ===
In the 1990s, as the Chairman of the Mai Po committee in WWF Hong Kong, Ng helped the Mai Po wetlands gain recognition as a "wetland of international importance" under the Ramsar Convention. Ng later served as the director of the Mai Po Nature Reserve and the Flyway Programme of WWF Hong Kong.

=== Hong Kong Bird Watching Society ===
According to Lam Chiu Ying, Ng travelled with him to China in the 1990s to watch birds, which sparked Ng's interest in taking up bird-watching as a life-time hobby. Ng became a Hong Kong Bird Watching Society Committee Member in 1994, and served as Vice-chairman from 2004 to 2019. In 2005, he helped set up BirdLife International HKBWS China Program, an organization focused on promoting bird watching and conservation in mainland China. He was a major supporter and active participant of the WWF Hong Kong "Big Bird Race", an annual event that promotes birdwatching in Hong Kong.

== Personal life ==
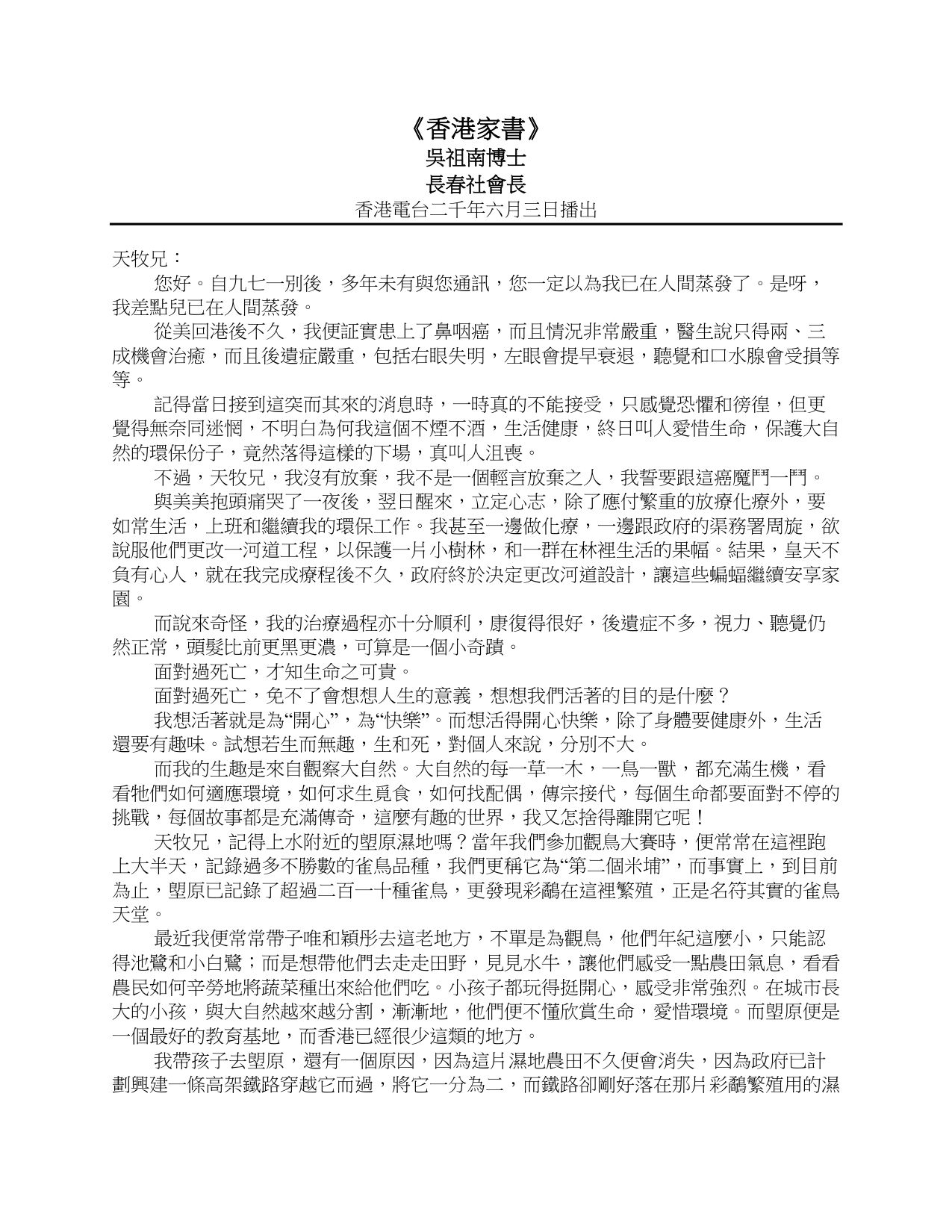
Ng Cho-nam's "Letter to Hong Kong" on June 3, 2000, Page 1

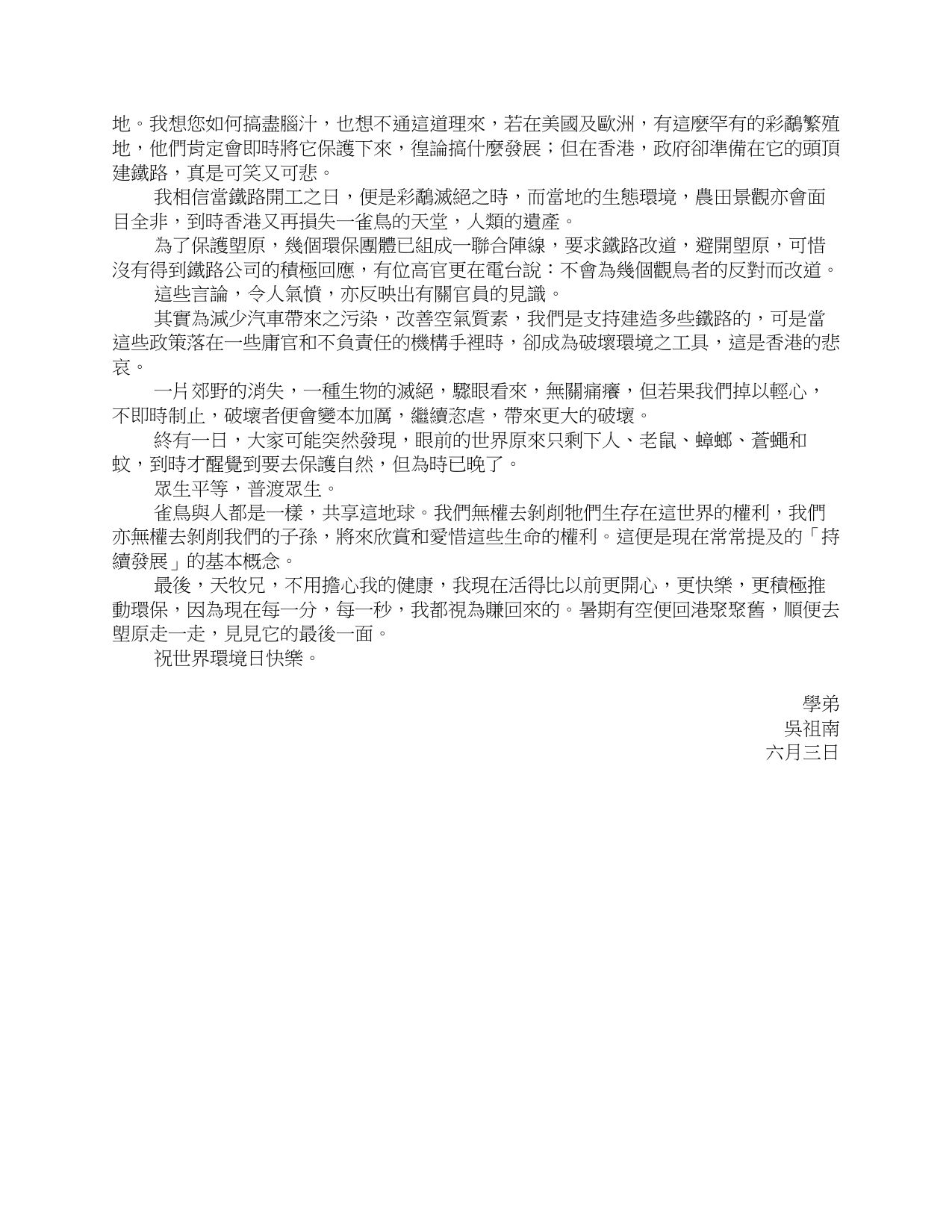
Ng Cho-nam's "Letter to Hong Kong" on June 3, 2000, Page 2

Ng and his wife, Pinky, raised two children. In 1997, he was diagnosed with advanced-stage nasopharyngeal cancer. Despite his battle with cancer, he continued to teach and serve as the spokesperson for the "Save Long Valley" wetlands campaign. On June 3, 2000, he read his personal essay titled "Letter to Hong Kong" on the RTHK radio program「香港家書」, stating that his "work and struggle" for the environment, specifically Long Valley, gave him "encouragement to fight against cancer."

Ng served as president of the Salesian English School Don Bosco Old Boys Association (Chinese: 慈幼英文學校鮑思高同學會) from 2018 to 2019. He also served as president of the University of Lancaster Hong Kong Alumni Association in 1989. He was awarded the "Dedicated Service Award" (Chinese: 優異服務獎章) from the Scout Association of Hong Kong in 2018.

Ng died on December 13, 2019, at the age of 59. Senior Hong Kong government officials issued the press release statement on the news of his death, stating "[We] are forever grateful for his valuable advice to the Government on issues relating to city planning and development, greening, nature and heritage conservation, and on promoting sustainable development in Hong Kong."

== Honors and awards ==
- 2014 Silver Bauhinia Star
- 2009 Justice of Peace
- 2004 Bronze Bauhinia Star

== Memorial prizes ==
In memory of Ng, the Department of Geography at the University of Hong Kong established the C.N. Ng Memorial Prize in Environmental Sustainability (Chinese: 吳祖南環境可持續發展紀念獎). The prize is awarded annually to one final year Geography student at the University of Hong Kong who has demonstrated excellence and future promise in the field of Geography and Environmental Sciences.

== Selected publications ==
- Xu, Q., Chen, J., Peart, M. R., Ng, C. N., Hau, B. C. H. and Law, W. W. Y. (2018) "Exploration of Severities of Rainfall and Runoff Extremes in Ungauged Catchments: A case study of Lai Chi Wo in Hong Kong, China." Science of the Total Environment 634: 640–649. doi: 10.1016/j.scitotenv.2018.04.024 PMID 29635206
- Xie, Y., Yu, X., Ng, C. N. and Fang, L. (2018) "Exploring the Dynamic Correlation of Landscape Composition and Habitat Fragmentation with Surface Water Quality in the Shenzhen River and Deep Bay cross-border watershed, China." Ecological Indicators 90: 231–246. doi: 10.1016/j.ecolind.2017.11.051
- Qi, X., Fu, Y., Wang, R. Y., Ng, C. N., Dang, H. and He, Y. (2018) "Improving the Sustainability of Agricultural Land use: An Integrated Framework for the conflict between Food Security and Environmental Deterioration." Applied Geography 90: 214–223. doi: 10.1016/j.apgeog.2017.12.009
- Wang, R. Y., Ng, C. N., Lenzer Jr, J. H., Dang, H. P., Liu, T. and Yao, S. J. (2016) "Unpacking Water Conflicts: A Reinterpretation of Coordination Problems in China's Water Governance System." International Journal of Water Resources Development 33(4): 553–569. doi: 10.1080/07900627.2016.1197824
- Wang, R. Y., Z. Si, C. N. Ng, and S. Scott (2015) "The transformation of trust in China's alternative food networks: disruption, reconstruction, and development." Ecology and Society 20(2): 19. doi: 10.5751/ES-07536-200219
- Ng, Cho-nam and Ting-Leung. 1992. "The Environment," in The Other Hong Kong Report-1992, edited by Joseph Y.S. Cheng and Paul C.K. Kwong, pp. 365–382. Hong Kong: The Chinese University Press.
