= Long Valley, Hong Kong =

Coordinates: 22.5091°N 114.1143°E

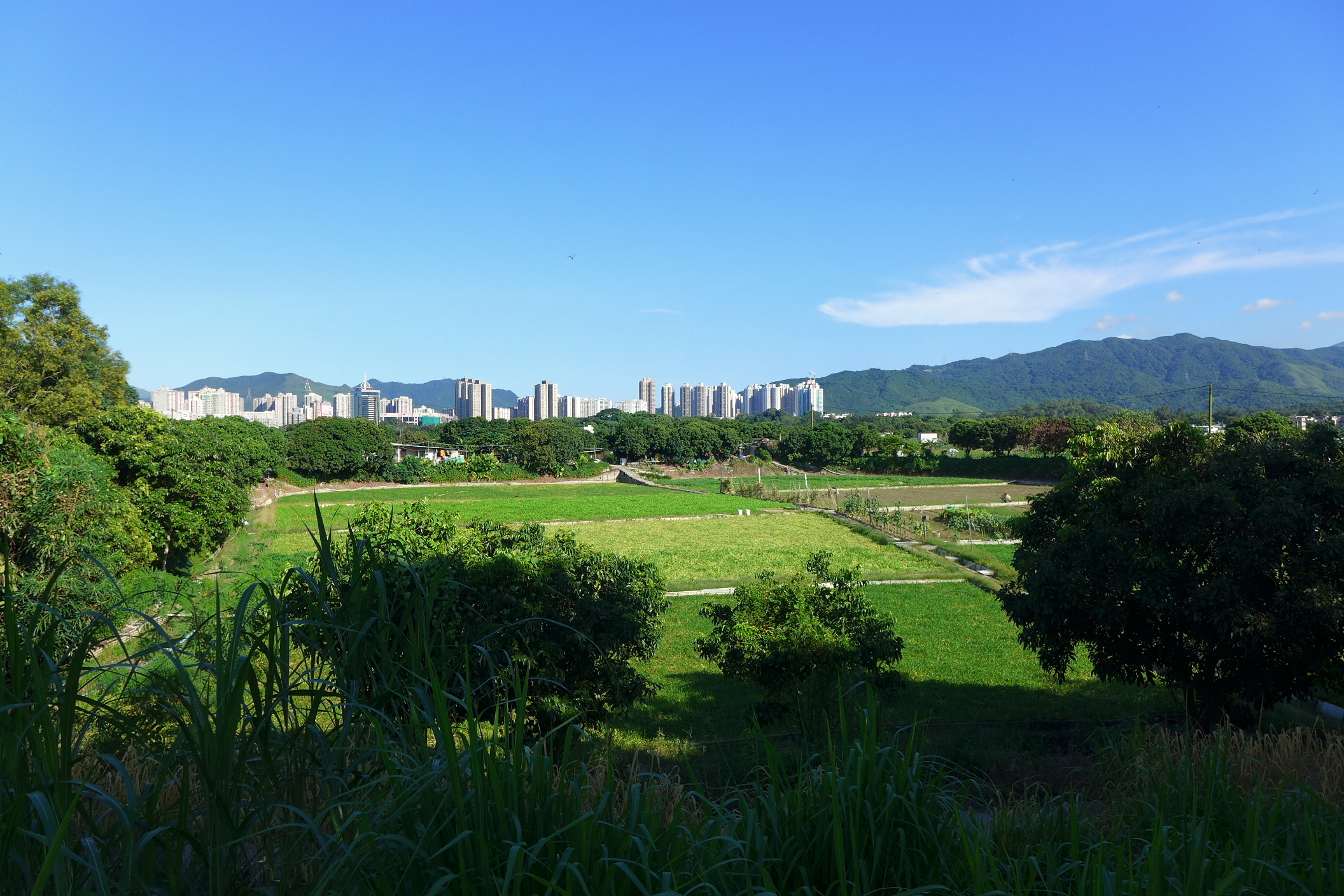
Long Valley, Hong Kong

Long Valley (Chinese: 塱原) is a wetland in Sheung Shui of the New Territories in Hong Kong. The wetland was originally formed by the rice paddies between Shek Sheung River and Sheung Yue River. It is the last agricultural wetland in Hong Kong.

Long Valley became notable in Hong Kong when the Kowloon–Canton Railway proposed building the Lok Ma Chau Spur Line across it. This proposal aroused great concern from the Conservancy Association, and other Hong Kong environmental groups that the construction would greatly affect the habitats of the wetland, including waterfowl and water levels. The Conservancy Association launched the "Save Long Valley" campaign and wrote many letters to various Hong Kong government officials urging them to scrap the proposed spur line. Several methods thereafter proposed included a flyover or a tunnel under the wetland. The KCR initially adopted a hostile, non-conciliatory attitude towards environmentalist demands and eventually changed course after failing to get a permit from the Environmental Protection Department. It was finally decided to tunnel under the wetland at great cost.

During the process of public discussion, private land owners strongly criticized environmental groups, whom they feared could threaten their personal interests. Local farmers and tenants, however, feared for the loss of their own means of income and lifestyle, despite their age.

Subsequent to the revised proposal several key projects were initiated to improve the quality of Long Valley. Among these The Conservancy Association (https://www.cahk.org.hk/) began a sustainable development project that would unify social, economic and environmental concerns. These included helping farmers shift from traditional farming practices to organic farming, organizing ecotours to educate the public about Long Valley and restoring abandoned lands to various types of wetlands.

== Notable people ==
- Lam Chiu Ying, S.B.S, Chairman, Hong Kong Bird Watching Society
- Dr. Ng Cho-nam, S.B.S, J.P, former Director of The Conservancy Association
- Mike Kilburn, former Chairman of the conservation committee, Hong Kong Bird Watching Society

== See also ==
- Sheung Shui
- North District
- Wetland
- New Territories
- Hong Kong Bird Watching Society
- Conservancy Association
- Kowloon-Canton Railway
