= Ma Lin =

Ma Lin may refer to:

- Ma Lin (painter) (13th century), Song dynasty Chinese painter
- Ma Lin (warlord) (1873–1945), Chinese warlord, Chairman of Qinghai (1931–1938)
- Ma Lin (biochemist) (1924–2017), Vice-Chancellor of the Chinese University of Hong Kong
- Ma Lin (footballer) (born 1962), Chinese football player and team manager
- Ma Lin (table tennis) (born 1980), Chinese table tennis player
- Ma Lin (Paralympic table tennis) (born 1989), Chinese/Australian Paralympic table tennis player
- Ma Lin (Water Margin), fictional character in the Water Margin
