= Margaret Leung =

Margaret Leung Ko May-yee, SBS, JP (Chinese: 梁高美懿; born 1952 in Hong Kong) is a non-official member of the Executive Council of Hong Kong. She was previously the deputy chairman and managing director of Chong Hing Bank Limited and vice-chairman and chief executive officer of Hang Seng Bank Limited. And before that she was the group general manager and Global Co-head of commercial banking of HSBC.

== Biography ==
- 1952: Born in Hong Kong
- 1978: Graduated from the University of Hong Kong in Economics, Accounting and Business Administration
- 1981: Joined HSBC
- 2005: Appointed to Group general manager and Global Co-head of Commercial banking of HSBC
- 2009: Appointed to vice-chairman and chief executive officer of Hang Seng Bank, replacing Raymond Or
- 2014: Appointed to Deputy chairman and managing director of Chong Hing Bank Limited.
- 2022: Appointed the non-official member of the Executive Council of Hong Kong

Leung declared herself as a member of the Hong Kong Golf Club on 17 August 2022, adding it after her initial declaration of interests.

== See also ==
- Women in business
