= Gordon Fung Siu-yuen =

Gordon Fung Siu-yuen is a retired Hong Kong police officer. He was awarded the Silver Bauhinia Star in recognition of his long and exemplary service to the Government of Hong Kong.

Gordon Fung Siu-yuen served on the Hong Kong Police Force for 36 years. He retired in 2008 as the Deputy Police Commissioner & Director of Management Services.
