= Tsui Shung-yiu =

Tsui Shung-yiu is a former director of the Hong Kong Marine Department.

He was awarded the Silver Bauhinia Star in 2006. Tsui retired as director after 28 years with the government. He was a member of the marine and naval architecture discipline advisory panel of the HKIE (Hong Kong Institute of Engineers). He was part of a high-level delegation to promote Hong Kong's maritime services at the Posidonia 2002 International Shipping Exhibition in Greece in June 2002.

He is currently a consultant to Shun Tak-China Travel Ship Management.
