= Lessie Wei =

Hong Kong civil servant

- Traditional Chinese: 韋徐潔儀
- Simplified Chinese: 韦徐洁仪
Transcriptions
Standard Mandarin
- Hanyu Pinyin: Wéi Xú Jiéyí
Yue: Cantonese
- Jyutping: wai4 ceoi4 git3 ji4

Lessie Wei Chui Kit-yee (Chinese: 韋徐潔儀) is a retired Hong Kong civil servant and Silver Bauhinia Star awardee for her contributions in 2001. Wei is also a Justice of the Peace.

== Career ==
Wei joined the Hong Kong Government in May 1970, one year after graduating from university. Wei was a member of the Trade Officer Grade for 13 years before becoming an Administrative Officer Staff Grade C in 1983. In March 1997, Wei took the position of Director of Agriculture, Fisheries and Conservation. Wei rose to her highest rank of Administrative Officer Staff Grade A, as of January 1, 2000. On January 14, 2002, she went on pre-retirement leave and was succeeded by Thomas Chan Chun-yuen.

== Background ==
Wei served in various bureaus and departments, including the former Trade Department, Security Branch, the former Urban Services Department, the then Chief Secretary's Office and the Financial Services Branch. Wei has held the following positions:

- Deputy Director of Urban Services from February 1990 to January 1991
- Deputy Director of Administration from January 1991 to September 1994
- Deputy Secretary for Financial Services from October 1994 to March 1997.
- Director of Agriculture and Fisheries (later renamed Director of Agriculture, Fisheries and Conservation)
