= Hong Kong Herbarium =

The Hong Kong Herbarium (Chinese: 香港植物標本室) is a herbarium in Hong Kong, managed by the Agriculture, Fisheries and Conservation Department.

The Hong Kong Herbarium was established in 1878. It has a collection of about 48,000 plant specimens and is responsible for the systematic collection, identification and curation of specimens representative of the Hong Kong flora.
