= Neil Trevor Kaplan =

British lawyer and judge

Neil Trevor Kaplan CBE KC JP SBS

Judge of the Supreme Court of Hong Kong
- In office 1990–1994

Personal details
- Born: 1942 (age 83–84)

Neil Trevor Kaplan is an international arbitrator, licensed to practise law in Hong Kong, Australia and New York. He is currently an international arbitrator at Arbitration Chambers Hong Kong, and has been described as the "Father of Hong Kong Arbitration". Chambers and Partners ranks Kaplan as one of the Most In Demand Arbitrators in Global Market (Band 1).

== Education ==
Born in 1942, Kaplan attended St Paul's School, London (1956–1961) and King's College London (1961–1964) earning his Bachelor of Laws degree in 1964.

In 1965 he was called to the Bar of England and Wales, where he practised in London until 1980, when he was named Deputy Principal Crown Counsel at the Attorney General's Chambers (Hong Kong), specialising in civil litigation. Two years later he took silk as Queen's Counsel for Hong Kong and became Principal Crown Counsel. Two years later, in 1984, he founded and became the first Head of Des Voeux Chambers, a leading barristers' chambers in Hong Kong.

In 1983, he was admitted to practise as a barrister and solicitor in Victoria, Australia. In 1986, he was admitted to the Bar in New York State.

From 1984 to 1989 (with a brief break), Kaplan chaired the Hong Kong branch of the Chartered Institute of Arbitrators. He later became Overseas Vice-president of the institute, and finally President in 1999–2000.

From 1990 to 1994, he served as a High Court Judge in Charge of the Construction and Arbitration List in Hong Kong. From 1991 until 2004, he was Chairman of the Hong Kong International Arbitration Centre, of which he is a founder. In 1995 he became a member of the International Council for Commercial Arbitration (ICCA) and is now a Governing Board member. From 1999 to 2004 he chaired the WTO Review Panel for Hong Kong.

In the 2001 Birthday Honours, Kaplan was awarded a CBE for services to international arbitration. In 2007, he was awarded the Silver Bauhinia Star by the Chief Executive of Hong Kong.

Kaplan is the author of numerous articles, speeches, and books on international arbitration.

== Fellowships ==
- Fellow of the Chartered Institute of Arbitrators
- Fellow of the Singapore Institute of Arbitrators
- Fellow of the Hong Kong Institute of Arbitrators
