= James Hughes-Hallett =

British businessperson and investor (1949–2019)

James Hughes-Hallett CMG SBS
- Born: 10 September 1949
- Died: 12 October 2019 (aged 70)
- Education: Eton College; Merton College, Oxford.

James Wyndham John Hughes-Hallett, CMG, SBS (10 September 1949 – 12 October 2019) was a British businessman and investor. He was Chairman of the Swire Group between 2005 and 2015. His sister is the author Lucy Hughes-Hallett. Hughes-Hallett died on 12 October 2019, at the age of 70.

== Career ==
Hughes-Hallett was educated at Eton College and Merton College, Oxford.

He began his career as an articled clerk with Dixon Wilson Tubbs & Gillett (1970–73). He worked with the Swire Group (since 1976) and held the following positions.

- Chairman, Swire Pacific Ltd (1999–2005)
- Chairman, John Swire & Sons (Hong Kong) Ltd (1999–2005)
- Chairman, John Swire & Sons Ltd (2005–2015)
- Non-executive director, John Swire & Sons Ltd (2015–2019)

He was also Chairman, Cathay Pacific Ltd (1999–2005) and Director, HSBC Holdings Ltd (2005–2014).

== Honours ==
- FCA
- Companion of the Order of St Michael and St George (CMG)
- Silver Bauhinia Star

== Other ==
- Trustee, Dulwich Picture Gallery (2005–2019)
- Esmée Fairbairn Foundation (Chairman, 2005–2019)
- Governor, SOAS (2005–2010)
- Governor, Courtauld Institute of Art (2008–2019)
