= Li Choh-ming =

Chinese-born American economist and educator

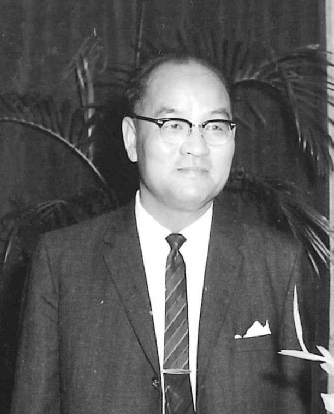
Li in 1963

Li Choh-ming (李卓敏, 1912 – 1991) was a Chinese-born American economist and educator. He was the founding Vice-Chancellor of the Chinese University of Hong Kong in 1963. He compiled The Li Chinese Dictionary (Cantonese-Mandarin). He was an economics professor at the University of California, Berkeley and at Nankai University in Tianjin during his academic career.

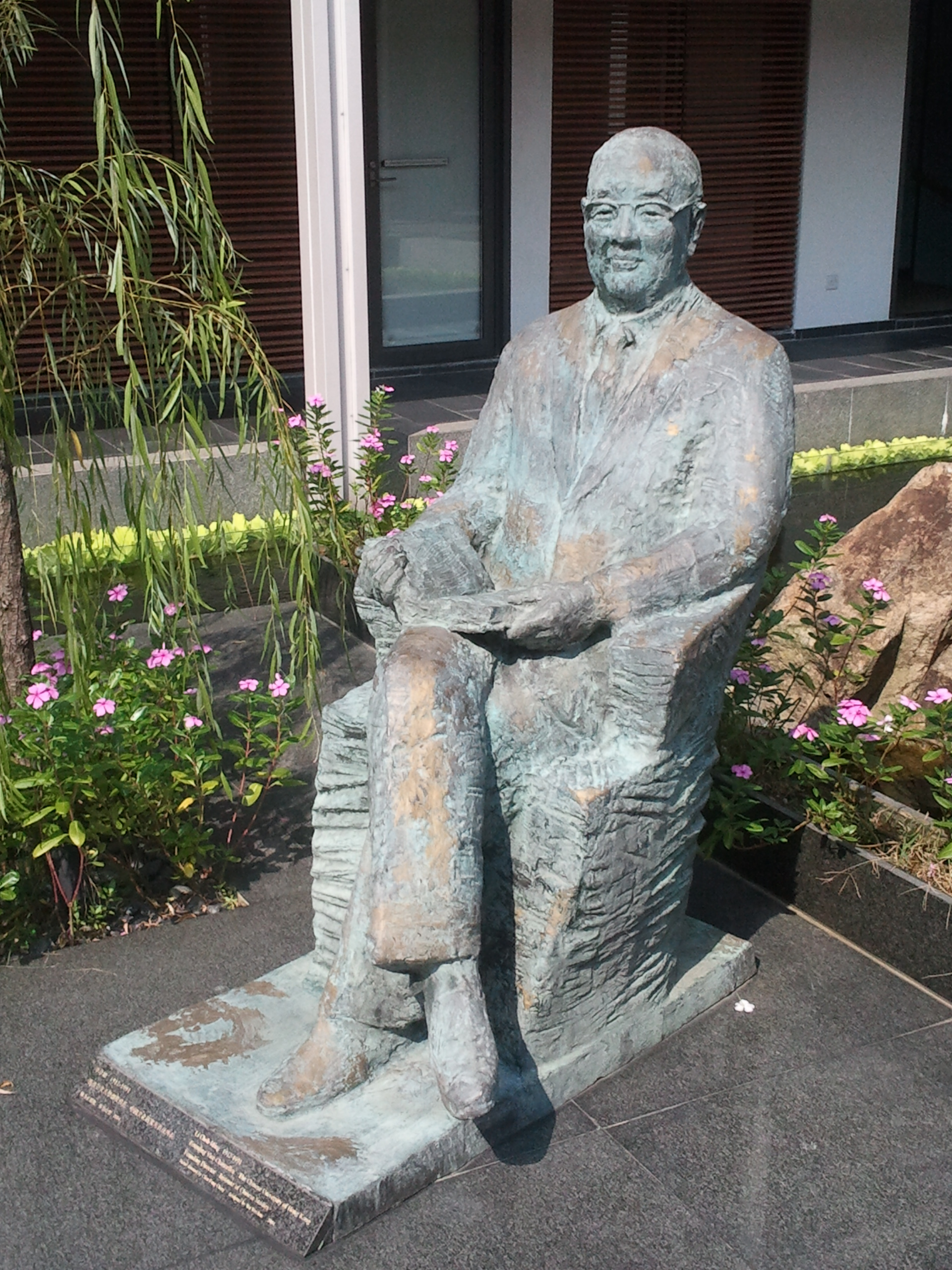
Li's statue in CUHK Institute of Chinese Studies

== Career ==
Born in Canton, China in 1912 to Li Kanchi and Li Mewshing, Li Choh-Ming was the third child and the eldest son in a family of 11 children. He graduated from Puiying High School in Canton before heading off to the U.S. at the University of California, Berkeley where he earned his B.S. in commerce (1932), M.A. (1933) and Ph.D. in economics (1936). Eventually, three of his brothers Choh-Hao, Choh-Hsien, Choh-Luh and a sister, Djoh-i, came from China to study various sciences at U.C. Berkeley.

Li returned to China to teach economics at Nankai University in Tianjin in 1937. From 1938-1943, Li taught at the National Southwest Associated University (Lianda) when the top three universities in China (Tsinghua, Peking, Nankai) consolidated into one, moving to Kunming and Chongqing as the Sino-Japanese war broke. Li was among the key economists to bring Western economic ideas into China, both in teaching and serving as China's representative at various international missions. In 1945-47 Li was named Deputy Director-General of the Chinese National Relief and Rehabilitation Administration (CNRRA)in Shanghai, to work with the United Nations (UNRRA) in managing the postwar relief and recovery effort in China. As the war ended, Li became China's permanent delegate to the United Nations Economic Commission for Asia and the Far East (ECAFE) in 1948-49 and Chairman of the Board of Trustees for Rehabilitation Affairs (BOTRA) 1949-50 to help reconstruct China with long-term economic development.

In 1951 Li immigrated to the U.S. where he began as a lecturer in economics, becoming professor of business administration in 1958, and Chairman of the Center for Chinese Studies (1961) at his alma mater, the University of California-Berkeley. Upon becoming a U.S. citizen, Li was able to bring his wife Sylvia and family of 2 sons, Winston and Tony, and a daughter Jeannie, to the U.S. from Hong Kong in 1955.

== Writing ==
His scholarly contributions focused on the economic system of Communist China and its performance. His books, the Economic Development of Communist China (1959) and The Statistical System of Communist China (1962) were seminal works before China sealed itself off from outsiders. Li's continuous study of social and economic problems of China helped establish UC-Berkeley as a center for scholarly research on China. His expertise in international trade and economics helped establish international business in the School of Business Administration curricula.

In 1963 the Government of Hong Kong appointed Li Choh-Ming to head the Chinese University of Hong Kong. With government backing of the U.K. and the U.S., the Board of Regents of the University of California granted him an unprecedented 10-year leave of absence to form and establish the new university. As head, Li was named Vice-Chancellor of the university (in the British tradition, the Governor of Hong Kong was the Chancellor of all Hong Kong colleges and universities). The new university was founded with the motto "to combine tradition and modernity and to bring together China and the West" by adding the Chinese dimension or data into every academic discipline. From the beginning, English, Cantonese, and Mandarin were the languages of instruction. Student and faculty exchanges with the U.S., the U.K., and other countries were established. He wrote and oversaw The CUHK publications on the formation and development of the university: The First Six Years 1963-69 (1971), The Emerging University (1975), and A New Era Begins (1979). Li retired from The CUHK in 1978. Li was Professor Emeritus at Berkeley in 1973. Throughout his tenure at The CUHK, Li personally compiled and developed a pictophonetic Cantonese-Mandarin dictionary. He called his new system of codifying Chinese characters the Fan System. The Li Chinese Dictionary (李氏中文字典, Li shi zhong wen zi dian) was published and distributed in the West and in the People's Republic of China in 1981.

Li Choh-Ming received many honors from around the world. Among them were honorary knighthoods, the Commander of the Order of the British Empire (CBE) in 1967 and Knight Commander of the Order of the British Empire (KBE) in 1973. At The Chinese University of Hong Kong, the medical building is named after him and a life size statue of him sits at the Institute of Chinese Studies. From the University of California, he received the Elise and Walter A. Haas International Award (1974) and the Clark Kerr Award (1979).

Academic offices
Preceded by Yung Chi-tung (Pro-Vice-Chancellor acting as Vice-Chancellor)	Vice-Chancellor of the Chinese University of Hong Kong; 1964–1978	Succeeded by Ma Lin
