= Agriculture, Fisheries and Conservation Department =

Hong Kong government department

- 漁農自然護理署

Agency overview
- Headquarters: 5/F, Cheung Sha Wan Government Offices, 303 Cheung Sha Wan Road, Kowloon
- Employees: 1,830
- Annual budget: HK$897.5m (2008-09)
- Agency executives: Leung Siu-fai, Director of Agriculture, Fisheries and Conservation; So Ping-man, Deputy Director of Agriculture, Fisheries and Conservation
- Parent agency: Environment and Ecology Bureau
- Website: www.afcd.gov.hk

Agriculture, Fisheries and Conservation Department
- Traditional Chinese: 漁農自然護理署
- Simplified Chinese: 渔农自然护理署
Transcriptions
Standard Mandarin
- Hanyu Pinyin: Yú Nóng Zìrán Hùlǐ Shǔ
Yue: Cantonese
- Jyutping: jyu4 nung4 zi6 jin4 wu6 lei5 cyu5

Agriculture and Fisheries Department
- Traditional Chinese: 漁農署
- Simplified Chinese: 渔农署
Transcriptions
Standard Mandarin
- Hanyu Pinyin: Yú Nóng Shǔ
Yue: Cantonese
- Jyutping: jyu4 nung4 cyu5

The Agriculture, Fisheries and Conservation Department (Chinese: 漁農自然護理署; formerly the Agriculture and Fisheries Department (漁農署) before 2000, of the Hong Kong Government is responsible for agriculture and fisheries in Hong Kong, conservation projects and issues, and managing the country parks and special areas.

It currently reports to the Environment and Ecology Bureau, though previously it was under the Secretary for Food and Health from 2007 to 2022, Secretary for Health, Welfare and Food and Secretary for the Environment, Transport and Works, and before 2000, the Secretary for Economic Services. The department is also responsible for issuing special, transshipment and pet import permits for pet animals, plants to be transshipped through or imported into Hong Kong.

== History ==
The name and remit of the department was previously:

- 1946-1950 - Agriculture Department
- 1950-1960 - Department of Agriculture, Fisheries, and Forestry
- 1960-1964 - Agriculture and Forestry Department
- 1964-1973 - Agriculture and Fisheries Department

== Director ==
The department is headed by the Director of Agriculture, Fisheries and Conservation (titled Director of Agriculture and Fisheries before 2000). The current director is Dr Leung Siu-fai.

=== List of directors ===
- Jack Cater (1964–1965)
- Edward Hewitt Nichols (Apr 1966 to Jan 1980)
- Dr John Morrison Riddell-Swan (Mar 1980 to 1985 or later)
- Lessie Wei (1997 to 2002)
- Alan Wong Chi-kong (17 Aug 2009 - 25 July 2015)
- Dr Leung Siu-fai (July 2015 to present)

== History ==
In January 2022, the AFCD banned the importation of hamsters after some were infected with COVID-19; in January 2023, the AFCD lifted the ban, but required that imported hamsters test negative for the virus.

== See also ==
- Agriculture and aquaculture in Hong Kong
- Fish Marketing Organisation
- Hong Kong Herbarium
