= Raymond Or =

Hong Kong businessman

- Or Ching-fai Chinese: 柯清輝
- Born: 1949 (age 76–77); Xiamen, Fujian Province, China
- Education: University of Hong Kong
- Occupation: Banker

Raymond Or Ching-fai (Chinese: 柯清輝), SBS, JP (born 1949 in Xiamen, Fujian, China) is the Vice-Chairman of G-Resources Group (SEHK: 1051 and the Vice-Chairman and chief executive officer of China Strategic Group (SEHK: 235), and the chairman of Esprit Holdings.

He was the vice-chairman and chief executive officer of Hang Seng Bank, from which he retired in May 2009, and was succeeded by Margaret Leung Ko May-yee.

== Early life ==
In 1949, Or was born in Xiamen, Fujian Province, China. In 1956, Or emigrated to Hong Kong.

== Education ==
In 1972, Or graduated with a Bachelor of Social Sciences degree in Economics and Psychology from the University of Hong Kong.

== Career ==
In 1972, Or started working at HSBC. In 1980, Or was promoted to Credit Manager in Corporate Banking Division at HSBC. In 1995, Or was promoted to Assistant General Manager and Head of Corporate and Institutional Banking at HSBC. In 2000, Or was appointed to General Manager and then Group General Manager at HSBC.

In 2005, Or was appointed to vice-chairman and Chief Executive of Hang Seng Bank. In 2009, Or retired from Hang Seng Bank.
