= Hong Kong Geographical Association =

Geographical society

- 香港地理學會
- Dissolved: 1969
- Members: 300+
- Chair: Cheng, Nga Yee Irene
- Vice-chair: Lai, Yuk Fo Derrick
- Affiliations: International Geographical Union
- Website: Official website

Hong Kong Geographical Association
- Traditional Chinese: 香港地理學會
Transcriptions
Yue: Cantonese
- Yale Romanization: Hēung góng déi léih hohk wúih
- Jyutping: Hoeng1 gong2 dei2 lei5 hok6 wui5

The Hong Kong Geographical Association (HKGA) exists to promote interest in, stimulate the teaching of, and research in geography.

The association publishes the Hong Kong Geographer and also organizes various conferences, talks, and workshops regularly. In the year 2012–2013, it had more than 300 members.

== Leadership ==
The current chairperson of the executive committee is Dr. Nga Yee Irene Cheng, from the Science and Environmental Studies Department of the Education University of Hong Kong.

The immediate past chairman is Prof. Jiang Xu, from the Department of Geography and Resource Management, the Chinese University of Hong Kong.
