= Patrick Lau Lai-chiu =

Patrick Lau Lai-chiu SBS, JP (劉勵超; born 1950/51) is a former career civil servant in the Hong Kong Government. He retired in 2007 as Director of Lands, head of the Lands Department.

Lau joined the civil service in 1972, spending 15 years in the Trade Department, followed by positions in the Industry Department, the Hong Kong Government Office in London, the City and New Territories Administration, the Administrative Services and Information Branch, Hong Kong Economic and Trade Office in Washington, and the Civil Service Branch.

Lau was Deputy Secretary for the Civil Service (1995-1997), Deputy Secretary for Planning, Environment and Lands (1997-2001), and Deputy Head of the Central Policy Unit (March 2001 to May 2002).

He became Director of the Lands Department in May 2002 and held the post until his retirement in June 2007.

== Current positions ==
He continues to hold senior positions on public bodies, including:

- Board member of Hong Kong Countryside Foundation
- Audit Committee of the Hong Kong Housing Society.
- Member of the Hong Kong Ideas Centre
- Member of the Land Resumption and Compensation Committee of the Urban Renewal Authority

== Public statements ==
In 2012, he drew praise for his proposed solution to the controversial issue of (the many) illegal structures that had been added to properties, notably in the New Territories. He suggested that owners pay a one-off fine, according to the area of the addition, which they could then legally retain. The idea was rejected by Secretary for Development Carrie Lam.
