= Lam Chiu Ying =

Hong Kong meteorologist and conservationist

Lam Chiu Ying 林超英 SBS
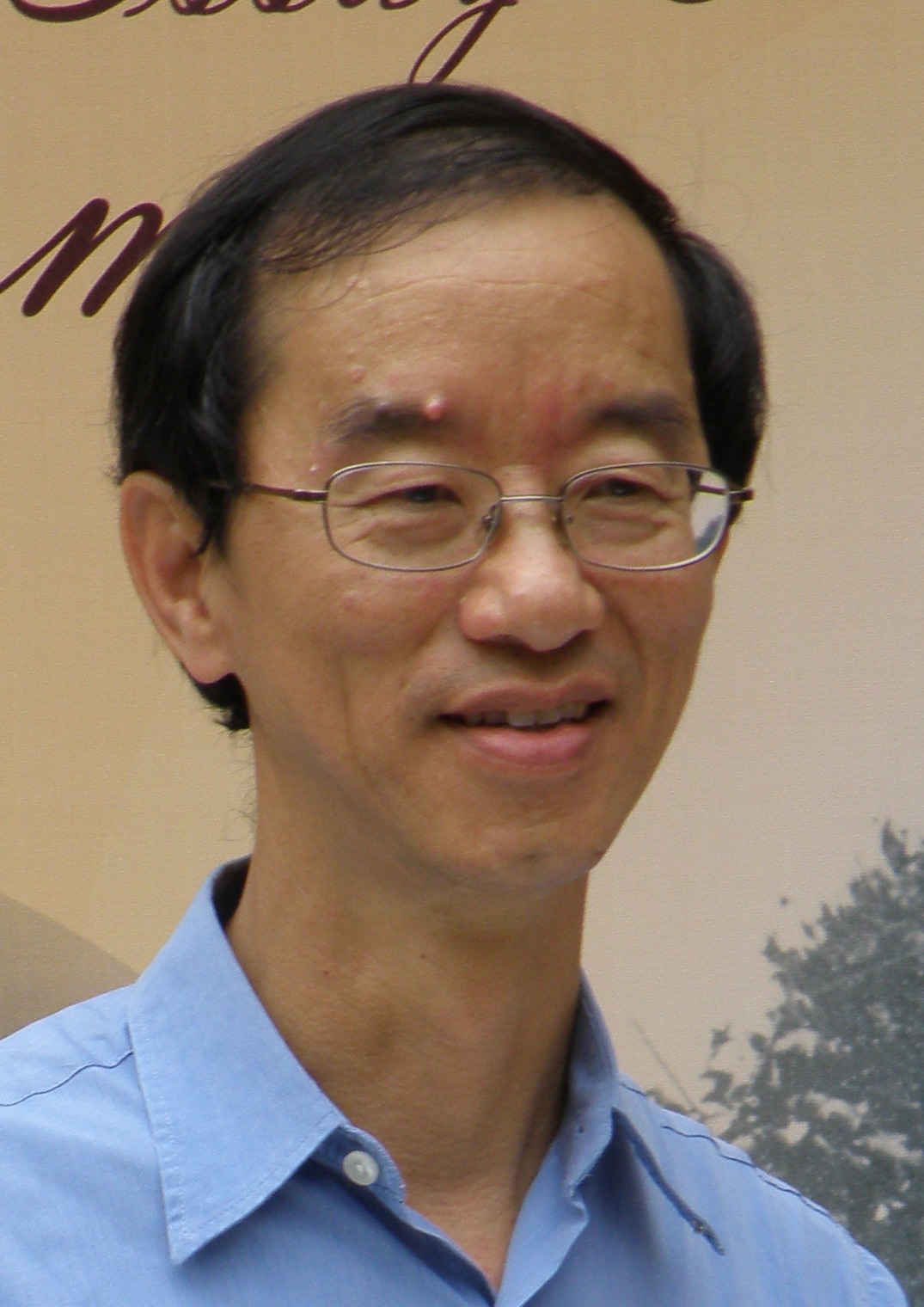
- Lam Chiu-ying, in 2009.

Director of the Hong Kong Observatory
- In office 14 March 2003 – 6 April 2009
- Preceded by: Lam Hung-kwan
- Succeeded by: Lee Boon Ying

Assistant Director of the Hong Kong Observatory
- In office July 1992 – 14 March 2003

Personal details
- Born: 1949 (age 76–77)
- Education: King's College, Hong Kong; University of Hong Kong; Imperial College London; Princeton University
- Profession: meteorologist, civil servant

Lam Chiu Ying
- Traditional Chinese: 林超英
- Simplified Chinese: 林超英
Transcriptions
Standard Mandarin
- Hanyu Pinyin: Lín Chāoyīng

Lam Chiu-ying SBS (Chinese: 林超英; Cantonese Yale: làhm chīu yīng; pinyin: Lín Chāoyīng), also known by the nickname 'Black Ying' (Chinese: 黑英; pinyin: Hēi Yīng), is a Hong Kong meteorologist, bird-watcher, conservationist and blogger. He was the director of the Hong Kong Observatory 2003 through 2009. He is also an honorary fellow of the Royal Meteorological Society, an honorary university fellow of the University of Hong Kong, as well as the honorary president of the Hong Kong Bird Watching Society. Microplanet 64288 Lamchiuying is named after Lam.

== Biography ==
=== Youth ===
Lam was first interested in astronomy as a Primary 6 student. In Form 2, he decided that he wanted to enter the Hong Kong Observatory while completing a stargazing Boy Scout badge, although he later believed that the chances were slim. He obtained an A in Physics in the Hong Kong Certificate of Education Examination, although the grade was not sustained in the A-levels, where he received an A for all other subjects he took up.

He studied mathematics and physics at the University of Hong Kong. He received a Commonwealth scholarship and went to Imperial College London, where he studied meteorology instead of physics for the fear that physics would lead to wars. After a few months, he decided to go to the United States. The lecturer wrote him a letter of recommendation, saying that he was his best post-war student. However, he had only studied at Princeton University for three weeks before dropping out, saying that he wanted to get a job instead of studying theories.

Lam said in an interview by the Wen Wei Po that his interest in bird-watching started when he saw birds in the Hong Kong Cemetery at Happy Valley when he was in his twenties.

=== Observatory ===
Lam joined the Royal Observatory Hong Kong as a Scientific Officer on 4 May 1974. After being promoted to Senior Scientific Officer in October 1980, he went on to become the Assistant Director in July 1992.

Lam became the director of the Hong Kong Observatory in March 2003. He has promoted a 'family-friendly' workspace for employees, encouraged employees to go home on time and organised activities where the family of employees could also participate.

In 2006, Typhoon Prapiroon hit Hong Kong. The Observatory did not hoist a Typhoon Signal No. 8. Some criticised this decision as being against the usual practice of the Observatory, while an astronomer criticised the Observatory's warning system, saying that the Observatory should also have taken into account the wind speed of the New Territories and outlying islands. The Office of the Ombudsman received 140 complaints. Some even urged him to resign. Lam defended the decision but altered the typhoon warning system.

In July 2007, Lam fell from a horse in Mongolia and was seriously injured. He received a brain operation in September. In July 2008, another incident occurred and he had to be hospitalised for a week.

Soon after, Typhoon Nuri hit Hong Kong. The Observatory was criticised for hoisting a Typhoon Signal No. 8, which some considered unnecessary, and hoisting it too late. There was also confusion regarding the Chinese word '清晨', which Lam later explained. Lam denied that the Observatory had underestimated the strength of the typhoon. In response to claims that Typhoon Signal No. 8, Lam stated that at least two people had been killed by the typhoon. He also stated that Hong Kong had been 'incredibly lucky' that the destructive power of the typhoon was not as strong as predicted.

Lam turned sixty in 2009. After six years as the Director, he retired. His pre-retirement leave started on 6 April, and his successor, Lee Boon Ying, was appointed 8 May. He said that he would not do any work for pay after retirement, but would continue to accept invitations to share his ideas.

=== Retired life ===
In January 2010, Lam criticised the government in his blog for endorsing the building of houses in Long Valley by 'influential people' using the name of 'diversified development'. As a result, a legislator wrote to Carrie Lam seeking explanation. Carrie Lam ordered the Planning Department to contact him. On 4 February, Lam sent his position paper to departments of the Development Bureau as a resident, detailing arguments for the preservation of the Valley and raising questions about the government being 'soft' on 'influential people'. Carrie Lam dismissed it as 'absurd', while the Department implied that at least twenty out of eighty hectares of the Valley were used for building.

Lam also hosted the Radio Television Hong Kong Channel 1 show Sentient Beings from 3 July 2010 to 25 December of the same year. He is also an honorary fellow of the University of Hong Kong and lectures at the Geography and Resource Management Department of the Chinese University of Hong Kong.

In November 2010, Lam criticised the government's policy to cut classes in his blog. As the president of the King's College Old Boy's Association, he wrote that the government was cutting back the opportunity for upward social mobility of students from grassroots families. Michael Suen, the Secretary for Education, replied that the chances would not be reduced as the total number of students were on a decreasing trend.

== Conservation ==
Lam had been dismissive of man-made climate change until 2001, when he read the Third Assessment Report on global warming from IPCC publishings. In 2009, Lam, along with noted singer and environmental activist Lowell Lo, hosted '救亡16度', a documentary about global warming, for RoadShow. Since retirement, Lam has given talks about the climate. As of August 2010, Lam has given 130 talks and 40 interviews.

In 2013, Lam spoke out strongly against proposals to use country park land for housing.

Lam also advocates against the use of air conditioners, due to their high electricity usage and release of chemicals into the environment, both of which contribute to global warming. According to Lam in 2022, he has "not switched on the air-conditioner [for himself] for something like 10 years." Lam instead promotes the use of USB-charging fans, which Lam says can increase airflow to replace or supplement the use of an air conditioner, while using less electricity.
