= Ma Lin (biochemist) =

Hong Kong biochemist and educator

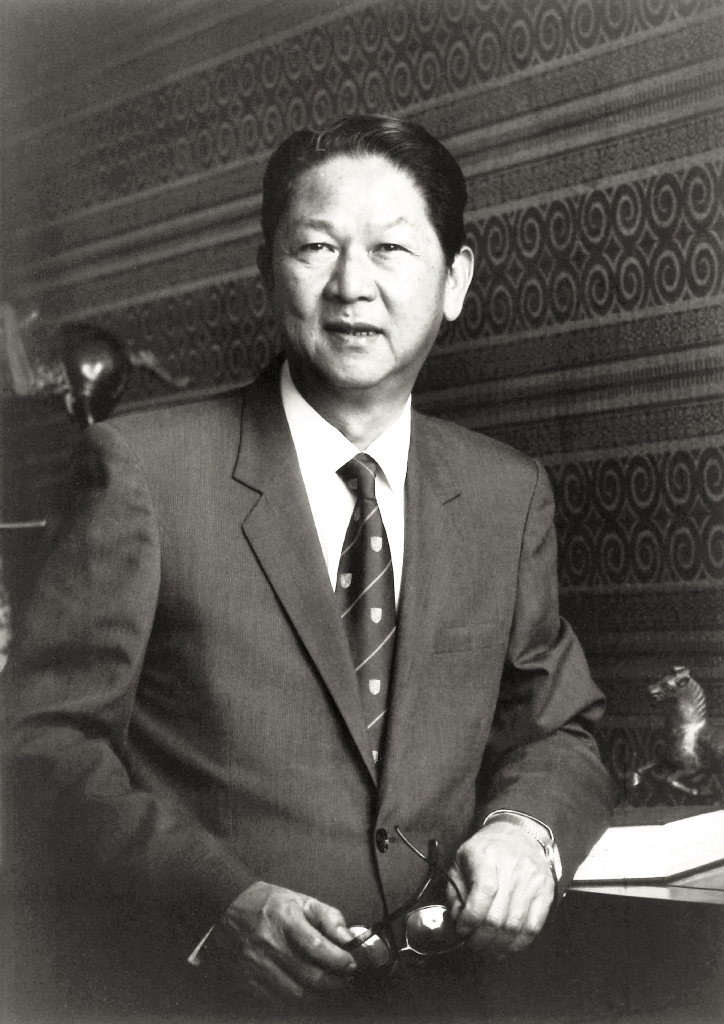
Ma Lin in the 1960s.

Ma Lin, CBE, JP (Chinese: 馬臨; 12 March 1924 or 8 February 1925 – 16 October 2017) was a biochemist and educator. He was the Vice-Chancellor of the Chinese University of Hong Kong (CUHK) from 1978 to 1987. He subsequently served as chairman of the board of trustees of Shaw College in CUHK.

== Biography ==
- 1947: Obtained the Bachelor of Science degree from West China Union University
- 1955: Obtained the PhD from the University of Leeds
- 1964: Joined the Chinese University of Hong Kong
- 1973: Became the founding professor and chair of the Department of Biochemistry
- 1978: Became Vice-Chancellor of The Chinese University of Hong Kong and appointed a non-official Justice of the Peace
- 1983: Appointed as Commander of the Most Excellent Order of the British Empire
- 1985-1990: Served as a Member of the Drafting Committee of the Basic Law for the Hong Kong Special Administrative Region
- 1987: Retired from Vice-Chancellor and establish Shaw College, the fourth constituent college of CUHK
- 1993-1998: Served as Member of the 9th National Committee of Chinese People's Political Consultative Conference
- 2017, Lin died in Prince of Wales Hospital in Sha Tin.

Academic offices
Preceded by Li Choh-ming	Vice-Chancellor of the Chinese University of Hong Kong; 1978–1987	Succeeded by Charles K. Kao
