= Conservancy Association =

Hong Kong non-governmental organisation

The Conservancy Association
- 長春社
- Type: Non-Governmental Organisation
- Location: Hong Kong
- Website: http://www.cahk.org.hk

The Conservancy Association (Chinese: 長春社) is a Hong Kong non-governmental organisation founded in 1968.

The organisation focuses on the protection of the environment and the conservation of natural and cultural heritage. It also seeks to enhance the quality of life of both current and future generations, and to ensure that Hong Kong shoulders her regional and global environmental responsibilities. The organisation advocates appropriate policies, monitors government action, promotes environmental education and takes a lead in community participation.

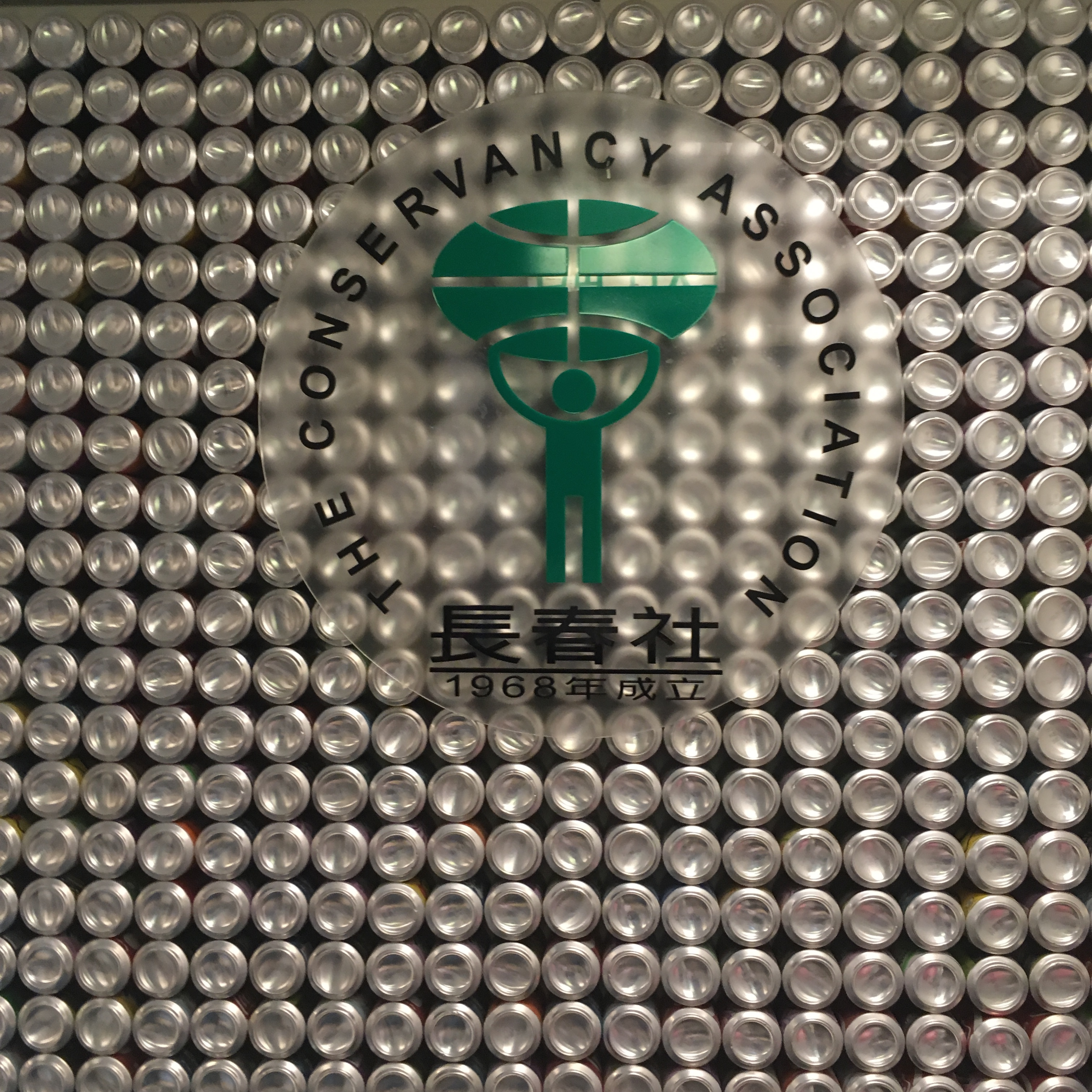
CAHK

== History ==
In 1967, John H. Pain (1930–2018) of Hong Kong Tourist Association, Prof. Brian Loft (1929 - 2015) of the University of Hong Kong, Jeremy Brown of Jardine Matheson and a Scottish lady Agnes Black formed a rambling group called "Bauhina's Circle". Their regard for the Hong Kong countryside came at the right time as the Hong Kong government made plans in 1968 for a "Provisional Council for the Use and Conservation of the Countryside", an idea from a government-commissioned report "Conservation of the Hong Kong Countryside" by Lee M. Talbot. The idea of forming an association came during one of these walks when they saw the destruction of the village land. In October 1968, they gathered at Helena May Institute and declared themselves "the Conservancy Association" - thus was born the first ever green group of Hong Kong.

Soon they recruited Robert N. Rayne of the Chinese University of Hong Kong, together with Prof. S. Y. Hu of the Chinese University of Hong Kong, Michael A. Webster, a keen bird-watcher, Sir Lindsay Ride, former Vice Chancellor of Hong Kong University and the others. Father H. Naylor of Wah Yan College, was invited by Robert N. Rayne. In 1971, Dr. Ding Lik-kiu was invited by John H. Pain to join the association.

At a 1972 workshop, members of the association reached a consensus that Hong Kong's countryside was threatened and would "cease to exist in an acceptable form" unless concrete action was taken to protect it. The association also considered pollution in urban areas an imminent threat to public health. It pressed the government to take action to turn Hong Kong from "one of the dirtiest, and potentially unhealthiest, cities in Asia to one of the cleanest, with clean air, clean water, clean streets, and community-conscious people."

Since then, the association positioned itself as a pressure group on environmental issues and launched a series of campaigns. In the early 1970s the association opposed the construction of a petrochemical complex on Lamma Island, proposed by Shell. This proposal was withdrawn in January 1975. Later the same decade, the association opposed the construction of the Lamma Power Station, which was eventually built.

In 2004 the association helped organise a campaign against the plan to tear down Hunghom Peninsula, a brand new housing estate built as Home Ownership Scheme public housing but sold instead to Sun Hung Kai Properties and New World Development following completion. Following a massive backlash and facing a public relations disaster, the developers rescinded the plans and decided to renovate the estate instead.
