= Silver Bauhinia Star =

Hong Kong award

Silver Bauhinia Star 銀紫荊星章
- Awarded for: taking a leading part in public affairs or voluntary work over a long period
- Post-nominals: SBS
- Established: 1997
- First award: 1998

Precedence
- Next (higher): Medal for Bravery (Gold)
- Next (lower): Medal for Bravery (Silver)

Silver Bauhinia Star
- Traditional Chinese: 銀紫荊星章
- Simplified Chinese: 银紫荆星章
Transcriptions
Standard Mandarin
- Hanyu Pinyin: Yín Zǐjīng Xīng Zhāng
Yue: Cantonese
- Jyutping: ngan4 zi2 ging1 sing1 zoeng1

The Silver Bauhinia Star (SBS; simplified Chinese: 银紫荆星章; traditional Chinese: 銀紫荊星章; pinyin: Yín Zǐjīng Xīng Zhāng) is the second rank of the Order of the Bauhinia Star under the honours system of Hong Kong, awarded to people who have taken a leading part in public affairs or voluntary work over a long period. The award was created in 1997 to replace the British honours system (such as Order of the British Empire) after the transfer of sovereignty to People's Republic of China and the establishment of the Hong Kong Special Administrative Region.

== List of recipients ==
The list below entails the recipients of the Silver Bauhinia Star.

=== 1998 ===
- Dr David FANG, SBS, JP
- Mr LEE Cho-jat, SBS
- Mr LI Shu-fai, SBS, JP
- Mr SHENG Len-tao, Andrew, SBS
- Dr SHAO You-bao, SBS
- Mrs Peggy LAM, SBS, JP
- Mr SHIU Sin-por, SBS
- Prof. Ambrose KING Yeo-chi, SBS, JP
- Mr Richard Alan SIEGEL, SBS, JP
- Mr WEI Wen-nam, Robert, SBS, JP
- Mrs LEUNG WONG Bei-fong, Sally, SBS, JP
- Mr CHAN Bing-woon, SBS, JP
- Mr Raymond R. WONG, SBS
- Mr CHENG Yiu-tong, SBS
- Mr LO Chung-hing, SBS
- Mr Ian Barry DALE, SBS
- Mr TAI Kuen, SBS, JP
- Mr Thomas Brian STEVENSON, SBS

=== 1999 ===
- Dr FANG Sum-suk, Marion, SBS, JP
- Prof. WONG Yue-chim, Richard, SBS
- Miss WU Suk-ching, Annie, SBS, JP
- The Hon. HO Sai-chu, SBS, JP
- The Hon. HO Sing-tin, Edward, SBS, JP
- Mr YU Kwok-chun, SBS, JP
- The Hon. Lee Kai-ming, SBS, JP
- Mr Brian DAGNALL, SBS, JP
- Prof. CHOW Wing-sun, Nelson, SBS, JP
- ~~Mr John Terence HUNG, SBS, JP~~
- Mr Barry Jonathan Clayton WOODROFFE, SBS, JP
- Mr LIANG Hin-ying, Herbert, SBS
- Mr HU Man-shiu, SBS, JP
- Mr Jackie CHAN, SBS
- Mr CHAN Tak-lam, Norman, SBS, JP
- Prof. CHENG Kai-ming, SBS, JP
- Mr YU Sun-say, SBS, JP
- Prof. LIU Pak-wai, SBS
- Sir Dickson Poon, CBE, SBS
- Dr PUN Kwok-shing, SBS, JP
- Mr LAI Ming-kee, SBS, JP
- The Hon. FOK Tsun-ting, Timothy, SBS, JP
- Prof. LUNG Ping-yee, David, SBS, JP
- Mr SO Kwok-wing, Andrew, SBS, JP
- Prof. Inga-Stina EWBANK, SBS
- Sir Edward PARKES, SBS

=== 2000 ===
- The Hon. Mrs Sophie LEUNG LAU Yau-fun, SBS, JP
- Dr YEH Meou-tsen, Geoffrey, SBS, JP
- Mr YEN Yuen-ho, Tony, SBS, JP
- Mr LEUNG Kwok-sun, SBS, JP
- Mr TSANG Kwong-yu, SBS, JP
- Mr FONG Ching, Eddy, SBS, JP
- Mr FONG Yun-wah, Henry, SBS, JP
- Prof. LEE Shiu-hung, SBS, JP
- Mr LAM Moon-tim, Bernard, SBS, JP
- Ms WU Hung-yuk, Anna, SBS, JP
- Mr CHEUNG Kin-tung, Marvin, SBS, JP
- Dr CHUANG Siu-leung, Andrew, SBS, JP
- Mr KOO Yee-yin, Irving, SBS, JP
- Mr NG Ping-cheong, SBS, JP
- Mr YANG Shen-sum, SBS, JP
- Mr LIU Yat-yuen, SBS, JP
- Prof. LAU Sau-shing, Patrick, SBS, JP

=== 2001 ===
- Mrs WEI CHUI Kit-yee, Lessie, SBS, JP
- Mr CHAU How-chen, SBS, JP
- Dr LEE Nai-shee, Harry, SBS, JP
- Mr LEE Man-ban, SBS
- Prof. CHOW Yat-ngok, York, SBS, JP
- Mrs LING LEE Ching-man, Eleanor, SBS, JP
- Mr FAN Hung-ling, Henry, SBS, JP
- Mr NGAI Shiu-kit, SBS, JP
- Mr LEUNG Cham-tim, SBS, JP
- Mr Peter James THOMPSON, SBS, JP
- Mr LIAO Cheung-sing, Andrew, SBS, SC, JP
- Mr Nigel Christopher Leslie SHIPMAN, SBS, JP
- Mr David Thomas Rhys CARSE, SBS, JP
- Mrs KWAN KO Siu-wah, SBS, JP
- Mrs CHA SHIH May-lung, Laura, SBS, JP
- Dr James WU, SBS
- Mr ZEE Kwoh-kung, SBS
- Mr LO Yau-lai, Winston, SBS
- Mr Robert George KOTEWALL, SBS, SC

=== 2002 ===
- Mr CHAO Kuang-piu, SBS
- Mr NG Ching-kwok, SBS, JP
- Mr HSU King-ping, SBS, JP
- Mr CHEUNG Hok-ming, SBS, JP
- Mr Robert Douglas POPE, SBS, JP
- Mr SHUM Choi-sang, SBS, JP
- Miss CHEUNG Man-yee, SBS, JP
- Prof. LEUNG Ping-chung, SBS, JP
- Mr CHEN Nan-lok, Philip, SBS, JP
- Mr WONG Kong-hon, SBS, JP
- Mr LIU Ching-leung, SBS, JP
- Dr CHOI Yuen-wan, Philemon, SBS, JP
- Mr PAU Shiu-hung, SBS, JP
- Mr CHUNG Po-yang, SBS, JP
- Mr KWOK Man-wai, Tony, SBS, IDS
- Mrs YU LAI Ching-ping, Helen, SBS
- Mr LAM Chung-lun, Billy, SBS
- Mr WAI Kee-shun, SBS
- Mr Francis G. MARTIN, SBS
- Prof. Ruth E. S. HAYHOE, SBS
- Revd Hugh PHILLIPSON, SBS
- Mrs FEI SOO Mo-chi, SBS
- Prof. John WONG, SBS
- Mr LAU Yuk-kuen, Douglas, SBS
- Ms Tsar Teh-Yun, SBS

=== 2003 ===
- Mr CHAN Yin-tat, Dominic, SBS, JP
- The Hon. YOUNG How-wah, Howard, SBS, JP
- Mr WONG Hung-kin, James, SBS, JP
- Mr SHUM Man-to, SBS, JP
- Mr CHOW Wing-kin, Anthony, SBS, JP
- Dr LAM Hung-kwan, SBS, JP
- Mr LEUNG Sai-wah, Paul, SBS, JP
- Dr Philip KWOK, SBS, JP
- Mr LUK Ping-chuen, SBS, JP
- Mr WONG Chi-yun, Allan, SBS, JP
- Prof. YEUNG Yue-man, SBS, JP
- Prof. William Ian Rees DAVIES, SBS, JP
- Prof. Ivor John HODGKISS, SBS, JP
- Mr David John LITTLE, SBS
- Mr CHOW Yun-fat, SBS
- Mr LAM Kwong-siu, SBS
- Prof. ZEE Sze-yong, Shane, SBS
- Prof. CHEUNG Yau-kai, SBS
- Mr Darwin CHEN, SBS
- Mr Daniel R. FUNG, SBS, SC
- Mr TANG Kwan, SBS
- Mr KAN Fook-yee, SBS

=== 2004 ===
- The Hon. TING Woo-shou, Kenneth, SBS, JP
- The Hon. NG Leung-sing, SBS, JP
- The Hon. HUI Cheung-ching, SBS, JP
- The Hon. LAU Ping-cheung, SBS
- The Hon. MA Fung-kwok, SBS, JP
- Justice TANG Ching, Robert, SBS, JP
- Mr LAM Kin-fung, Jeffrey, SBS, JP
- Mr MAK Ching-hung, SBS, JP
- Mr John Robertson BUDGE, SBS, JP
- Mr LAM Kwong-yu, Albert, SBS, JP
- Mr Alan HOO, SBS, SC, JP
- Prof. YUEN Kwok-yung, SBS, JP
- Mr LEUNG Kwan-yuen, Andrew, SBS, JP
- Mr HUI Chun-fui, Victor, SBS, JP
- Dr YEUNG Chun-kam, Charles, SBS, JP
- Dr York LIAO, SBS, JP
- Mr Christopher Iain Carlyle JACKSON, SBS, JP
- Dr TAI Tak-fung, SBS, JP
- Mr HAU Shui-pui, SBS
- Mr James Wyndham John HUGHES-HALLETT, SBS
- Mr Leo A. DALY, SBS
- Prof. SUNG Jao-yiu, Joseph, SBS
- Miss Liza WANG, SBS

=== 2005 ===
- Dr the Hon. LUI Ming-wah, SBS, JP
- The Hon. Chan Kam-lam, SBS, JP
- Mr LIN Sun-mo, Willy, SBS, JP
- Mr CHAN Kar-lok, Walter, SBS, JP
- Mr CHU Yu-lin, David, SBS, JP
- Mr YU Pang-chun, SBS, JP
- Prof. LEE Chack-fan, SBS, JP
- Mr CHOW Man-yiu, Paul, SBS, JP
- Mr HEUNG Cheuk-kei, SBS, JP
- Mr CHEUNG Tat-kwing, Raymond, SBS, JP
- Mr LEUNG Kin-pong, Andrew, SBS, JP
- Mr LEONG Ka-chai, SBS, JP
- Mr CHAN Shu-ying, SBS, JP
- Mr YEUNG Ka-sing, SBS, JP
- Mr FOK Chun-wan, Ian, SBS, JP
- Mr CHUNG Pui-lam, SBS, JP
- Dr LAW Chi-kwong, SBS, JP
- Mr Robert John Steen LAW, SBS, JP
- Prof. Anna PAO SOHMEN, SBS
- Prof. Gerard McCOY, SBS, SC

=== 2006 ===
- The Hon. LAM Wai-keung, Daniel, SBS, JP
- Dr HO Chung-tai, Raymond, SBS, JP
- The Hon. FUNG Kin-kee, Frederick, SBS, JP
- Ms TING Yuk-chee, Christina, SBS, JP
- Mr NG Sze-fuk, George, SBS, JP
- Dr CHAN Tung, SBS, JP
- Mr IP Kwok-chung, SBS, JP
- Mr HO Wing-huen, Frederick, SBS, JP
- Mr LI Tze-leung, Brian, SBS, JP
- Mr LEE Jark-pui, SBS, JP
- Mr LAM Chun-man, SBS, JP
- Prof. LAM Kin-che, SBS, JP
- Dr KO Chan-gock, William, SBS, JP
- Ir Dr TSUI Shung-yiu, SBS, JP
- Mr TSAO Tak-kiang, Lorenz, SBS, JP
- Mr HSU Hsung, Adolf, SBS, JP
- Dr Judith Mary Longstaff MACKAY, SBS, JP
- Mr WU Moon-hoi, Marco, SBS, JP
- Mr Robert Charles Law FOOTMAN, SBS, JP
- Prof. FAN Sheung-tat, SBS
- Mr TSAO Wen-king, Frank, SBS

=== 2007 ===
- Prof. CHAN Ka-keung, SBS, JP
- The Hon. CHAN Yuen-han, SBS, JP
- The Hon. SIN Chung-kai, SBS, JP (revoked)
- The Hon. WONG Yung-kan, SBS, JP
- The Hon. SHEK Lai-him, Abraham, SBS, JP
- The Hon. CHEUNG Yu-yan, Tommy, SBS, JP
- Dr TANG Siu-tong, SBS, JP
- Prof. WONG Siu-lun, SBS, JP
- Mr WONG Ying-wai, Wilfred, SBS, JP
- Ms KI Man-fung, Leonie, SBS, JP
- Miss Jacqueline Ann WILLIS, SBS, JP
- Mr MA Ho-fai, SBS, JP
- Mr LEUNG Wing-lup, Gregory, SBS, JP
- Mr KWOK Ping-kwong, Thomas, SBS, JP (revoked)
- Prof. CHAN Chi-fai, Andrew, SBS, JP
- Mr PANG Tsan-wing, SBS, JP
- Ms FEI Fih, SBS, JP
- Mr FUNG Chee-keung, Bosco, SBS, JP
- Mr CHENG Wai-sun, Edward, SBS
- Mr LAI Sze-hoi, SBS, JP
- Mr Anthony John Liddell NIGHTINGALE, SBS, JP
- Mr PANG Sung-yuen, SBS, CSDSM
- Mr Robert Charles ALLCOCK, SBS
- Mr Neil Trevor KAPLAN, QC, SBS, JP
- Mr CHIANG Yam-wang, Allan, SBS

=== 2008 ===
- The Hon. FANG Kang, Vincent, SBS, JP
- Mr TUNG Chee-chen, SBS, JP
- Dr WONG Kwok-keung, SBS, JP
- Mr WAI Kwok-hung, SBS, JP
- Mr KWOK Jing-keung, SBS, FSDSM, JP
- Mr LEE, Joseph Chung-tak, SBS, JP
- Dr CHOW Chun-kay, Stephen, SBS, JP
- Mr WONG Sik-kei, Anthony, SBS, JP
- Mr LO Hing-chung, SBS, JP
- Mr LEUNG Sik-wah, SBS, JP
- Mr PANG Yiu-kai, SBS, JP
- Dr FUNG Kwok-lun, William, SBS, JP
- Mr FUNG Choi-cheung, SBS, JP
- Mr WONG Chee-keung, SBS, JP
- Mr WONG Fook-hum, Ronny, SBS, SC, JP
- Mr LAU Lai-chiu, Patrick, SBS, JP
- Prof. TANG Wai-king, Grace, SBS, JP
- Mr LAI Tung-kwok, SBS, IDSM
- Mrs LOUEY Wai-hung, Kathryn, SBS
- Mr John Anthony MILLER, SBS
- Mr AU Man-ho, SBS
- Mr FUNG Siu-yuen, Gordon, SBS
- Prof. Joseph Sriyal Malik PEIRIS, SBS
- Ms LO Kai-yin, SBS

=== 2009 ===
- The Hon. LI Wah-ming, Fred, SBS, JP
- Dr the Hon. LEE Kok-long, Joseph, SBS, JP
- Prof. LEONG Chi-yan, John, SBS, JP
- Mr CHAN Chung-bun, Bunny, SBS, JP
- Mr YIN Tek-shing, Paul, SBS, JP
- Mrs LEONG WONG Man-suen, Mona, SBS, JP
- Dr Sammy POONE, SBS, JP
- Mr LO Man-tuen, SBS, JP
- Mr HO Kwong-wai, SBS, JP
- Mr Benjamin YU, SC, SBS, JP
- Mr YUE Chi-hang, SBS, JP
- Mrs LI LI Ka-lai, Lucia, SBS, JP
- Mr LAM Chiu-ying, SBS, JP
- Dr WILLIS YAU Sheung-mui, Carrie, SBS, JP
- Mr OR Ching-fai, Raymond, SBS, JP
- Mr HUNG Chao-hong, Albert, SBS, JP
- Ms KAO Ching-chi, Sophia, SBS, JP
- Mr CHEUNG Hau-wai, SBS, JP
- Ir LEUNG Kwong-ho, Edmund, SBS, JP
- Mr YEUNG Sum, SBS, JP (revoked)
- Dr YEUNG Hin-chung, John, SBS, JP
- Prof. FOK Tai-fai, SBS, JP
- Dr KAN Man-lok, Paul, SBS, JP
- Mr TAM Wing-pong, SBS, JP
- D. MA Kai-cheung, SBS
- Dr YIP Shu-lam, SBS
- Mr LAM Shu-chit, SBS
- Mr LAU Nai-keung, SBS

=== 2010 ===
- The Hon. LI Fung-ying, SBS, JP
- Mr LIE-A-CHEONG Tai-chong, David, SBS, JP
- Dr LIM Wei-ling, Wilina, SBS, JP
- Mr CHAN Iu-seng, Star, SBS, JP
- Mr NG Sau-kei, Wilfred, SBS, MH, JP
- Mrs HUNG KWOK Wai-ching, Stella, SBS, JP
- Mr Ian Grenville CROSS, SBS, SC, JP
- Mr Stephen Frederick FISHER, SBS, JP
- Mr CHEUNG King-man, SBS, JP
- Prof. CHEN Hung-yee, Albert, SBS, JP
- Mr CHAN Yuk-tak, Eddy, SBS, JP
- Mr LIU Changle, SBS, JP
- Mrs LAU MAK Yee-ming, Alice, SBS, JP
- Mr LO Kar-chun, Nicky, SBS, JP
- Mr YAM Tat-wing, SBS, PDSM
- Mr WOO Yu-sum, John, SBS
- Ms LAM Shuk-yee, SBS
- Mr KAI Yau-ming, SBS
- Mr PANG Chung, SBS
- Mr KAN Tai-keung, SBS
- Mrs SIU TSANG Fung-kwan, SBS
- Prof. YU Yue-hong, Richard, SBS
- Mr CHOI Yiu-kwan, SBS

=== 2011 ===
- The Hon. Mr Justice John Lonsdale SAUNDERS, SBS
- Mr LAI Ying-sie, Benedict, SBS, JP
- Ms MAR Yuet-har, SBS, MH
- Dr WONG Chi-ho, Jimmy, SBS, JP
- Dr TSO Wei-kwok, Homer, SBS, JP
- Dr NG Tat-lun, SBS, JP
- Mr FAN Chor-ho, Paul, SBS, JP
- Ms YEUNG Chi-hung, SBS, JP
- Dr YUNG Wing-ki, Samuel, SBS, MH, JP
- Mr WONG Kine-yuen, SBS, MH, JP
- Mr NG Hak-kim, Eddie, SBS, JP
- Mr NG Leung-ho, SBS, JP
- Mrs LEE WONG Pui-ling, Angelina, SBS, JP
- Dr LEE Boon-ying, SBS, JP
- Dr LI Kwok-tung, Donald, SBS, JP
- Mr LI Kwok-tso, SBS, JP
- Dr WANG Shui-chung, Patrick, SBS, JP
- Mr FUNG Hing-wang, SBS, JP
- Mr CHAI Sung-veng, SBS, JP
- Mr Stephen Richard SELBY, SBS, JP
- Mr Keith Graham KERR, SBS, JP
- Mr PEH Yun-lu, Simon, SBS, IDSM
- Mr KWOK Leung-ming, SBS, CSDSM
- Dr SETO Wing-hong, SBS
- Mr HO Wing-ko, Peter, SBS
- Dr LAM Kar-sing, SBS
- Mrs LIU TONG Wei-oi, Rita, SBS
- The Hon. Mr Justice William Duncan STONE, SBS
- Mrs NG TSE Suk-ying, Ava, SBS
- Prof. LO Yuk-ming, Dennis, SBS

=== 2012 ===
- The Hon. WONG Ting-kwong, SBS, JP
- Dr the Hon. LAM Tai-fai, SBS, JP
- Prof. CHAN Yuk-shee, SBS, JP
- The Hon. Mr Justice PANG Kin-kee, SBS
- Mr Edward Patrick Aquinas MORAN, SBS, JP
- Mr Martin McKenzie GLASS, SBS, JP
- Mr TSO Man-tai, Thomas, SBS, JP
- Mr MA Ching-yuk, SBS, JP
- Mr CHAN Tak-chor, SBS, MH, JP
- Mr Charles Nicholas BROOKE, SBS, JP
- Mr LAU Hon-wah, Steve, SBS, JP
- Prof. LO King-man, SBS, JP
- Prof. CHOW Shew-ping, SBS, JP
- Dr LAM Ping-yan, SBS, JP
- Miss CHEUNG Siu-hing, SBS, JP
- Mrs LEUNG KO May-yee, Margaret, SBS, JP
- Ms LEUNG Fung-yee, Julia, SBS, JP
- Ms HUI Hiu-fai, Florence, SBS, JP
- Mr CHAN Kin-ping, SBS, JP
- Mr CHEN Wei-on, Kenneth, SBS, JP
- Mr CHAN Hung-cheung, Stephen, SBS, JP
- Miss MAK Yee-ming, Jennifer, SBS, JP
- Mr PANG Yuk-ling, SBS, JP
- Mrs LAU LAI Siu-wan, Marigold, SBS, JP
- Mr Roger Freeman TUPPER, SBS, JP
- Ms KWAN Sik-ning, Maria, SBS, JP
- Mr CHUNG Wai-ping, SBS, MH
- Mr LI Ming-chak, Daniel, SBS, IDS
- Mr LO Chun-hung, Gregory, SBS, FSDSM
- Mrs WONG YIM Kwan-kam, Christine, SBS
- Ms Barbara FEI, SBS
- Ms NG Man-wah, Pauline, SBS
- The Reverend Dr LI Ping-kwong, SBS
- The Hon. Mr Justice Alan Raymond WRIGHT, SBS
- Mr Michael Anthony McMAHON, SBS
- The Venerable WING Sing, SBS

=== 2013 ===
- Dr the Hon. LEUNG Mei-fun, Priscilla, SBS, JP (upgraded to GBS in 2024)
- The Hon. Madam Justice Clare-Marie BEESON, SBS
- Mr Raj Sital MOTWANI, SBS, JP
- Mr MA Lee-tak, SBS, JP
- Mr CHAN Heung-ping, SBS, JP
- Mr SO Sai-chi, SBS, MH
- Prof. SHEK Tan-lei, Daniel, SBS, JP
- Dr LEE Shu-wing, Ernest, SBS, JP
- Dr TIK Chi-yuen, SBS, JP
- Mr YAU How-boa, Stephen, SBS, MH, JP
- Mr CHEN Cheng-jen, Clement, SBS, JP
- Mr WONG Chung-chuen, SBS, JP
- Ms WONG Wai-ching, SBS, JP
- Mr CHU Yam-yuen, SBS, JP
- Mr Ambrose HO, SBS, SC, JP
- Mr LEUNG Cheuk-fai, Jimmy, SBS, JP
- Dr MAK Hoi-hung, Michael, SBS, JP
- Mr WONG Yuen-fai, Stanley, SBS, JP
- Mr TANG Kam-moon, SBS, PDSM
- Dr TONG Wai-ki, SBS, MH
- Mr WONG Kam-po, SBS, MH
- Dr CHUNG King-fai, SBS
- Prof. LAU Wan-yee, Joseph, SBS

=== 2014 ===
- The Hon. WONG Kwok-kin, SBS
- The Hon. CHEUNG Wah-fung, Christopher, SBS, JP
- The Hon. LIAO Cheung-kong, Martin, SBS, JP
- Dr TONG Yun-kai, SBS
- The Hon. Mr Justice Azizul Rahman SUFFIAD, SBS
- The Hon. Mr Justice Peter John LINE, SBS
- Mr SIN Yat-kin, SBS, CSDSM
- Mr SUEN Kai-cheong, SBS, MH, JP
- Dr NG Cho-nam, SBS, JP
- Mr AU Weng-hei, William, SBS, JP
- Prof. LEUNG Nai-kong, SBS, JP
- Mr HUI Chung-shing, Herman, SBS, MH, JP
- Ms CHAN Vivien, SBS, JP
- Mr LAU Chin-ho, Stanley, SBS, MH, JP
- Mr HO Kin-wah, Arthur, SBS, JP
- Prof. LAM Kwan-sing, Paul, SBS, JP
- Mr TONG Carlson, SBS, JP
- Mr AU Choi-kai, SBS, JP
- Mr CHEUNG Kam-fai, Peter, SBS, JP
- Mr CHAN Chi-chiu, SBS, JP
- Mrs BROWN TSANG Mui-fan, Mimi, SBS, JP
- Mrs WONG CHUI Yue-chue, Lesley, SBS, JP
- Mr JAT Sew-tong, SBS, JP
- Mrs OU-YANG FONG Lily, SBS, JP
- Mr LAW Yee-kwan, Quinn, SBS, JP
- Dr TAM Kam-kau, SBS, JP
- Mr CHAN Chor-kam, Andy, SBS, FSDSM

=== 2015 ===
- Ir Dr the Hon. LO Wai-kwok, SBS, MH, JP
- The Venerable CHI Wai, SBS
- Mr WONG Chi-kong, Alan, SBS, JP
- Mr POON Ying-kwong, Frank, SBS, JP
- Miss WONG Wing-chen, Janet, SBS, JP
- Mr PANG Cheung-wai, Thomas, SBS, JP
- Mr KWOK Hing-wai, Kenneth, SBS, JP
- Dr CHAN Ching-har, Eliza, SBS, JP
- Prof. CHAN Cheung-ming, Alfred, SBS, JP
- Mr MA Yiu-tim, SBS, JP
- Prof. LIANG Hin-suen, Raymond, SBS, JP
- Mr MA Wai-luk, SBS, PDSM
- The Hon. Mrs Justice Verina Saeeda BOKHARY, SBS

=== 2016 ===
- The Hon. LEE Wai-king, Starry, SBS, JP
- Ms LUK Siu-ping, Amelia, SBS, JP
- Mr LAI Man-hin, SBS, FSDSM
- Mr LEE Man-chun, Raymond, SBS, JP
- Mr LI Hon-shing, Michael, SBS, JP
- Mr LAM Chun, Daniel, SBS, JP
- Ms KO Po-ling, SBS, MH, JP
- Mr LEUNG Wing-cheung, William, SBS, JP
- Ms CHEN Sheau-ling, Cecilia Daisy, SBS, MH, JP
- Mr TANG Yat-sun, Richard, SBS, JP
- Mr KAN Chung-nin, Tony, SBS, JP
- Mr SZE Chi-ching, SBS, JP
- Prof. CHEUNG Mui-ching, Fanny, SBS, JP
- Mrs TAN KAM Mi-wah, Pamela, SBS, JP
- Mr MAK Ching-yu, Kenneth, SBS, JP
- Mr TANG Ching-ho, SBS, JP
- Mr CHAN Kwok-ki, SBS, IDSM
- Mr WONG Sai-chiu, SBS, IDS
- Mr PUI Kwan-kay, SBS, MH
- Mr CHAU On-ta-yuen, SBS
- Mr Richard Lloyd PONTZIOUS, SBS
- Mr NGUYEN Van-tu, Peter, SBS
- Mr CHAN King-wai, SBS

=== 2017 ===
- The Hon. YICK Chi-ming, Frankie, SBS, JP
- The Hon. LEUNG Che-cheung, SBS, MH, JP
- Mr TAN Siu-lin, SBS
- Ms LOH Kung-wai, Christine, SBS, JP
- Mr YAU Shing-mu, SBS, JP
- Mr LEE Ka-chiu, John, SBS, PDSM, JP
- Mr LEUNG King-kwok, Godfrey, SBS, JP
- Mr YAU Chi-chiu, SBS, CSDSM
- Mr CHOW Yuk-tong, SBS, MH
- Mr HO Hau-cheung, SBS, MH
- Mr YU Kam-kee, Lawrence, SBS, JP
- Ms CHAU Chuen-heung, SBS, MH, JP
- Mr HU Shao-ming, Herman, SBS, JP
- Mr KWOK Siu-ming, Simon, SBS, JP
- Mr KWOK Lam-kwong, Larry, SBS, JP
- Mr CHEN Chung-nin, Rock, SBS, JP
- Mr CHAN Ka-kui, SBS, JP
- Mr LUI Tim-leung, Tim, SBS, JP
- Mr CHIU Yu-hei, SBS, JP
- Mr LAI Sze-nuen, SBS, JP
- Mr CHUNG Shu-kun, Christopher, SBS, MH, JP
- Mr LAU Ka-keung, Peter, SBS, JP
- Mr LAM Siu-lo, Andrew, SBS, JP
- Mr LING Kar-kan, SBS, JP
- Mr GAO Gunter, SBS, JP
- Mr HUI Siu-wai, SBS, JP
- Mr YEUNG Kin-man, SBS, JP
- Mrs LAU KUN Lai-kuen, Stella, SBS, JP
- Mr SO Hing-woh, Victor, SBS, JP
- Mr WONG Chi-hung, Tony, SBS, PDSM
- Prof. CHING Pak-chung, SBS
- Mr LO Wan-sing, Vincent, SBS
- Mr LAM Ko-yin, Colin, SBS
- Mr CHAN Ngok-pang, Ronald, SBS
- The Hon. Mr Justice TONG Po-sun, Louis, SBS

=== 2018 ===
- Dr the Hon. CHIANG Lai-wan, Ann, SBS, JP
- Prof. WONG Yuk-shan, SBS, JP
- Mr TSANG Keung, SBS
- Mr LAM Kwok-leung, SBS, CSDSM
- Mr YIP Wing-shing, David, SBS, MH, JP
- Mr WONG Ming-yam, SBS, JP
- Mr KWOK Chun-wah, Jimmy, SBS, MH, JP
- Ms CHAN Suk-mei, May, SBS, JP
- Mr WONG Kwan-yu, SBS, MH, JP
- Mr LO Wing-sang, Vincent, SBS, JP
- Mr LAM Tin-sing, Enoch, SBS, JP
- Mr LEUNG Koon-kee, Anthony, SBS, JP
- Ms LEUNG Ka-lai, Ada, SBS, JP
- Mrs CHAN Helen, SBS, JP
- Mr HUANG Lester Garson, SBS, JP
- Mr SIU Man-tat, SBS, JP
- Mr CHAU Kwok-leung, Alfred, SBS, PDSM
- Mr LEE Man-tat, SBS
- Dr CHAN Yau-nam, Ian, SBS, MH
- Dr POON Sun-cheong, Patrick, SBS

=== 2019 ===
- Dr the Hon. LAM Ching-choi, SBS, JP
- Prof. CHEUNG Yan-leung, Stephen, SBS, JP
- The Hon. Mr Justice CHUNG On-tak, Andrew, SBS
- Mr CHU King-yuen, SBS, MH, JP
- Mr CHOW Wing-shing, Vincent, SBS, JP
- Mr KAN Chi-ho, SBS, MH, JP
- Dr LI Sze-lim, SBS, JP
- Ir TONG Ka-hung, Edwin, SBS, JP
- Dr CHEUNG Tin-cheung, SBS, JP
- Prof. CHAN Ka-leung, Francis, SBS, JP
- Ms LAU Yin-hing, Connie, SBS, JP
- Ms CHOI Kit-yu, Kitty, SBS, JP
- Mr TANG Wai-kong, Leslie, SBS, JP
- Mr SIU Yu-bun, Alan, SBS, JP
- Ir CHUNG Kum-wah, Daniel, SBS, JP
- Mr LAU Yip-shing, SBS, PDSM
- Mr SING Hon-keung, SBS, MH
- Ms CHENG Ming-ming, SBS
- Mr LAI Ming, Leon, SBS, MH
- Mr YAN Huichang, Hubert, SBS
- Dr NG Chau-pei, Stanley, SBS
- Ir Prof. CHAN Ching-chuen, SBS
- Mr CHU Lap-lik, Victor, SBS

=== 2020 ===
- The Hon. Mr Justice Mohan Tarachand BHARWANEY, SBS
- Dr NG Wang-pun, Dennis, SBS, MH
- Mr WONG Kuen-fai, SBS, JP
- Mr LI Kin-yat, SBS, FSDSM
- Mr LI Tin-chui, Simon, SBS, JP
- Dr KONG Tak-ho, SBS, JP
- Dr CHAN WONG Lai-kuen, Anissa, SBS, MH, JP
- Ms LAU Chiang-chu, Vivien, SBS, JP
- Dr LEUNG Pak-yin, SBS, JP
- Ms HO Chiu-king, Pansy Catilina, SBS, JP
- Dr CHEN Hong-tian, SBS, JP
- Ms CHAN Oi-ching, SBS, JP
- Mr Ashley Ian ALDER, SBS, JP
- Ms TAM Wan-chi, Winnie, SBS, JP
- Mr SO Cheung-wing, SBS, JP
- Dr Patricia LEAHY, SBS
- Dr WOO Wai-man, SBS
- Mr SHUN Chi-ming, SBS
- Mr LI Xiaojia, Charles, SBS
- Dr John Gerald GREENWOOD, SBS
- Mr Jaap VAN ZWEDEN, SBS
- Ms Theresa Ann JOHNSON, SBS

=== 2021 ===
- Mr TANG Yi-hoi, SBS, CDSM
- The Hon. CHAN Hak-kan, SBS, JP
- The Hon. YIU Si-wing, SBS
- Ms WONG Pui-sze, Priscilla, SBS, JP
- Mr LI Ying-sang, Tommy, SBS, MH, JP
- Dr CHAN Chi-kau, Johnnie Casire, SBS, JP
- Dr CHAN Kin-keung, Eugene, SBS, JP
- Mr LEE Kai-wing, Raymond, SBS, JP
- Mrs LAM YU Ka-wai, Sylvia, SBS, JP
- Mr LAM Ting-kwok, Paul, SBS, SC, JP
- Dr WONG Tin-yau, Kelvin, SBS, JP
- Mr NG Win-kong, Daryl, SBS, JP
- Mr WONG Chung-leung, SBS, JP
- Mr WONG Shing-hei, SBS, JP
- Mr CHOI Lap-yiu, SBS, JP
- Ms CHENG Cheung-ling, SBS, JP
- Prof. CHE Chi-ming, SBS
- Mr Saeed UDDIN, SBS, MH
- Dr YIP Wai-hong, SBS, MH
- Mrs SO CHAN Wai-hang, Susan, SBS
- Ms FUNG Sau-kuen, Connie, SBS
- Sir Howard NEWBY, SBS

=== 2022 ===
- The Hon. CHEUNG Kwok-kwan, Horace, SBS, JP
- The Hon. MAK Mei-kuen, Alice, SBS, JP
- Mr WOO Ying-ming, SBS, CSDSM
- The Hon. Madam Justice NG May-ling, Marlene, SBS
- Dr CHAN Hon-yee, Constance, SBS, JP
- Mrs TING YIP Yin-mei, Jessie, SBS, JP
- Miss CHOW Shuk-ching, Mary, SBS, JP
- Mr LEUNG Chi-yan, John, SBS, JP
- Ir LEUNG Wai-hung, Joseph, SBS, FSDSM
- Mr WONG Kwai-huen, Albert, SBS, JP
- Prof. YAM Wing-wah, Vivian, SBS, JP
- Dr TSUI Wai-ling, Carlye, SBS, JP
- Prof. IP Yuk-yu, Nancy, SBS, MH, JP
- Mr WONG Yick-kam, Michael, SBS, MH, JP
- Mr YU Tak-cheung, SBS, JP
- Mr NG Wing-shun, Anthony Vincent, SBS, JP
- Dr CHENG Chi-kong, Adrian, SBS, JP
- Dr LEE Wai-sze, Sarah, SBS, MH
- Dr SHEN Jin-kang, SBS, MH
- Mr Reinaldo Maria CORDEIRO, SBS
- Ir Dr CHAN Siu-kun, Alex, SBS
- Dr WONG Kwai-kuen, Leo, SBS
- Mr POON Siu-ping, SBS, MH
- Miss Siobhan Bernadette HAUGHEY, SBS
- Mr CHEUNG Ka-long, SBS
- Mr John Robert SLOSAR, SBS
- Mr KWOK Kai-fai, Adam, SBS
- Prof. Sir David Stephen EASTWOOD, SBS

=== 2023 ===
- The Hon. LAU Ip-keung, Kenneth, SBS, MH, JP
- Mr AU Ka-wang, SBS, IDSM
- The Hon. QUAT Elizabeth, SBS, JP
- The Hon. Mr Justice YAU Chi-lap, Joseph, SBS
- The Hon. Mr Justice WONG Sung-hau, Albert, SBS
- Mr YUEN Man-chung, Tommy, SBS, JP
- Mr LO Kwok-wah, SBS, JP
- Mr LAM Wai-kiu, Victor, SBS, JP
- Ms PUN Ting-ting, Rebecca, SBS, JP
- Mr LO Chi-hong, SBS, JP
- Ms LAM Mei-sau, Linda, SBS
- Dr SHI Lop-tak, Allen, SBS, MH, JP
- Ms YAO Jue, SBS, JP
- Dr CHAI Ngai-chiu, Sunn, SBS, JP
- Mr SUEN Kwok-lam, SBS, MH, JP
- Mrs FUNG MA Kit-han, Jenny, SBS, JP
- Dr CHENG Kam-chung, Eric, SBS, MH, JP
- Dr CHENG Cho-ming, SBS, JP
- Mr LAM Hung-san, SBS, JP
- Mr YUEN Chi-wai, SBS, JP
- Ir PANG Alice, SBS, JP
- Mr PANG Hiu-ming, Peter, SBS, JP
- Mr YUEN Yuk-kin, Albert, SBS, PDSM
- Ms LAU Chi-wai, Edwina, SBS, PDSM
- Ms WONG Siu-wah, SBS
- Mr LEE Yin-yee, SBS, MH
- Mr WONG Chun-hong, SBS
- Mr CHIU David, SBS

=== 2024 ===
- The Hon. CHAN Yung, SBS, JP
- The Hon. Madam Justice AU-YEUNG Kwai-yue, Queeny, SBS
- The Hon. Madam Justice CHU Pui-ying, Bebe, SBS
- Dr LEUNG Siu-fai, SBS, JP
- Ir CHAN Pai-ming, SBS, JP
- Mr LO Sai-hung, Brian, SBS, JP
- Ms YUEN Siu-wai, Carol, SBS, JP
- Mr CHENG Chung-wai, Daniel, SBS, JP
- Mrs NG WONG Yee-man, Gloria, SBS, JP
- Mr NG Wah-kong, SBS, JP
- Mr LI Tak-hong, SBS, MH, JP
- Prof. TONG Wai-cheung, Timothy, SBS, JP
- Mr CHAN Man-chau, SBS, JP
- Mr FUNG Hau-chung, Andrew, SBS, JP
- Ms WONG Pik-kiu, Peggy, SBS, MH, JP
- Mr LAU Tak-wah, Andy, SBS, MH, JP
- Mr LO Wing-hung, SBS, JP
- Mr SIU Chor-kee, SBS, MH, JP
- Mr LUNG Chee-ming, George, SBS, MH, JP
- Dr YIM Yuk-lun, Stanley, SBS, JP
- Ir PANG Yiu-hung, SBS, JP
- Mr CHU Man-kin, Ricky, SBS, IDS
- Mr YUNG Chi-ming, SBS, MH
- Dr PAN Pey-chyou, SBS

=== 2025 ===
- Ms. HO Pui-shan, S.B.S., C.D.S.M.
- The Honourable NG Wing-ka, Jimmy, S.B.S., J.P.
- The Honourable TSE Wai-chuen, Tony, S.B.S., J.P.
- Reverend Canon the Honourable KOON Ho-ming, Peter Douglas, S.B.S., J.P.
- Ms. CHEUNG Kam-wai, Christina, S.B.S., J.P.
- Mr. CHAN Ka-shun, Carlson, S.B.S., J.P.
- Mr. TAM Tai-pang, S.B.S., J.P.
- Mr. LIU Ming-kwong, Vincent, S.B.S., J.P.
- Mr. CHANG Wai-yuen, Rex, S.B.S., J.P.
- Mr. CHONG Yan-tung, Chris, S.B.S., J.P.
- Mrs. CHEUNG CHIU Hoi-yue, Alice, S.B.S., J.P.
- Mr. WONG Ting-chung, S.B.S., J.P.
- Mr WONG Chung-leung, SBS, JP
- Professor CHAI, John Yat-chiu, S.B.S., J.P.
- Ms. KO Pui-shuen, S.B.S., J.P.
- Mr. Henry TAN, S.B.S., J.P.
- Mr. CHAN Nam-po, S.B.S., J.P.
- Mr. YANG Chuen-liang, Charles, S.B.S., J.P.
- Ms. IP Shun-hing, S.B.S., M.H., J.P.
- Mr. TANG Yau-choi, S.B.S., J.P.
- Mr. CHENG Cheuk-piu, S.B.S., J.P.
- Ms. YU Po-mei, Clarice, S.B.S., J.P.
- Ms. CHEUNG Sau-lan, Susanna, S.B.S., J.P.
- Mr. CHUNG Man-kit, Ivan, S.B.S., J.P.
- Dr. CHOW Kit-bing, Jennifer, S.B.S., M.H.
- Ms. TAN Chong-chong, S.B.S.
- Mr. WONG Leung-pak, Matthew, S.B.S.
- Mr. KONG Hok-lai, Kelvin, S.B.S., P.M.S.M.
- Ms. KONG Man-wai, Vivian, S.B.S., M.H.
- Ms. CHUNG Lai-ling, S.B.S.

== See also ==
- Bronze Bauhinia Star
- Gold Bauhinia Star
- Orders, decorations, and medals of Hong Kong
