= Hong Kong Bird Watching Society =

Environmental non-governmental organisation

The Hong Kong Bird Watching Society (HKBWS; Chinese: 香港觀鳥會; Jyutping: hoeng1 gong2 gun1 niu5 wui6) is an environmental non-governmental organization dedicated to the conservation of birds and their habitats in Hong Kong. It is a BirdLife International affiliated organisation. The emblem of the HKBWS is the Chinese egret, which visits Hong Kong on migration and used to breed in the territory.

== Development ==
The HKBWS was formed in 1957. It publishes the annual Hong Kong Bird Report and regular bulletins.

In 1994, BirdLife International was established, and HKBWS became their Affiliate.

In 1999, the HKBWS China Conservation Fund was established to support and promote birdwatching and the research work of birdwatchers and ornithologists in mainland China.

In 2002, HKBWS was recognized as an approved public charitable institution.

As of 2013, it had over 1800 members, employed four full-time staff, held regular meetings, conducted surveys and organised birdwatching tours.

== Activities ==
The activities are composed of three sections: conversation, research, and education.

As for conversation and research, it conserves the Long Valley agricultural wetland, where it monitors the birds. Its research programs include monitoring waterfowl at the Mai Po Marshes and Deep Bay, reviewing Hong Kong bird records and maintaining a checklist, studying the wintering ecology of black-faced spoonbills and conducting breeding bird surveys at the Tai Po Kau Forest Reserve.

The society is a pioneer of Citizen Science projects in Hong Kong, with their bird survey data going back to 1958, and they are now utilizing apps and carrying out several Citizen Science events, such as their yearly sparrow census. The society also presents HKBWS views on local development plans and provides professional comments to the government on conservation action, birds and habitat protection. It hosts the Hong Kong Big Bird Race, an annual fundraising activity for wildlife and habitat conservation of WWF HK. It became an International representation in BirdLife International and the Oriental Bird Club. Society also compiles the Asia Red Data Book and the Important Bird Area.

HKBWS educates in two main ways: promoting bird watching activities and organizing indoor meetings. For bird watching Activities, HKBWS organizes bird watching activities every month at Hong Kong Birding Sites, including Hong Kong Island, Hong Kong Park, Lung Fu Shan, Aberdeen Reservoirs, The Peak, and Mount Davis, each of which targets different bird species. The application is made on a first-come, first-served basis. In addition, HKBWS holds indoor meetings regularly, and topics are usually related to birdwatching, ornithology and nature conservation.

== China Programme ==
HKBWS conducts birdwatching and bird conservation activities in mainland China. It has helped establish more than 20 bird watching societies in cities and provinces in mainland, and has trained hundreds of citizen conservationists to participate in bird surveys, the identification and management of Important Bird Areas, and the conservation of threatened species.

According to HKBWS, the China Programme aims to:

- Support the emergence of civil society organizations with an interest in, and concern for, China's birds and the environment, given that China has an incredibly diverse and rich biodiversity, but rapid economic development is placing increasing pressure on the country's environment
- Support the development of birdwatching and bird conservation in mainland China, with the participation of the Chinese public
- Raise awareness of the importance of birds and key areas for conservation
- Build capacity for species and site conservation, education and organizational management
- Promote the development of bird monitoring and site-conservation activities

At least 23 emerging or established Chinese bird-watching societies have participated in activities organised by the Prorammme, including training workshops in waterbird and forest bird survey techniques, environmental education and Important Bird Areas.

HKBWS was incorporated in 2002 as a limited company and was at the same time approved as a charitable organisation of a public character.
