= Hui Chiu-yin =

Hui Chiu-yin BBS (Chinese: 許招賢) (1941 – 5 March 2022), also known as John Hui, was the director and general manager of New World First Ferry in Hong Kong after his retirement from the post of Chief Superintendent of Marine Regional in Hong Kong Police Force in 1996.

He had been the Chief Commissioner of The Scout Association of Hong Kong from 1997 to 2003.

== Civic Service ==
Graduated from the King's College, Hong Kong and the Northcote College of Education, Hui started his education career before influenced by his fellow schoolmate Eddie Hui to join the Hong Kong Police Force in 1965 as a Probationary lnspector of Police, and rose to the rank of Chief Superintendent of Police as the Deputy Regional Commander, Marine before retirement.

== Scout ==
In 1956, Hui joined the 7th Hong Kong Group at the age of 14. Hui was awarded the Queen's Scout in 1960 when he was in the 7th Hong Kong Group of Hong Kong Scout Association in 1960 and became a scout leader later. He severed in the Island North District in the 1960s, and the Hong Kong Island Region in 1979.

He succeeded Chau Cham-son to be the Chief Commission from January 1, 1997. He successfully met the target to increase the number of Scouts to 83,000 in 2002. There are several major events during his commissionership, namely 19th Asia-Pacific Regional Scout Conference in 1998, The Scout Association of Hong Kong Millennium Jamboree from 1999 to 2000, 45th Baden-Powell World Fellowship Event in 2002 and The Scout Association of Hong Kong 90th Anniversary Jamboree in 2003. A new region, New Territories East Region is spin off from New Territories Region in 2000. His appointment ended on December 31, 2003 and was succeeded by Pau Shiu-hung.

He was a member of the Regional Scout Committee of Asia Pacific Region of the World Organization of the Scout Movement from 2001 to 2007. He had also been the Vice chairperson of the APR Scout Financial Resource Sub-committee.

== New World First Ferry ==
After his retirement from Hong Kong Police Force, he was invited to join New World First Ferry in 1996 as he is familiar with the matters of Outlying Island. He instituted a multi-million (Hong Kong) dollar reform of the ferry, including the replacement of twelve hovercraft to increase the navigation stability.

He had increased media exposure following the widely reported ferry accident which occurred on May 12, 2006.

== Award ==
He received a Bronze Bauhinia Star from the Hong Kong Government in 2003 for his outstanding contribution for youth development and scouting movement in the Hong Kong SAR.
