= Hong Kong Chief Commissioner =

Chief Commissioner (Chinese: 香港總監), usually abbreviated as CC, is an administrative head of The Scout Association of Hong Kong appointed by Hong Kong Chief Scout. It was formerly known as Colony Commissioner. The first commissioner, Alexander Anderson McHardy, was appointed on 1 May 1914 when Hong Kong Branch was formally registered at The Scout Association.

The current Chief Commissioner is Chan Kit Chu.

== List of Chief Commissioners and Colony Commissioners ==
- Major Alexander Anderson McHardy (1914 - 1915)
- Vice Admiral Robert Hamilton Anstruther (1915 - 1920)
- Lieutenant Colonel F. J. Bowen (1920 - 1921)
- Rev. George Turner Waldegrave (1921 - 1934)
- Rt. Rev. Bishop Victor Halward (1934 - 1950)
- Quah Chow Cheung (1950 - 1953)
- D. W. Luke (1953 - 1954)
- J. W. Cockburn (1954 - 1963)
- Chi Kin Lo J.P. (1963 - 1973)
- H. C. Ma J.P. (1973 - 1984)
- Chau Cham Son O.B.E., J.P. (1985 - 1996)
- Hui Chiu Yin, John BBS, CPM (1997 - 2003)
- Pau Shiu Hung SBS (2004 - 2007)
- Chan Kit Chu PMSM (2007 - 2011)
- Cheung Chi Sun (2011–2015)
- Ng Ah-ming (2015–2019)
- Joseph Lau (2019–2023)
- Wilson Lai Wai-sang, IMSM (2023–Present)
