= Seamen's Institute =

Hong Kong seamen training school

Coordinates: 22.2790°N 114.1701°E

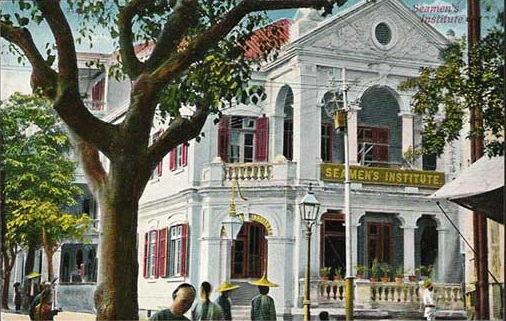
- Traditional Chinese: 海員訓練學校
Transcriptions
Yue: Cantonese
- Yale Romanization: Hói yùhn fan lihn hohk haauh
- Jyutping: Hoi^{2} jyun^{4} fan^{3} lin^{6} hok^{6} haau^{6}

Seamen's Institute (Chinese: 海員訓練學校) was an institute training seamen in Hong Kong. It was located at 8, Praya East which is now the Harcourt Building at Gloucester Road, Wan Chai.

In the early days of Hong Kong Scouting, the Boy Scouts Association, Hong Kong Branch conducted non-regular activities in the institute. The Colony Commissioner, the Reverend George Turner Waldegrave, of the branch was the chaplain in charge of the Seamen's Institute.
