= Quah Chow Cheung =

Quah, Cheow Cheang (Chinese: 柯昭璋, 8 June 1913 in Penang – 1965 in Hong Kong) was the Colony Commissioner of The Scout Association of Hong Kong from 1950 to 1953, succeeding Victor Halward. He was the first Chinese Colony Commissioner in Hong Kong Scouting. Before that appointment, he was appointed by Halward as one of two Chinese District Commissioner and cared the development of Scouting in Kowloon and south New Territories of Hong Kong.

During the Battle of Hong Kong in World War II, Quah was a Lance Corporal in Hong Kong Volunteer Defence Corps. He was hurt in the defense of Stonecutter's Island and escaped the next attack by Japanese forces in Wong Nai Chung Gap in December 1941. After the surrender of Japan in 1945, he and Halward actively re-established Scouting in Hong Kong.
