= George Waldegrave =

George Waldegrave may refer to:

- George Waldegrave (MP for Sudbury), represented Sudbury (UK Parliament constituency)
- George Turner Waldegrave (1889–1966), vicar involved with Scouting
- George Waldegrave, 4th Earl Waldegrave (1751–1789), British politician
- George Waldegrave, 5th Earl Waldegrave (1784–1794), British peer
- George Waldegrave, 7th Earl Waldegrave (1816–1846), British peer
