= Para-balloon =

Tool used for children's games

A para-balloon is a tool used in a variety of games. It appears as a parachute shape and is composed of fragments of colorful cloth in multiple, bright colours.

== Origin ==
An unknown Japanese visitor saw a game involving a parachute at a YMCA in the United States in October 1960 and also in Los Angeles and was attracted to it. In the hope that children could play the game he returned to Japan and searched unsuccessfully for a similar style of parachute. He later came to know that there were many good shoemakers in Kobe. He asked them to make 20 pieces and design games involving the parachute. He named it as the "Para-balloon" as a combined form of the words "Parachute" and "Balloon".

== Use ==
A para-balloon is the symbol of Grasshopper Scouts from The Scout Association of Hong Kong. It is used to train groups of children aged 6 to 8. The association uses the name 快樂傘 in Chinese. Many schools, kindergartens and youth centers utilize para-balloons, following the Grasshopper Scouts.

Para-balloon games are sometimes incorporated in physical exercises for elderly people in Hong Kong.
