= Hong Kong Coliseum =

Multi-purpose indoor arena

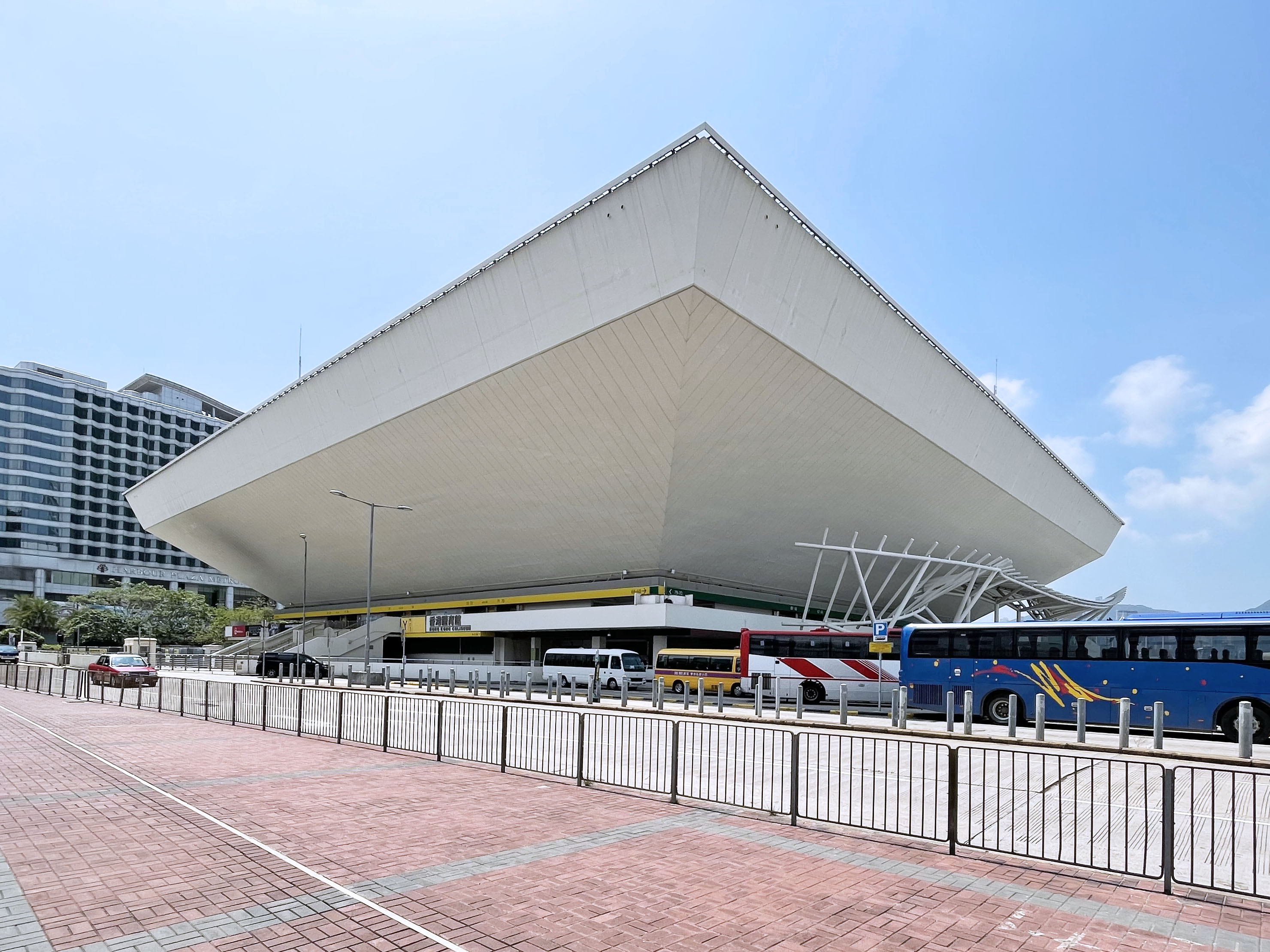
- Hong Kong Coliseum (May 2022)
- Interactive map of the Hong Kong Coliseum area
- Alternative names: Hung Hom Coliseum

General information
- Architectural style: Minimalism
- Location: Hung Hom Bay, Kowloon, Hong Kong, 9 Cheong Wan Road
- Coordinates: 22°18′5.33″N 114°10′55.23″E
- Construction started: March 1973; 53 years ago
- Completed: August 1981; 44 years ago
- Inaugurated: 27 April 1983; 43 years ago
- Renovated: 2008; 18 years ago
- Cost: HK$ 140 000 000; HK$ 168 600 000 (2008-2009 renovation)
- Client: Urban Council
- Operator: Leisure and Cultural Service Department

Technical details
- Structural system: reinforced concrete

Design and construction
- Architect: Pau Shiu-hung
- Architecture firm: Architectural Services Department
- Main contractor: Urban Council

Other information
- Seating capacity: 12,500

Website
- www.lcsd.gov.hk/en/hkc/index.html

Hong Kong Coliseum
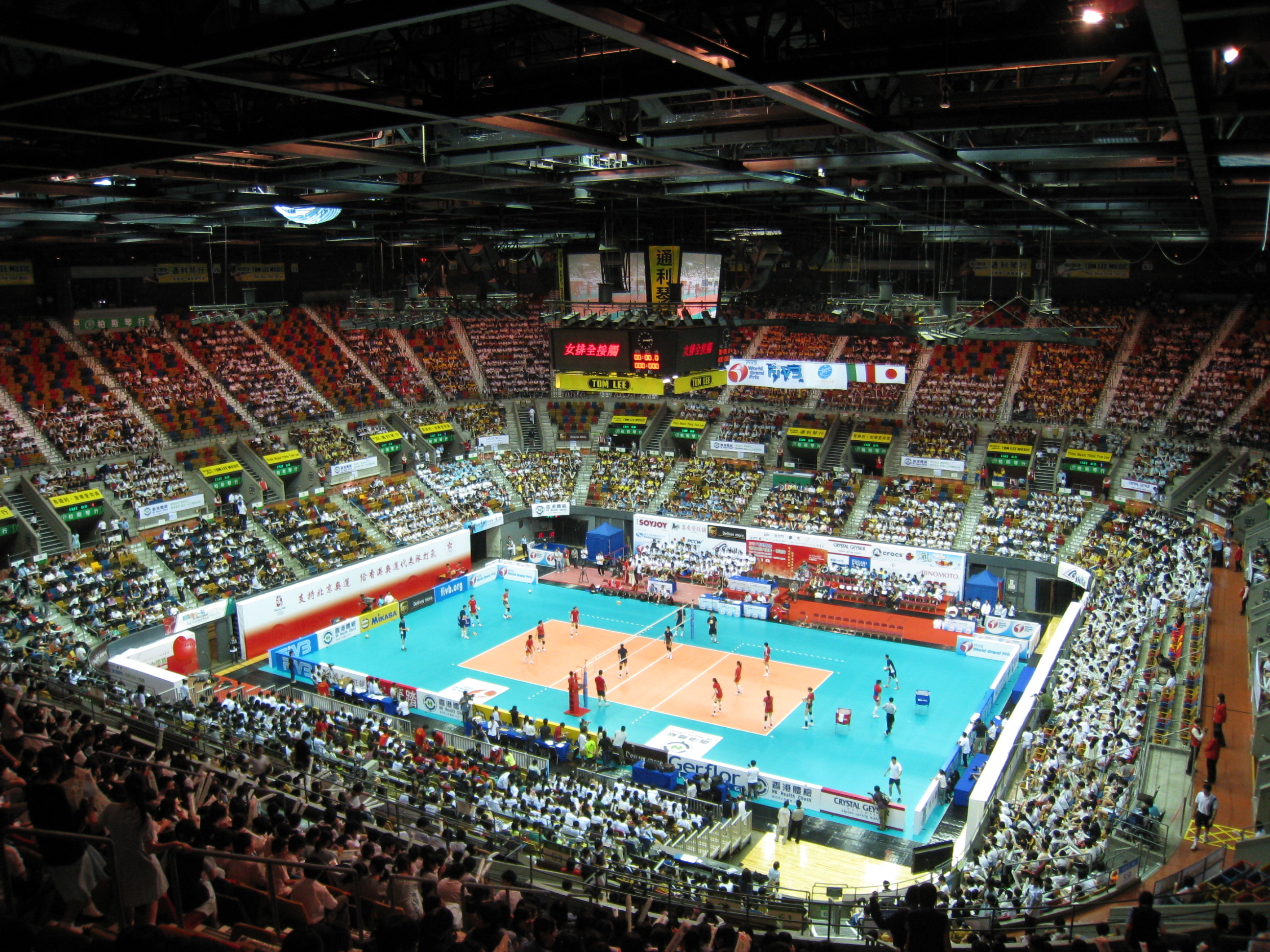
- Inside the Hong Kong Coliseum, during the FIVB World Grand Prix
- Traditional Chinese: 香港體育館
- Simplified Chinese: 香港体育馆
- Cantonese Yale: Hēunggóng Táiyuhkgún
Transcriptions
Standard Mandarin
- Hanyu Pinyin: Xiānggǎng Tǐyùguǎn
Yue: Cantonese
- Yale Romanization: Hēunggóng Táiyuhkgún
- Jyutping: Hoeng1gong2 Tai2juk6gun2
- IPA: [hœ̂ːŋkɔ̌ːŋ.tǎːijùːkkʊ̌n]

Hung Hom Coliseum
- Traditional Chinese: 紅磡體育館
- Simplified Chinese: 红磡体育馆
- Cantonese Yale: Hùhngham Táiyuhkgún
Transcriptions
Standard Mandarin
- Hanyu Pinyin: Hóng Kàn Tǐyùguǎn
Yue: Cantonese
- Yale Romanization: Hùhngham Táiyuhkgún
- Jyutping: Hung4ham3 Tai2juk6gun2

Second alternative Chinese name
- Traditional Chinese: 紅館
- Simplified Chinese: 红馆
- Cantonese Yale: Hùhnggún
Transcriptions
Standard Mandarin
- Hanyu Pinyin: Hóng Guǎn
Yue: Cantonese
- Yale Romanization: Hùhnggún
- Jyutping: Hung4gun2

Hong Kong Coliseum (Chinese: 香港體育館), commonly and informally known as the Hung Hom Coliseum (紅磡體育館, 紅館) is a multi-purpose indoor arena, in Hung Hom Bay, Kowloon, Hong Kong near Hung Hom station. It is in Yau Tsim Mong District.

It was built by the Urban Council and inaugurated on 27 April 1983. The opening of the stadium coincided with the 100th anniversary of the Urban Council. The coliseum has 12,500 seats, which is the second largest among indoor facilities in Hong Kong, only behind the 2005 AsiaWorld–Arena.

It is managed by the Leisure and Cultural Service Department of the Hong Kong Government.

== Design and Facilities ==
Pau Shiu-hung, the former Director of Architectural Services of HKSAR Government, is considered the main designer of the Hong Kong Coliseum.

The Hong Kong Coliseum consists of a large arena and a number of conference rooms.

=== Arena ===
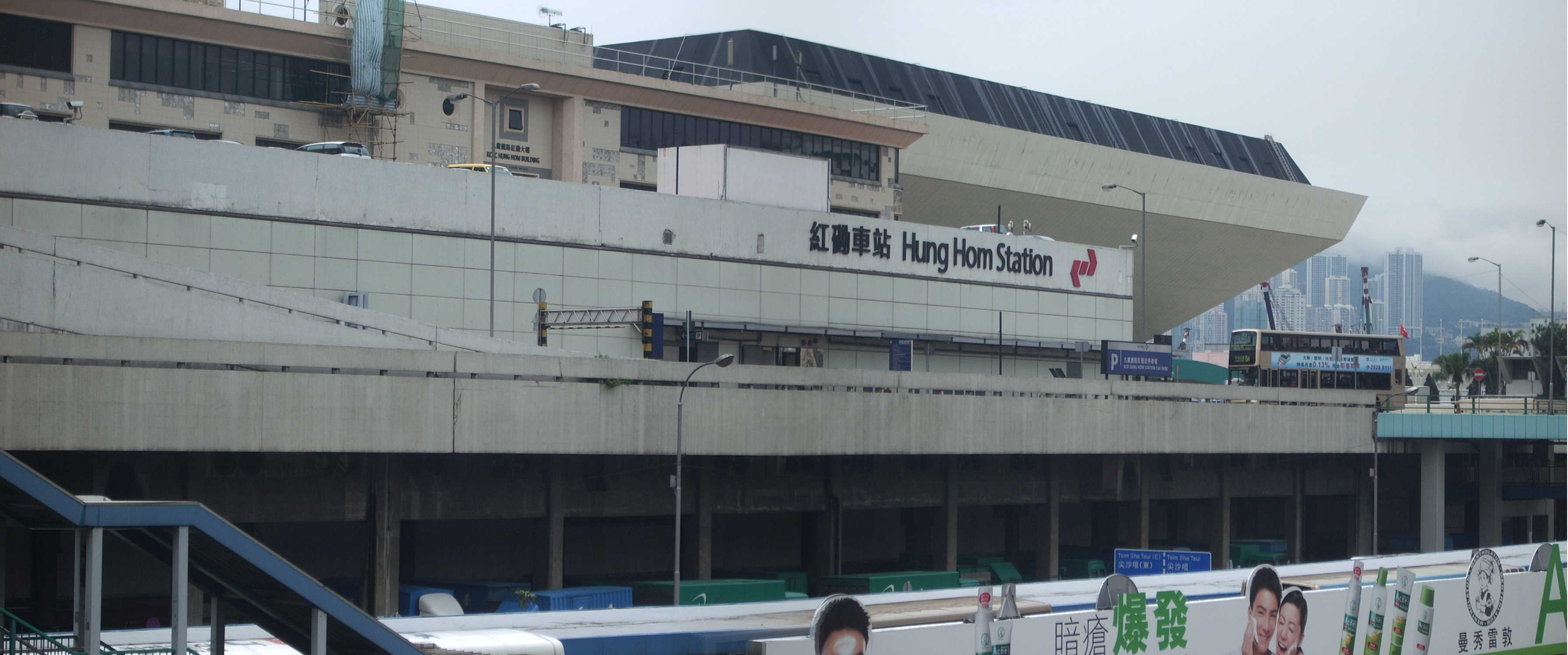
Hong Kong Coliseum, the inverted pyramid-like construction, right behind the former KCR Hung Hom station.

The arena floor is a rectangular shape with seats surrounding it on all four sides, the highest and furthest rows rising up to 41 metres (134’6”). The entire facility has a concrete cement flooring.

During performances, the floor may be covered with different overmounted floorings, such as demountable wooden flooring or various rubberized roll-outs. This facilitates the set-up of sporting equipment or the execution of different athletic events, such as futsal, badminton, basketball, volleyball and ice-skating.

Moreover, the floor can hold strong pressures up to 1,800 kg/m^{2}, which cannot even be done by industrial buildings. This facilitates the setup of music and performance stages, platforms and large pieces of sound and set equipment for concerts and any other live entertainment that requires an elevated stage and good audio and PA (public address) systems.

Strategically placed speaker systems, among other sound equipment, and a four-sided, colour television screen projector system (suspended from the centre of the arena ceiling) are also available, to project the event's live footage onto a screen, and to allow any member of the audience sitting at the furthest points of the stadium to hear and see clearly.

=== Conference Rooms ===
The Hong Kong Coliseum offers both open and sheltered areas for holding conventions and conferences. The demountable open stage provides the arena with an excellent forum for public assemblies as well as staging live television broadcasts of opening ceremonies.

=== Reception Room ===
The reception room acts as an assistant facility for hirers of the arena and the conference rooms to accommodate visiting VIPs. The room can hold 60 persons.

== Events ==
Even though its formal name in Chinese roughly translates to "Sports Arena", the venue frequently serves as a concert venue for popular singers. In addition, some universities rent it every year for congregation. Some performances like ice-skating also choose Hong Kong Coliseum as their stages. It was also used every year from 1991 to 2010 to hold the Miss Hong Kong Pageant, except for 2008.

It also hosts a part of the FIVB Volleyball Women's Nations League (before: FIVB World Grand Prix) for volleyball every year.

David Bowie played the two final dates of his 1983 Serious Moonlight Tour at the venue. The final date - December 8 - was the third anniversary of John Lennon's death and to signify that, Bowie played Lennon's "Imagine".

On 3 June 2001, Irish vocal pop band Westlife held a concert for their Where Dreams Come True Tour supporting their album Coast to Coast.

In November 1988, it was a venue for three days (18-20th) of Whitney Houston's Moment of Truth World Tour performance. Other performers at the Coliseum in the late 1980s and early 1990s included Stevie Wonder, Phil Collins, and Kylie Minogue.

=== Venue for 2009 East Asian Games ===
The Hong Kong Coliseum was one of the venues for the 5th East Asian Games that was hosted in Hong Kong in 2009.

A HK$168.6 million makeover was undergone to ensure that the coliseum would be up to international standards for competition. The makeover included:

- The Renovation and refurbishment of all front desk and VIP reception facilities
- The improvement and upgrade of existing support and back office facilities
- The replacement and improvement lighting systems
- The replacement of all approximately 10,500 fixed seats at the performance venue
- The replacement of existing scoreboards
- Provide facilities and decorations for ceremonies
- The repainting of the seats to four colours and dividing into four zones according to colour

The makeover lasted for 6 months spanning from 1 July 2008 to 27 January 2009, during which the Coliseum had to be closed. It was reopened on 28 January 2009.

== Accident ==
On 28 July 2022, during a concert by local boy band Mirror, a moving, elevated giant TV-screen fell from the ceiling of the venue and landed directly on a dancer's head, and further collapsed onto a second dancer. Both dancers were immediately taken to hospital, with one being in serious condition admitted to the Intensive Care Unit, and the other being stable. All remaining concerts had to be cancelled and investigations were initiated by the government.

== See also ==
- Hong Kong Esports Festival

Events and tenants
| Preceded by Rotterdam Ahoy Sportpaleis; Rotterdam | FIFA Futsal World Championship; Final Venue; 1992 | Succeeded by Palau Sant Jordi; Barcelona |
