= Grasshopper Scouts =

1985 Beaver Scouts section of Hong Kong

Grasshopper Scouts (Chinese: 小童軍), Grasshopper Section, or simply Grasshopper, is a Scout section of The Scout Association of Hong Kong for 4- to 8-year-old boys and girls in Hong Kong. Established in 1985, the Grasshoppers are modeled after the Beaver Scouts from the United Kingdom. Grasshopper is the youngest section in Hong Kong Scouting and the second largest section after the Cub Scout Section.

Grasshopper Scout units are designated as "rings". At the age of 7½, participants can be promoted into Cub Scouts. Scouts wear the World Scout emblem and are formal members of the World Organization of the Scout Movement.

== History ==
In the early 1980s, the Hong Kong Scouting Association launched a full-scale review of its Scout programmes. A reform programme named Project Rainbow (天虹計劃) was initiated in 1982 with the purpose of providing children under 8 years old an opportunity to join the Scouts. The reform was inspired by the United Kingdom's Scout Association, which was the closest system to Hong Kong Scouting. Several tenets of the UK programme were adopted by the Hong Kong association during the 1980's. Two notable changes made during this time were an age extension for eligible children and the inclusion of female Scouts. By 1985 Project Rainbow had become a success, finishing out the Scouts organizational overhaul with a fifth section.

In 1987, the Hong Kong Scouting Association published the first programme guide for the Grasshoppers. A para-balloon (快樂傘) was selected as the symbol of the Section; this symbol makes regular appearances during Grasshopper Scout meetings.

== Promise, law, yell and motto ==
'The promise'

- "I promise to be a Grasshopper Scout, to love God, to love people and to love my country" (in Chinese: 我願參加小童軍，愛神愛人愛國家).

Before 12 January 2001, the words Country and 國家 were Hong Kong and 香港 respectively.

'The Law'

- "A Grasshopper Scout does a good turn every day" (in Chinese: 小童軍日行一善).

'The Yell'

- "A Grasshopper Scout Goes Forward" (in Chinese: 小童軍向前進).

'The Motto'

- "Forward" (in Chinese: 前進).

== Ceremonies ==
Grasshopper Scout sections have no formal ceremonies. Every ceremony is simple, serious and short. The most important ceremony is the induction ceremony. Other common ceremonies conducted at the meetings include a welcome ceremony, a goodbye ceremony, presentation of progressive badges, welcoming of guests, special events (such as an anniversary ceremony), departure from the Grasshopper Scout ring and promotion to the Cub Scout pack. Because children between six and eight years of age cannot concentrate for extended periods of time, Grasshopper Scout ceremonies should not take longer than five minutes.

The association suggests that, when inducting new members, three to four new members should be inducted together and no member should be inducted individually.

== Organisation ==
Most Grosshopper rings are organised by primary schools and the community centres of NGOs in Hong Kong. Some Scout groups also establish independent sections.

A ring is run by a Grasshopper scout leader with the help of assistant leaders and instructors. It is part of a Scout group that might have other sections like Cub Scout, Scout, Venture Scout and Rover Scout. Generally, each ring meets once a week for an hour. As in all scouting programmes, Grasshopper Scouting is fun and a large part of training is done through games.

== Badges ==
Four progressive badges are designated for the section programme to encourage members' active participation. They are square badges with four footprints coloured red, brown, blue and green progressively. The badges are awarded according to the number of hours that members have participated.

== Uniform ==
The official Grasshopper Scouting uniform consists of only a group scarf. However, most rings also design their own T-shirts for the sake of uniformity. Badges of different kinds can be attached to the T-shirts.

== See also ==
- Beaver Scouts (The Scout Association)
- Beaver Scouts (Scouting Ireland)
