= Robert Hamilton Anstruther =

Royal Navy Admiral (1862-1938)

Admiral Robert Hamilton Anstruther CMG
- Born: 10 June 1862
- Died: 26 September 1938 (aged 76)
- Spouse: Edith Flora Peel (m. 1890)

Admiral Robert Hamilton Anstruther, CMG (Chinese: 安史導; 10 June 1862 – 26 September 1938) was a Royal Navy officer.

Anstruther was the son of Lieutenant-Colonel Sir Robert Anstruther of Balcaskie, 5th Bt. and Louisa Maria Chowne Marshall. He married Edith Flora Peel on 6 January 1890. Their son, Colonel Philip Noel Anstruther, was born on 2 September 1891.

Anstruther joined the Royal Navy, was promoted to lieutenant on 30 June 1885, and to Commander on 31 December 1897. He was posted to the cruiser HMS Edgar on 20 February 1900, for a relief mission to the China station. He was Senior Naval Officer on the Danube between 1900 and 1902, and was in command of the gunboat HMS Cockatrice from 5 January 1901 to 5 February 1902. On 5 July 1902 he was appointed in command of the surveying ship HMS Hearty, and was Senior Naval Officer of the North Sea Fisheries between 1902 and 1904. He was Senior Naval Officer of the Newfoundland Fisheries between 1906 and 1908. He was invested as a Companion, Order of St. Michael and St. George (CMG) in 1907. He was Commodore-in-Charge, Hong Kong from July 1912 to May 1916. He was Senior Officer of the coast of China between 1914 and 1916.

He was the second Colony Commissioner of the Boy Scout Association, Hong Kong Branch as of May 1915.
