= Pau Shiu-hung =

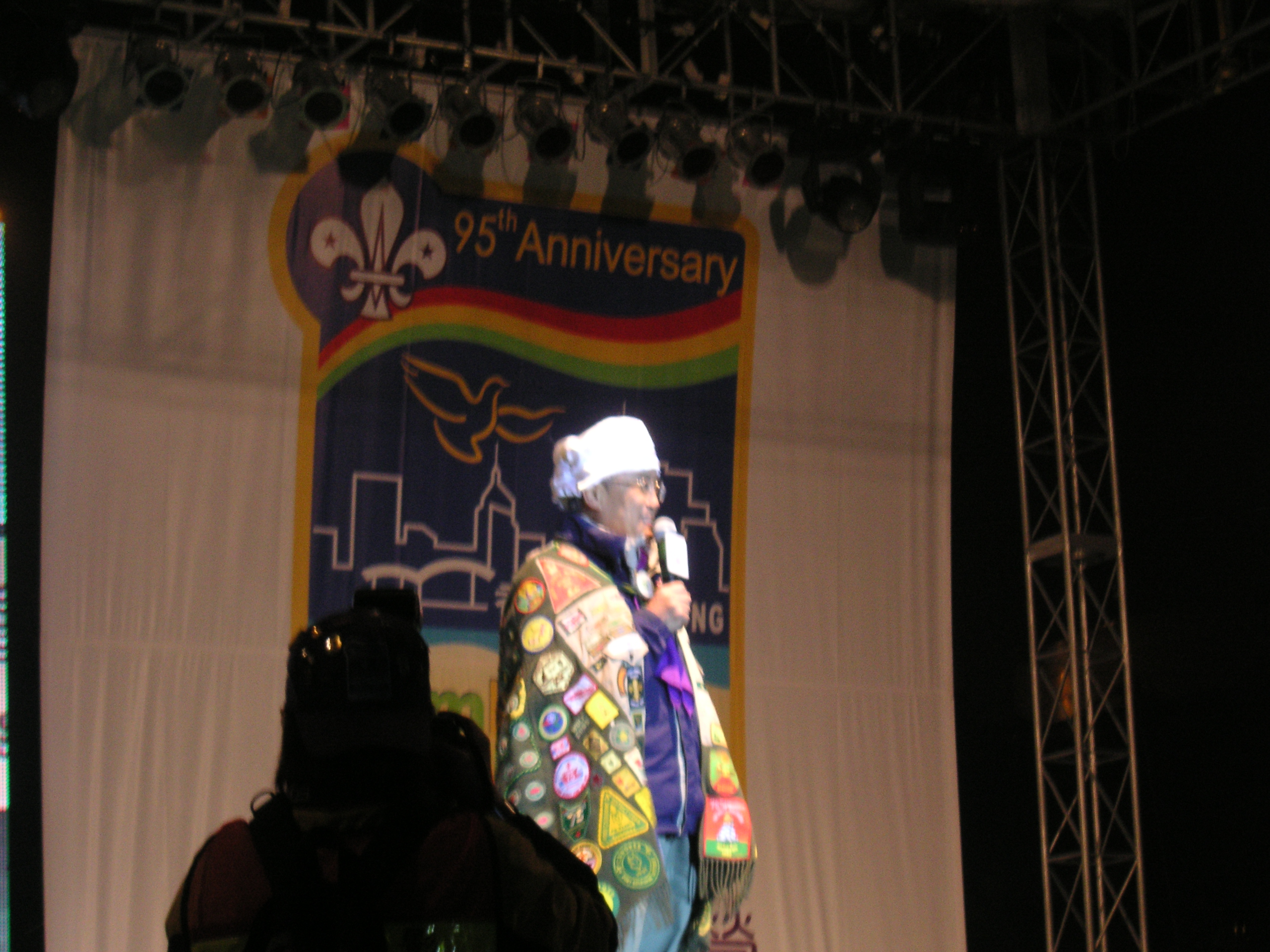
Pau Siu-hung at Metropolitan Jamboree

Pau Shiu-hung, SBS, (Chinese: 鮑紹雄, born 1942) is the former Director of Architectural Services of HKSAR Government. He is considered as the main designer of the Hong Kong Coliseum.

He was also the chief commissioner of the Scout Association of Hong Kong, appointed on 1 January 2004 by then-Chief Executive of Hong Kong and Chief Scout of Hong Kong Tung Chee-hwa.

== Life ==
Pau was born in 1942. He received his primary education at Lai Chack Primary School, secondary education at La Salle College and tertiary education at the University of Hong Kong. Graduated in 1967, he joined the Architectural Office, a branch of the Public Works Services in Hong Kong Government. He was appointed as the Director of Architectural Services in 1997 and retired in 2003. He was also the Vice President of the Hong Kong Science and Technology Parks Corporation.

In his 30-year service and contribution in Hong Kong Government, he was awarded the Silver Bauhinia Star in 2002.

He is a member of the La Salle Foundation of the La Salle College and used to be a member of the Lotteries Fund Advisory Committee.

== Scouting ==
Pau joined Wolf Cub, present-day Cub Scout Section at the age of 9. He succeedingly was a Boy Scout and Venture Scout. He later became troop leader of these two sections. He achieved the Queen's Scout Award (currently Dragon Scout Award) in 1961.

He continued his Scout life and served as an Assistant Venture Scout Leader of the 17th Kowloon (La Salle) Group at age of 21 in 1963 and promoted to be the Venture Scout Leader in 1968, and also served as District Venture Scout Leader of Kowloon City District.

He joined Estate Branch of the Association at 1971. He was appointed vice chairman of Campsites and Properties Committee, and served as chairman of Building Sub-Committee and vice chairman of Camp Management Sub-Committee during that period. In 1993, he became the assistant chief commissioner (estate). He succeeded John C. Y. Hui as chief commissioner in 2004. He is currently the Vice-president and the Vice-chairman of Headquarters Tender Board of the Scout Association of Hong Kong.
