= Alexander Anderson McHardy =

Major-General Alexander Anderson McHardy CB CMG DSO MBE

Colony Commissioner of the Boy Scout Association, Hong Kong Branch
- In office 1914–1915

Personal details
- Born: 9 November 1868
- Died: 11 November 1958 (aged 90)
- Spouse: Lillian McHardy (m. 1904)
- Military career
- Allegiance: United Kingdom
- Branch: Royal Artillery
- Rank: Major-General
- Units: Malakand Field Force; Buner Field Force; Royal Garrison Artillery
- Conflicts: First Mohmand campaign Second Boer War; World War II

Major-General Alexander Anderson McHardy, CB, CMG, DSO, MBE 9 November 1868 – 11 November 1958) was a British Army officer and Scout.

== Career ==
McHardy was the son of Lieutenant-Colonel Sir Alexander Burness McHardy and Elsie Norrie Anderson. He was married to Lilian Amy McHardy in 1904.

He was commissioned a second lieutenant in the Royal Artillery on 17 February 1888, and promoted to lieutenant on 17 February 1891. Serving in the campaign on the North West Frontier of India in 1897–98, he was with the Malakand Field Force and was present in the engagement at Landakai and in the operations in Bajaur and in the Mamund Country; then with the Buner Field Force including the capture of the Tanga pass; for which he received the medal with clasp. Promotion to captain followed on 17 August 1898. He served in the Second Boer War in South Africa 1899–1900 as a Divisional Signalling Officer 5th Infantry Division, and was later appointed Deputy Assistant Adjutant General for intelligence for South Africa. He was mentioned in despatches (including the final despatch by Lord Kitchener dated 23 June 1902), and received the Distinguished Service Order (DSO) for his service. Following the end of the war in South Africa, he returned to the Royal Garrison Artillery in July 1902.

He was seconded for service in British Somaliland in January 1903.

McHardy was the first Colony Commissioner of the Boy Scout Association, Hong Kong Branch in 1914 and 1915.

He then went to France and participated in World War I. He was made a Companion of the Order of St Michael and St George (CMG) in June 1916.

He was promoted to major general on 2 June 1924.

== Honours and awards ==
- Companion of the Order of the Bath (CB) London Gazette 1 January 1918 page 2 King's New Year's Honours List for Distinguished service in France.
- Companion of the Order of St Michael and St George (CMG) London Gazette 3 June 1916 page 5559 King's Birthday Honours List for Distinguished Service in France.
- Distinguished Service Order (DSO) for Distinguished Services in South Africa.
- Member of the Order of the British Empire (MBE) London Gazette 9 January 1946 page 298 (“Lt General Alexander Anderson McHardy, CB, CMG, DSO, lately Air Raid Precautions Area Sub Controller, Norfolk”.)

Mentioned in Despatches

- London Gazette 8 February 1901 page 978 (South Africa)
- London Gazette 8 February 1901 page 381 (South Africa)
- London Gazette 29 July 1902 page 4840 (South Africa)
- London Gazette 22 February 1915 page 5978 (French, France)
- London Gazette 15 June 1916 page 5921 (Haig, France)
- London Gazette 4 January 1917 page 199 (Haig, France)
- London Gazette 15 May 1917 page 4750 (Haig, France)
- London Gazette 11 December 1917 page 12917 (Haig, France)
- London Gazette 20 December 1918 page 14931 (Haig, France)
- London Gazette 5 July 1919 page 8496 (Haig, France)

Foreign Decorations

- Belgium Order of Leopold 4th Class London Gazette 7 February 1921 page 1037
- France Croix De Guerre London Gazette 7 June 1919 page 7398
- France Order of Agricultural Merit Commander London Gazette 7 October 1919 page 12408
