= Victor Halward =

English bishop and Scout

Colony Commissioner of The Scout Association of Hong Kong
- In office 1934-1950

Personal details
- Born: 12 December 1897 United Kingdom
- Died: 17 December 1953 (aged 56)
- Education: University of Cambridge
- Military career
- Allegiance: United Kingdom
- Branch: Royal Artillery
- Rank: Lieutenant
- Awards: Military Cross

Nelson Victor Halward MC (Chinese: 侯利華, called Victor; 12 December 1897 – 17 December 1953) was an English Anglican bishop in Hong Kong and British Columbia. He was the Colony Commissioner of the Boy Scout Association, Hong Kong Branch from 1934 to 1950.

== Biography ==
Victor Halward was educated at The King's School, Canterbury. In 1916 he went straight from school into the army, at first in the Royal Artillery, then in 1917 he was commissioned as second lieutenant in the Gloucestershire Regiment. In 1919 he was awarded the Military Cross:

For gallantry and devotion to duty during an attack on [an] enemy position S.W. of Fleurbaix, on 30 September 1918. His platoon was selected to secure and hold an enemy position on a flank, and he pushed them forward and occupied an advanced position, inflicting heavy casualties on the enemy. In face of heavy machine-gun fire and snipers he held on to his position, and it was mainly owing to his coolness and initiative that the remainder of the attacking troops gained their objectives.

In June 1919 Halward was promoted to lieutenant. He then left the army and went up to Jesus College, Cambridge. After graduating he studied theology at Westcott House, Cambridge, and was ordained in the Church of England. He was curate at St Saviour's Church, Croydon, 1922–25, then in 1926 he moved to Hong Kong as Diocesan Chaplain to the Anglican Church there (Chung Hua Sheng Kung Hui). He was also the Scoutmaster of St Paul's College in Hong Kong and was enthusiastic in Scouting activities. He was priest-in-charge in Kowloon Tong 1933–36. From 1936 to 1946 – throughout the Second Sino-Japanese War and World War II – he was based in Canton (now Guangzhou) in southern China as a missionary for the Church Missionary Society, but continued as Hong Kong Colony Commissioner for Boy Scouts despite the Japanese occupation of Hong Kong. During his commissionership, the Scout Movement rooted among the Chinese population in Hong Kong. Halward appointed Chinese district commissioners and they significantly helped to develop Scouting in Hong Kong. Through his connections in Canton he established cooperation with the Scouts of China. He was awarded the Silver Wolf, the highest honour in The Scout Association. During the Japanese occupation Halward was interned in the concentration camp in Canton.

After the war Halward was Assistant Bishop of Victoria (Hong Kong and South China) 1946–51 (for Guangzhou) and Assistant Bishop of British Columbia 1951–53. He was consecrated a bishop on St James's Day 1946 (25 July), by Geoffrey Fisher, Archbishop of Canterbury, at St Paul's Cathedral.
