= Scout Association of Hong Kong =

Scouting organization in Hong Kong

Coordinates: 22°18′11.20″N 114°10′9.63″E

- Chinese: 香港童軍總會
- Headquarters: Hong Kong Scout Centre
- Country: Hong Kong
- Founded: 1 May 1914; 112 years ago (As the Hong Kong Branch of the Boy Scouts Association); 26 April 1977; 49 years ago (as the Scout Association of Hong Kong)
- Founder: The Scout Association of the United Kingdom
- Membership: 98,209
- Chief Commissioner: Wilson Lai Wai-sang, IMSM (黎偉生)
- Affiliation: World Organization of the Scout Movement
- Website scout.org.hk/en/

Scout Association of Hong Kong
- Traditional Chinese: 香港童軍總會
- Simplified Chinese: 香港童军总会
Transcriptions
Standard Mandarin
- Hanyu Pinyin: Xiānggǎng Tóngjūn Zǒnghuì
Yue: Cantonese
- Yale Romanization: Hēung góng tùhng gwān júng wuih
- Jyutping: Hoeng1 gong2 tung4 gwan1 zung2 wui6

The Scout Association of Hong Kong is the largest scouting organisation in Hong Kong. Scout training was first introduced in Hong Kong by Rev Spink of St Andrew's Church, Kowloon in 1909 and 1910 by the Protestant based Boys' Brigade, Chums Scout Patrols and British Boy Scouts. The Catholic St. Joseph's College, formed its Boy Scout Troop in 1913, and registered with the Boy Scouts Association of the United Kingdom in 1914. The Boy Scouts Association formed its Hong Kong Local Association in July 1915 which became its Hong Kong Branch. After changes to the name of the United Kingdom organisation in 1967, the branch name was changed to The Scout Association Hong Kong Branch. In 1977, The Scout Association of Hong Kong was constituted as an autonomous association and successor to The Scout Association's Hong Kong Branch and became the 111th member of the World Organization of the Scout Movement (WOSM) in 1977.

In 2008, the association had 95,877 uniformed members, with approximately 2,700 Scout groups in the sections Grasshopper Scouts, Cubs, Scouts, Venture and Rover Scouts, making it the largest uniformed youth organisation in Hong Kong. The headquarters at the Hong Kong Scout Centre (香港童軍中心) in Tsim Sha Tsui, Kowloon host the administration, headed by the Hong Kong Chief Commissioner (香港總監).

The association runs campsites, including Gilwell Campsite (基維爾營地), Tai Tam Scout Centre (大潭童軍中心) and Tung Tsz Scout Centre (洞梓童軍中心), as well as hostels and Scout Activity Centres. It annually organises the traditional Scout Rally, providing Scout competitions and activities. For specific anniversaries, themed jamborees have been organised.

The Scout movement is the largest uniform group in Hong Kong, consisting of close to 100,000 members.

== History ==
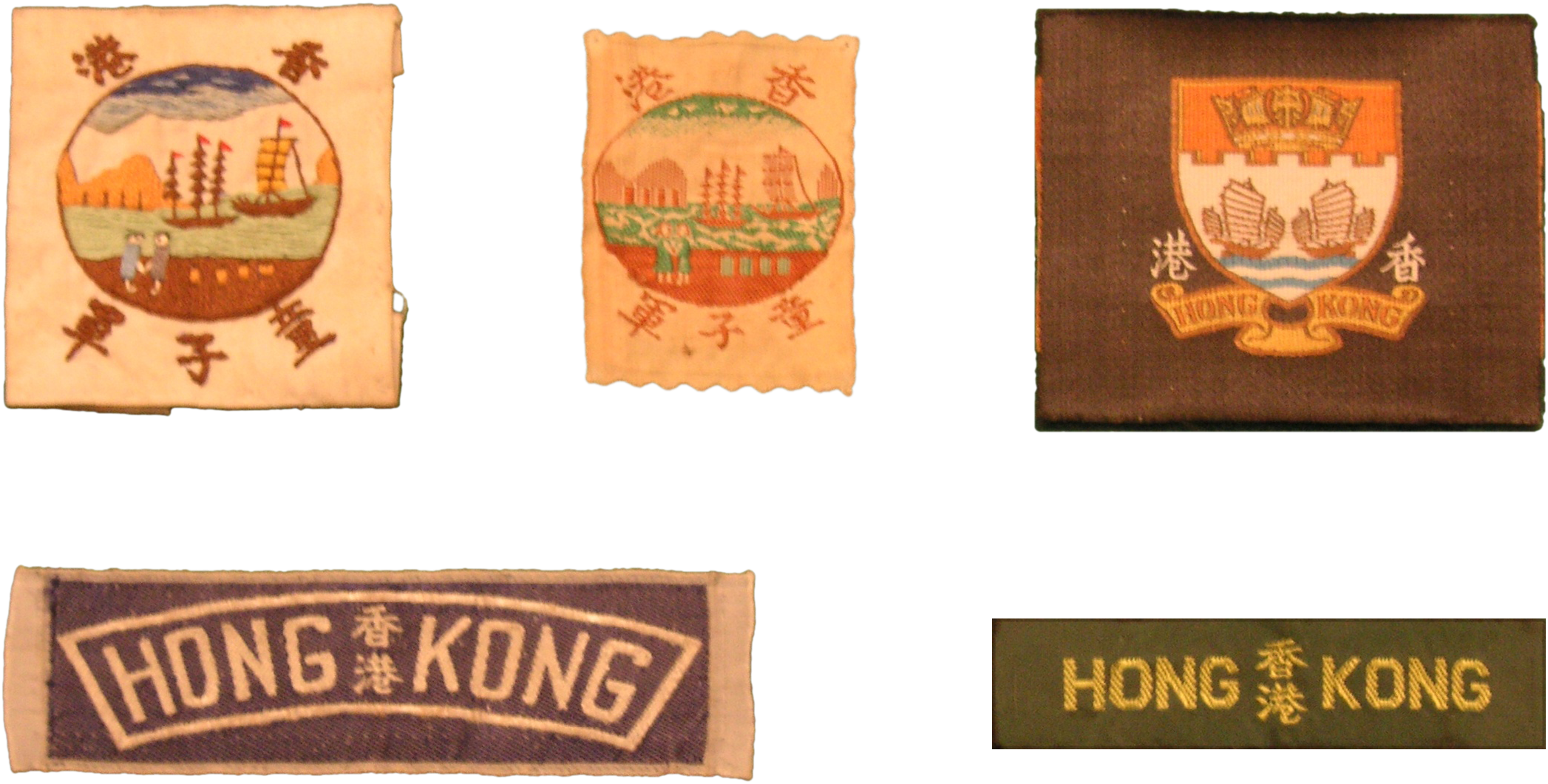
Various old Hong Kong badges

=== Founding of Hong Kong Scouting movement ===
Scout training was first introduced to boys in Hong Kong in 1909 and 1910, only a few years after the beginning of the Scout movement in the United Kingdom, when Rev. Spink started a Boys' Brigade Company attached to the St. Andrew's Church in Kowloon, in response to popular requests for Scouting activities in the expatriate community of Hong Kong. By 1911, British merchants and military personnel had started to organise Boy Scout troops in the city. On 16 April 1912, Lieutenant-General Baden-Powell, Chief Scout of The Boy Scouts Association, arrived in Hong Kong by HMS Lutzou. He was a guest in the Government House and discussed with officials of the Hong Kong Government the establishment of a branch of The Boy Scouts Association of the United Kingdom and the organisation of a Boy Scout Movement in the city. (Note: The early history of Scouting in Hong Kong is difficult to trace because documents and other archived materials were largely destroyed during the Battle of Hong Kong and the subsequent Japanese occupation of Hong Kong. Part of the documents were recovered from the copies and publications in the Scout Association of United Kingdom.)

Enthusiasts and organisations, including Queen's College and St. Joseph's College, established Boy Scout troops. On 20 September 1913, St. Joseph's College formed a Boy Scout troop. Baden-Powell sent a letter of congratulation to the St. Joseph's College Boy Scouts on 26 November 1913, which was published in the first issue of the Scout Gazette, the first Scout publication in Hong Kong. The St. Joseph's College troop was the first affiliated with the Boy Scout Association being registered as the 1st Hong Kong Boy Scout Troop on 1 May 1914. At the time, the Chief Scout was Major F.J. Bowen and the Scoutmaster was Albert Edwards. Besides training in map reading and communication, the troop also provided training in ambulance by Dr Coleman. On 29 December 1914, the troop was extended with a short-life Sea Scout Troop by Capt. P. Streafield, connected to HMS Triumph of the Royal Navy. The Troop also held the first Scout camp in Murray Barracks. At the same time, Bowen was invited to Peak School to educate pupils in Scouting and the school later established a Wolf Cub Pack. The 2nd Hong Kong Scout Troop of St. Andrew's Church was registered on 25 November 1914. Major Alexander Anderson McHardy was appointed Colony Commissioner on 1 May 1914 and then-Governor of Hong Kong Francis Henry May became Chief Scout of Hong Kong. At the beginning all member Scouts were of European descent and not well-recognised by Chinese society. Membership was restricted to those of British nationality. Vice Admiral Robert Hamilton Anstruther succeeded Major McHardy as Colony Commissioner on 1 May 1915. The Boy Scout Association Hong Kong branch started up in July 1915, and was responsible for Scout training. At the end of September 1915, there were in total 155 members in the first census.

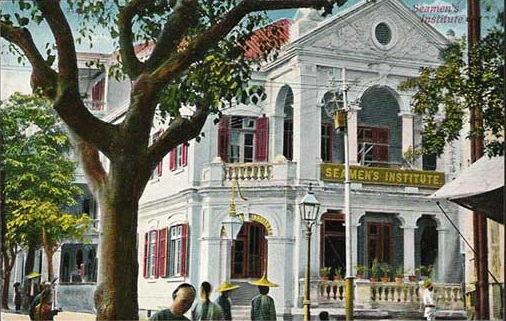
Seamen's Institute in Hong Kong

Seamen's Institute (Chinese: 海員訓練學校) was an institute training seamen in Hong Kong located at 8, Praya East which is now the Harcourt Building at Gloucester Road, Wan Chai. In the early days of The Scout Association of Hong Kong, they conducted non-regular activities in the institute.

=== Growth and development ===
During World War I, many Scouting leaders served in the war, which limited Scouting in Hong Kong, but the 1st World Scout Jamboree between 30 July and 8 August 1920 revived Hong Kong Scouting. Lieutenant-Colonel F. J. Bowen returned to Hong Kong after the end of the war, and actively participated in the Movement. He became the Colony Commissioner in July 1920 and reorganised the Hong Kong Branch. At the end of 1920, membership was approximately 140 members.

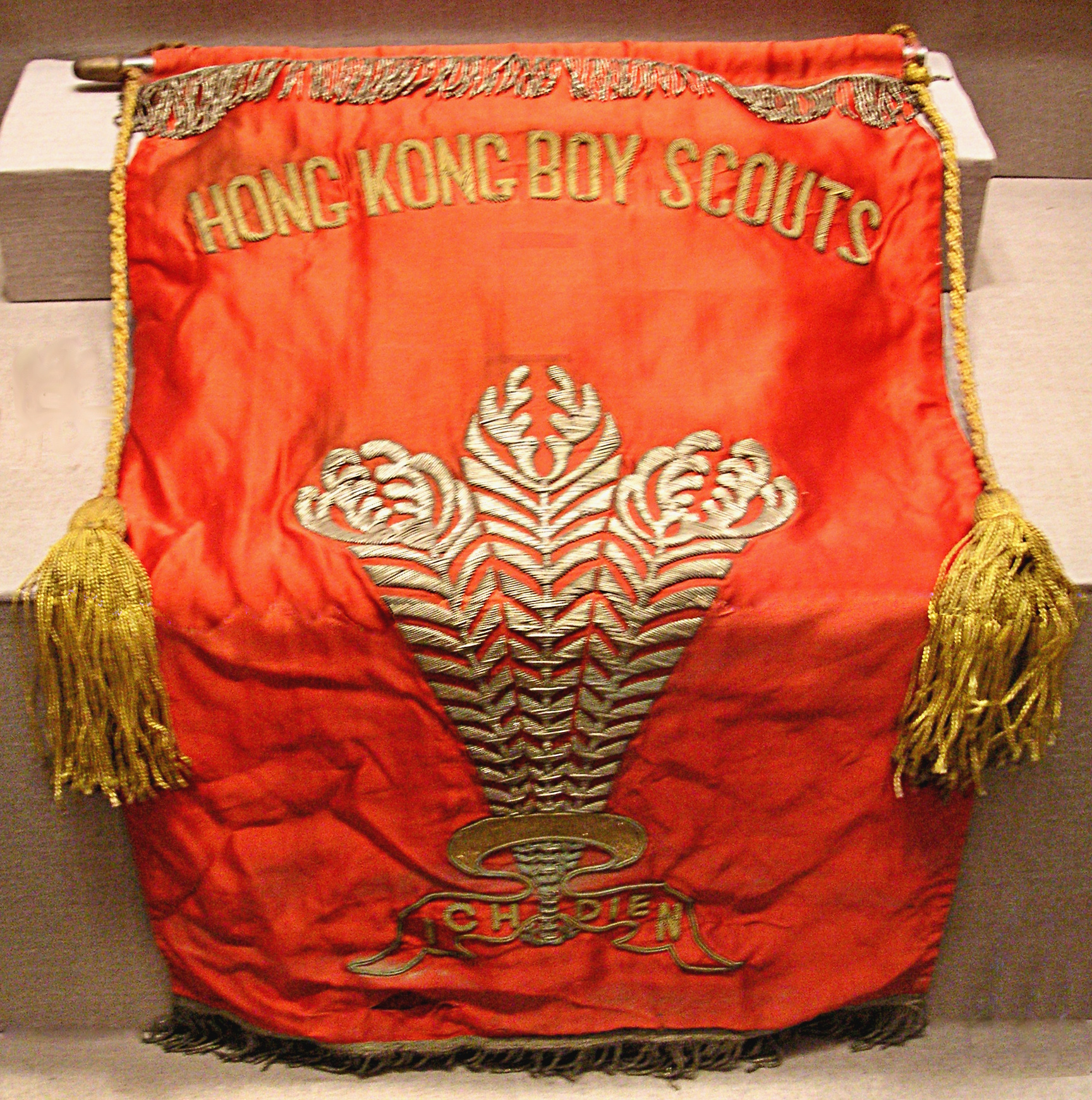
The 3rd issue of Prince of Wales Banner in 1960s

The reorganised branch held a Scout Rally at the Murray Parade Ground on 8 January 1921 at Garden Road, now called Cheung Kong Center. In September 1921, the Reverend George Turner Waldegrave succeeded Bowen, and the Scout Movement was firmly established in Hong Kong, though it was still small at 384 members. In the same year, Hong Kong Scouting expanded to the Wolf Cub Section. Sea Scout training had been started in May 1921 with the assistance of the staff of HMS Tamar. Following its success, Waldegrave started the first Sea Scout Troop which he registered in October 1923. The first Prince of Wales Banner Competition (威爾斯太子錦標賽), named for Edward VIII of the United Kingdom, was held in Happy Valley on 26 May 1923. The banner stayed with the victorious troop for a year and the troop was honoured with the honorary title of Governor's Troop (督憲團).

Early Scouters were military officers, priests, teachers and older Scouts. Not every Scouter would apply for a warrant, which would be required for the formal registration with the headquarters in London. It took several months to complete the whole application process through mail. Many Scouters stayed only for a short period and opted for serving without a warrant.

In order to protect Scouting activity and institute its constitution, the Hong Kong branch was incorporated in the Boys Scouts Association Ordinance, nr 22 of the Law of Hong Kong on 2 December 1927. After amendments in 1939, 1950, 1975 and 1997, the ordinance became chapter 1005 of the Law of Hong Kong. Waldegrave returned to England in August 1934 and, in recognition of his work for the Hong Kong branch, he was awarded the civil membership of the Order of the British Empire by His Majesty the King. A year or two prior to his retirement, the Chief Scout Baden-Powell had awarded him the highest Scout award, the Bronze Wolf. The Scout Association, Hong Kong Branch, grew to 682 members that year.

The Reverend Victor Halward became Colony Commissioner on 11 May 1935 after the retirement of Waldegrave. Shortly before he took over the Commissionership, at the request of the Chinese Government in Guangdong, Halward had spent weekends directing a training course for Scouters of the Boy Scouts of China in Guangzhou. The results of his efforts were a great improvement in the relations between the Boy Scouts Association and the Boy Scouts of China, and between the Hong Kong branch and the Guangzhou section of the Boy Scouts of China. For this he also was awarded the Bronze Wolf. Numbers were still increasing yearly and in 1938 Halward appointed District Commissioners from either side of the harbour, viz., Quah Chow Cheung and Chan, who amply justified their appointment and a large step in membership showed to approximately 1200 members in 1942.

=== World War II ===
After 1937, China was at war with the Japanese army. Troops of the Boy Scouts of China came to Hong Kong and were incorporated into the Hong Kong Branch. Hong Kong Scouts were instrumental in aiding war refugees. During World War II, Scoutmasters and adult members performed civic duties in the Special Constabulary, Police and Volunteer Defence Corps.

On 8 December 1941, Japanese forces crossed the Sham Chun River and the Battle of Hong Kong began. The forces landed on Hong Kong Island on 18 December 1941, and incurred a heavy toll of death during the resistance at Wong Nai Chung Gap. Many Hong Kong Scouts died in the resistance activities. Although heavily resisted, the whole territory of Hong Kong came in Japanese hands on 25 December 1941. Under Japanese rule, all formal Scouting activities halted and many Scouts joined guerrilla units against the Japanese in the New Territories and adjacent prefectures in China. The Scouting headquarters on Garden Road was demolished during the war. The campus of St. Stephen's College (an all-boy boarding school) in Stanley, which was being used as a military hospital for British forces at the outbreak of the war, was quickly turned into a POW camp by the occupying Imperial Japanese army. Westerners were detained there for the duration of the war. (Hong Kong was occupied for over 3 years and 8 months.) In the concentration camp, Scouting activities were conducted in the shadow. Scout Ronald Whitfield even completed proficiency badges in this period and became a King's Scout when he was back in Scotland.

After the war, Hong Kong was repossessed by British forces. For the reconstruction of Scouting, the Imperial Headquarters of The Boy Scouts Association in the United Kingdom dispatched a five-member Scout International Relief Service Team to revive the Hong Kong Scout movement. A post-war St. George's Day Parade was held on 28 April 1946 at the Botanical Garden with the participation of 672 Scouts and leaders. The salute was taken by the General Officer Commanding, Major General Francis Wogan Festing. In the early 1950s, Hong Kong Scouting was first divided into districts.

=== Changes to name and system ===
Scout Association of Hong Kong 1950s-1980s

In 1967, in line with the name change of the Boy Scouts Association, the name was changed to the Scout Association, Hong Kong Branch. In 1969, also sections were renamed, e.g., Wolf Cub to Cub Scouts, Boy Scouts to Scouts (age changed to 11–16) and Senior Scouts to Venture Scouts (age changed to 16–20).

A mixed unit of boy and girl Venture Scouts was set up in 1975. Girl members were accepted starting July 1978, making the Hong Kong branch a co-educational organisation, much earlier than the Scout Association of the United Kingdom.

Commonwealth Commissioner Sir Marc Noble suggested that the Hong Kong branch become a full member of the WOSM, and they were accepted as its 111th full member on 26 April 1977 with its name formally changed to The Scout Association of Hong Kong.

=== International activities up to 2000 ===
The 60th anniversary of Hong Kong Scouting was held between 23 and 29 July 1971 at the Castle Peak and was attended by more than 5,000 Scouts. The British contingent to the 14th World Scout Jamboree, led by Robert Baden-Powell, 3rd Baron Baden-Powell, included Scouts from branches in Bermuda, Hong Kong and Rhodesia.

Hong Kong hosted the 11th annual Asia-Pacific Regional Scout Conference in 1978. It was attended by 19 countries and 300 delegates. In 1980, the Administration Conference for Commissioners was held. The Scout Association of Hong Kong has organised activities to echo the International Youth Year in 1985.

In the early 1990s, the Chief Commissioner Chau Cham-son brought the association into a new era by having planned and completed in 1994 the 25-story Hong Kong Scout Centre, providing the association with a meaningful foundation for its development to be financially self-sufficient. The 19th Asia-Pacific Regional Scout Conference was held in 1998 at the Hong Kong Scout Centre, and was the first Scout Conference held fully on Scout premises.

Honorary President of the World Scout Foundation and King of Sweden Carl XVI Gustaf made a visit to Hong Kong for the 45th Baden-Powell World Fellowship Event at the Hong Kong Scout Centre, which raised US$385,000 for the World Scout Foundation.

=== Sovereignty transfer ===
The sovereignty of Hong Kong was transferred to The People's Republic of China (PRC) on 1 July 1997, but Hong Kong Scouting remained unchanged. Thirteen years previous to Hong Kong's sovereignty transfer, the UK and the PRC had reached an agreement on the future of Hong Kong and embodied the agreement by signing the Sino-British Joint Declaration. Under the framework of the declaration, Scouting is part of the way of life in Hong Kong, and can be preserved for fifty years. With Scouting being protected under this declaration, Hong Kong remains a full member of WOSM today.

Although no major change occurred in Hong Kong Scouting, adjustments were made before and after the sovereignty transfer including the withdrawal of the Gurkha district as the British forces together with Gurkha Brigades left Hong Kong, and the cessation of Scouting support by British Forces. Under PRC rule, the People's Liberation Army entered in no such connection with the association. One increasing trend is to practise the PRC anthem and teach the knowledge of the PRC flag, with the British anthem and flag emphasised only in historical context. In line with the sovereignty change, the Promises of Scouts, Cub Scouts, and Grasshopper Scouts were modified on 12 January 2001, and the phrases the territory or Hong Kong were replaced with my country. The Scout Policy, Organisation and Rules (POR) were also changed accordingly.

Since the sovereignty change, the association encourages Scouts to participate in cultural exchange programmes in mainland China. A Scout Jamboree for both Hong Kong Scouts and Young Pioneers of China was held in Shenzhen in 2004. Educational organisations in mainland China participated the Metropolitan Jamboree in December 2006 in Hong Kong. The Scout Association of Hong Kong has a Mainland Affairs Branch, which is responsible for communication with Mainland youth organizations and connecting local members with mainland youths. The Branch organises and coordinates visits between Hong Kong SAR's youth and youth organizations in mainland.

=== New millennium ===
Herman Hui, the Deputy Chief Commissioner (Support) of Hong Kong was elected to the World Scout Committee at the 36th World Scout Conference in 2002, and was the second Hong Kong Scout leader to be elected. In the 37th World Scout Conference held in Tunisia in 2005, Hui was elected as the chairman of the World Scout Committee for a term of three years.

In order to further develop the Scout Movement in Hong Kong and to heighten it output quality, they published the document Scout Association of Hong Kong, Into the 21st century in 1999. The target set in 1991 to increase Scout membership to 83,000 members in ten years was achieved: membership was 89,925 at the end of 2002. The next target of membership growth was 100,000 members in 2004.

Pau Shiu-hung was appointed Chief Commissioner by Tung Chee-hwa, Chief Scout of Hong Kong and chief executive of Hong Kong Special Administrative Region. He commenced his official duties as Chief Commissioner on 2004-01-01.

=== Air Scouting ===
The history of Air Scouting in Hong Kong began in 1967 when a Jesuit priest, Father Cunningham, formed an Air Scout Troop in the 11th Kowloon Scout Group of Kowloon Wah Yan College during the five-year expansion plan of the Scout Association of Hong Kong. Initially, participation in the Air Scouts was limited to students of the Wan Yan College. Then this closed group added a Venture Air Scout unit as the original 1967 Air Scouts reached the age of sixteen, the minimum age required to become Venture Air Scouts. In 1972, the Chief Scout of Hong Kong appointed Mr. Francis Yiu Cheong CHIN, Q.S., J.P. as the first Air Scout Commissioner to develop and expand Air Scouting. Mr. Chin is a Queen's Scout, a Scout Leader Trainer, and a member of the Hong Kong Chin Brothers aviators who established the long-distance flying record of successfully completed "The First 100 horsepower Single-engine England to Hong Kong Long Distance Cross-Country Flight in History". As a result, Air Scouting spread and flourished and expanded to 18 Air Scout units in 5 Regions of Scout Groups in Hong Kong. Mr. Chin is the first Air Scout Commissioner of Hong Kong who built up the foundation of Air Scouting in Hong Kong and his air scouting training system continued up to today.

Presently an Air Activity Board which draws members from airline pilots, the Government Flying Service, and local aviation clubs. The Board acts as the core policy and program-making group, and helps to grow the Air Scout Movement. The Learning Training Institute of the Scout Association also runs an Aviation Training Centre which houses a number of flight simulators, including full motion simulators, and conducts training for Scout members for the purpose of aviation education and preparation for private pilot training.

=== Banquets ===
In April 2021, SCMP reported that the Scout Association was under investigation by the Office of the Licensing Authority, as well as the Food and the Environmental Hygiene Department for allegedly hosting banquets above the limit of 20 people. In October 2021, the government revealed it would prosecute the case, and that one banquet had more than five times the legal limit of people.

== Organisation ==
The organisation is governed according to Chapter 1005 of the Law of Hong Kong, and the statutory Policy, Organisation and Rules (POR, 政策、組織及規條) of the association.

All members join the association voluntarily and it is open to all who are willing to follow the association's guiding principles, the Scout Promise and the Scout Law. All races, creeds, classes and sexes are welcome. The only limit is the minimum age of five years. The association encourages members to be in touch with a religion in its religion policy, but like the population of Hong Kong, the vast majority of Scouts belong to no religious denomination.

The POR mentions that members are required to pay a membership subscription fee, which is in line with WOSM regulation. However, most members are not aware of this subscription because it is not collected directly from individuals or any Scout units, but through the selling of each individual World Membership Badge.

=== Chief Scouts and Chief Commissioners ===
The Chief Scout of Hong Kong (香港童軍總領袖) is the head of the Scout Association of Hong Kong. From 1914 to 1997 the function was held by the Governor of Hong Kong, and from 1997 onward by the Chief Executive of Hong Kong. The Chief Scout is responsible for appointing the Hong Kong Chief Commissioner.

- Francis May (1912–1919)
- Reginald Stubbs (1919–1925)
- Cecil Clementi (1925–1930)
- William Peel (1930–1935)
- Andrew Caldecott (1935–1937)
- Geoffry Northcote (1937–1941)
- Mark Young (1941–1947)
- Alexander Grantham (1947–1958)
- Robert Brown Black (1958–1964)
- David Trench (1964–1971)
- Murray MacLehose (1971–1982)
- Edward Youde (1982–1986)
- David Wilson (1987–1992)
- Christopher Patten (1992–1997)
- Tung Chee-hwa (1997–2005)
- Donald Tsang Yam-kuen (2005–2012)
- Leung Chun-ying (2012–2017)
- Carrie Lam (2017–2022)
- John Lee Ka-chiu (2022–present)

The Chief Commissioner (香港總監), usually abbreviated as CC, is the administrative head of the Scout Association of Hong Kong. The function was formerly known as Colony Commissioner. The first commissioner, Alexander Anderson McHardy, was appointed 1 May 1914 when the Hong Kong Branch was formally registered with the Scout Association.

The Chief Commissioner (from 1997) as follows:

- Hui Chiu-yin (1997–2004)
- Pau Shiu-hung, SBS (2004–2007)
- Chan Kit-chu (2007–2011)
- Cheung Chi-sun (2011–2015)
- Ng Ah-ming (2015–2019)
- Joseph Lau (2019–2023)
- Wilson Lai Wai-sang, IMSM (2023–Present)

The president of the Association is The Honourable Mr Justice Jeremy Poon Siu-chor.

=== Regions, districts, and groups ===
In 1951, the Hong Kong branch of the Scout Association was divided into Hong Kong, Kowloon and New Territories districts. Later the former two were each subdivided into two separate districts, resulting in a total of five districts. In 1958, these were reclassified as areas, which were each subdivided into smaller districts, and in 1967 again renamed to be regions, with thirty-five districts among them.

Region	Districts
Hong Kong Island	Chai Wan, Northern, Sau Kei Wan, Southern, Victoria City, Wan Chai, Western
Kowloon	Ho Man Tin, Hung Hom, Kowloon City, Kowloon Tong, Mong Kok, Sham Mong, Sham Shui Po East, Sham Shui Po West, Yau Tsim
East Kowloon	Kowloon Bay, Kwun Tong, Lei Yue Mun, Sai Kung, Sau Mau Ping, Tseung Kwan O, Tsz Wan Shan, Wong Tai Sin
New Territories	Island, North Kwai Chung, Shep Pak Heung, South Kwai Chung, Tsing Yi, Tsuen Wan, Tuen Mun East, Tuen Mun West, Yuen Long East, Yuen Long West
New Territories East	Pik Fung, Shatin East, Shatin North, Shatin South, Shatin West, Sheung Yue, Tai Po South, Tai Po North
Special for English speaking people	Silver Jubilee (銀禧區)
Special for family members of Nepalese Gurkha regiment in the British Army	Gurkha (啹喀區) (until 1997)

Groups are basic units where member Scouts are educated. The POR recognises only two group categories, namely a Scout Group (公開旅) with unrestricted recruitment, and a Sponsored Scout Group (團體旅), organised by a sponsor organisation, by which the recruitment might be restricted. In practice, the vast majority of Groups are Sponsored Scout Groups organised by primary schools and secondary schools. Alternatively, these are referred to as School Scout Groups (學校旅), the unrestricted groups as Open Scout Groups (公開旅), and other non-school-organised groups with restricted recruitment Organisation Scout Groups (團體旅). A group is led by a Group Scout Leader (旅長). The management of a group is organised around the Group Scouters Meeting (旅領袖會議), the Group Council (旅務委員會), and the group executive committee (旅執行委員會). A group can operate any number of units in all sections. The association does not directly finance any group. Groups may gather funds from their sponsored organisation, individual donations, the group membership fee, and the release of raffle proceeds in the same annual Raffle Campaign.

=== Scouting sections ===
Awards

L: Queen Scout Award (before 1997)
R: HKSAR Scout Award (1997–2008)
Dragon Scout Award (after 2008)

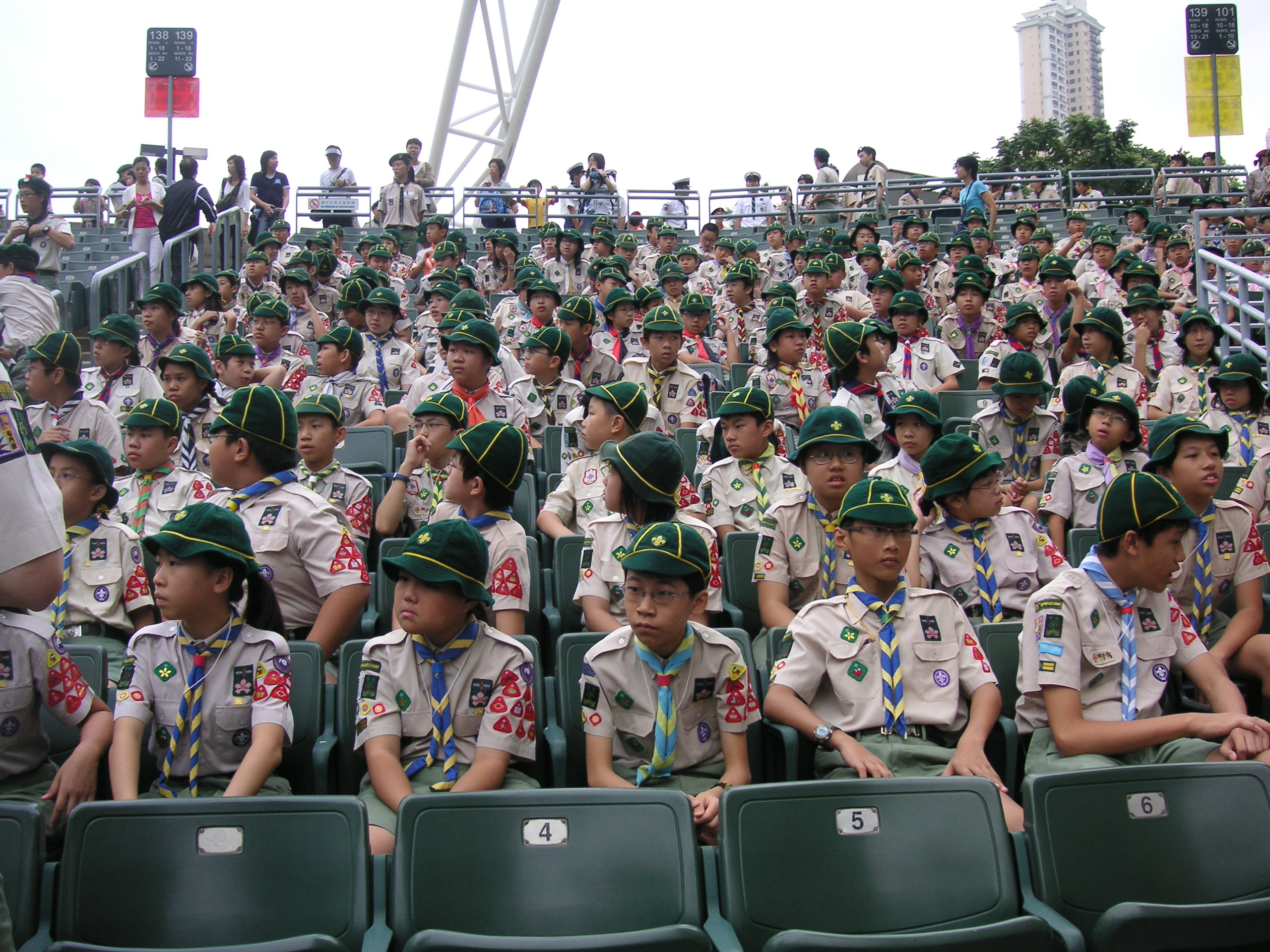
Cub Scouts of Hong Kong at 2005 Scout Rally

The youth members of the Scout Association in Hong Kong are currently divided into five Scouting sections:

- Grasshopper Scouts, from 6 to 8 years
- Cub Scouts, from 7 to 12 years
- Scouts, from 11 to 16 years
- Venture Scouts, from 15 to 21 years
- Rover Scouts, from 18 to 26 years

There are still groups specialising in Air Scouting and Sea Scouting, but no new groups have been allowed for such specialisation after 1 April 1987. Instead, any group can operate a Sea Scout Troop or Air Scout Troop in their Scout Section, and Venture Sea Scout Unit or Venture Air Scout Unit in their Venture Scout Section, providing the same level of progressive training in sea and air activities.

A special Extension Scouting section was set up for the disabled. It is not an independent section, but customises the programmes of the five sections for specific needs of disabled people.

== Ranks ==
=== Scouts ===
A Cub Scout or Scout has ranks in their own patrol.

For Scouts they are divided into Patrol Leader (PL), the highest rank in a patrol, Assistant Patrol Leader (APL), the second rank & P#, with the # referring to their placement in the Patrol. For example, P4 is the fourth place in a patrol, P12 is the twelfth rank in the patrol.

Only the PL and the APL have a special badge to wear on their uniform.

There is also a rank named Senior Patrol Leader (SPL). This Scout is usually older than others and is not in any patrol. He or she is responsible for the entire Cub Scout or Scout group.

For Cubs, the structure is similar but the names are different. The highest rank is the Sixer, with the second rank being the Seconder.

Rank badges for both Cubs and Scouts are about two inches wide and half an inch long. There is a gold fleur de lis in the middle with one, two or three lines next to it. The APL or Seconder badge has one line, PL or Sixer has two, and the SPL has three. That is also why the ranks are also called 單柴 (one-bar) for APL/Seconder, 兩柴 (two-bar) for PL/Sixer and 三柴 (three-bar) for SPL according to the golden bars next to the fleur de lis on the rank badge. The badge background is dark green. The badge is worn under the membership badge.

The rankings, from high to low of Scouts (excluding Scouters) are: SPL, PL/Sixer, APL/Seconder and the others.

=== Leaders ===
An adult is eligible to be a Scout Leader (Scouter) from 18 to 65 years. They can serve in all five sections, or work for districts, regions, or branches in the headquarters. Adult Venture and Rover Scouts may be leaders of younger sections as part of their services.

Section	Name of unit	Head	Assistants
Grasshopper Scout	Grasshopper Scout Ring (小童軍團)	Grasshopper Scout Leader (小童軍團長)	Assistant Grasshopper Scout Leaders (小童軍副團長) and Instructors (敎練員)
Cub Scout	Cub Scout Pack (幼童軍團)	Cub Scout Leader (幼童軍團長)	Assistant Cub Scout Leaders (幼童軍副團長) and Instructors
Scout	Scout Troop (童軍團)	Scout Leader (童軍團長)	Assistant Scout Leaders (童軍副團長) and Instructors
Venture Scout	Venture Unit (深資童軍團)	Venture Scout Leader (深資童軍團長)	Assistant Venture Scout Leaders (深資童軍副團長) and Instructors
Rover Scout	Rover Crew (樂行童軍團)	Rover Scout Leader (樂行童軍團長)	Assistant Rover Scout Leaders (樂行童軍副團長) and Instructors

All leaders except instructors are appointed by the association under the nomination of Group Scout Leaders, and receive a warrant after completing at least the intermediate stage of the Woodbadge Training Programme. Group leader and assistant group leaders are nominated by District Commissioners.

== Motto, Promise, and Law ==
The localised versions of the Scout Motto, Scout Promise, and Scout Law for each section are inherited from those of the Scout Association. They are officially provided in Chinese and English. At investiture it can be in a Scout's own language. The Motto is the same for all sections: Be Prepared (準備).

Section	Promise	Law
Grasshopper	I promise to be a Grasshopper Scout, to love God, to love people, and to love my Country. (我願參加小童軍，愛神愛人愛國家)	A Grasshopper Scout does a good turn every day. (小童軍日行一善)
Cub Scout	I promise that I will do my best to do my duty to God and to my Country, to help other people, and to keep the Cub Scout Law. (我願盡所能； 對神明，對國家，盡責任； 對別人，要幫助； 對規律，必遵行)	Cub Scouts always do their best, think of others before themselves and do a good turn every day. (幼童軍，盡所能，先顧別人 才顧己，日行一善富精神)
Scout, Venture Scout, Rover Scout and Leader	On my honour, I promise that I will do my best to do my duty to God and to my Country, to help other people, and to keep the Scout Law. (我願以信譽為誓，竭盡所能； 對神明，對國家，盡責任； 對別人，要幫助；對規律，必遵行)	1. A Scout is to be trusted. (童軍信用為人敬); 2. A Scout is loyal. (童軍待人要忠誠); 3. A Scout is friendly and considerate. (童軍友善兼親切); 4. A Scout belongs to the worldwide family of Scouts. (童軍相處如手足); 5. A Scout has courage in all difficulties. (童軍勇敢不怕難); 6. A Scout makes good use of time and is careful of possessions and property. (童軍愛物更惜陰); 7. A Scout has self-respect and respect for others. (童軍自重又重人)

== Emblem ==
The Emblem of the association is an Arrowhead (essentially a Fleur-de-lis and most commonly used in purple color), on which is superimposed the two Chinese characters for "Hong Kong" and the English words "Hong Kong".

== Headquarters ==
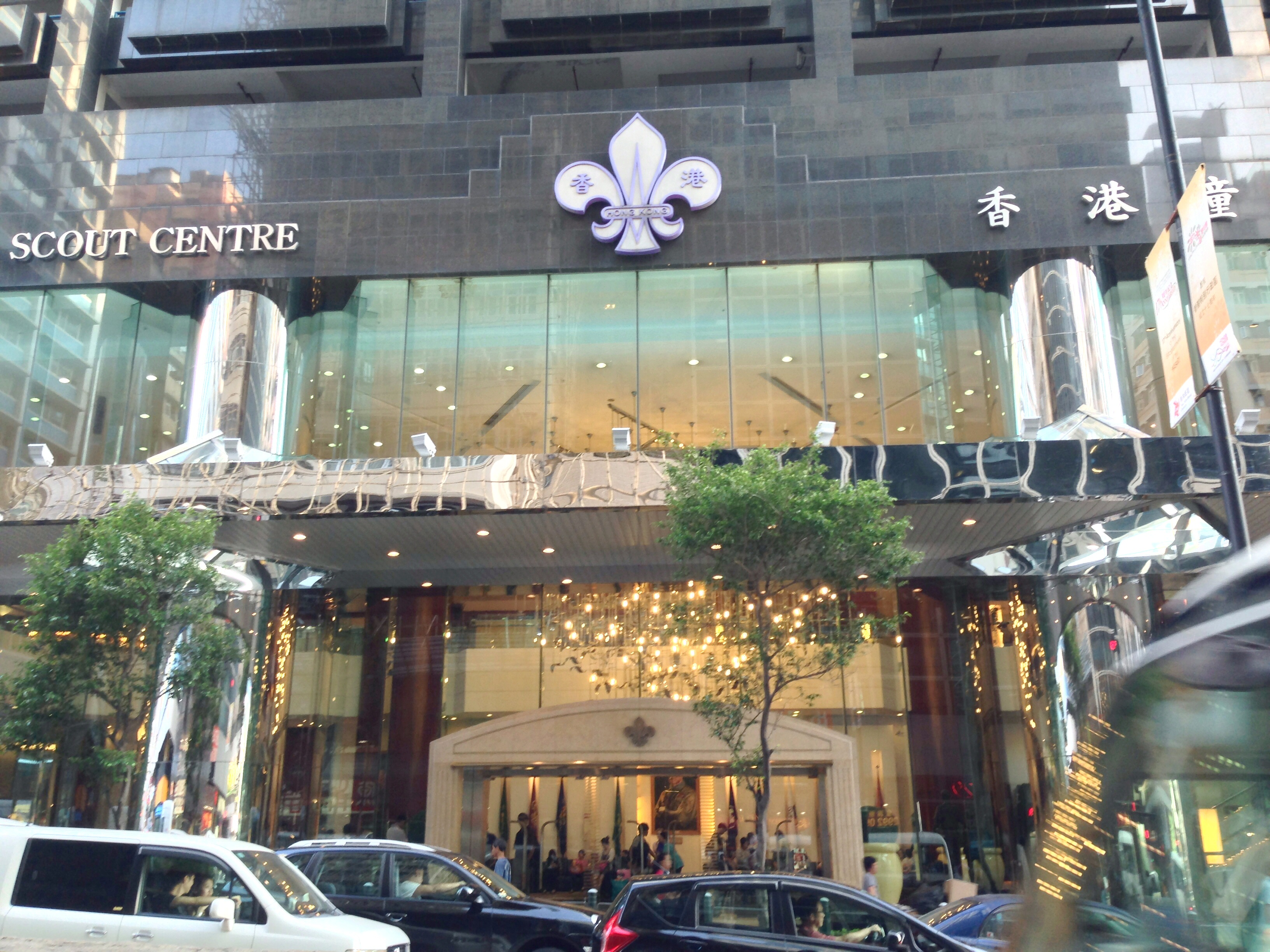
Hong Kong Scout Centre on Austin Road

There were no permanent headquarters in the early days of Hong Kong Scouting. The office was housed temporarily in old government buildings. The Chief Commissioner George Turner Waldegrave, offered the Seamen's Institute as a place for Scouting activities. After the second World War, the British forces donated a piece of land near the Peak Tram Terminal in Garden Road. Here a new headquarters was erected and named Morse Hut (摩士小屋) after the President Sir Arthur Morse. Morse Hut was officially opened on 12 November 1949, and served as the headquarters until 1954. In this period, the headquarters of Wong Nai Chung District was also relocated to Morse Hut. Subsequently, Morse Hut was the headquarters of newly established Hong Kong Island Region from 1958 to 1978.

As the Hong Kong Scouting grew rapidly, after five years the Morse Hut was too small for the development. A new 3-story headquarter building in Yau Ma Tei, Kowloon was erected at No. 9 Cox's Road with donations and assistance from Sir Arthur Morse and the Royal Hong Kong Jockey Club, as well as subsidies from Hong Kong Government. It was opened officially in 1954. The house was named Morse House (摩士大廈), and served as the headquarters until June 1994, when the premises were returned to the Hong Kong Government for redevelopment. Morse House was handed back to the Government in July 1994, after completion of the new headquarters.

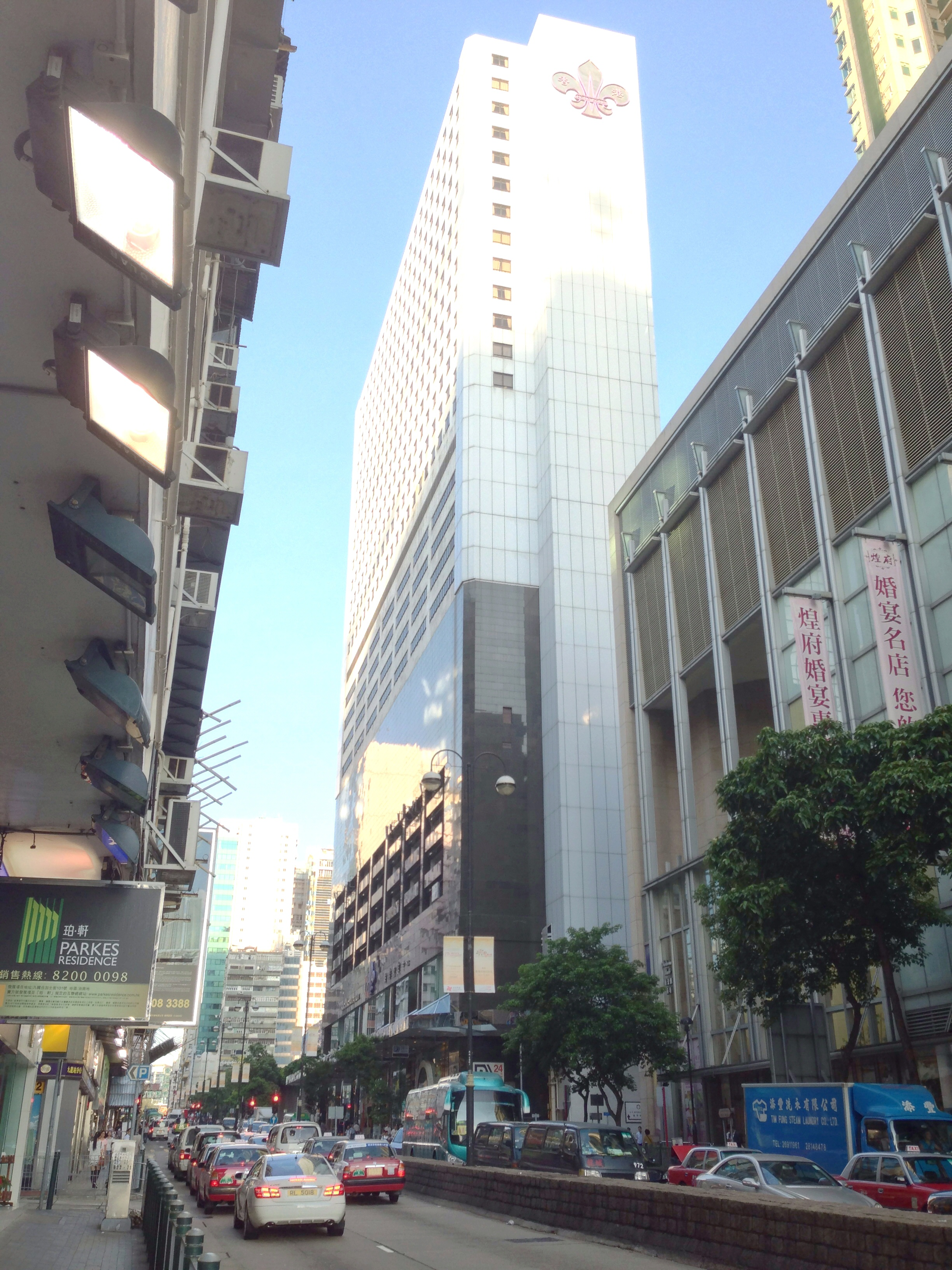
Hong Kong Scout Centre side view

Since June 1994, the headquarters of the Scout association is in the Hong Kong Scout Centre (香港童 軍中心). It is on Austin Road, beside Kowloon Park and Victoria Towers (港景峰) of Tsim Sha Tsui, Kowloon. The headquarters organisation is housed on the 8th to 11th floor of the building, including Scout shops, meeting rooms, and a Scout exhibition of the history of the Hong Kong Scout organisation on the 11th. Large part of the centre is B P International (龍堡國際賓館), a commercial hotel with 529 rooms. Its profit is financing the building cost of the centre and the future development of Scouting in Hong Kong. Scout Path (童軍徑) is a short road between the Hong Kong Scout Centre and Victoria Towers. It became associated with Scouting in Hong Kong, probably on the suggestion of the Scout association. It connects Austin Road and a terminal for Hong Kong-China cross-border buses under the Hong Kong Scout Centre.

== Campsites ==
The Scout association runs five campsites in Hong Kong. The first permanent campsite, was Barker's Bungalow in Chaiwan. It was purchased in July 1929 by the Scout association at a cost of HK$16,000, and officially opened the same year as the Chai Wan Campsite. Here, the first Wood Badge training course was held in 1936. The site was returned to Hong Kong government in 1970 for urban development as the Chai Wan Park.

The 1960s saw the further expansion of the Scout Movement; the government gave a site at Fei Ngo Shan (Kowloon Peak) to the Scout association as a permanent campsite, which was named Gilwell Campsite (基維爾營地). It is used for camping and other Scouting activities. The site is located on the edge of Sai Kung District, five to ten minutes from Choi Hung. Nearby is the MacLehose Trail with road access through an unnamed road that joins with Fei Ngo Shan Road. The site is at an altitude of 430 m above sea level. Unlike other campsites managed by the Scout association, the Gilwell Campsite does not provide catering services. The site has only buildings for offices, lectures and activities. The campsite is 45 minutes walk from the nearest bus stop of route 91, 91M, 92, 96R of Kowloon Motor Bus at Clear Water Bay Road near Anderson Road.

In the 1972, Tai Tam Scout Centre (大潭童軍中心) was granted to the Scout association in exchange for the Chai Wan Campsite. The site hosts a sea activities centre, officially opened in September of that year. It is located in Tai Tam Harbour at Tai Tam Tuk on the south shore of the Hong Kong Island. At the back of the site is a small hill, separating it from Tai Tam Tuk Reservoir. Along the shore is a path leading to the dam of the reservoir, with a re-sited indigenous village of Tai Tam Tuk. Mangroves gather at the muddy beach of the mouth rivers. The sites facilitates both a stay at the hostel and campingsite for training and leisure. While Scouts have priority to use the site, it is also open for public use. Sports on offer include games of rope, rock climbing, archery, pioneering, canoeing, and orienteering. The campsite is reachable by public buses passing through Tai Tam Road near Tai Tam Reservoir Road. They are available in Shau Kei Wan station and Chai Wan station of the MTR.

More land in Tung Tsz, Tai Po in the New Territories, was also granted to the Scout association, and was developed into the Tung Tsz Scout Centre (洞梓童軍中心), formally opened for Scouts on 1975-03-09. Sea activities can be done in the nearby Tai Mei Tuk Sea Activity Centre in Tai Mei Tuk, Tai Po, with bungalows for accommodation.

Tai Mei Tuk Sea Activity Centre (大尾督水上活動中心) is situated next to the Plover Cove Reservoir in Tai Mei Tuk for day camping and water sports training. Shatin Scout Centre (沙田童軍中心) is in Tsok Pok Hang, near Pok Hong Estate in Sha Tin, providing Scouts a place for wild camping. Pak Sha Wan Tam Wah Ching Sea Activity Centre (白沙灣譚華正水上活動中心) is in Pak Sha Wan of Sai Kung District. It is a venue for residential camp, outdoor camping and sea activities training.

== Scout events ==
=== Hong Kong Scout Rally ===
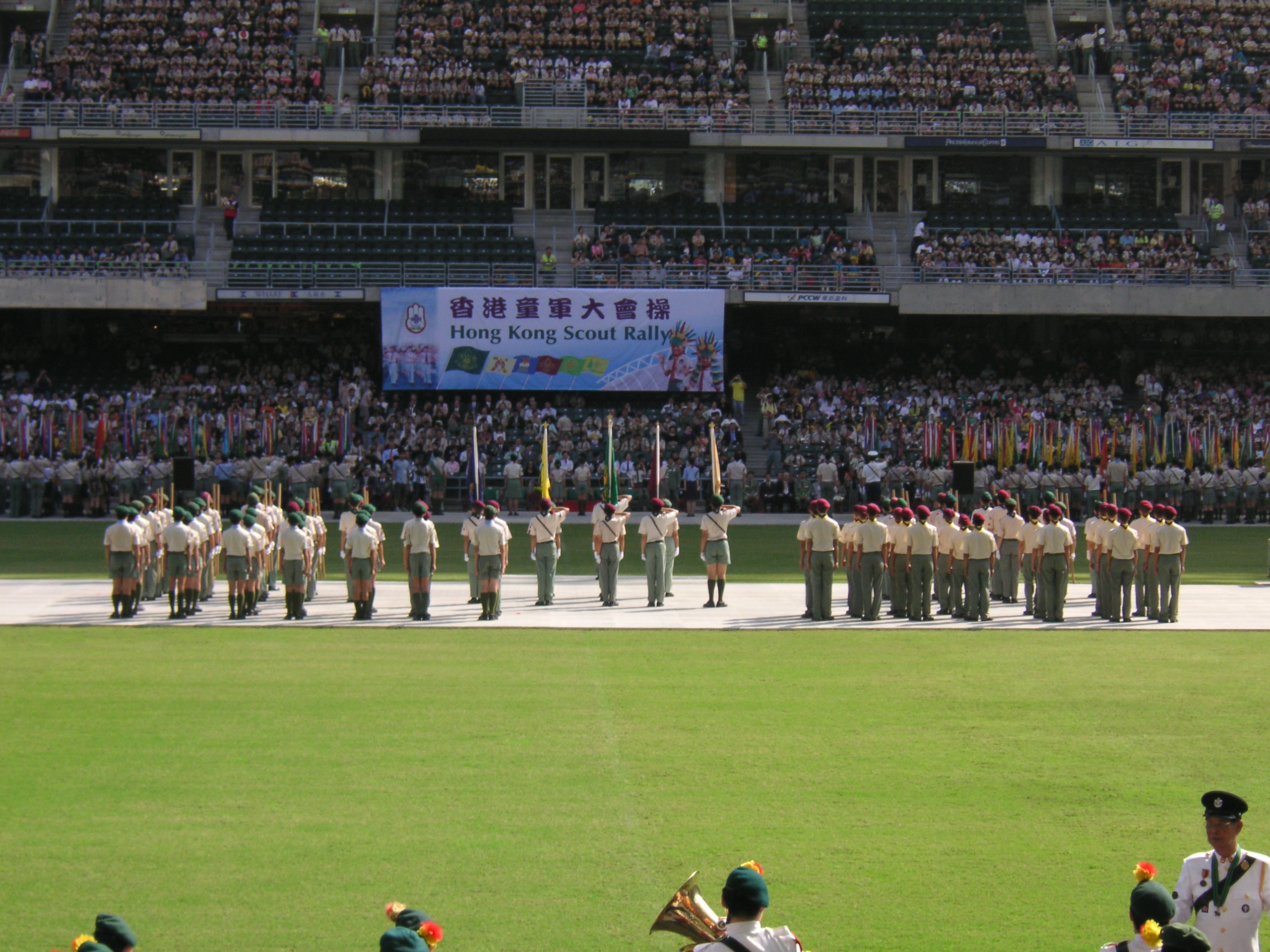
Scout Rally in Hong Kong Stadium, 2005

The Scout Rally is a gathering of Hong Kong Scouts in which they are given awards and compete in drills. Occurring once every year, Scouts from all over Hong Kong gather, usually in the Hong Kong Stadium, for the event. There are award ceremonies for honourable awards, such as the Golden Bauhenia Award for the Cub Scout Section, the Chief Scout's Award for the Scout Section, the Hong Kong Special Administrative Region (HKSAR) Scout Award for the Venture Scout Section, and the Baden Powell (BP) Award for the Rover Scout Section, as well as distinctive awards for Scout Leaders and Commissioners.

In the 1940s, the Scout Rally was merged with the former St. George's Day Parade. As the Scouts attendance increased significantly and the space in Hong Kong declined, owing to rapid urbanisation in past decades, traditions are simplified and only selected Scouts are allowed to actively participate in the drill and activities in the rally and others remain spectators.

=== Jamborees ===
Jamborees in Hong Kong are held for specific anniversaries. According to a display in Metropolitan Jamboree in 2006, the early jamborees were held in Chai Wan, Hong Kong around the late 1930s.

After World War II, the 1st Colony Jamborette (香港童子軍大露營) was held in Kam Chien Village in the New Territories from 19 to 22 October 1957. There were 1361 Scouts attending the jamboree, celebrating the 50 year anniversary of World Scouting and 100 year birthday of the founder. The next jamboree, the Hong Kong Golden Jubilee Jamborette (香港金禧大露營), was held between 27 December 1961 and 2 January 1962, celebrating the Golden jubilee (50 year anniversary) of Hong Kong Scouting with the theme One World (天下一家). At Kowloon Tsai, now named Morse Park, the Jamboree hosted 2732 Scouts in the challenging winter with heavy rain.

For the 60th anniversary of Hong Kong Scouting, the branch held the Diamond Jubilee Jamboree (鑽禧大露營) for 5000 Scouts, applying the theme World Harmony (大同) from 23 to 29 July 1971 in present-day Tai Hing Estate in Castle Peak. The event was originally planned to be held 22 to 28 July 1971 but shifted to one day later because of the typhoon attack to Hong Kong. The jamboree was seriously affected by the bad weather. The campsite was flooded and facilities were damaged. Campers had to retreat to San Fat Estate in Tuen Mun for shelter overnight. The Hong Kong Post Office issued a set of three stamps for the jamboree on 23 July.

In 1986, in celebrating the 75th anniversary of Hong Kong Scouting, the Hong Kong Diamond Jubilee Jamboree (香港鑽禧大露營) was held in Kohima Camp, present-day Hong Kong University of Science and Technology, in Tai Po Tsai from 27 December 1986 to 1 January 1987 with the theme March On (邁進). It was the first jamboree held after the Scout Association of Hong Kong became a full member of WOSM. The association invited Scouts from thirteen other Scout organisations around the world, and eight other local uniformed youth groups to the jamboree. Members of the Guangzhou Youth Federation (廣州市青年聯合會) from Guangzhou, People's Republic of China also joined the jamboree. The number of attendants reached 5143. On 30 December 1986, the Enjoy Yourself Tonight TVB television programme launched a programme to introduce the jamboree and Scouting to the residents in Hong Kong. The jamboree also was featured because of breaking two Guinness World Records: 3000 Cub Scouts joined the Egg Hunt and found 72,731 hidden eggs throughout the campsite and ended in an arrangement of the 75th logo. The failed knotting competition was retried later in the Hong Kong Scout Millennium Jamboree.

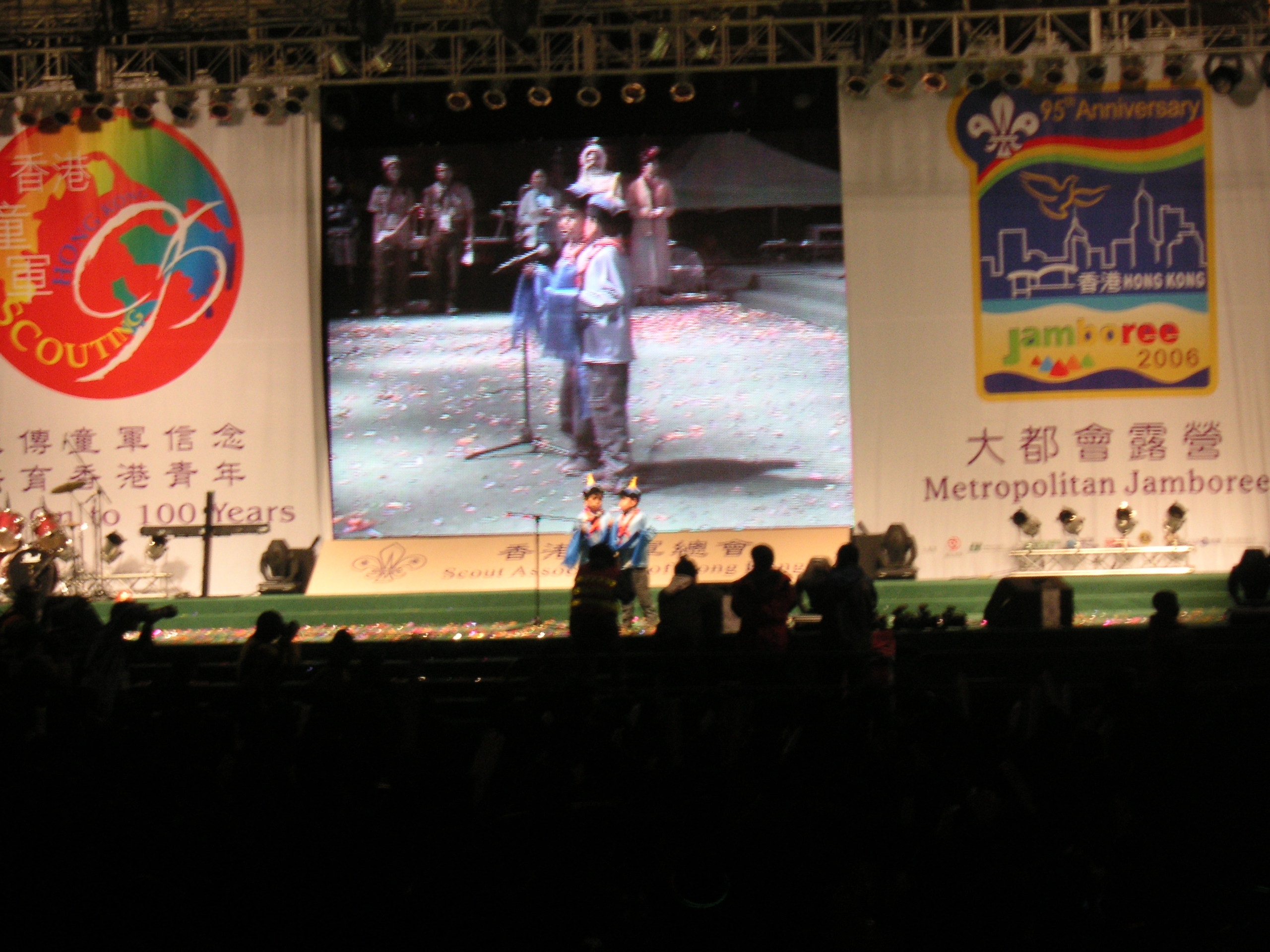
Mongolian Scouts singing in the Metropolitan Jamboree, 2006

The Hong Kong Scout Millennium Jamboree (跨世紀大露營) was held in Wan Tsai from 28 December 1999 to 2 January 2000 with the theme Live the Natural Way (邁向新紀元，同享大自然), fourteen years after the previous jamboree. There were 3350 participants in the jamboree. The Chief Scout Tung Chee-hwa, the Chief Executive of Hong Kong, joined the open ceremony on 30 December. To complete the failed knotting competition of the previous jamboree, the Chief Scout began the first reef knots and the rest of the campers tied 4500 reef knots in 5 minutes, chaining in 6858 metres long.

Two years later, in 2001, the association held the 90th Anniversary of Hong Kong Scouting Jamboree (香港童軍90週年紀念大露營) again in Wan Tsai from 23 to 26 December 2001. Do My Best (竭盡所能) was the theme. Local Scouts, with nine other overseas Scout contingents, tolled 3500 participants in the jamboree.

In celebrating the 95th anniversary of Hong Kong Scouting in 2006 and the 100th anniversary of World Scouting, the Metropolitan Jamboree (大都會露營) was held in the proposed West Kowloon Cultural District site near Tsim Sha Tsui in urban Hong Kong from 27 December 2006 to 1 January 2007. Near the Victoria Harbour, it was the first time a jamboree was hosted in urban Hong Kong. Under the theme Gifts for Peace (和平獻禮), there were 4225 participants with 600 from mainland China, Republic of China (Taiwan) and overseas. Many outreaching activities visiting various parts and public facilities in Hong Kong. Other NGOs, like Hong Kong Red Cross and Oxfam were invited introducing their works to Scouts through stall games. Herman Hui, the chairman of World Scout Committee joined the countdown to 2007 jointly held by the association and Radio Television Hong Kong. The campsite suffered from strong gusts, damaging a main gate of pioneering damaged and hurting one participant and one worker. During the summer, coinciding with the international events, the Join-in-Centenary Jamboree (Chinese: 慶祝童軍百週年同步大露營) in Hong Kong was held on High Island Reservoir on Sai Kung Peninsula from 29 July to 2 August 2007.

=== Leader's Mess Night ===
Leader's Mess Night (童軍領袖聚餐) is the annual dining event for leaders, commissioners and lay members. The mess night is usually held in the Hong Kong Scout Centre around 22 February, i.e., the Founder's Day. Participants are required to dress in mess dress. The Chief Commissioner, together with an honourable guest, presides over the mess night.

=== Carlton Trophy ===
Carlton Trophy (嘉爾頓錦標賽), named after the late Carlton W. Tinn, former Deputy Colony Commissioner, is a bi-annual patrol-based competition in the Scout section. Representative patrols from different groups compete on the district and regional level before they can advance to the final competition, which usually consists of camping, pioneering, first aid, backwoods cooking, hiking/orienteering. The Carlton Trophy is considered the highest level skill competition in the Scout section in Hong Kong Scouting. Each year's champion patrol is awarded the trophy colors in the Hong Kong Scout Rally by the Chief Scout of Hong Kong.

Recent winners

Year	Champion	1st runner-up	2nd runner-up	3rd runner-up	Individual event winner							
Year	Champion	1st runner-up	2nd runner-up	3rd runner-up	Campsite Inspection	Campsite Cooking	Campsite Construction	Wilderness Challenge	First-Aid	Pioneering	Backwoods Cooking	Community & Environment
2006	2nd Shap Pat Heung Group	15th Hong Kong Group	1st Hong Kong Group	136th Kowloon Group	----	1st Hong Kong Group	2nd Shap Pat Heung Group	2nd Shap Pat Heung Group	117th East Kowloon Group	15th Hong Kong Group	2nd Shap Pat Heung Group	----
2008	15th Hong Kong Group	12th Hong Kong Group	1st Hong Kong Group	17th Tai Po Group	----	15th Hong Kong Group	15th Hong Kong Group	17th North Tai Po Group	12th Hong Kong Group	1199th New Territory Group	8th North Kwai Chung Group	----
2010	16th Hong Kong Group	15th Hong Kong Group	117th East Kowloon Group	93rd Kowloon Group	----	16th Hong Kong Group	16th Hong Kong Group	16th Hong Kong Group	117th East Kowloon Group	16th Hong Kong Group	53rd Kowloon Group	93rd Kowloon Group
2012	10th Hong Kong Group	16th Hong Kong Group	13th North Kwai Chung Group	17th North Tai Po Group	10th Hong Kong Group	16th Hong Kong Group	16th Hong Kong Group	13th North Kwai Chung Group	10th Hong Kong Group	17th North Tai Po Group	10th Hong Kong Group	----
2014	16th Hong Kong Group	13th North Kwai Chung Group	67th Kowloon Group	5th Hong Kong Group	13th North Kwai Chung Group	16th Hong Kong Group	16th Hong Kong Group	16th Hong Kong Group	30th Yuen Long West Group	30th Yuen Long West Group	13th North Kwai Chung Group	5th Hong Kong Group

[61]

== See also ==
- Hong Kong Girl Guides Association
- List of World Organization of the Scout Movement members
- Scout Association of Macau
- World Buddhist Scout Brotherhood
- Old District Office North
