= Chau Cham-son =

Hong Kong town planner (1932–2023)

Chau Cham-son OBE, CStJ, JP
- 周湛燊

Chief Commissioner of the Scout Association of Hong Kong
- In office 1985–1996

Chau Cham-son, OBE, CStJ, JP (Chinese: 周湛燊; Jyutping: Zau^{1} Zaam^{1}-san^{1}; 23 August 1932 – 9 October 2023) was the former Director (General) of Buildings and Lands at the then-Department of Buildings and Lands (current the Planning Department and Building Department) at the Hong Kong Government.

He was also the Chief Commissioner of the Scout Association of Hong Kong from 1985 to 1996. He was the son of Sir Tsun-nin Chau.

== Education ==
Chau attended Wah Yan College, an eminent Roman Catholic Jesuit secondary school for boys in Hong Kong, and later graduated from the University of Hong Kong with a degree in Architecture. He qualified as a Registered Architect. He also undertook further post-graduate studies at the University of Liverpool and the University of Melbourne and qualified as a registered town planner.

== Career ==
Chau was the first registered town planner in Hong Kong. Chau He joined the Government in 1960, became the Director of Building Development in 1984 and became the first Director of Buildings and Lands in 1986 before retiring from the Hong Kong Government Civil Service in 1990 after 30 years of public service. He has been described as "instrumental in establishing a fully-fledged town planning office in the 1980s with the modern concept of urban planning". He was made an Officer of the Order of the British Empire in 1987 and a Commander of Order of Saint John in 2002.

He had been a director of China Overseas Land and Investment, Ryoden Development Limited, CITIC Limited and Kowloon Development Company. He was also a member of the Hong Kong Housing Society.

Chau was a steward of the Hong Kong Jockey Club since 1989; from 1998 to 2002 he served as Deputy Chairman.

== Scouting ==
Chau joined the Scout Movement in 1946 as a Boy Scout. He became a scoutmaster in 1949 for his alma mater, the 15th Hong Kong Group of Wah Yan College, Hong Kong. He was appointed assistant district commissioner in 1957 and succeed Tse Ping Fui as district commissioner in 1962. He had been honorary treasurer and deputy chairman of The Scout Association of Hong Kong. He also was chairman of Campsites and Properties Committee between 1978 and 1984.

Chau became chairman of the Scout Association of Hong Kong in 1983 and also chaired the Headquarters Building Management Committee in the crucial period during the fundraising, planning and construction of the 25 storey Hong Kong Scout Centre. Chamson became Chief Commissioner of the Scout Association of Hong Kong in 1985, a post he held for the next 11 years. As the Chief Commissioner, Chau streamlined the organization of the Scout Movement in Hong Kong, and his greatest legacy is the 25-storey Hong Kong Scout Centre, one of the largest, most advanced and well-equipped Scout headquarters in the World.

Chamson served in Asia-Pacific Region (APR) Regional Committee from 1986 to 1992. He was awarded the Bronze Wolf in 1990 and was elected a member of the World Scout Committee (1993–1999). Chau also co-founded the APR Scout Foundation in 1992. By making the first contribution he became its first Foundation Member. He was a Baden Powell Fellow of the World Scout Foundation.

== Death ==
Chau Cham-son died on 9 October 2023, at the age of 91.

== Awards and honours ==
Chau is awarded the Bronze Wolf Award in 1990. He was awarded the APR Scout Medallion (1986) and the APR Distinguished Service Award (1995). He was also a holder of Long Service Medal with four stars signifying he has served faithfully for no less than 55 years as an adult leader of Hong Kong Scouts.
