= George Turner Waldegrave =

British Scout in Hong Kong

Colony Commissioner of the Boy Scout Association, Hong Kong Branch
- In office November 1921 - 1934

Personal details
- Born: 18 March 1889
- Died: 15 May 1966 (aged 77)

The Reverend George Turner Waldegrave MBE (18 March 1889 – 15 May 1966) was the son of Reverend Samuel Edmund Waldegrave and Alice Millett.

He was the Colony Commissioner of the Boy Scout Association, Hong Kong Branch from November 1921 to 1934 and Chaplain in charge of the Seamen’s Institute. Waldegrave is also the founder of the first Sea Scout Group in Hong Kong. On 1934-06-04, he was awarded the MBE (Civil Division). Waldegrave revived the Hong Kong Scouting from its ebb after World War I. He made Hong Kong Scouting incorporated in Hong Kong. Several infrastructure was built, such as the first campsite, Chaiwan Campsite in Chai Wan.

Before his retirement from his commissionership, he was awarded the Silver Wolf, highest honour in The Scout Association.

He held the office of Vicar of Sholing, Southampton from 1935 to 1959.
