= Jean-Baptiste Evariste Charles Pricot de Sainte-Marie =

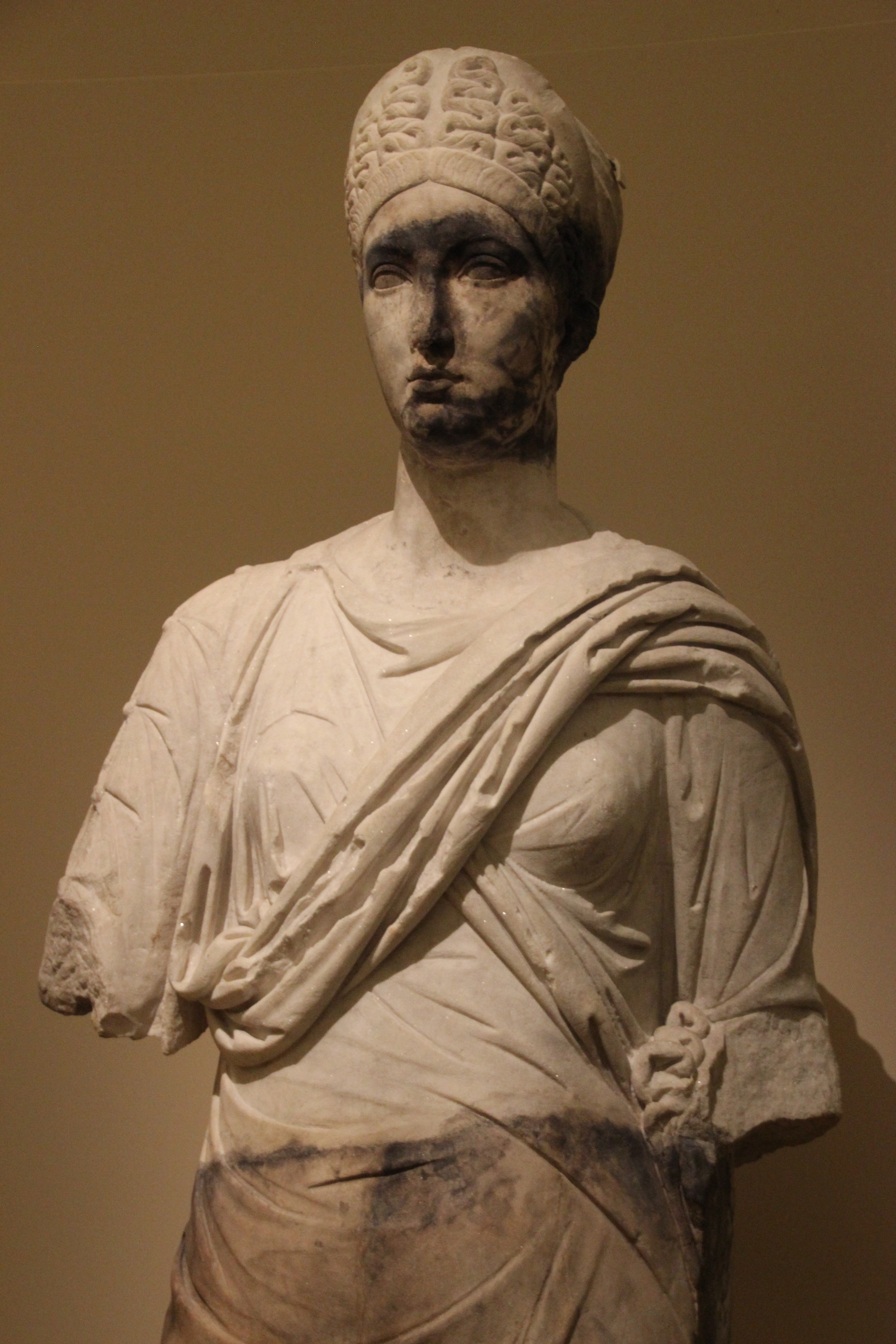
Statue of Vibia Sabina found in the wreck of the Magenta'' in 1995

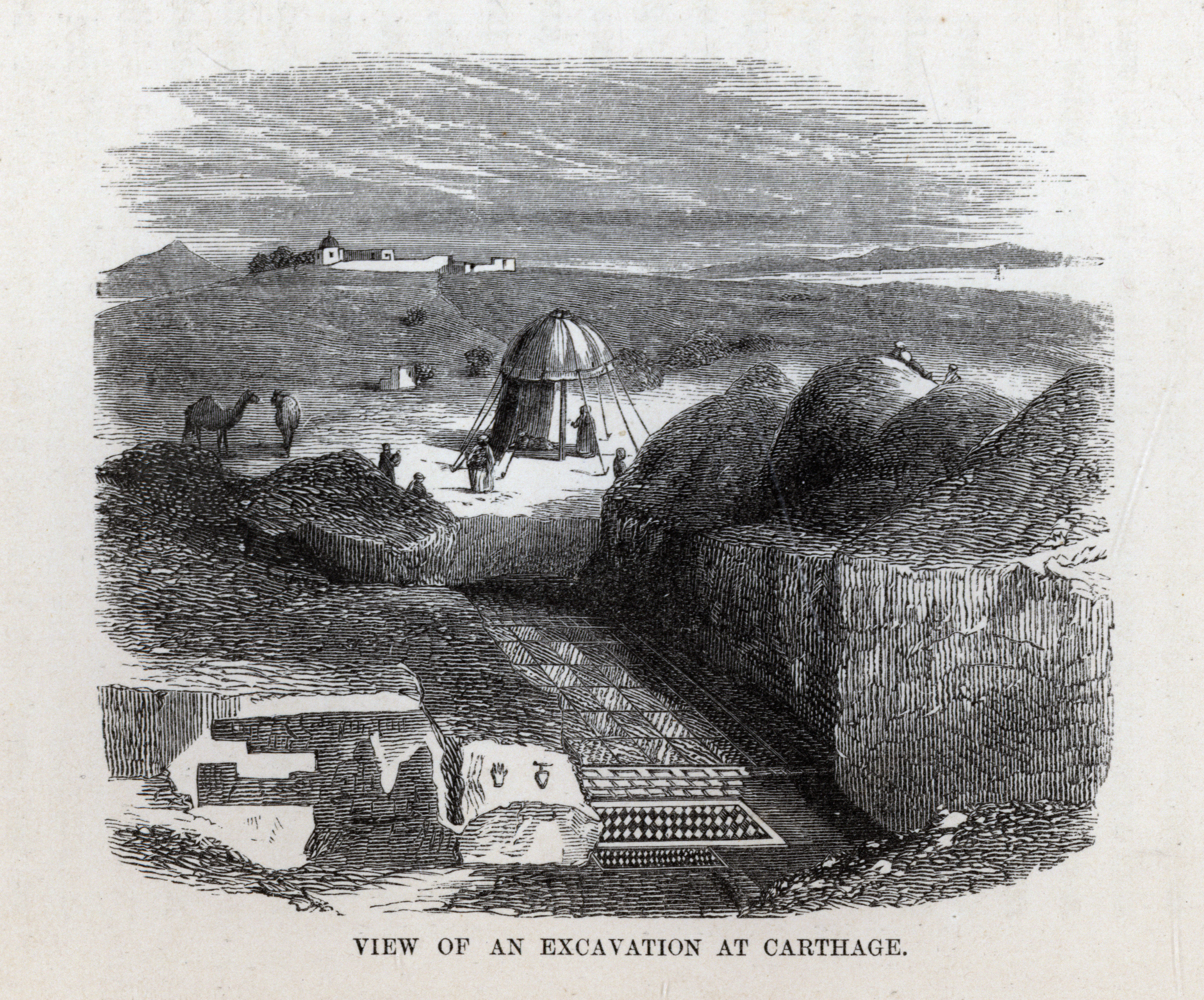
Excavations of the archaeological site of Carthage, engraving by Nathan Davis, 1861

Jean-Baptiste Evariste Charles Pricot de Sainte-Marie, born 1 October 1843 in Paris and died on 10 February 1899 in Madrid, was a French diplomat, archaeologist and epigrapher. He was the son of Jean-Baptiste Evariste Marie Pricot de Sainte-Marie.

== Diplomatic career ==
- Dragoman in Tunis (1862–1865);
- Dragoman chancellor in Jeddah (1865–1866) then in Sarajevo (1866) in Pashalik of Bosnia;
- Consul in Mostar (1870–1873);
- First dragoman in Tunis (1873–1876);
- Vice-consul in Ragusa (1876–1878);
- Consul in Syros (1879) and Salonica (1889)
- Ended his career in Santander (1889) then, after the closure of the consulate, was assigned as archivist to the consulate of Madrid.

== Archaeology ==
Pricot de Sainte-Marie contributed to the Geographical Society and sent statements of inscriptions from Bosnia to the Academy of Inscriptions and Belles-Lettres.

His main activity consisted of exploration missions in Tunisia between 1873 and 1876, both on the sites of Carthage and Utica. Through his explorations, he was one of the pioneers of archaeology in the Beylik of Tunis.

His name remains attached to the archaeological site of Carthage as well as to the ship Magenta, which sank off the coast of Toulon in 1875 with many Carthaginian antiquities (including the more than 2,000 Pricot de Sainte-Marie steles) and which was the subject of underwater archaeological excavations between 1995 and 1998.

== Publications ==
- Les Slaves méridionaux, leur origine et leur établissement dans l'Illyrie, Paris, 1874
- Mission à Carthage, Paris, 1884

== Bibliography ==
- Jean-Pierre Laporte (2002), "Les Pricot de Sainte Marie, père et fils, et l'exploration géographique et archéologique de la Tunisie et de Carthage", in Claude Briand-Ponsart et Sylvie Crogiez (ed.), L'Afrique du Nord antique et médiévale : mémoire, identité et imaginaire (in French), Rouen: Université de Rouen, pp. 207–273, ISBN 2877753255
