= Rafael de Miguel González =

Spanish geographer

Rafael de Miguel González (born 1971) is a Spanish geographer and professor at the University of Zaragoza. He specialises in geography education and has also conducted research in urban geography, urban and regional planning, and geopolitics.

Miguel was born in Zaragoza in 1971. He studied geography and history at the University of Zaragoza and urban planning at Nancy-Université and the Paris School of Urban Planning. He obtained his doctorate at the University of Paris. He is the president of the European Association of Geographers, a member of the board of the Real Sociedad Geográfica, and a fellow of the Academia Europaea and the Real Academia de Nobles y Bellas Artes de San Luis de Zaragoza. He was an educational advisor to the government of Aragon from 1995 to 1999.
