= List of geographical societies =

Geographical societies by country

This is a list of geographical societies.

== International ==
- EUGEO-Association of Geographical Societies in Europe
- EUROGEO-European Association of Geographers
- European Geography Association
- Gamma Theta Upsilon
- International Geographical Union
- World Geographers Association

== Australia ==
- Royal Geographical Society of Queensland
- Royal Geographical Society of South Australia

== Belgium ==
- Société Royale Belge de Géographie

== Canada ==
- Canadian Association of Geographers
- Royal Canadian Geographical Society

== Egypt ==
- Egyptian Geographic Society

== France ==
- Société de Géographie

== Germany ==
- Gesellschaft für Erdkunde zu Berlin

== Hong Kong ==
- Hong Kong Critical Geography Group
- Hong Kong Geographical Association

== Italy ==
- Società Geografica Italiana

== Mexico ==
- Sociedad Mexicana de Geografía y Estadística

== Netherlands ==
- Royal Dutch Geographical Society

== Norway ==
- Norwegian Geographical Society

== Peru ==
- Geographical Society of Lima

== Portugal ==
- Lisbon Geographic Society

== Russia ==
- Russian Geographical Society

== Saudi Arabia ==
- Saudi Geographical Society

== Slovenia ==
- Association of Slovenian Geographers

== United Kingdom ==
- Geographical Association
- Royal Geographical Society
- Royal Scottish Geographical Society

== United States ==
- American Geographical Society
- Association of American Geographers
- Association of Pacific Coast Geographers
- Illinois Geographical Society
- National Council for Geographic Education
- National Geographic Society
- Society of Woman Geographers

== Uruguay ==
- Instituto Histórico y Geográfico del Uruguay
