= Pricot de Sainte-Marie steles =

Group of Punic funerary steles

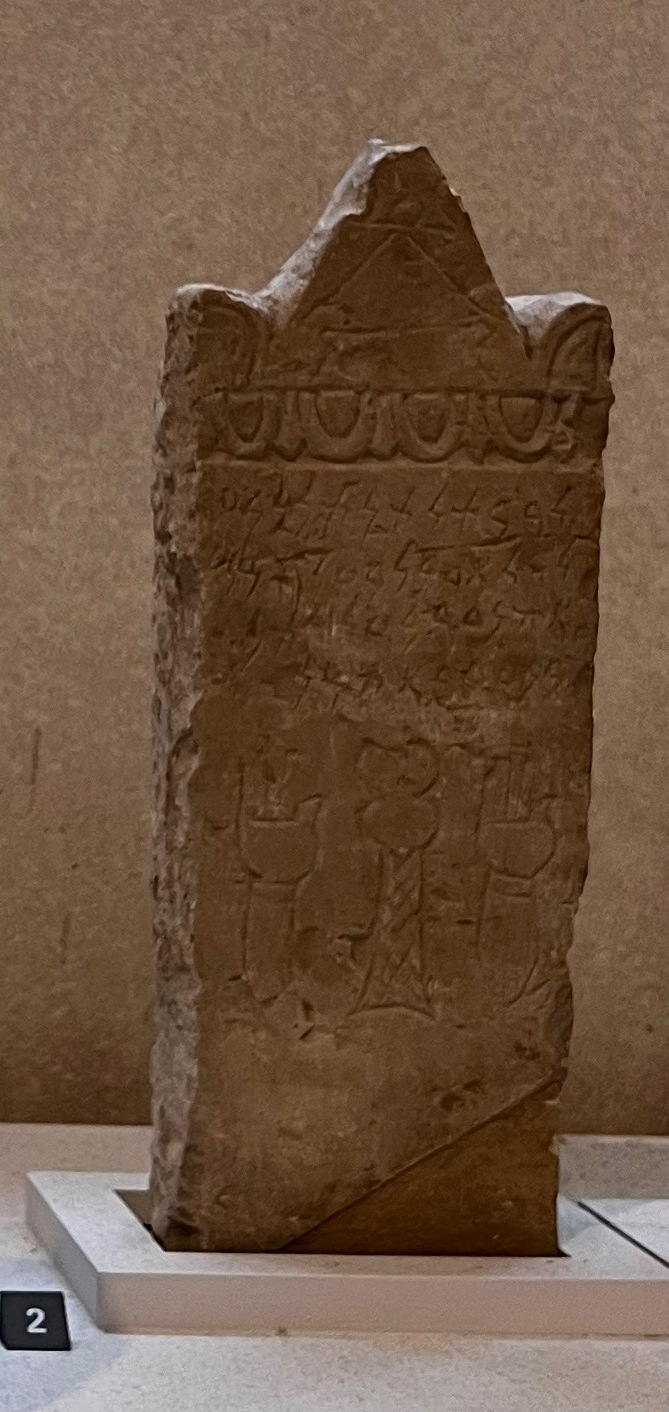
AO 5137 (CIS I 585) on display at the Louvre in 2022

The Pricot de Sainte-Marie steles are more than 2,000 Punic funerary steles found in Carthage (modern Tunisia) near the ancient forum by French diplomat Jean-Baptiste Evariste Charles Pricot de Sainte-Marie in the 1870s. The find was dramatic both in the scale—the largest single discovery of Canaanite and Aramaic inscriptions—and also due to the finds almost being lost in the sinking of the French ironclad Magenta at Toulon.

The steles were found in their secondary location, having been re-used as building material for a wall in a structure erected after the city had been destroyed by the Romans.

The steles provide evidence of Carthaginian religion prior to the Roman occupation.

Pricot de Sainte-Marie obtained financial support from the French Académie des Inscriptions et Belles-Lettres to create a complication for publication in the Corpus Inscriptionum Semiticarum. He took stampings of all the 2,170 steles he excavated, and had sent these to France prior to the sinking of the Magenta. They were later compiled and published in the Corpus Inscriptionum Semiticarum.

After the sinking of the Magenta, a large number of the steles were recovered. They now reside at the Bibliothèque nationale de France and the Louvre.

== Recovery ==
Around 1,500 of the steles were recovered shortly after the sinking.

On 19 April 1994, the French Groupe de Recherche en Archéologie Navale led by Max Guérout, located the Magenta 50 feet below the surface, under four feet of sediment. The expedition had been catalyzed in 1992 by historian Serge Lancel and an amateur French archaeologist, Jean-Pierre Laporte. Guérout's team carried out 843 dives between 1994 and 1998, recovering 115 steles and fragments from the wreckage. Guérout estimated in 1999 that nearly 400 more steles may remain in the wreck.

== Examples of inscriptions ==
Text KAI 86 (= CIS I 264 = KI 76) reads:

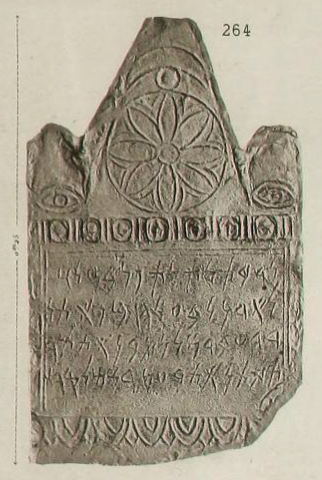
(line 1)	LRBT LTNT PNB‘L	[Stele dedicated] to the Lady Tinnīt-Phanebal
(1-2)	W/L’DN LB‘L ḤMN	and to the Lord Baal-hammon,
(2-3)	’Š N/DR ‘BDMLKT	that Abdmilkot has vowed,
(3-4)	BN ’ŠTR/TYTN	the son of Astartyaton,
(4)	’Š B‘M RŠ MLQRT	a member of the people of Rūs Milqart [= Heraclea Minoa, Sicily].

KAI 87 (= CIS I 221 = KI 80 = AO 31819). Ḥōt-’Ilot, the woman who ordered this stele, belonged to Carthage's elite: both her father and grandfather were head of state in Carthage (suffes):

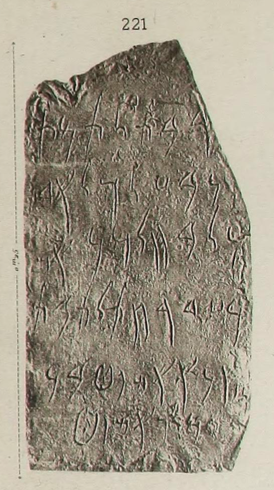
(lines 1-2)	[L]RBT LTMT / [P]NB‘L	[Stele dedicated] [to] the Lady Ti[nn]īt-[Ph]anebal
(2-3)	WL’D/N LBḤLMN	and to the Lord Baal-hammon,
(3-4)	’Š / N‘DR ḤTLT	that Ḥōt-’Ilot has vowed,
(4-5)	BT / ḤN’ ’ŠPṬ	the daughter of Hanno the suffes,
(5-6)	BN / ‘ZMLK ’ŠPṬ	the son of ‘Az-Milk the suffes.

The proper names in those inscriptions are common ones. Their meanings are usually evident: ’Abdmilkot ("servant of the Queen"), Astartyaton ("Astarte has given"), Ḥōt-’Ilot ("’Ilot is [my] sister"), Hanno and Baalhanno ("he/Baal has shown him favor").

== Concordance ==
=== Summary ===
In all, Pricot de Sainte-Marie documented 2,576 Carthaginian tombstones:

- 184 in private collections (see below)
- 19 excavated 1874-75 sent to the Louvre
- 2170 excavated 1874-75, stampings sent to the Bibliotheque Nationale
- 203 further steles sent in 1878

=== Private collections ===
Pricot de Sainte-Marie documented 184 steles in private collections:

Collections	Mohammed Khaznadar (Manouba museum)	Saint-Louis museum	Bourgade inscriptions	Fenner	Engley	Tulin de la Tunisie	Gouvet	Lunel	Rubichon	Weber	Bottary	Chevarrier	Total
Number of inscriptions	124	18	14	9	5	4	2	2	2	2	1	1	184

=== 2170 inscription stampings sent to the AIBL ===
Pricot de Sainte-Marie had taken stampings of all the steles he excavated, and had sent these to France prior to the sinking of the Magenta. They were later compiled and published in the Corpus Inscriptionum Semiticarum.

Dates inscriptions received by Académie des Inscriptions et Belles-Lettres	Comptes rendus des séances de l'Académie des Inscriptions et Belles-Lettres	Inscription number
6 Nov 1874	1874, p. 314.	1 to 34
(20 Nov)?		35 to 54
(27 Nov)?		55 to 100
4 Dec 1874	1874, p. 315.	101 to 150
11 Dec 1874	1874, p. 316.	151 to 200
18 Dec 1874	1874, p. 317-318.	151 to 200
18 Dec 1874		201 to 300
8 Jan 1875	1874, p. 2.	301 to 350
22 Jan 1875	1875, p. 4.	351 to 500
29 Jan 1875	1875, p. 5.	501 to 600
29 Jan 1875		601 to 700
5 Feb 1875	1875, p. 6.	701 to 800
12 Feb 1875	1875, p. 7.	801 to 901
19 Feb 1875	1875, p. 8.	902 to 950
12 Mar 1875	1875, p. 11.	951 to 1000
(19 ou 26 Mar 1875) ?		1001 to 1100
2 Apr 1875	1875, p. 95.	1101 to 1200
2 Apr 1875		1201 to 1300
23 Apr 1875	1875, p. 98.	1301 to 1500
30 Apr 1875	1875, p. 99.	1501 to 1600
21 May 1875	1875, p. 103	1601 to 1900
4 Jun 1875	1875, p. 107.	1901 to 2000
13 Aug 1875	1875, p. 195.	2001 to 2082
12 Nov 1875	1875, p. 292.	2083 to 2133
10 Dec 1875	1875, p. 297.	2134 to 2147
(17-24 Dec 1875) ?		2148 to 2152
14 Jan 1876	1876, p. 5.	2153 to 2170

=== CIS ===
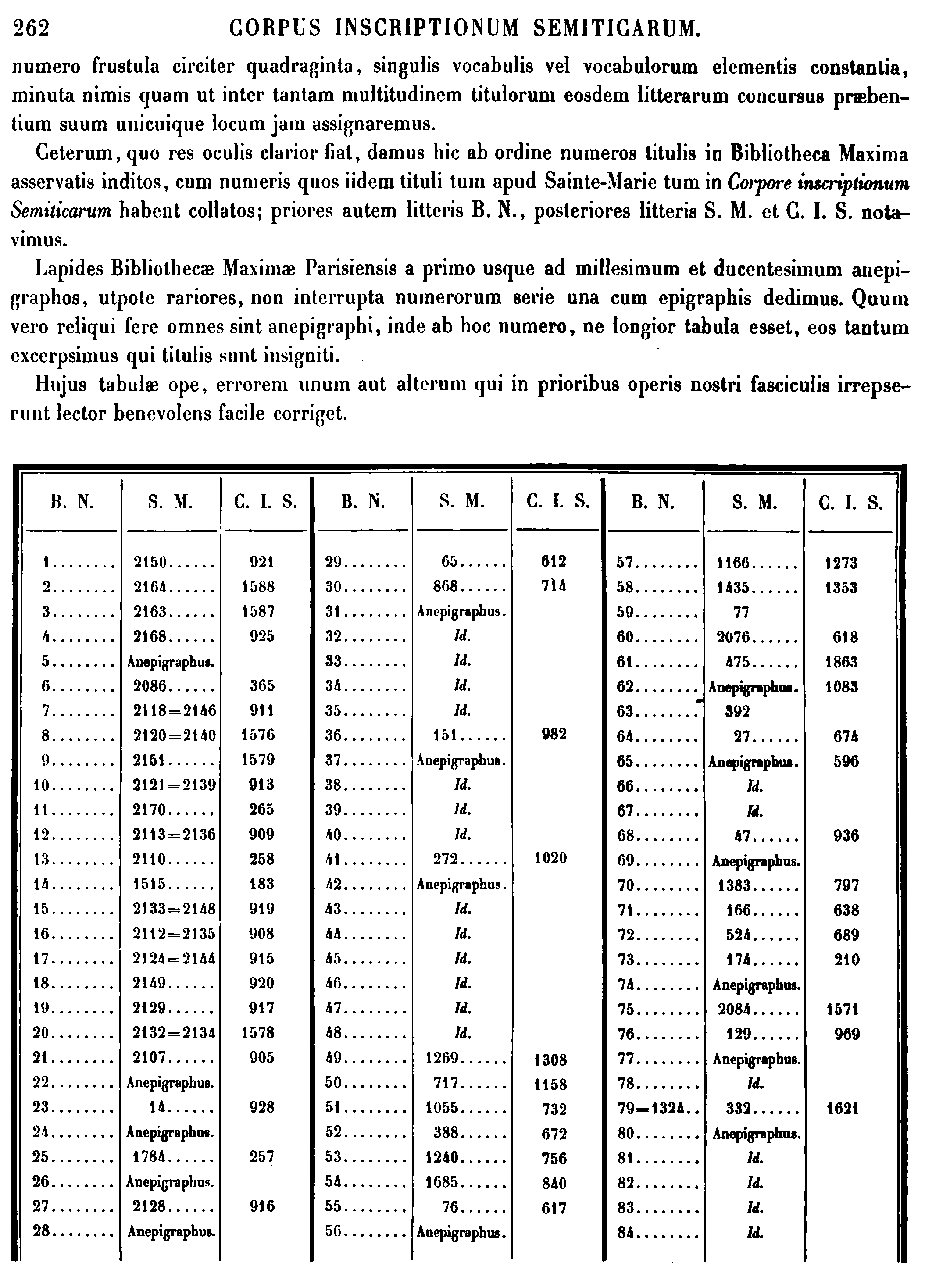

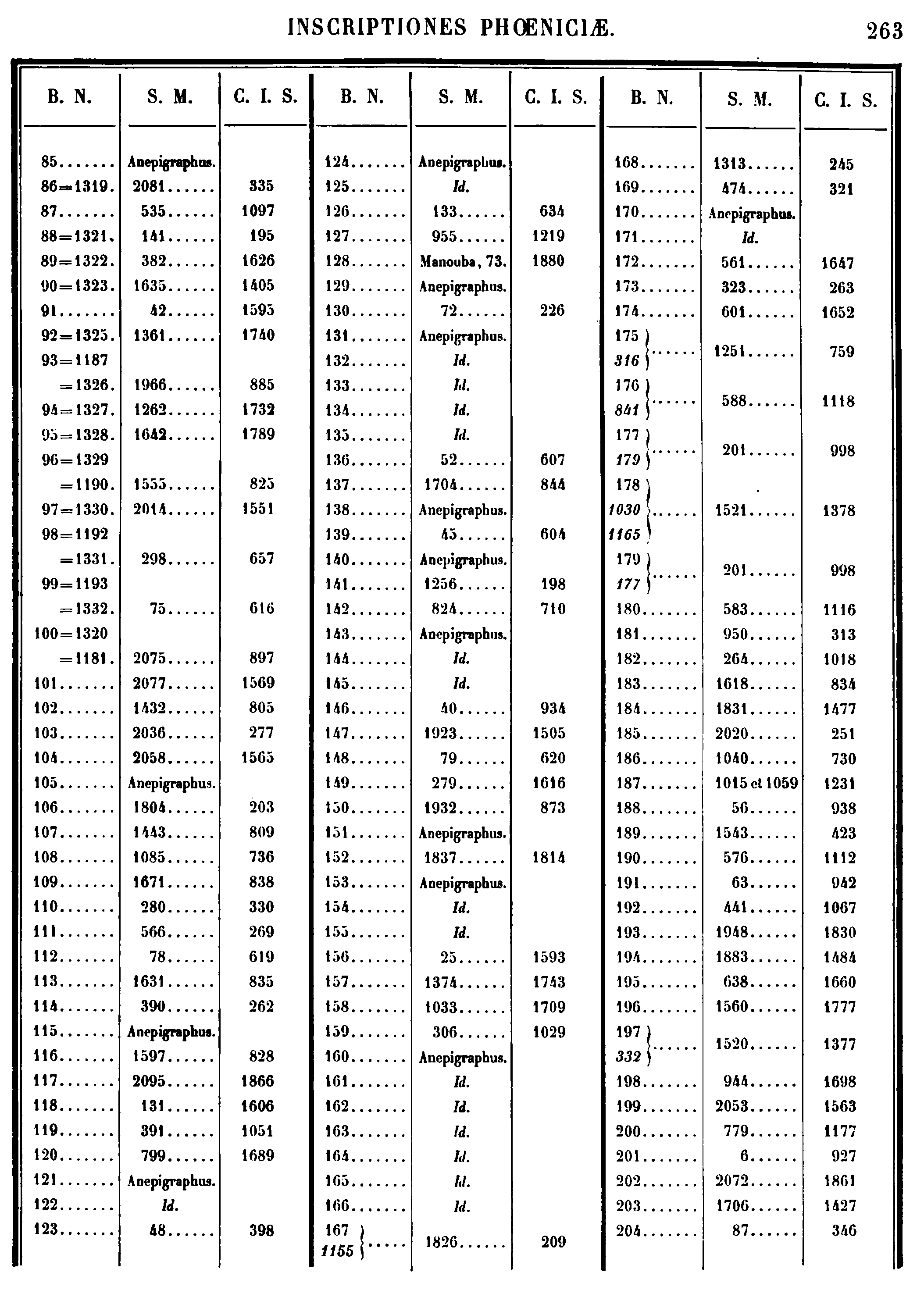

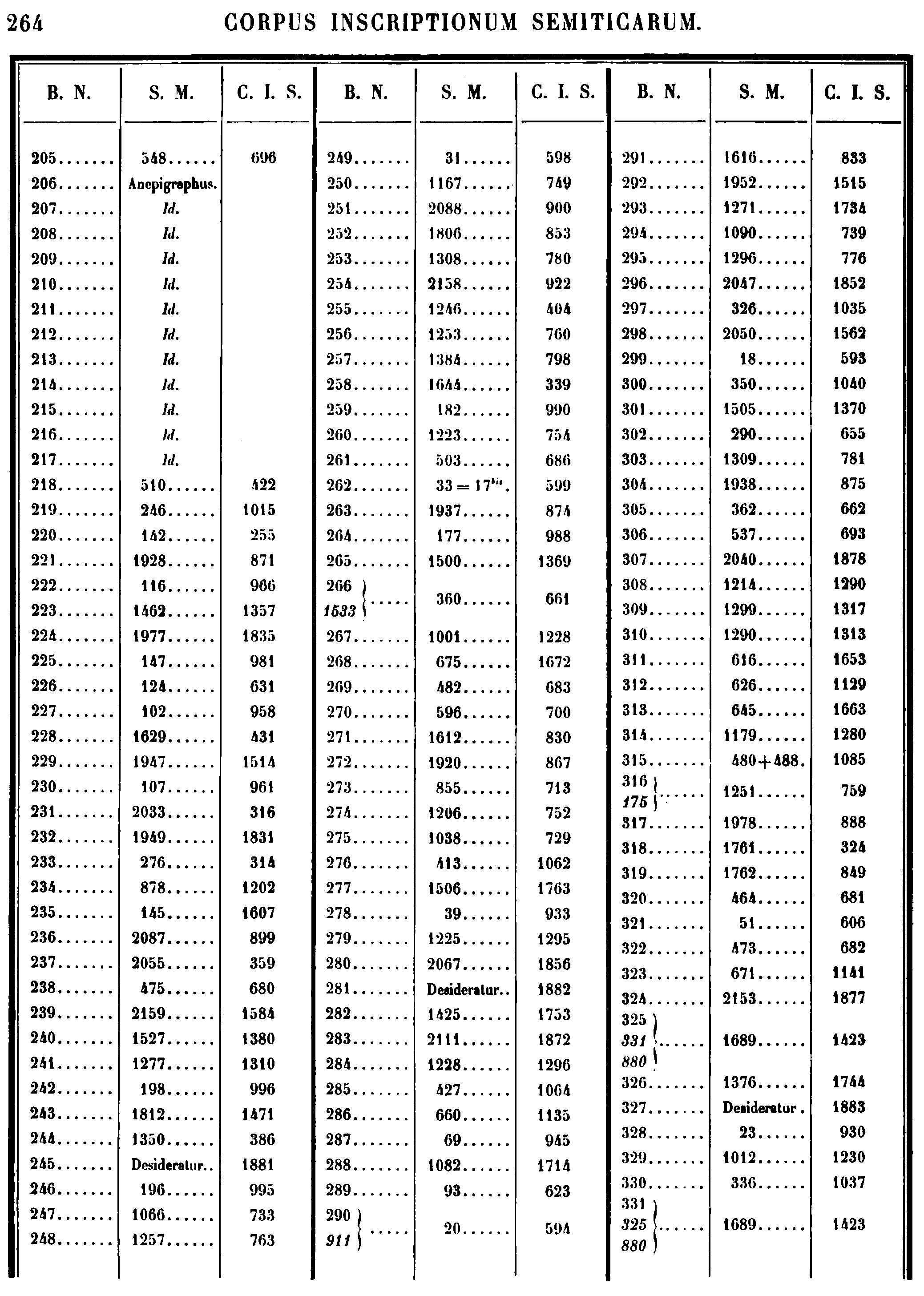

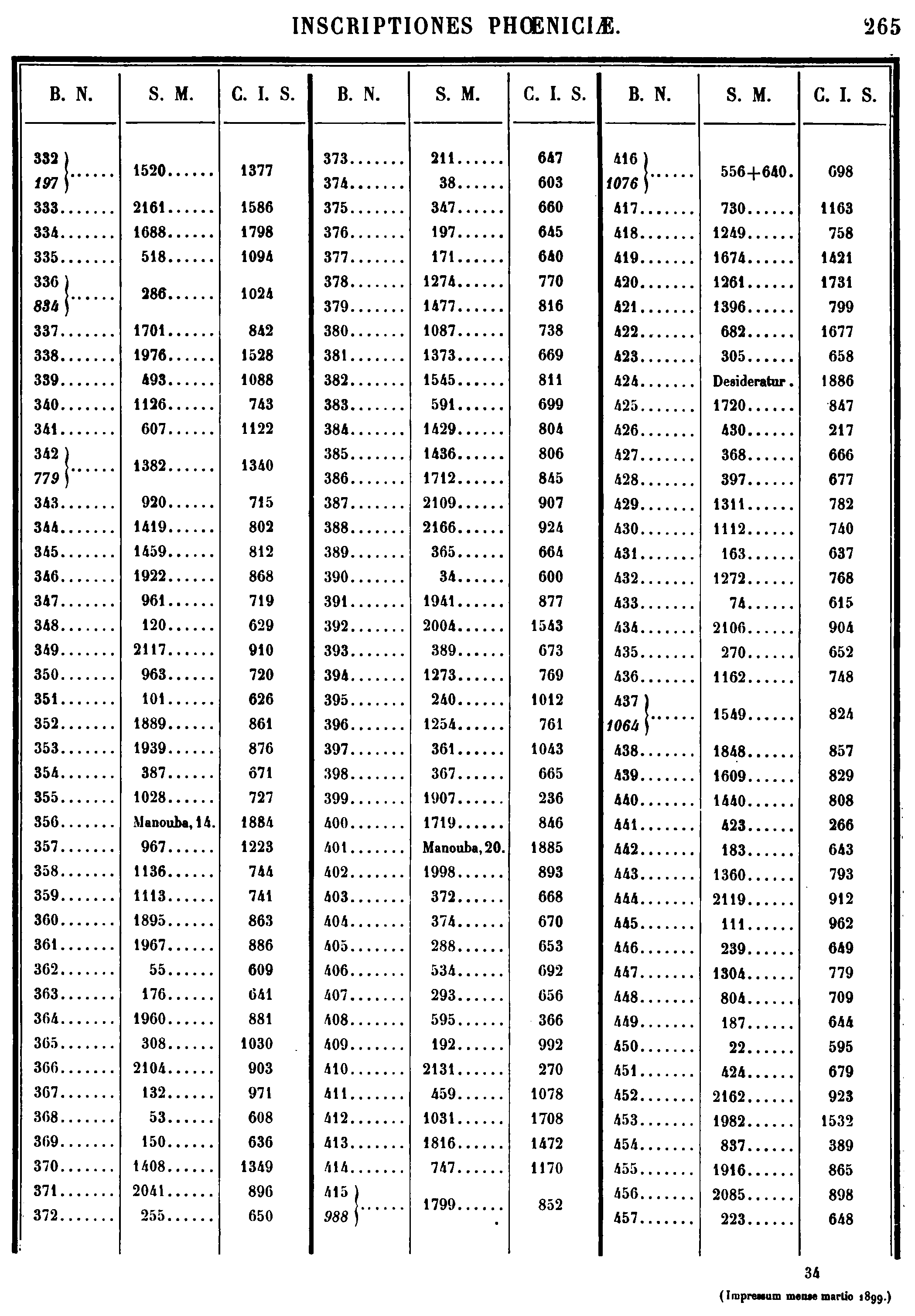

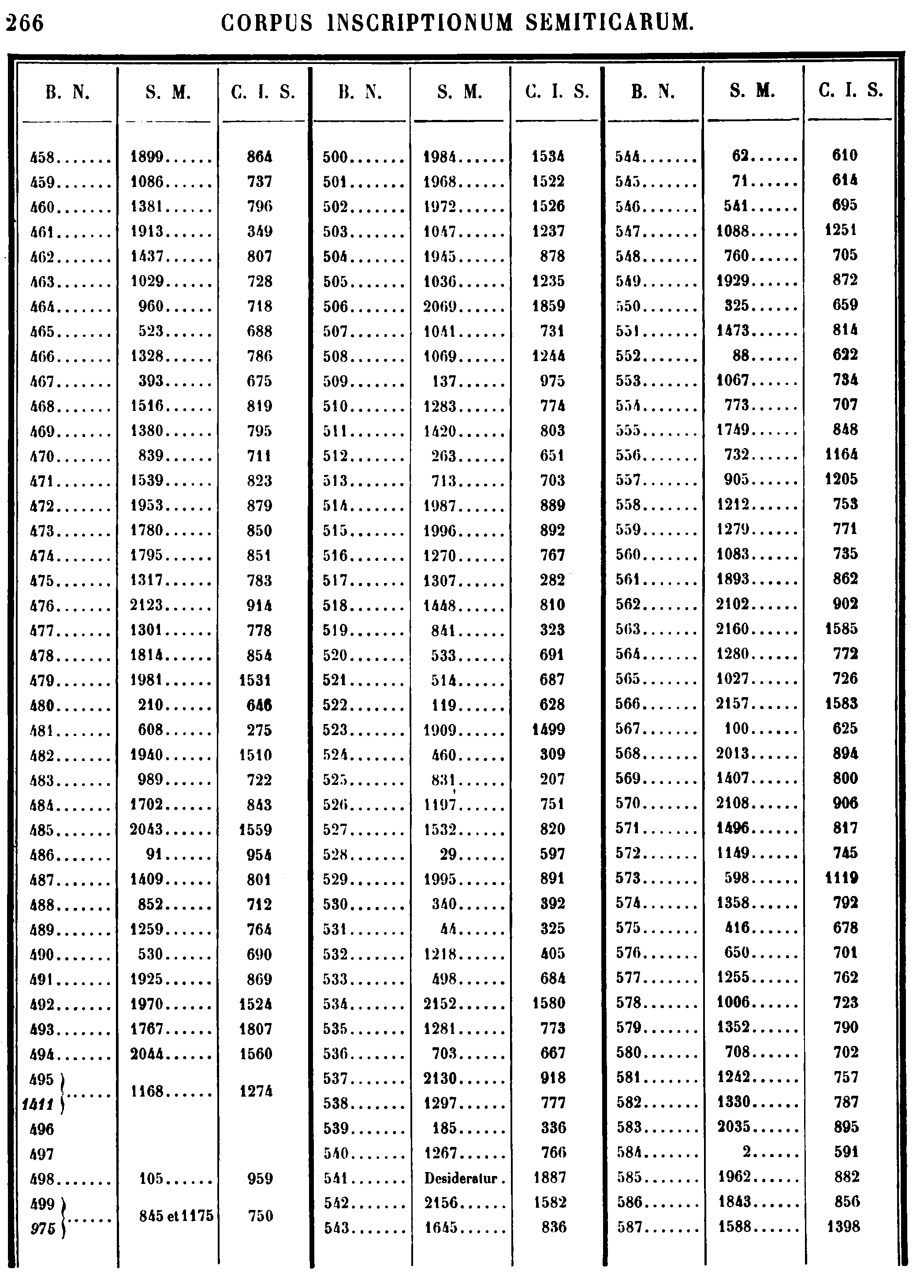

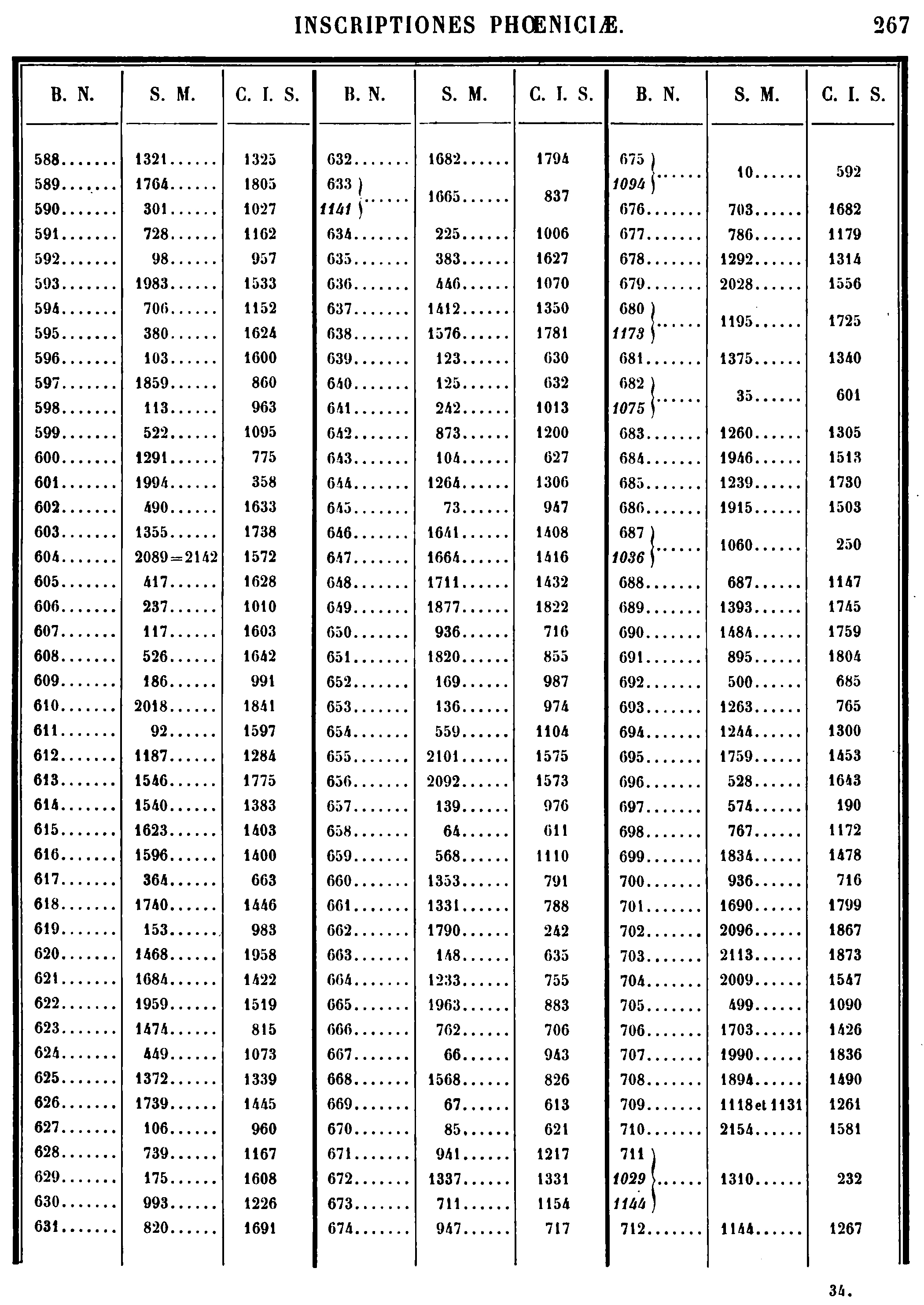

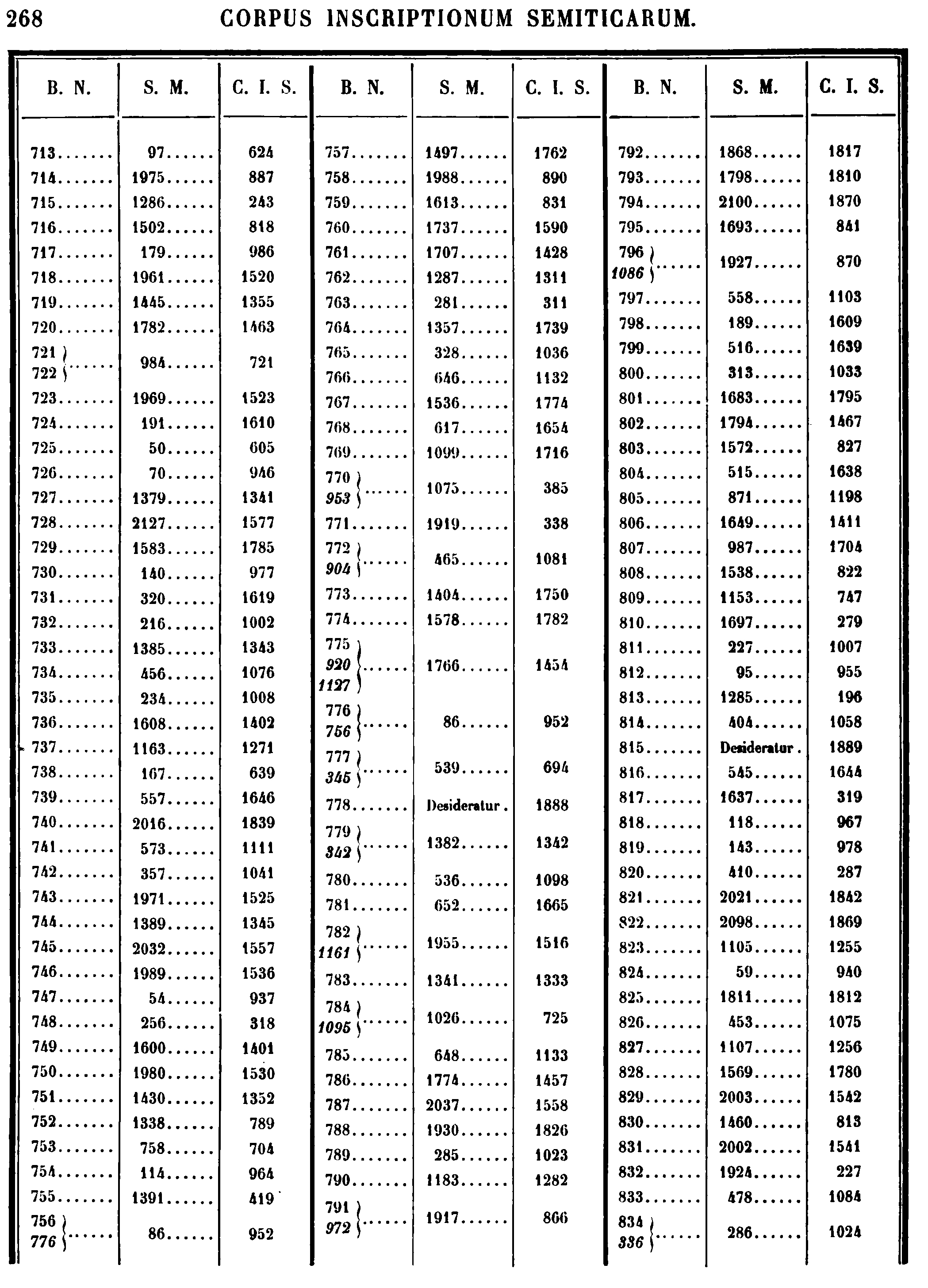

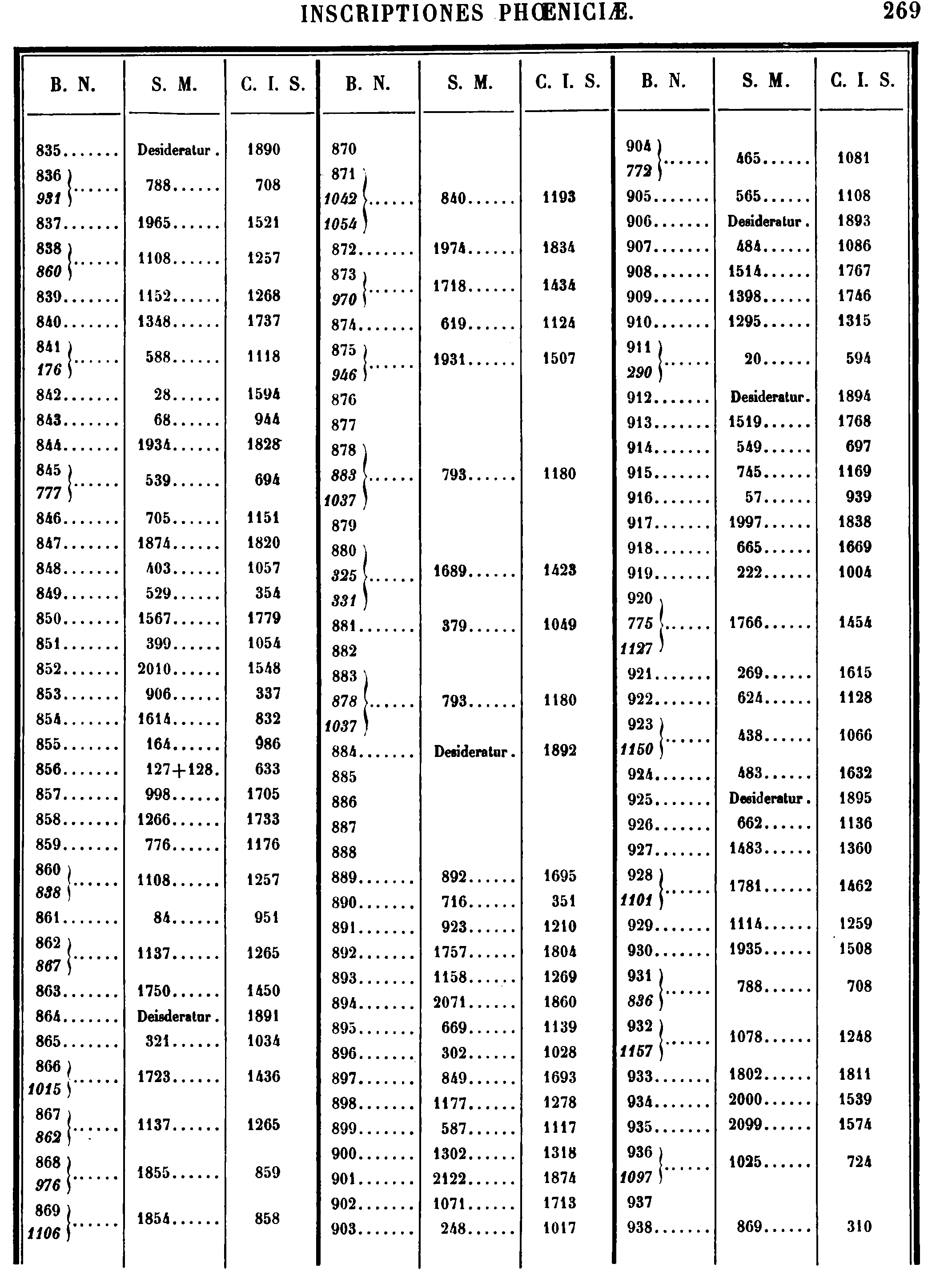

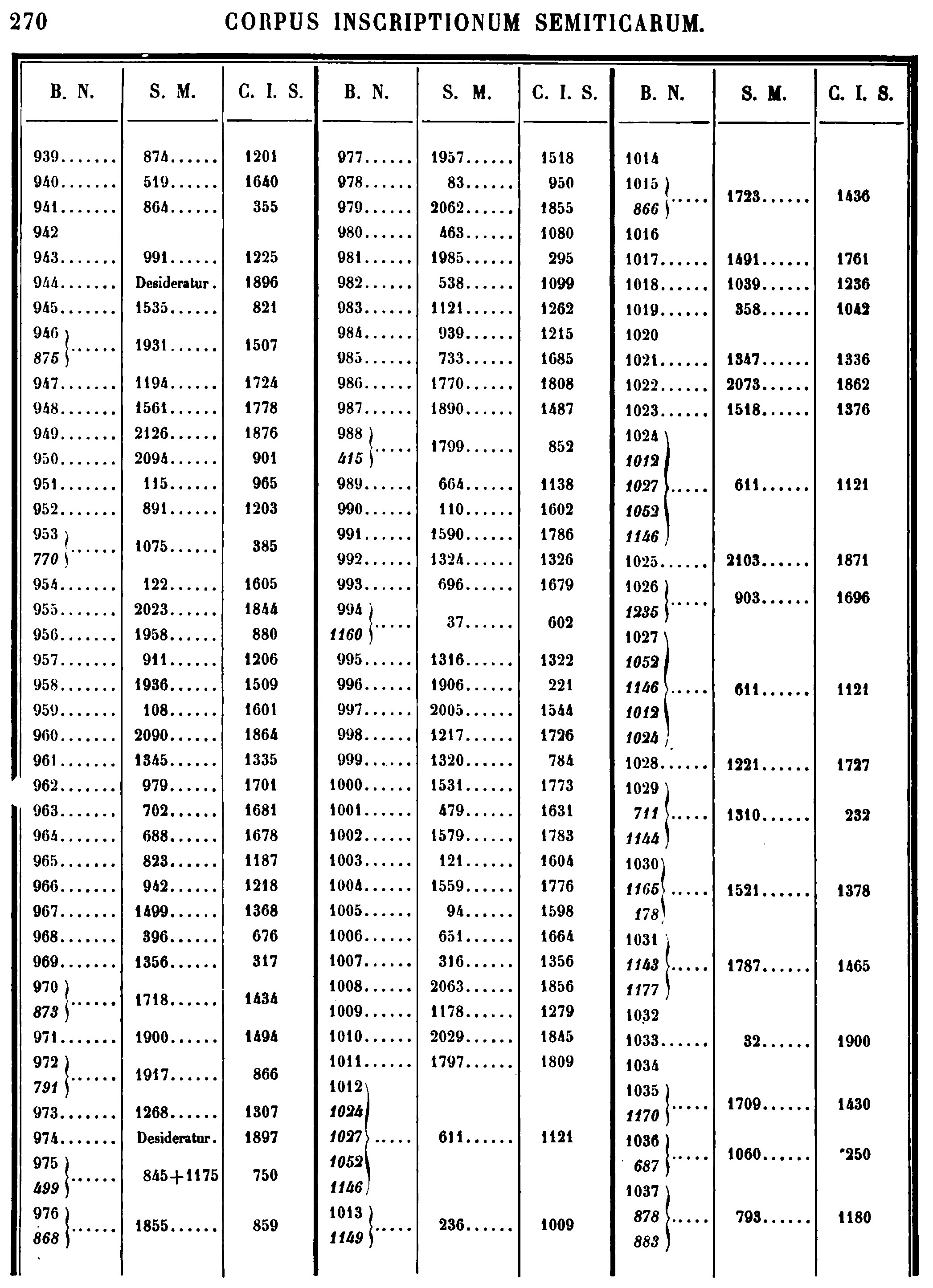

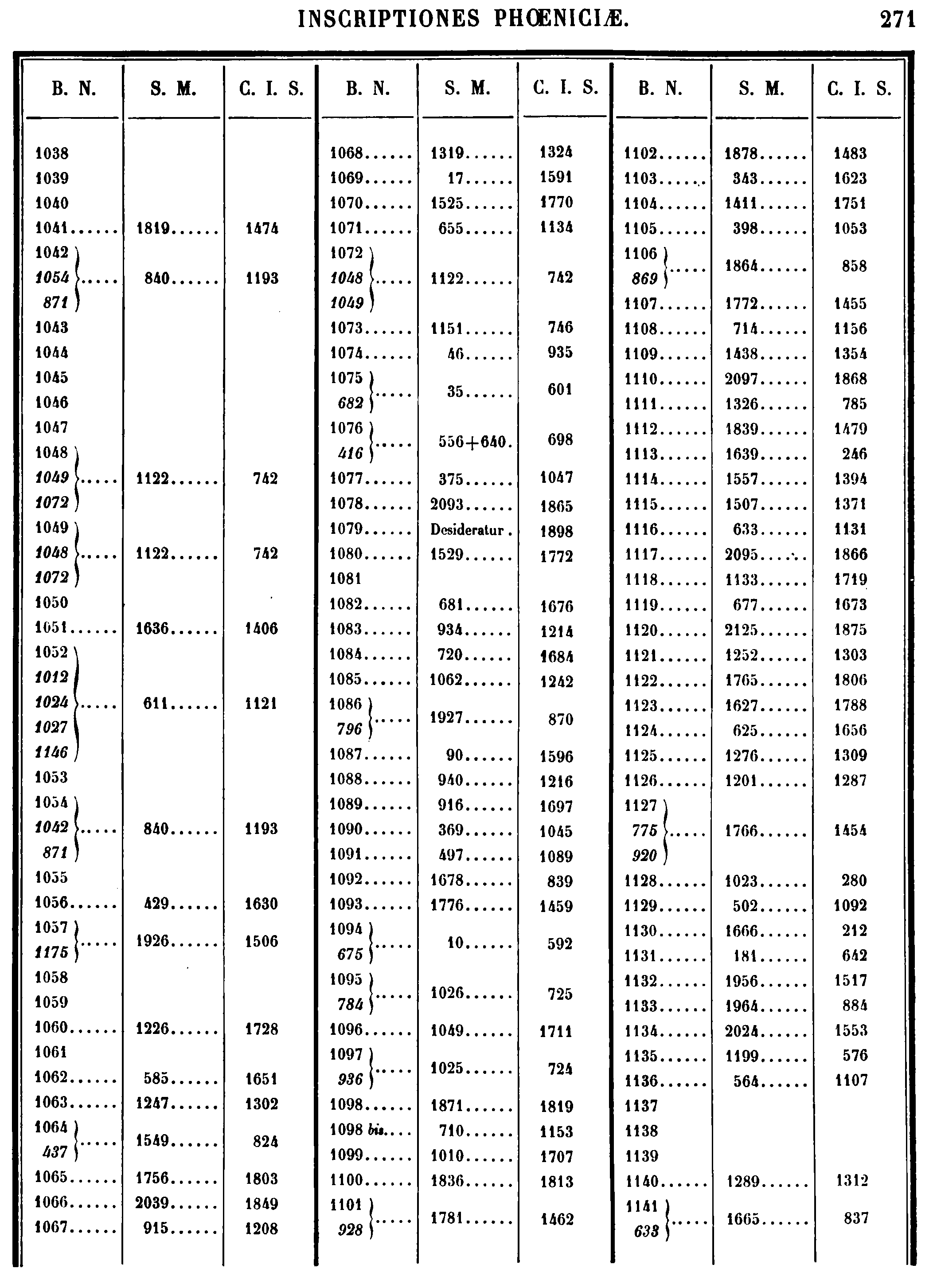

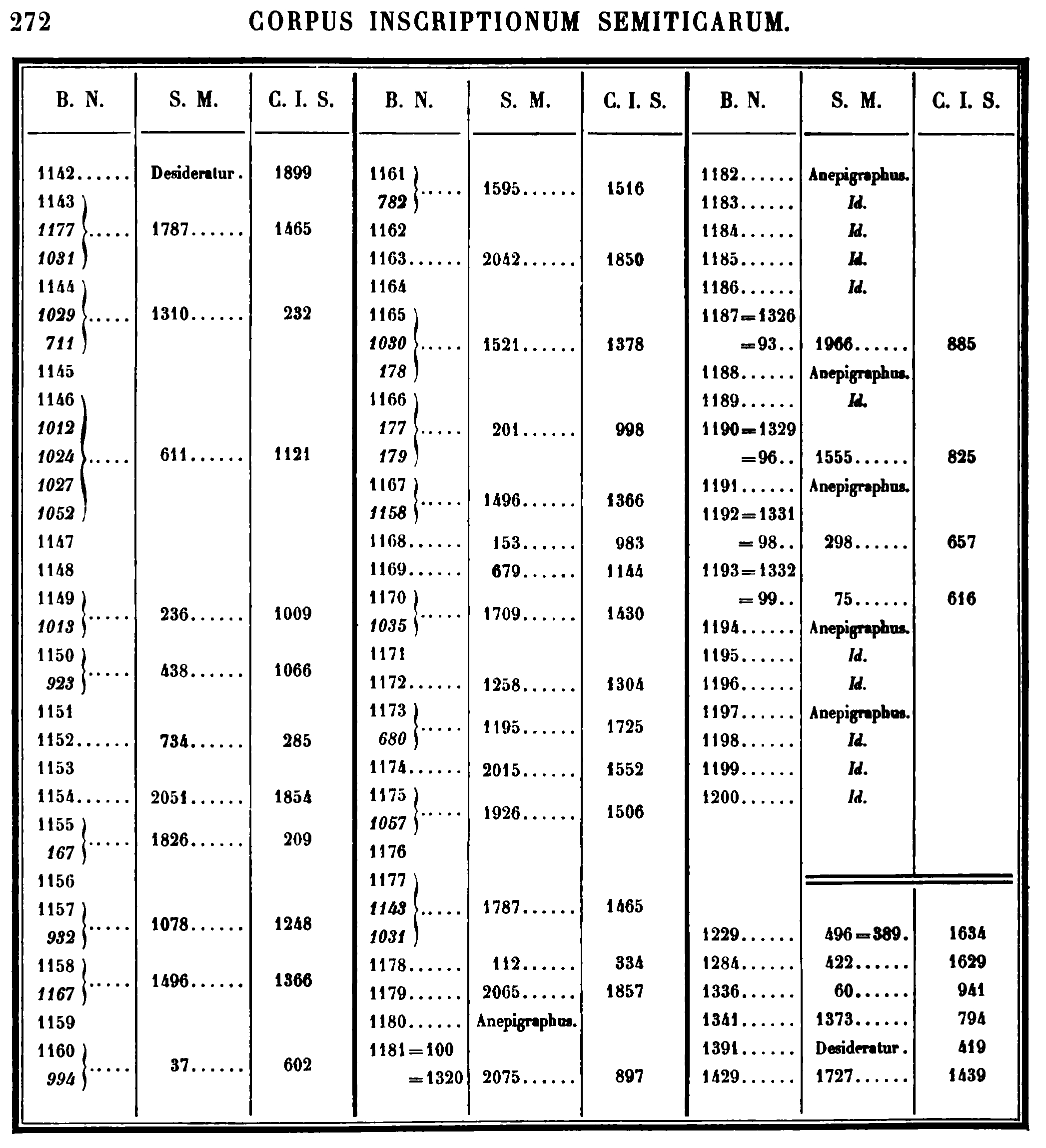

=== Later concordances ===
Image	Discovered	Date	Location Found	Current Location	Concordance						
Image	Discovered	Date	Location Found	Current Location	KAI	CIS / RÉS	NE	KI	NSI	TSSI	Ref.
An inscription	1874		Carthage		86	I 264		76			
An inscription			Carthage		87	I 221		80			
An inscription			Carthage			I 198		77			SM 1256
An inscription			Carthage			I 236		78			SM 1907, BM 399
An inscription			Carthage			I 250		79			SM 1060
An inscription			Carthage			I 269			49		SM 566, BM 111

== Bibliography ==
- de Sainte-Marie, J.B.E.C.P. (1876). Les ruines de Carthage (in French). Aux Bureaux de l'Explorateur.
- de Sainte-Marie, É.C.P. (1884). Mission à Carthage (in French). E. Leroux.
- Laporte, Jean-Pierre (2002). "Carthage : les stèles Sainte-Marie". Bulletin de la Société Nationale des Antiquaires de France. 1999 (1): 133–146. doi:10.3406/bsnaf.2002.10363. ISSN 0081-1181.
- LAPORTE, Jean-Pierre (2017-04-10). "Les Pricot de Sainte-Marie, père et fils, et l'archéologie de la Tunisie et de Carthage". Academia.edu (in French).
- Lancel Serge. La fouille de l'épave du Magenta et le sauvetage de sa cargaison archéologique. In: Comptes rendus des séances de l'Académie des Inscriptions et Belles-Lettres, 139ᵉ année, N. 3, 1995. pp. 813-816. DOI: 10.3406/crai.1995.15521
- Berger, Philippe (1876). "Lettre à M. Fr. Lenormant". NN (in French). doi:10.11588/DIGLIT.25049.46.
- Lenormant, F. (1876). "Quelques observations sur symboles religieux des stèles puniques, [2]". NN (in French). doi:10.11588/DIGLIT.25049.56.
- Berger, Philippe (1877). "Lettre à M. Fr. Lenormant sur les représentations figurées de stèles puniques de la Bibliothèque Nationale, [1]". NN (in French). doi:10.11588/DIGLIT.25600.8.
