= Gesellschaft für Erdkunde zu Berlin =

- Official logo
- Abbreviation: GfE Berlin
- Formation: April 20, 1828; 198 years ago
- Location: Berlin, Germany
- Chairman: Hartmut Asche
- Secretary-General: Christof Ellger
- Website: www.gfe-berlin.de

The Gesellschaft für Erdkunde zu Berlin (Berlin Geographical Society) is a geographical society based in Berlin, Germany. It was founded in 1828.

== History ==
The Gesellschaft für Erdkunde zu Berlin was founded in 1828 by some of the foremost geographers of its time, including the main founder Carl Ritter and founding member Alexander von Humboldt. It is one of the oldest geographical societies.

The Gustav Nachtigal Medal (Gustav-Nachtigal-Medaille), named after German surgeon explorer Gustav Nachtigal, was awarded from 1896 until the 1990s.

== Description ==
Today the society's aim still is to promote the exchange and spreading of geographical knowledge.

The society publishes the scientific journal Die Erde (Earth), which has been published since 1853. It also sponsors young scientists with the Humboldt-Ritter-Penck-Preis (Humboldt Ritter Penck Award).
