= EUROGEO-European Association of Geographers =

European scientific society

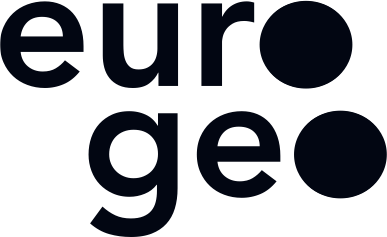
EUROGEO Logo

EUROGEO is a European scientific society, which networks geographers. It is an international non-governmental organisation. Since 1987 EUROGEO has been a participative member of the Conference of International NGOs of the Council of Europe. The association is involved in national and international activities and projects in geography including those related to education and training. It is a not profit organisation, which aims to develop, support and promote policies designed to advance the status of geography; establish and promote cross-border cooperation; promote education and training in geography from a European perspective and represent nationally and internationally the views of its members.

EUROGEO activities include organising events, producing publications, supporting geographers in their jobs and careers, the teaching of geographical sciences, identifying and promoting good practise, co-operating with the European Union, Council of Europe, European Commission and other relevant organisations; lobbying at global, European and where relevant national level, providing a forum for the discussion of matters of common interest to geographers, giving advice on geography and making recommendations to policy makers.

== History ==
=== Origin ===
EUROGEO was first established in 1979 under the name of European Standing Conference of Geography Teachers Association (ESCGTA). In the beginning it was an association of associations. In 1994, when other European countries became members, the association took the name of its bulletin, EUROGEO: European Network of Geography Teachers´ Associations. The principal aims of that organisation were to advise and promote the European dimension in geographical education and teaching about the countries of Europe as a contribution towards the development of a European dimension in education. Members were geography teacher associations and geographical associations from around Europe. Presidents of these associations or their representatives attended the bi-annual meetings that were originally organised and funded by the European Commission in Brussels.

=== First activities ===
EUROGEO was led by a small committee of volunteers headed by Henk Meier representing the Dutch Geographical Association (KNAG). In between each of these conferences a EUROGEO bulletin was published.

Conferences and Bulletin of EUROGEO (1980–1996)
Conference year	Place	Bulletin year	Issue	Topic
1980	Brussels (Belgium)	1981	0	Migration
1982	Brussels (Belgium)	1983	1	Tourism
1984	Paris (France)	1985	2	Regional Problems
1986	Brussels (Belgium)	1987	3	Industry
1988	Brussels (Belgium)	1989	4	Energy & Environment
1990	Brussels (Belgium)	1991	5	Agriculture
1992	Brussels (Belgium)	1993	6	Traffic & Transportation
1994	Brussels (Belgium)	1995	7	Demography & Migration
1996	Salzburg (Austria)	1997	8	Geographical aspects from different countries

=== Twentieth century ===
In 1987 EUROGEO applied for and was accepted as an international NGO with representation at the Council of Europe. Since this time representatives from the association have participated in NGO meetings in Strasbourg, being the voice of geography and geographers there. In 2003 the status of EUROGEO, along with other NGOs, was reviewed and the association became a fully participating NGO at the Council of Europe.

In 1999 a successful application was made by EUROGEO for a European Minerva Project (Euro.Geo) to produce materials that promote European citizenship through the use of ICT in teaching geography in school education. The project was coordinated by Karl Donert at Liverpool Hope University.

At the Liverpool meeting of EUROGEO in 2001, members of the association decided to apply for a project to share news and information about the state and status of Geography in Europe. The project produced a Web site, interactive maps of Europe as well as teaching and training resources in different languages.

Henk Meijer decided to stand down and in 2002 and during the EUROGEO Annual meeting held in Madeira, Portugal at elections for new Presidium Karl Donert was elected President of the association.

=== Twenty-first century: Networking: the HERODOT Network for Geography in higher education and teacher training ===
In 2002, the proposal to establish a Socrates-Erasmus Thematic Network project on university Geography and the Bologna Process funded by the European Commission was successful. This was the HERODOT Network for Geography in Higher Education. This thematic network was coordinated by Liverpool Hope University and led by Karl Donert. HERODOT sought to improve the quality of learning and teaching in higher education and teacher training and address issues raised by the Bologna Process like quality assurance, the use of new technologies and research in geographical education.

There were two phases of the project that ran from 2002 to 2005 and 2006–2009. A large number of publications were produced and many events were held around Europe dealing with issues relating to Geography in higher education and teacher training. Members of EUROGEO participated in the funded network. Under HERODOT, Geography became a subject assessed under the project Tuning Educational Structures in Europe.

By 2009 HERODOT had connected more than 300 organizations throughout all European countries and 60 partners from other countries around the world. These partners joined HERODOT meetings and workshops to share their ideas, innovations and best practice online and face-to-face. The broad partnership of the network included universities and research centres, companies and NGOs as well as teacher training and other education bodies like Ministries of Education. Many of those who participated in the work of HERODOT are still actively collaborating in follow up activities, project and meetings.

The idea to establish a European Geography association that supported not only teachers and educators, but also geographers working in other professions came as a result of the discussions that took place at several Herodot meetings.

At the annual meeting of EUROGEO in Liverpool in September 2008, member associations unanimously agreed to change the legal status and remit of the association. This was presented to HERODOT partners, after which members of the EUROGEO Presidium and the HERODOT Core Group held a joint meeting to form a working group to restructure the association as a membership organisation.

After lengthy discussions both organisations held a joint meeting in Ayvalık, Turkey in June 2009, where the new EUROGEO association held its first elections and passed its revised statutes. Karl Donert was then elected president of EUROGEO. This was the final meeting of the HERODOT network. The new, restructured organisation now deals with educational, scientific, research and applied parts of Geography with a European perspective.

EUROGEO cooperates with many other international institutions and associations including the AAG, SEAGA and the International Geographical Union (IGU) and is a stakeholder organisation in the UNEP, EyeonEarth and "Geo for All" initiatives.

== Membership ==
EUROGEO members are geographers and related professionals who work in the public, private, and academic sectors. They work in a wide range of careers, as teachers and trainers, state and local government employees, planners, cartographers, scientists, non-profit workers, entrepreneurs, business people, graduate students, retirees, and university administrators.

There are three categories of membership:

1. Individual members
2. Organisational members
3. Young members including EGEA (European Association of Young Geographers)

== Publications ==
EUROGEO has published a large number of books, articles, magazines and conference proceedings and the society has developed the European Journal of Geography. The European Journal of Geography published its first issue in 2010 and since then has regularly produced issues and widely cited articles on geographical themes relevant to the activities of the association. In February 2014 the European Journal of Geography was accepted and indexed in Scopus.

EUROGEO is associated with the geography education journal, the Review of International Geographical Education Online, which developed as an initiative from HERODOT members.

== Recent projects ==
EUROGEO regularly applies for new projects, currently under the Erasmus +, Jean Monnet, Citizenship and Horizon 2020 Programmes.

Since 2009, the number of innovative geographical projects EUROGEO has been involved in has increased. Four types of projects have been developed and supported i) networks, ii) multilateral projects iii) awareness raising and iv) support for associations.

EUROGEO has been responsible for the creation of networks of academics and educators on specific priority themes, such as the digitalearth.eu: geomedia in schools network (Lifelong Learning Programme), where a number of Digital Earth Centres of Excellence were accredited, and since 2013, the School on the Cloud network: connecting education to the Cloud for digital citizenship.

EUROGEO has participated in a large number of multi-lateral education development projects. These have established training of teachers and educators in important geographical areas, such as GIS (the iGuess and iGuess 2 Projects), data and statistics in schools (the I-Use Project) and more recently powerful disciplinary knowledge (the GeoCapabilities project).

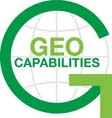
GeoCapabilities project logo

GeoCapabilities is a 3-year project with a key objective to create teacher training materials to develop teachers as curriculum leaders through a capabilities approach. The project embraces diversity in culture and language and in how geography is understood and expressed in national school standards. The project believes that a capabilities approach helps geography educators in all jurisdictions articulate the relevance and power of learning how to think geographically. The key output is "to develop and pilot an online professional development communications platform for teacher preparation in geography." This includes resources (teaching materials and communications tools), international collaboration and online teacher exchanges.

EUROGEO participates in the SeaChange Horizon 2020 Project, raising awareness of the importance of Ocean Literacy. The project aims to establish a fundamental "Sea Change" in the way European citizens view their relationship with the sea, by empowering them, as Ocean Literate citizens, to take direct and sustainable action towards a healthy ocean and seas, healthy communities and ultimately a healthy planet.

EUROGEO has been coordinating since 2016 the YouthMetre Forward Looking Project that addresses EU Youth Priority 7 "Using e-participation as an instrument to foster young people's empowerment and active participation in democratic life". The aim is to empower young people to become engaged and affect EU youth policy. An e-tool will be produced to close the gap between youth and institutions by collecting the perceived needs of youth in key policy areas and providing guidelines to public institutions that help address them. Through training YouthMetre will provide youngsters with necessary skills and knowledge to foster effective implementation by policy makers of the guidelines provided by the "Youthmetre".

In 2013 EUROGEO was awarded a Jean Monnet grant for pan-European associations.

Participation of EUROGEO in EU projects
Title	Years
iGuess – GIS in several subjects	2008–2010
iGuess 2 – Integrating GIS in several subjects	2012–2014
PIRI REIS: Network, Collaboration and Development for Geographers	2011–2013
SPACIT: Education for Spatial Citizenship	2011–2013
I-USE: I Use Statistics in Education	2012–2014
Geo-capabilities: Teachers as curriculum leaders	2013-2016 (Now Geocapabilities 3 until 2020)
GeoSkills Plus	2013–2015
GI Learner: Developing a learning line on GIScience in education	2015–2018
SMILE (Soft Mobility In Learning English in Primary Schools) Erasmus Plus Project	2015–2017
Sea change: Our Ocean, Our Health	2015–2018
YouthMetre: A tool for forward looking youth participation	2016–2017
L-Cloud – Leadership on the Cloud	2018–2019
SEED (Smart Entrepreneurial Education and training in Digital farming Project)	2018–2020
MY-GEO - Geo tools for Modernization and Youth employment	2018–2021
D3 - Developing Digital Data Literacy	2019–2021
GO-DIGITAL - Digital Tools for Work	2019–2021
HUM@N - Digital Transformation in Humanities	2019–2021
TIMELESS - Cultural Interpretation as a Non- Formal and Informal Learning Method In Adult Education	2019–2021
GI-PEDAGOGY - Innovative Pedagogies for Teaching with Geoinformation	2019–2022
SYNOPSIS - Storytelling and Fundraising for Cultural Heritage Professionals	2019–2022
DALDIS - Digital Assessment for Learning informed by Data to Motivate and Incentivise Students	2019–2022
EVALUE - European Values in Education	2019–2022
EAT - Enhancing Equity, Agency, and Transparency in Assessment Practices in Higher Education	2019–2022
BALANCE - Green & Stable - Bringing Sustainability and Environmental Action Together for Better Future	2020–2021
BIO-MAPS - Cartoteca biográfica de autores europeos	2020–2023
ONLIFE - Empower Hibrid Competences for Onlife Adaptable Teaching in School Education in Times of Pandemic	2020–2023
GEOLAND -	2020–2023
SMART VILLAGE - Developing Rural Tourism Businesses	2020–2023
SMILE - Sustainable transport activities and English language learning for pupils	2020–2023
RIDE & SMILE - Ride and Smile	2020–2022
GeoDem - Geography, Democracy and Citizenship in a Digital Age	2021–2022
TOGETHER - Implement service learning in schools TO GET digital cultural HERitage enhanced	2021–2023
MET - My Eco Track	2021–2023
V-GLOBAL - Virtual Field Work in the context of Global Change - a blended learning approach for higher education	2021–2024
FaTa - From Archive to Alive	2021–2023
TTF - Teaching the Future	2022–2024
GIST - GIS for gist of Europe	2022–2024
GEA - Growing into Eco-conscious Adults	2022–2025
TEECHED - Designing a Technology-enhanced Climate Change Education Curriculum	2023–2024
CRISEPAC - Climate change and natural hazards in Europe: Pedagogy for Active Adaptation	2023–2025
STEAME-ACADEMY - Teacher Facilitators Academy	2024–2026
INFRA4NEXT - Providing research infrastructure services to support Next Generation EU	2024–2028
Re3pris - Reduce, Reuse, Recycle in Primary School	2023–2026
GeoDemAI - Geography, Democracy and AI	2024–2025
TCI - Teaching Controversial Issues	2024–2026
GREENGNORANCE - Changing the Perception of Green Issues	2025–2027
V-GeoSciEd - Inclusive V-GeoSciEd : Fostering Diversity and Inclusion in Geography and Science Education through Virtual Field Trips.	2024–2027
EMO-GI - Socio-Emotional Learning on Climate Change Mitigation via Geoinformation and AI	2025–2028
STEAMedge - STEAM empowerment for EDucators through sustainability and the use of emerginG tEchnologies	2026–2029

== Conferences ==
The Association organizes events and activities for members, the most relevant of these is the annual conference and the Annual Meeting.

Annual Conferences
Year	Place	Host Institution	Topic
2007	Stockholm (Sweden)	Stockholm University	Geography for Society: Putting Bologna into Action
2008	Liverpool (United Kingdom)	Liverpool Hope University	Future Prospects in Geography
2009	Ayvalık (Turkey)	Balikesir University	Celebrating Geographical Diversity
2010	Prague (Czech Republic)	Charles University	Sustainable Geographies
2011	Athens (Greece)	Laboratory of Geography of the National Technical University of Athens	Geography: Your world – A European Perspective
2012	Dublin (Ireland)	St. Patrick's University College	Geography and Global Understanding: Connecting the Sciences
2013	Bruges (Belgium)	Ghent University	Geography: Linking Tradition and Future
2014	Valletta (Malta)	University of Malta	The power of Geography and the Role of Spatial Information
2015	Ankara (Turkey)	Turkish Association of Geographers & Gazi University	Communicating Geography: serving our world
2016	Málaga (Spain)	University of Málaga, Real Sociedad Geográfica de España & Asociación de Geógrafos Españoles	Geographic Information: for a better world
2017	Amsterdam (The Netherlands)		Key challenges for geographical education
2018	Cologne (Germany)	University of Cologne	Geography for all 15 – 16 March 2018
2019	Paris (France)		Teaching Geography in challenging times 14 – 16 March 2019
2019	Ljubljana (Slovenia)	University of Ljubljana	Hidden Geographies 29 – 31 August 2019
2020	Madrid (Spain)	Universidad Nacional de Educación a Distancia (UNED)	Sustainable Development Goals for All 23 – 24 April 2020 now moved to 22–23 April 2021, same place & same topic
2022	Mytilene (Greece)	University of AEGEAN	Re-Visioning Geography for Sustainability in the Post-COVID Era 5 – 6 May 2022
2023	Kraków (Poland)	Faculty of Geography and Biology. Pedagogical University of Kraków	Future-Ready Geography 27 – 28 April 2023
2024	Porto (Portugal)	Faculdade de Letras da Universidade do Porto	Compromised Geography: Spreading a New World] 30–31 May 2024
2025	Skopje (Noth Macedonia)	Institute of Geography, Faculty of Natural Sciences and Mathematics- Skopje, Ss. Cyril and Methodius University	Humanising Geography: People, Place and Space in a Global World 16–18 May 2025
2026	Tilburg (Netherlands)	Fontys University	Geographies in Flux: Navigating a Shifting World Order 21–23 May 2026
2027	Budapest (Hungary)	Eötvös Loránd University (ELTE)	Connecting Geography, Innovation, and Society 27–29 May 2027

== Governance ==
EUROGEO is managed by its Presidium, which consists of a President, Secretary General, and Treasurer and up to five Vice Presidents. The Presidium is responsible for the finances and administration of the association and in maintaining the web site of the association and other information sources. Co-opted members may be invited to join the Presidium for specific activities. The current Presidium: Rafael de Miguel González (President), Karl Donert (Past President and vice-president), Luc Zwartjes (Treasurer and vice-president), Maria Luisa de Lázaro Torres (Secretary General and vice-president), Daniela Schmeinck, Aikaterini Klonari, Caroline Leininger-Frézal, Tijana Ilic, Gerry O’Reilly and Gert Rupert (vice-presidents) and Co-opted members: Kostis Koutsopoulos (European Journal of Geography), Harry Rogge, and Michaela Lindner-Fally.

== Some publications ==
- De Miguel González, R. (2021). Geographical and geospatial competences from school education to higher education: the contribution of international journals and EUROGEO in the international projects. J-READING (Journal of Research and Didactics in Geography), 2, 10, 57–65.
- De Miguel Gonzalez, R. (2019). Europe in a global context: EUROGEO and the role of geography and European geographers. European Journal of Geography, 10(4), pp. 160–176. (No. ART-2019-123089). http://eurogeojournal.eu/articles/11_GONZALEZ.pdf
- De Miguel González, R. (2011) "I Congreso Europeo de Didáctica de la Geografía", Didáctica Geográfica 13: pp. 151–154.
- De Miguel González, R. and Donert, K. (2022) Geography and international education. A Geographical Century: Essays for the Centenary of the International Geographical Union. Springer, pp. 135–154.
- Donert, K. (2003, April). HERODOT: a thematic network for geography departments in higher education. In Geography and Citizenship Education: Research Perspectives: Proceedings of the London Conference.
- Donert K (2005) Changing horizons in geography education. Herodot Network.
- Donert, K. (Ed.) (2005), Higher Education GIS in Geography: A European Perspective (Liverpool: Liverpool Hope University; HERODOT Network.
- Donert, K., Charzyński, P., & Podgórski, Z. (Eds.). (2007). Teaching geography in and about Europe. Herodot Network.
- Donert, K., Charzyński, P., & Podgórski, Z. (Eds.). (2008). Bilingual geography: aims, methods and challenges. Herodot Network.
- Donert, K. (2009). Thematic network projects in European higher education: An analysis of agents of change. Higher Education in Europe, 34(1), pp. 105–111.
- Donert K (2013), digital-earth.eu – a European network for Digital Earth education, SPIE Journal.
- Donert K (2014), Building Capacity for Digital Earth education in Europe, pp. 11–38, In De Miguel. R., & Donert, K. (Eds.), (2014). Learning Geography in Europe: new challenges for the 21st Century. Newcastle: Cambridge
- HERODOT Network (2009). The benchmarking statements for GIS in geography education. Learning with Geoinformation IV. Heidelberg, Wichmann, 235–240.
- Higgitt, D., Donert, K., Healey, M., Klein, P., Solem, M., & Vajoczki, S. (2008). Developing and enhancing international collaborative learning. Journal of Geography in Higher Education, 32(1), pp. 121–133.
- Jekel T and Koller A (2008) Learning with Geoinformation III: result of the Conference' Learning with Geoinformation', held within the framework of AGIT and organised in co-operation with the HERODOT network and the GI-Forum on July 2–4, 2008 in Salzburg. Berlin, WichmannVerlag.
- Schulze, U., Kanwischer, D., & Reudenbach, C. (2011). Competence dimensions in a Bologna-oriented GIS education. Learning with GI, pp. 108–117.
- Solem, M., Chalmers, L., Dibiase, D., Donert, K., & Hardwick, S. (2006). Internationalizing professional development in geography through distance education. Journal of Geography in Higher Education, 30(1), pp. 147–160.
- Wall G (2004), HERODOT Thematic Network and the Tuning of Geography, Planet, 12, http://www.gees.ac.uk/planet/p12/gw.pdf
