= Paris School of Urban Planning =

Urban planning school in Paris, France

- École d'urbanisme de Paris
- Type: A school of university
- Established: 2015
- Affiliations: UPEC; UPEM; University of Paris-Est
- Administrative staff: 50
- Students: 500
- Location: Champs-sur-Marne, France
- Campus: Campus Descartes
- Website: www.eup.fr

The Paris School of Urban Planning (French: École d'urbanisme de Paris (EUP)) is a higher education and research institute, dependent of both the University of Marne-la-Vallée and the Paris 12 Val de Marne University.

== Education ==
=== Programs ===
==== Master 1 ====
- Urbanism and Urban Planning

==== Masters 2 ====
The EUP offers 8 programs:

- Transportation and Mobility (in collaboration with École des Ponts ParisTech)
- Urban alternatives and experimental projects
- Development and territories: resources, policies and strategies
- Urban Planning and international expertise (European cities course: taught in English, Cities of the south course: taught in French)
- Programming and Management of Urban Projects
- Urban Environments: strategies, projects and services
- Housing and Urban Renewal
- Urban Development : projects and strategies
