= Saudi Geographical Society =

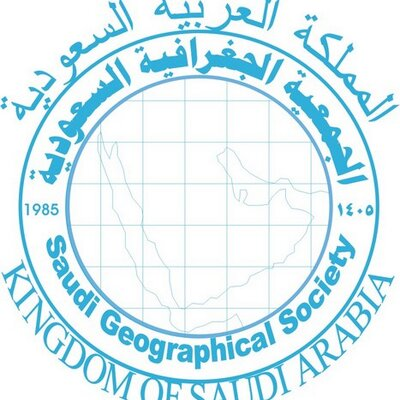
Logo of the Saudi Geographical Society

The Saudi Geographical Society (Arabic: الجمعية الجغرافية السعودية, Aj-jam'aiya Aj-joġrafïya as-Saʻūdiyya), a learned society headquartered in King Saud University, Riyadh in the Kingdom of Saudi Arabia, is a non-for-profit organization for workers and experts in geography. Its recently elected chairman is Prof. Mohammad Sh. Makki.

By 2005, 251 members were involved in the Society within 5 Research Groups.

== History ==
The society was established 1971, and the first meeting for the General Congress took place on 22 December 1984. It was ratified by the Higher Education Council in Saudi Arabia under the category of research societies operating in national universities. Previously, many geographic associations were working within the Saudi universities. These associations merged to become the recent Society that joined the International Geographical Union.

== Mission ==
SGS is mainly working to encourage research and scientific consultations within geographical aspects related to the area of Arabian Peninsula and Saudi Arabia, in particular and to publish research and results. It is also dedicated to writing and translating references and publications to Arabic.

== Publications ==
The Society publishes a bilingual (Arabic and English) biennial refereed and scientific Journal called "The Arabian Journal of Geographical Information Systems" OCLC 213982845 An annual bulletin is also published by the Society as The Newsletter of Saudi Geographical Society focusing more on internal issues and news about new publications, meetings and activities managed by the Society and its partners.

SGS is also printing professional high-quality maps and managing a database of geographical information on its server.
