= 2008 Hong Kong legislative election in Kowloon West =

- 7 September 2008

All 5 Kowloon West seats to the Legislative Council
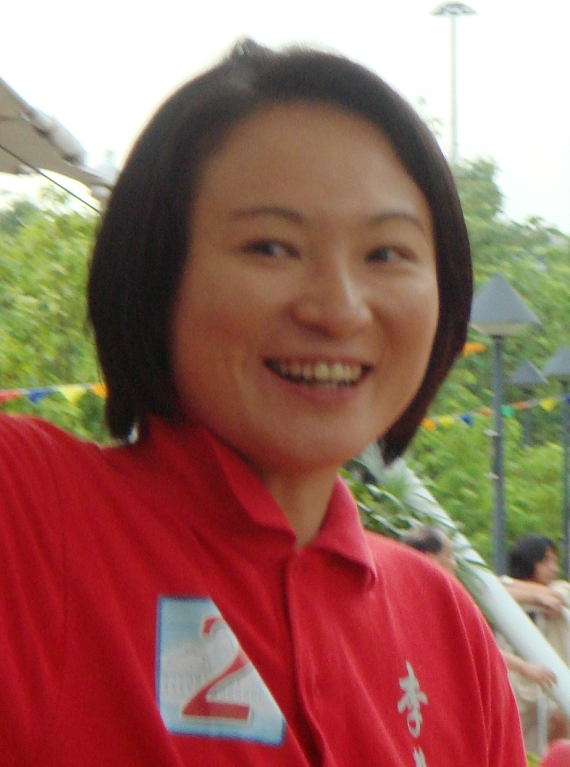

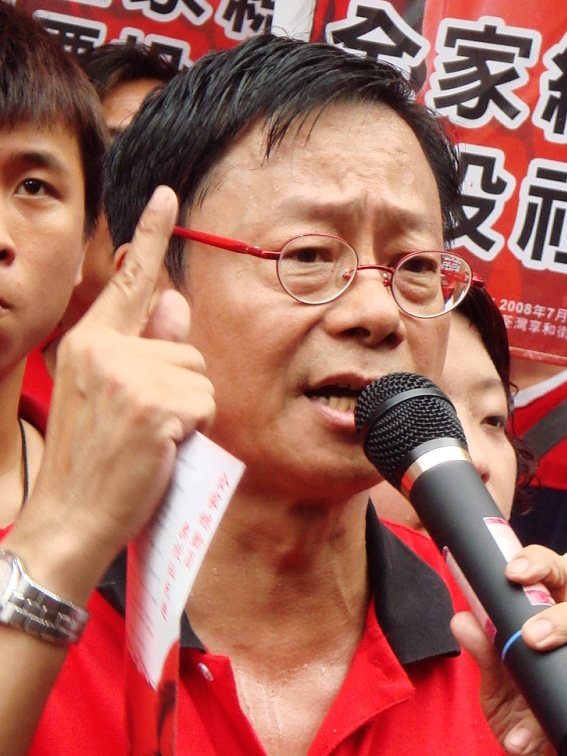

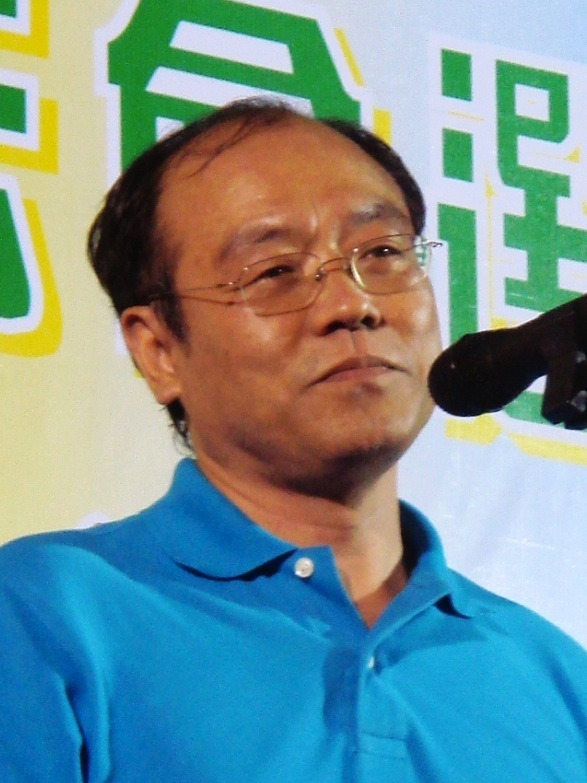

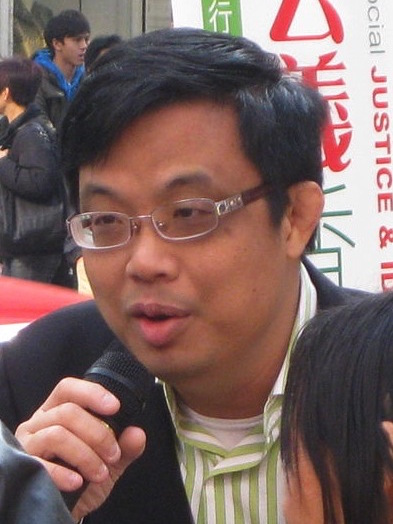

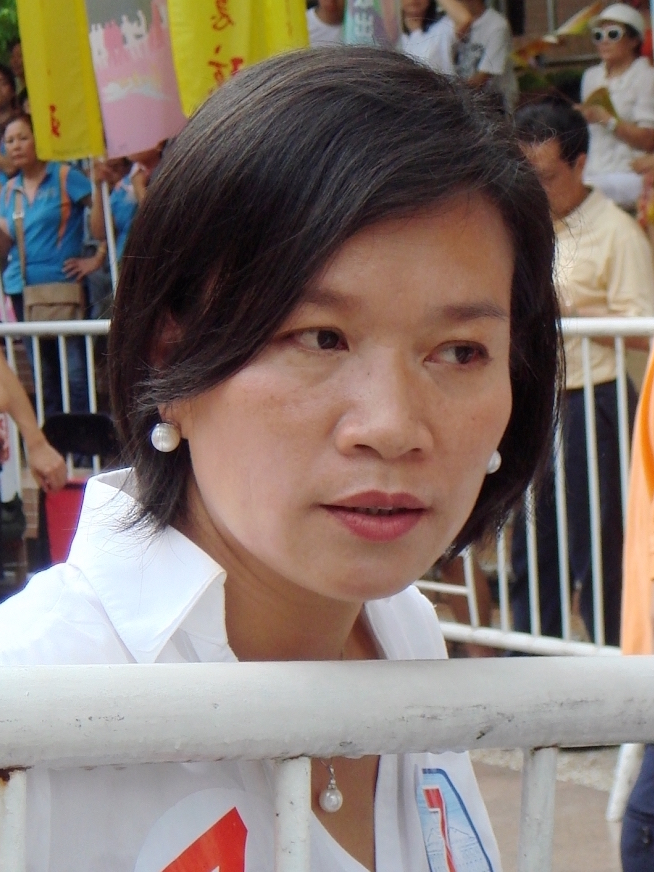

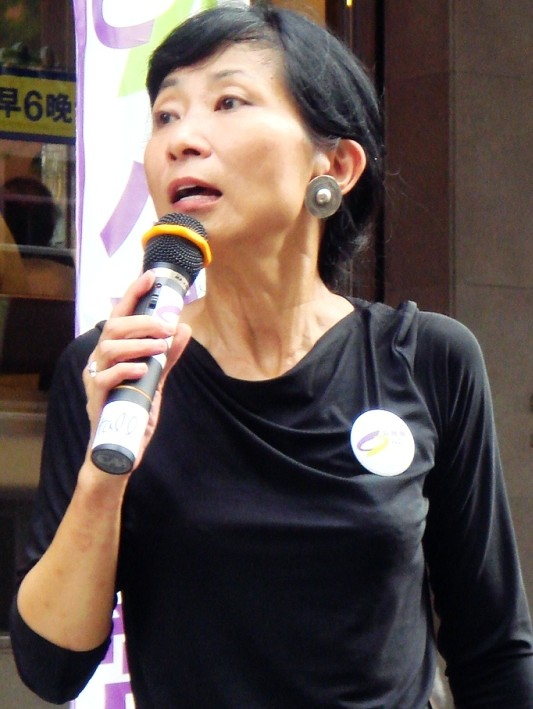
	First party	Second party	Third party
Leader	Starry Lee	Wong Yuk-man	Frederick Fung
Party	DAB	LSD	ADPL
Alliance	Pro-Beijing	Pan-democracy	Pan-democracy
Last election	1 seat, 18.9%	New party	1 seat, 26.4%
Seats before	1	0	1
Seats won	1	1	1
Seat change	Steady	▲1	Steady
Popular vote	39,013	37,553	35,440
Percentage	18.9%	18.2%	17.2%
Swing	▼8.2%	N/A	▼3.3%
	Fourth party	Fifth party	Sixth party
Leader	James To	Priscilla Leung	Claudia Mo
Party	Democratic	Independent	Civic
Alliance	Pan-democracy	Pro-Beijing	Pan-democracy
Last election	1 seat, 26.6%	No seat	New party
Seats before	1	0	0
Seats won	1	1	0
Seat change	Steady	▲1	Steady
Popular vote	29,690	19,914	17,259
Percentage	14.4%	9.6%	8.4%
Swing	▼12.2%	N/A	N/A
- Party with most votes in each District Council Constituency.

These are the Kowloon West results of the 2008 Hong Kong legislative election. The election was held on 7 September 2008 and all 5 seats in Kowloon West where consisted of Yau Tsim Mong District, Sham Shui Po District and Kowloon City District were contested. Starry Lee replaced Jasper Tsang who contested the Hong Kong Island stood for the largest pro-Beijing party Democratic Alliance for the Betterment and Progress of Hong Kong. Wong Yuk-man of the newly established League of Social Democrats became the pan-democrat who received the most votes. Pro-Beijing independent, Priscilla Leung also won the last seat, beating Civic Party's Claudia Mo.

== Overall results ==
Before election:

↓
3	1
Pan-democracy	Pro-Beijing

Change in composition:

↓
3	2
Pan-democracy	Pro-Beijing

Party	Seats	Seats change	Contesting list(s)	Votes	%	% change
LSD	1	0	1	37,553	18.2	N/A
ADPL	1	0	1	35,440	17.2	−3.3
Democratic	1	0	1	29,690	14.4	–12.2
Civic	0	0	1	17,259	8.4	N/A
SDA	0	0	1	591	0.3	N/A
Independent	0	0	3	12,446	6.0	N/A
Pro-democracy camp	3	0	8	132,979	64.4	–7.7
DAB	1	0	1	39,013	18.9	–8.2
Liberal	1	0	1	13,011	6.3	N/A
Independent	1	0	2	20.990	10.2	N/A
Pro-Beijing camp	2	0	4	73,014	35.3	+8.2
Independent or others	0	0	1	590	0.3	N/A
Turnout:				206,583	47.2	

== Candidates list ==
Legislative Election 2008: Kowloon West
List	Candidates	Votes	Of total (%)	± from prev.
DAB	Starry Lee Wai-king Chung Kong-mo, Chan Wai-ming, Vincent Cheng Wing-shun	39,013	18.9	−8.2
LSD	Wong Yuk-man Lee Wai-yee	37,553	18.2	N/A
ADPL	Frederick Fung Kin-kee Rosanda Mok Ka-han, Tsung Po-shan, Wong Chi Yung, Yeung Chun-yu	35,440	17.2	−3.3
Democratic	James To Kun-sun Lam Ho-yeung	29,690	14.4	−12.2
Nonpartisan	Priscilla Leung Mei-fun Edward Leung Wai-keun, Aaron Lam Ka-fai	19,914	9.6	N/A
Civic	Claudia Mo Man-ching, Ng Yuet-lan, Tang Chi-ying	17,259	8.4	N/A
Liberal	Michael Tien Puk-sun, Ho Hin-ming	13,011	6.3	N/A
Nonpartisan	Lau Chin-shek	10,553	5.1	N/A
Independent	Tam Hoi-pong	1,603	0.8	N/A
Nonpartisan	Francis Chong Wing-charn	1,076	0.5	N/A
SDA	James Lung Wai-man, Bantawa Sukra	591	0.3	N/A
Nonpartisan	Lam Yi-lai	590	0.3	N/A
Nonpartisan	Lau Yuk-shing, Nandeed Cheung Kit-fung, David Tsui	290	0.1	N/A
Total valid votes		206,583	100.00	
Rejected ballots		1,182		
Turnout		207,765	47.18	−7.56
Registered electors		440,335		

== See also ==
- Legislative Council of Hong Kong
- Hong Kong legislative elections
- 2008 Hong Kong legislative election
