= Roy Tam =

Hong Kong politician, environmental activist

- 譚凱邦
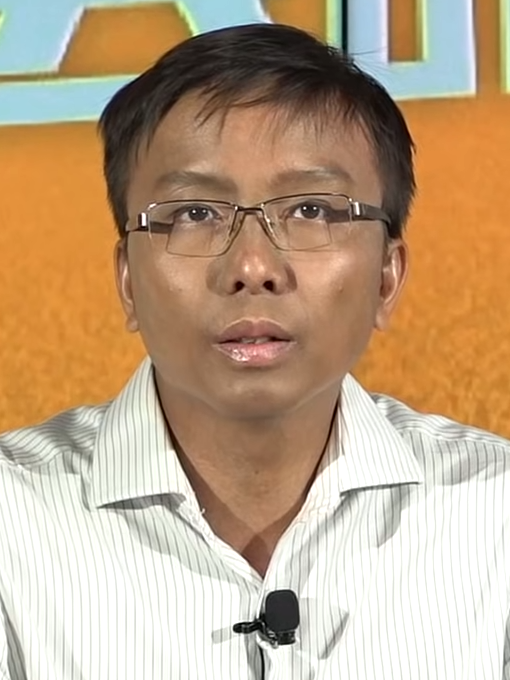
- Tam in 2020

Tsuen Wan District Councillor
- In office 1 January 2016 – 19 April 2021
- Preceded by: Constituency created
- Constituency: Ma Wan

Personal details
- Born: 17 May 1980 (age 46)
- Party: Neo Democrats (until 2021)
- Education: Chinese University of Hong Kong (BSc)
- Website: Roy Tam on Facebook

Roy Tam Hoi-pong (Chinese: 譚凱邦; born 17 May 1980) is a Hong Kong activist and politician. Known for advocating environmental activism and localism and as a former member of the Tsuen Wan District Council, Tam was charged with in 2021 with subversion in Hong Kong 47 case.

== Early career ==
After graduating from CNEC Christian College and from Chinese University of Hong Kong with Bachelor of Science in Environmental Science, Tam first worked as a teacher in multiple schools, teaching biology, science, and computer science. Notable students include Tommy Cheung, former spokesman of student activist group Scholarism.

== Environmental activism ==
Dedicated in promoting environmental awareness, Tam co-founded and was the inaugural editor-in-chief of Green Post, a campus media on environmental protection. He also founded two local environmental groups, Footprint and Green Sense, in 2002 and 2004 respectively.

Tam, as the President of Green Sense, was well known for several clashes with government on urban planning, including housing development over wetlands, airport expansion, and reclamation. He was often interviewed on green issues, such as walled buildings, energy saving. In 2009 the group advocated 50-cent charge for disposable utensils after McDonald's Skip the Straw Day programme.

However, Tam's environmental views was sometimes criticised as radical, such as recommending no escalators in metro stations and calling for boycotting World Wildlife Fund, and was branded by pundit Choy Chi-keung as "environmentalism Taliban" after Tam urged to cancel television programme Hole in the Wall for wasting Styrofoam, and by others for his objection to Ice Bucket Challenge.

== Political career ==
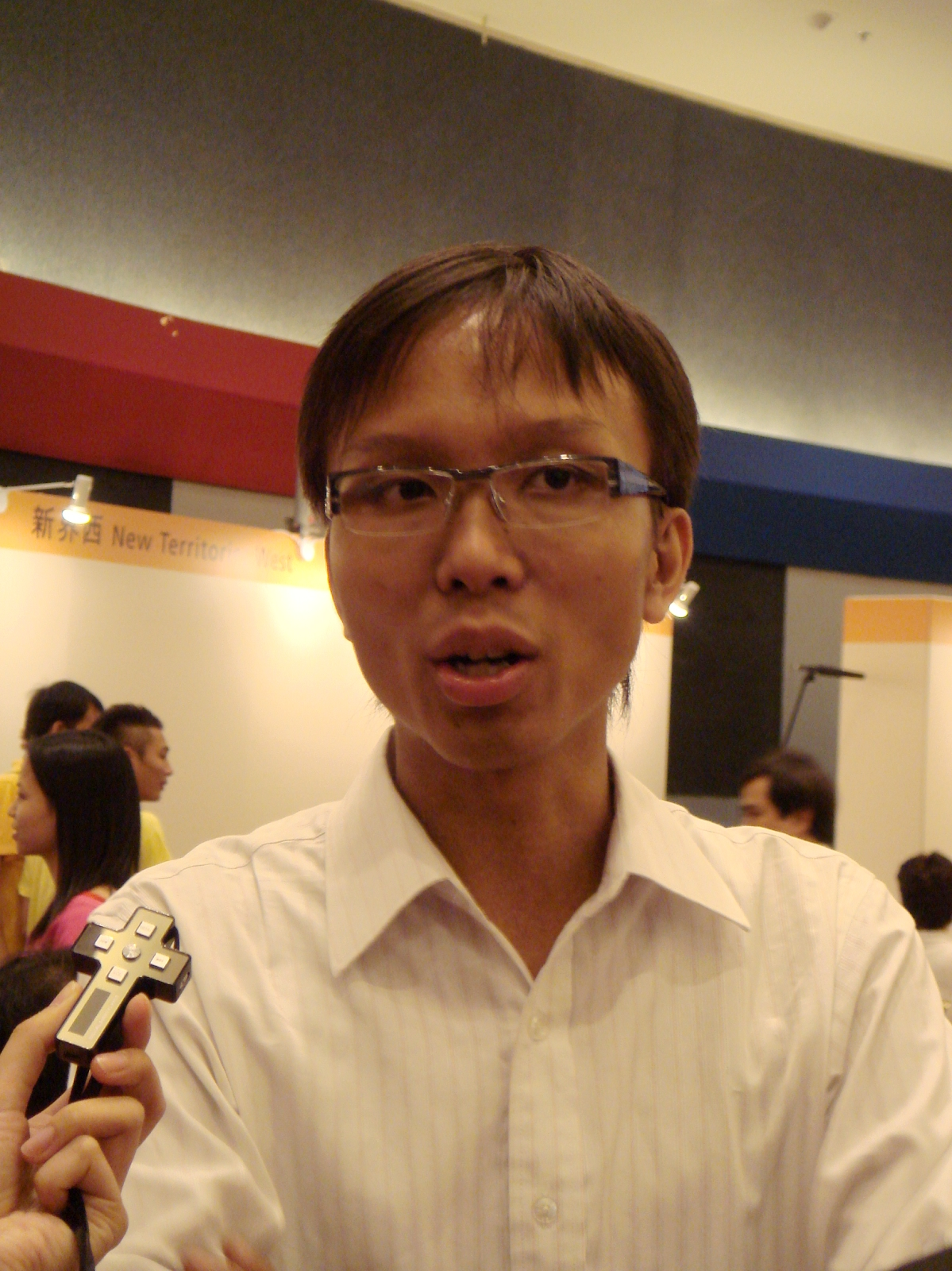
Tam in 2008

Tam ran in the 2008 legislative election in Kowloon West constituency under the slogan "vote for a green Hong Kong". He supported universal suffrage for both Chief Executive and Legislative Council elections, but claimed to be neither a democrat nor a conservative. Despite supported by Civic Party and Democratic Party's New Territories East branch chairman, he was defeated by a large margin.

Tam announced his intention to join the 2012 election, but abandoned his election plan citing illness.

A localism supporter to reduce quota of Chinese One-way Permit, Tam in 2013, along with various pro-democracy legislator and activists, initiated the anti-assimilation, anti-communization, anti-Leung movement, urging a stop to Chinese interference in Hong Kong and the resignation of Leung Chun-ying as Chief Executive. Tam also called on Taiwan to alert growing Chinese influence. Tam is also a supporter for Taiwan independence to preserve democratic institutions and defend local culture after he described Hong Kong's One Country, Two Systems as a failure. He further protested against the influx of Chinese migrants which overburdened Hong Kong's medical system.

After being elected to the Tsuen Wan District Council in the new Ma Wan constituency in 2015, Tam again intended to run in the 2016 legislative election for the pro-democracy Neo Democrats, but withdrew to take care of his ill wife.

In 2019 amidst the large scale protest, Tam was re-elected in the District Council election in a landslide victory. Neo Democrats put Tam's name forward in the 2020 pro-democracy primaries, but was defeated with the fewest votes amongst the candidates.

Tam was arrested in February 2021 for "subversion of state power" for running in the primaries and detained since then after bail denied by court. The case of which would be known as "Hong Kong 47". He quit Neo Democrats and resigned from the District Council on 20 April 2021. He remanded in custody after the judge considered he "persistently reiterated his stance against the Hong Kong government".

== Electoral performances ==
=== 2008 legislative election ===
2008 Legislative Council election: Kowloon West
| List | Candidates | Votes | Of total (%) | ± from prev. |
|---|---|---|---|---|
| Quota | | 41,317 | 20.00 | |
| DAB | Starry Lee Wai-king Chung Kong-mo, Chan Wai-ming, Vincent Cheng Wing-shun | 39,013 | 18.88 | −8.25 |
| LSD | Wong Yuk-man Lee Wai-yee | 37,553 | 18.18 | N/A |
| ADPL | Frederick Fung Kin-kee Rosanda Mok Ka-han, Tsung Po-shan, Wong Chi Yung, Yeung Chun-yu | 35,440 | 17.16 | −2.89 |
| Democratic | James To Kun-sun Lam Ho-yeung | 29,690 | 14.37 | −12.22 |
| Nonpartisan | Priscilla Leung Mei-fun Edward Leung Wai-keun, Aaron Lam Ka-fai | 19,914 | 9.64 | N/A |
| Civic | Claudia Mo Man-ching, Ng Yuet-lan, Tang Chi-ying | 17,259 | 8.35 | N/A |
| Liberal | Michael Tien Puk-sun, Ho Hin-ming | 13,011 | 6.30 | N/A |
| Nonpartisan | Lau Chin-shek | 10,553 | 5.11 | N/A |
| Independent | Tam Hoi-pong | 1,603 | 0.78 | N/A |
| Nonpartisan | Francis Chong Wing-charn | 1,076 | 0.52 | N/A |
| SDA | James Lung Wai-man, Bantawa Sukra | 591 | 0.29 | N/A |
| Nonpartisan | Lam Yi-lai | 590 | 0.29 | N/A |
| Nonpartisan | Lau Yuk-shing, Nandeed Cheung Kit-fung, David Tsui | 290 | 0.14 | N/A |
| Total valid votes | | 206,583 | 100.00 | |
| Rejected ballots | | 1,182 | | |
| Turnout | | 207,765 | 47.18 | −7.56 |
| Registered electors | | 440,335 | | |

=== 2015 local elections ===
Tsuen Wan District Council Election, 2015: Ma Wan
| Party | Candidate | Votes | % | ±% |
|---|---|---|---|---|
| Neo Democrats | Roy Tam Hoi-pong | 1,668 | 48.4 | |
| NPP | Kevin Wong Chiu-wah | 1,056 | 30.6 | |
| Nonpartisan | Justin Tseng Wen-tien | 529 | 15.4 | |
| Third Side | William Luk Wai-leung | 193 | 5.6 | |
| Majority | | 612 | 17.8 | |
| Turnout | | 3,469 | 61.3 | |
| Neo Democrats win (new seat) | | | | |

=== 2019 local elections ===
Tsuen Wan District Council Election, 2019: Ma Wan
| Party | Candidate | Votes | % | ±% |
|---|---|---|---|---|
| Neo Democrats | Roy Tam Hoi-pong | 3,538 | 69.09 | |
| Independent | Wong Chun-yeung | 1,493 | 29.15 | |
| Nonpartisan | Lun Chi-wai | 90 | 1.76 | |
| Majority | | 2,045 | 31.94 | |
| Turnout | | 5,174 | 74.13 | |
| Neo Democrats hold | | Swing | | |
