= Long (Chinese surname) =

Chinese family name

龍
- Stroke order of the Chinese surname Long (龍)
- Romanization: Mandarin: Long, Lung; Cantonese: Lung
- Pronunciation: Mandarin: [ˈlʊ̌ŋ]

Origin
- Meaning: Dragon

Long is the pinyin romanization of a few Chinese surnames. It includes 龍 / 龙, which means "dragon" in Chinese, ranking number 80 on the list of common Chinese surnames in 2006, up from 108 in 1990. Another name transcribed as Long is 隆, which is very rare in contemporary China. In Hong Kong, these names are romanized as Lung. In Wade-Giles it is also romanized as Lung.

== Notable people ==
- Long Ju (simplified Chinese: 龙且; traditional Chinese: 龍且), military general who served Xiang Yu during the Chu–Han Contention (died 203 BC)
- Long Qingquan (龙清泉; 龍清泉), Chinese weightlifter
- Long Yan, (龙艳; 龍艷; born 1973) Chinese former synchronized swimmer who competed in the 1996 Summer Olympics
- Long Yun (龙云; 龍雲; 1884–1962), governor and warlord of the Chinese province of Yunnan
- James Lung Wai-man (龍緯汶), chairman of the Southern Democratic Alliance in Hong Kong
- Lung Ying-tai (龍應台; born 1952), Taiwanese essayist and cultural critic
- Long Lehao (龙乐豪; born 1938), Chinese aerospace engineer and scientist; fellow of the Chinese Academy of Engineering
- Manyuan Long (龙漫远; 龍漫遠; Lóng Mànyuǎn), Chinese American biologist
- Ming Long, Australian businesswoman, former chair of Diversity Council Australia
- Long Yiming (龙以明; born 1948), Chinese mathematician, professor at Nankai University, fellow of the Chinese Academy of Sciences
- Anders Ljungstedt (龙思泰; 龍思泰; Lóng Sītài; 1759–1835), Swedish merchant and historian
- Long Daoyi (龙道一; born 2003), Chinese diver
- Kasing Lung (龍家昇; born 1972), Hong Kong illustrator and toy designer; best known for creating Labubu
