= Sham Shui Po District =

Sham Shui Po 深水埗區
- District
- Sham Shui Po District
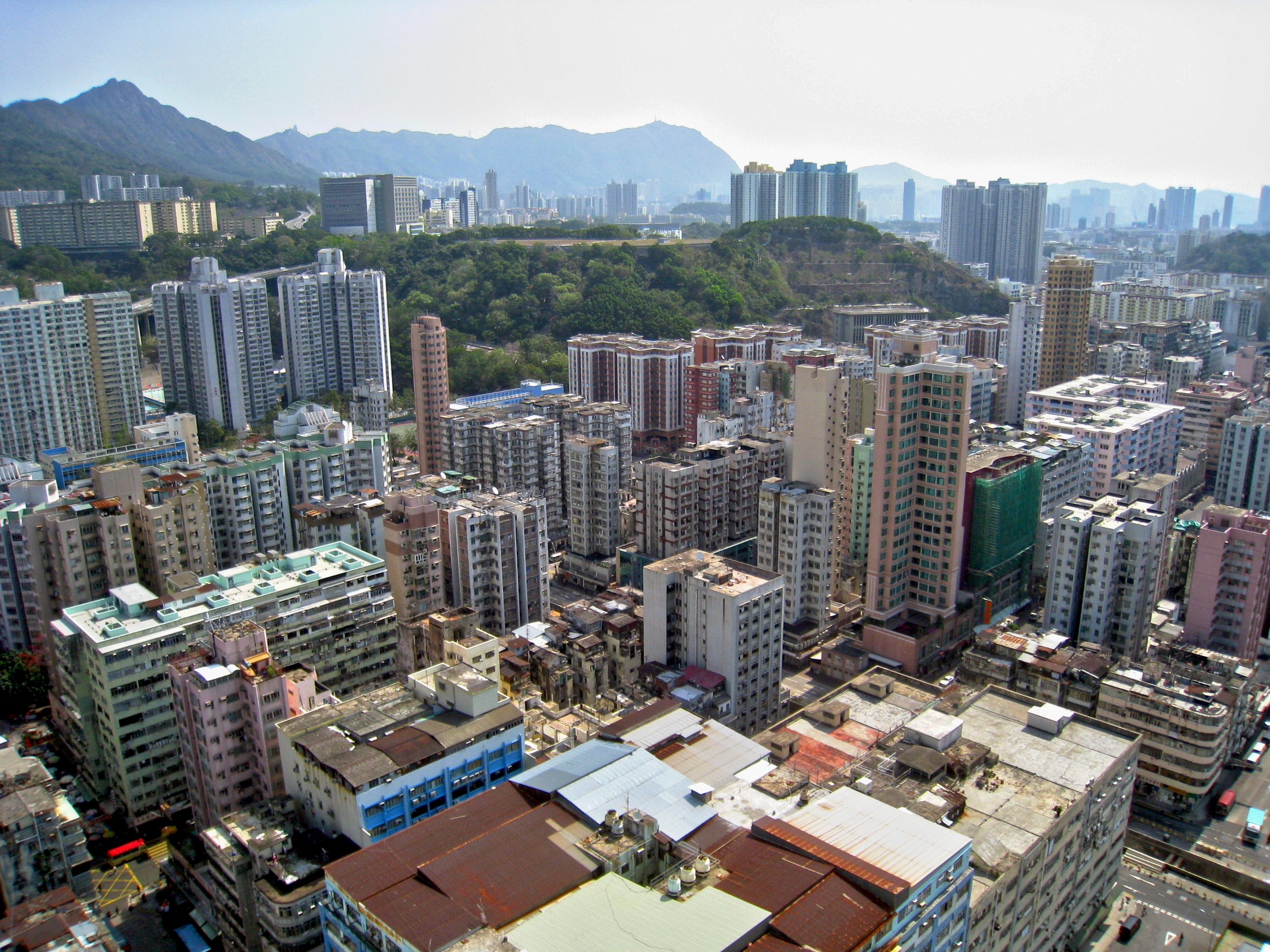
- Day view of the Sham Shui Po District skyline

- Location of Sham Shui Po within Hong Kong
- Coordinates: 22°19′51″N 114°09′44″E
- Statutorily-defined area: Kowloon (Stonecutters' Island), New Kowloon (mainland)
- Region: Hong Kong (special administrative region)
- Country: China
- Constituencies: 21

Government
  - District Council chairman: Chum Tak Shing (ADPL)
  - District Council Vice-chairwoman: Janet Ng
  - District Officer: Damian Kwok-hung Lee

Area
  - Total: 9.48 km^{2} (3.66 sq mi)

Population (2016)
  - Total: 405,869
  - Density: 42,800/km^{2} (111,000/sq mi)
- Time zone: UTC+8 (Hong Kong Time)
- Largest neighbourhood by population: Sham Shui Po (60,161 – 2016 est)
- Location of district office and district council: 303 Cheung Sha Wan Road, Sham Shui Po

Sham Shui Po District
- Traditional Chinese: 深水埗區
- Simplified Chinese: 深水埗区
- Cantonese Yale: Sāmséuibóu kēui
Transcriptions
Standard Mandarin
- Hanyu Pinyin: Shēnshuǐbù qū
Wu
- Wugniu: sen^{1} sy^{3} bu^{6} chiu^{1}
- IPA: Shanghainese: [sən˥ sɿ˧ bu˨ tɕʰy˩]
Yue: Cantonese
- Yale Romanization: Sāmséuibóu kēui
- Jyutping: sam^{1} seoi^{2} bou^{2} keoi^{1}
- IPA: [sɐm˥.sɵɥ˧˥.pɔw˧˥ kʰɵɥ˥]

Sham Shui Po District is one of 18 districts of Hong Kong. It is the second poorest district by income in Hong Kong, with a predominantly working-class population of 405,869 in 2016 and the lowest median household income of all districts. Sham Shui Po has long been home to poorer new immigrants from Mainland China. It also saw the birth of public housing in Hong Kong, as the government sought to resettle those displaced by a devastating fire in its slums. Sham Shui Po also hosted a Vietnamese refugee camp during the influx of migration in the aftermath of the Vietnam War in the 1970s.

The district covers the Shek Kip Mei, Sham Shui Po, Cheung Sha Wan, Lai Chi Kok, Kowloon Tsai, So Uk, Un Chau, Tai Wo Ping and Yau Yat Chuen areas of New Kowloon, and Stonecutters Island of Kowloon.

== Administration ==
Sham Shui Po District administers:

- Cheung Sha Wan – Between Tonkin Street and Kom Tsun Street / Butterfly Valley Road.
- Western Part of Kowloon Tong – West of the route of East Rail line, north of Boundary Street and east of Tai Hang Tung Road
- Sham Shui Po – Between Tonkin Street and Boundary Street
- Shek Kip Mei – East of Tai Po Road, North of Boundary Street, west of Tai Hang Tung Road.
- So Uk – Between Po On Road and Ching Cheung Road / Tai Po Road.
- Stonecutters Island – Excluding the reclaimed lands for Container Terminal 8 which is located in north of Hing Wah Street West and Ngong Shuen Chau Viaduct.

== Demographics and housing ==
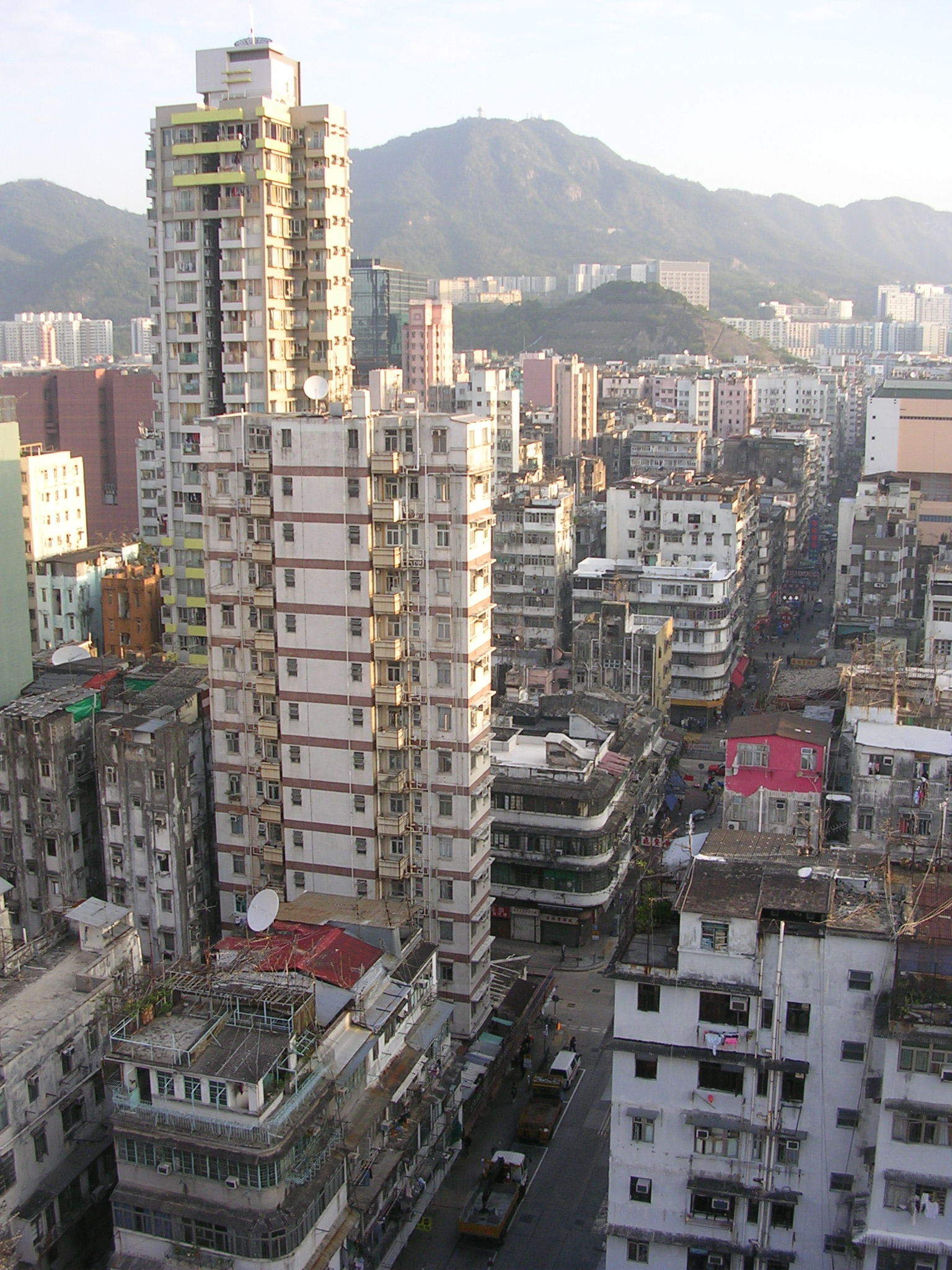
Buildings in Sham Shui Po

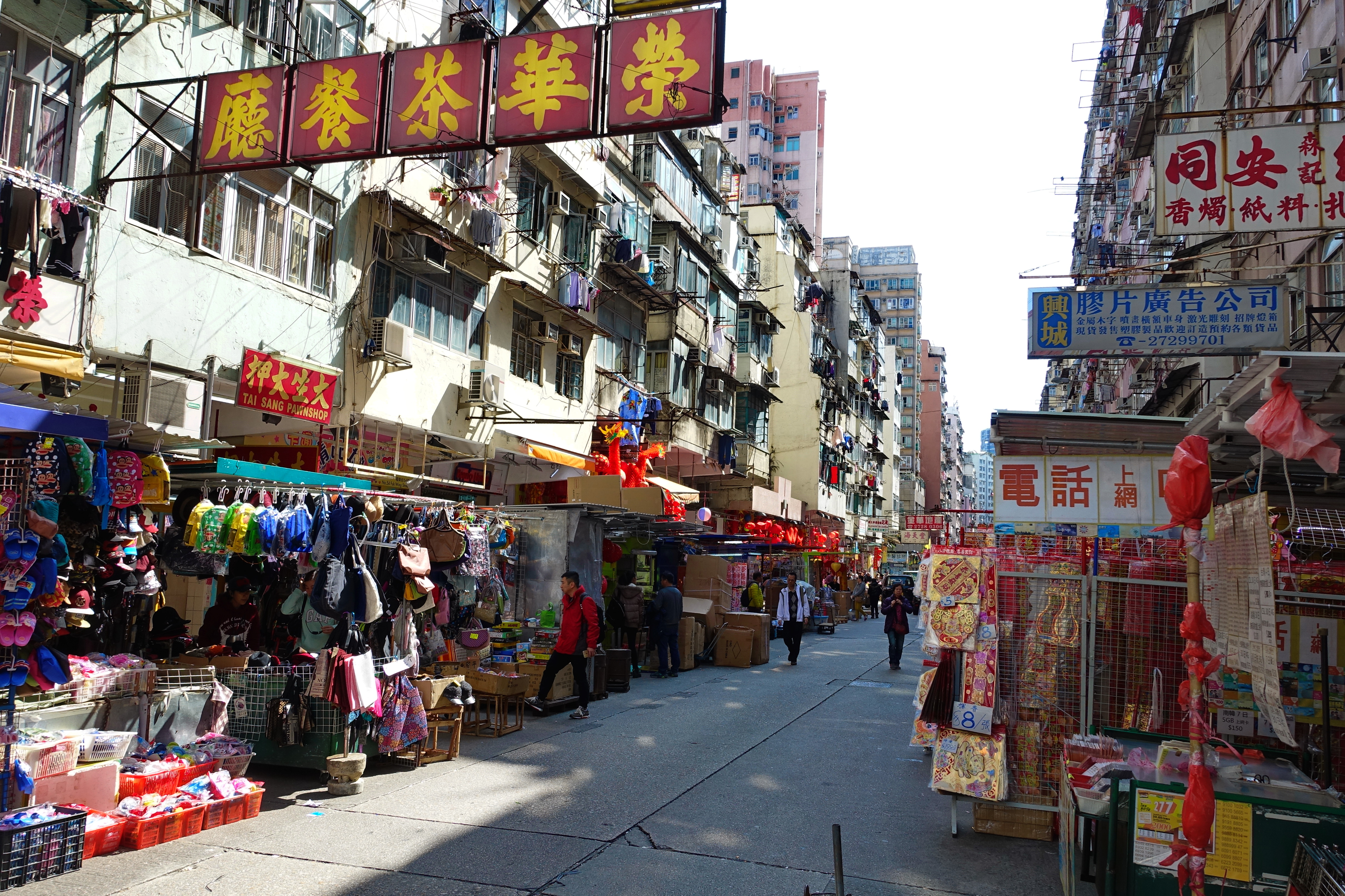
Fuk Wing Street, looking south east from Pei Ho Street

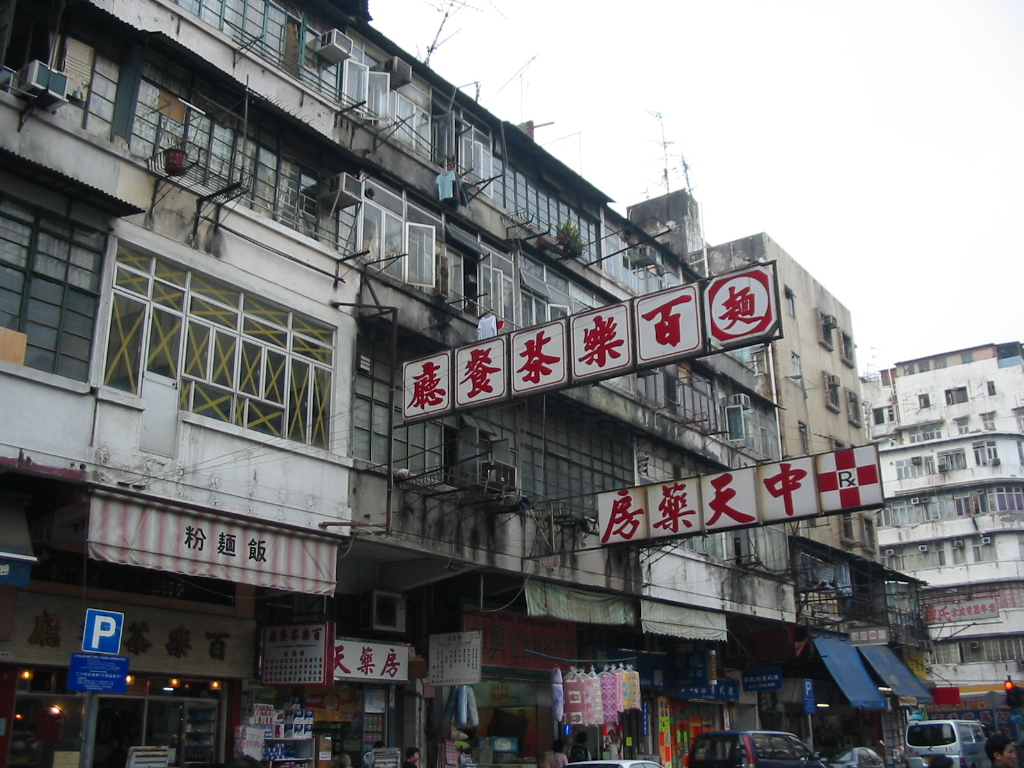
Kweilin Street, Sham Shui Po

Sham Shui Po was already a densely populated district in the 1950s and 1960s. It is poverty-stricken, having the lowest median monthly domestic household income among the 18 districts. It has the highest percentage of elderly people over 65 years. The percentage of new immigrants is also very high. Living conditions of grass-roots families in this district remain a social issue.

Mei Foo Sun Chuen in Lai Chi Kok, built in 1968–1978, was Hong Kong's first large-scale private housing estate. It comprises eight phases with a total of 99 blocks.

=== Public Housing ===
There are 18 public housing estates in the Sham Shui Po District, divided into sub-districts:

- Cheung Sha Wan
  - Cheung Sha Wan Estate
  - Fortune Estate
  - Hoi Lai Estate
  - Hoi Tat Estate
  - Hoi Ying Estate
  - Lai Tsui Court
  - Lei Cheng Uk Estate
  - So Uk Estate
  - Un Chau Estate
- Sham Shui Po
  - Cronin Garden
  - Fu Cheong Estate
  - Lai Kok Estate
  - Lai On Estate
  - Nam Cheong Estate
  - Wing Cheong Estate
- Shek Kip Mei
  - Chak On Estate
  - Nam Shan Estate
  - Pak Tin Estate
  - Shek Kip Mei Estate
  - Tai Hang Tung Estate
  - Tai Hang Sai Estate

== Education ==
The main campus of City University of Hong Kong, was located in Tat Chee Avenue, Sham Shui Po District.

Hong Kong Public Libraries has five libraries in the district: Lai Chi Kok, Po On Road, Sham Shui Po, Shek Kip Mei, and Un Chau Street.

== Transport ==
There are four railway lines serving Sham Shui Po District:

=== MTR ===
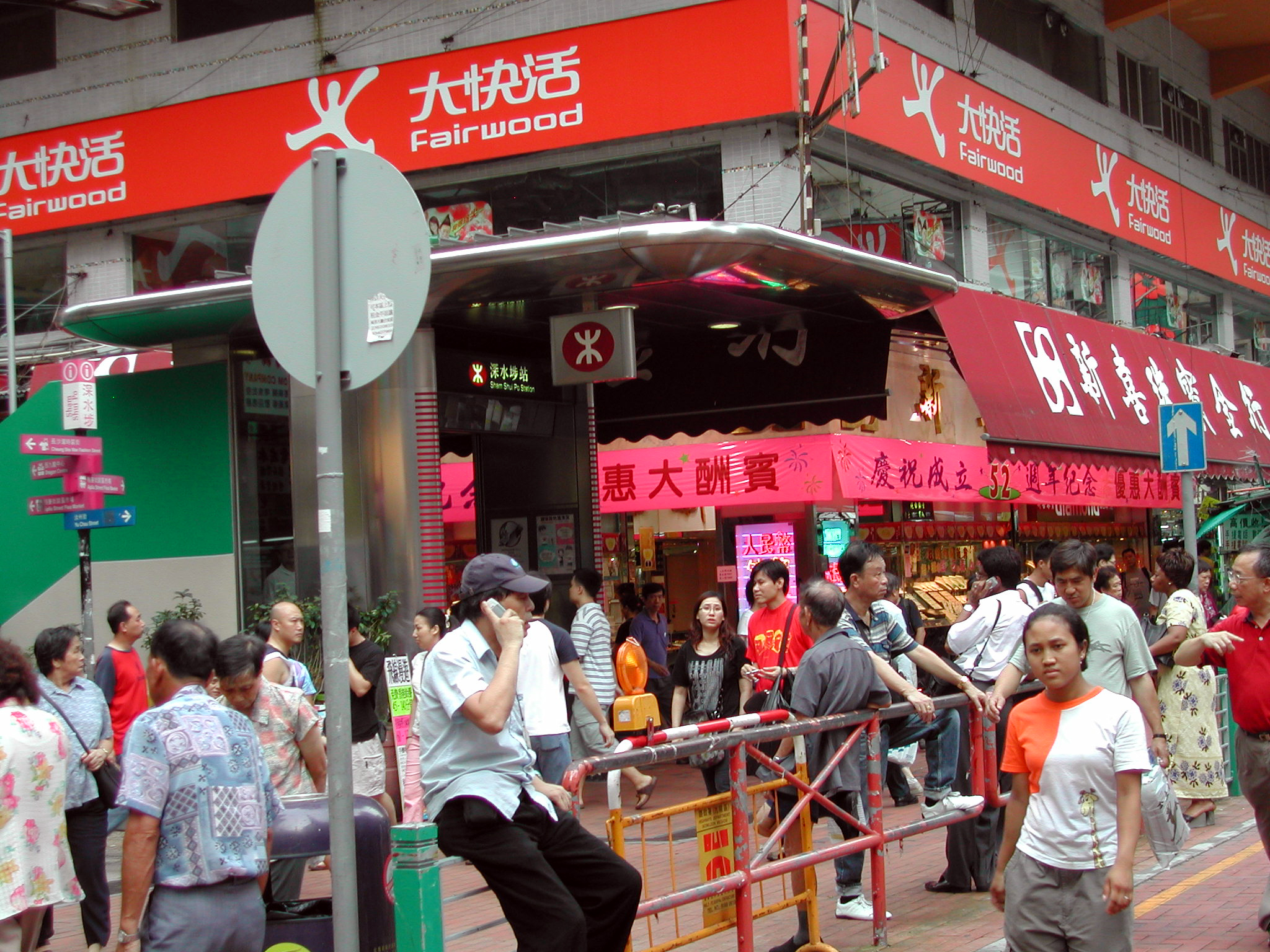
People outside Sham Shui Po MTR station.

- Kwun Tong line: Shek Kip Mei
- Tsuen Wan line: Sham Shui Po, Cheung Sha Wan, Lai Chi Kok, Mei Foo.
- Tung Chung line: Nam Cheong.
- Tuen Ma line: Mei Foo, Nam Cheong.

=== Buses ===
There are also various bus routes serving the district. Most of them are operated by Kowloon Motor Bus, and some by Citybus. These two companies also jointly operate some routes, most of these crossing the harbour to the Hong Kong Island.

- Kowloon Motor Bus: 1, 1A, 2, 2A, 2B, 2D, 2E, 2F, 2X, 6, 6C, 6D, 6F, 6P, 6X, 12, 12A, 12P, 13P, 18, 30, 30X, 31B, 32, 33, 33A, 33B, 35A, 35X, 36A, 36B, 36X, 37, 38, 38A, 38P, 40, 40A, 40P, 42, 42A, 42C, 43C, 44, 45, 46, 46X, 52X, 58X, 59X, 60X, 61X, 62P, 62X, 63X, 66X, 67X, 68X, 69C, 69X, 72, 81, 86, 86A, 86C, 87B, 87D, 87E, 98C, 98S, 203C, 203S, 214, 214P, 230X, 234C, 234D, 234X, 238X, 240X, 242X, 252X, 258A, 258D, 258P, 258S, 259C, 259D, 265B, 268A, 268C, 269C, 270B, 270D, 272E, 272P, 281A, 286C, 286P, 286X, 290, 290A, 290E, 290X, 296C, 296P, 298X, N214, N273, N241, N252, N260, N269, N290, X6C, X42C
- Citybus: 20, 20A, 50, 55, 79P, 79X, 701, 701A, 701S, 702, 702A, 702B, 702S, 793, 795, 795X, A20, A21, A23, A26, A28, A29, E21, E21A, E21B, E21C, E21D, E22, E22A, E22C, E22P, E22S, E22X, N21, N21A, N26, N29, N50, NA20, NA29
- Cross Harbour Tunnel: 102, 102P, 102R, 104, 112, 117, 118, 118P, 171, 171A, 171P, 904, 905, 905A, 905P, 914, 914P, 914X, 936, 936A, 970, 970X, 971, N118, N122, N171, N368, X970

== See also ==
- Politics of Hong Kong
- Sham Shui Po SA
