= Kowloon Southern Link =

MTR line between Nam Cheong and Hung Hom

Coordinates: 22.3090°N 114.1643°E

Kowloon Southern link 九龍南綫
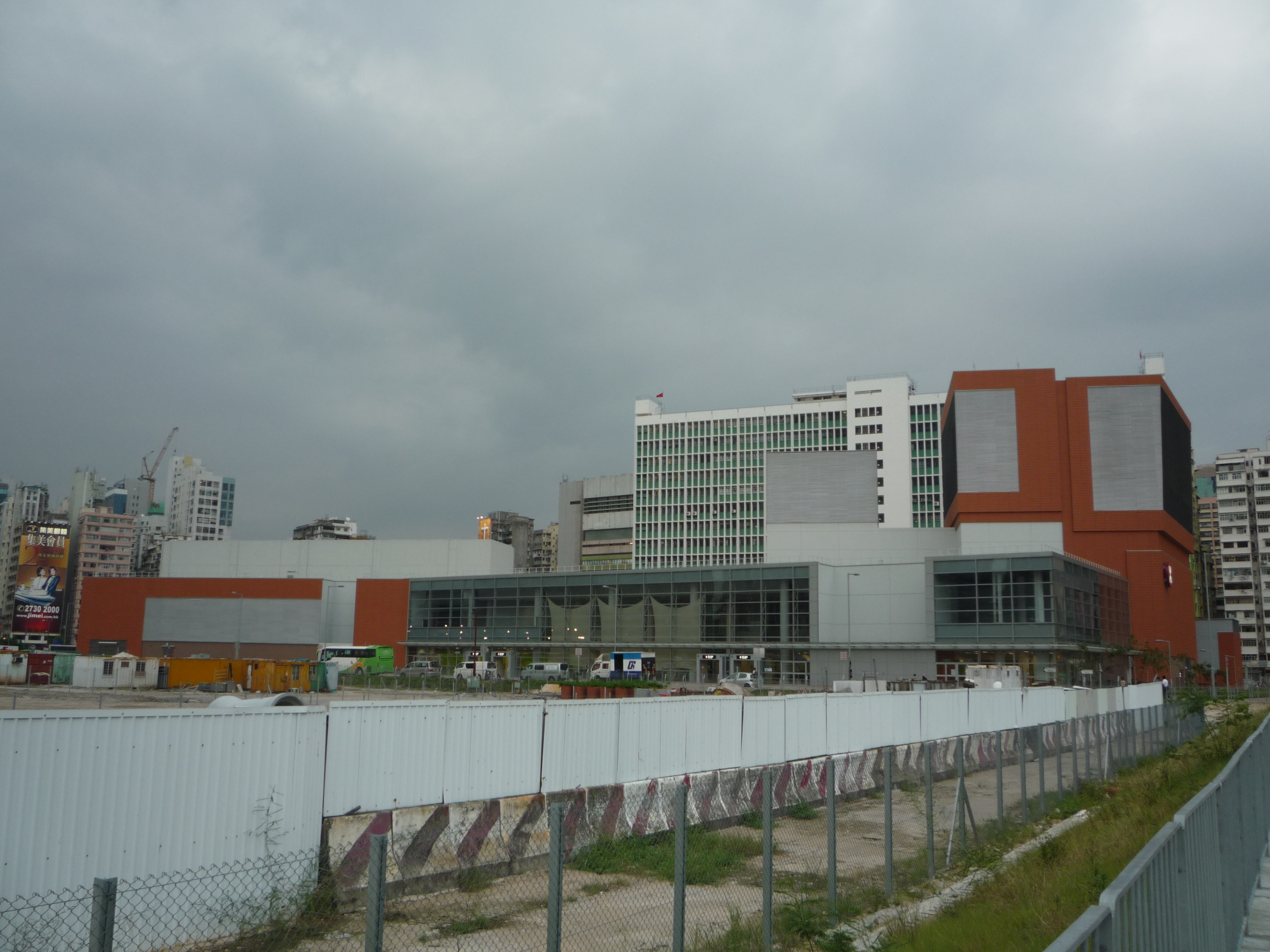
- Exterior view of Austin station

Overview
- Owner: Kowloon-Canton Railway Corporation
- Locale: Yau Tsim Mong District; Sham Shui Po District
- Termini: Nam Cheong; Hung Hom
- Stations: 4

Service
- Type: Heavy rail
- System: MTR East Rail line, Tuen Ma line

History
- Opened: August 16, 2009

Technical
- Line length: 3.8 km (2.4 mi)
- Track gauge: 1,435 mm (4 ft 8 1/2 in) standard gauge
- Electrification: 25 kV 50 Hz AC (Overhead line)

The Kowloon Southern link is a section of the MTR East Rail and Tuen Ma line linking Nam Cheong station and Hung Hom station. The rail link is fully underground, lies along the south-west coastline of Kowloon Peninsula, east of rail tracks of the Tung Chung line and Airport Express. Kowloon Southern Link has one underground intermediate station called Austin station (formerly West Kowloon station). It is located adjacent to the Canton Road Government Offices, close to Kowloon station of Tung Chung line and Airport Express. However, the structures do not provide a direct transfer between the two stations.

== History ==
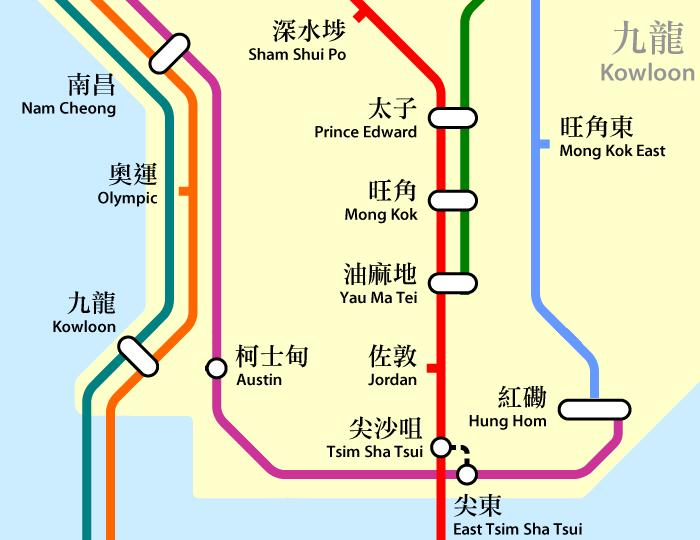
Map of the Kowloon Southern Link before 2021, as part of the West Rail line (in purple)

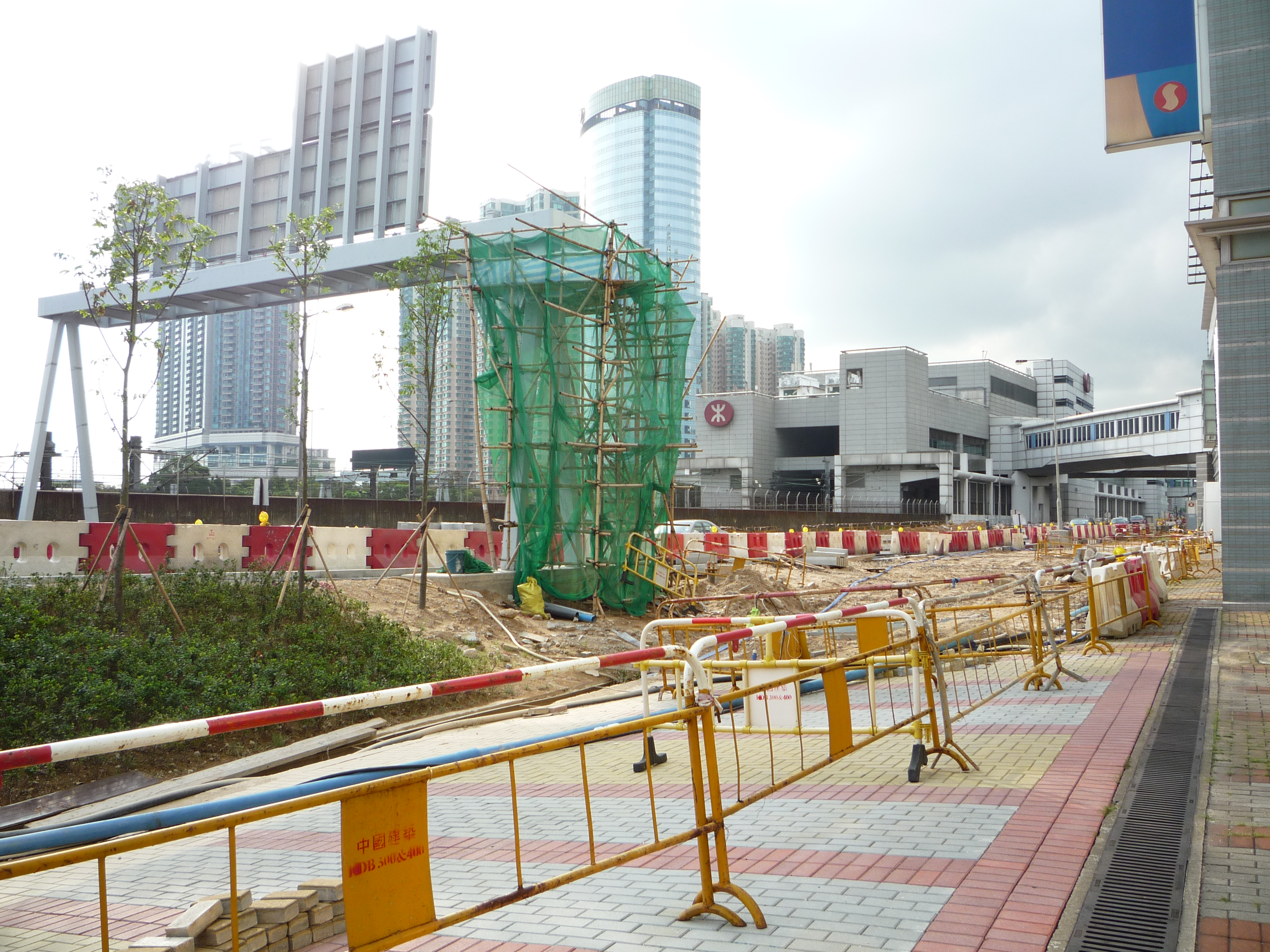
Kowloon Southern Link construction site in June 2009

The project was originally proposed and carried out by Kowloon-Canton Railway Corporation (KCRC) to link the KCR West Rail that terminated at Nam Cheong station to the KCR East Rail at Hung Hom station. The tracks between Hung Hom and East Tsim Sha Tsui station had opened in 2004 as the Tsim Sha Tsui Extension, to alleviate surface traffic jams and congestion at Kowloon Tong station caused by passengers transferring between the KCR East Rail and the MTR by acting as a second interchange between the two systems.

Construction of the Kowloon Southern Link began in late 2005 by the KCRC; after the company's network was taken over by MTR Corporation Limited (MTRC) on 2 December 2007, the project was continued by MTRC. The link went into service on 16 August 2009.

Upon the completion of the rail link, the West Rail line assumed the tracks from the East Tsim Sha Tsui to Hung Hom portion of the East Rail line. At the same time both the East Rail and West Rail lines were altered to terminate in the south at Hung Hom station, with the platform and tracks at Hung Hom being rearranged to provide cross-platform interchange between the two lines (it forms two sets of island platforms).

Upon the opening of the extension, a new Tuen Mun-Hung Hom Monthly Pass was introduced for unlimited rides of the whole West Rail line (including the new extension).

On 27 June 2021, the West Rail line officially merged with the Ma On Shan line (which was already extended into the Tuen Ma line Phase 1 at the time) in East Kowloon to form the new Tuen Ma line, as part of the Shatin to Central link project. Hence, the Kowloon Southern Link portion of the West Rail line was absorbed by the new line and is now the central and southernmost part of the Tuen Ma line.

== Proposed Canton station ==
Canton station (Chinese: 廣東站) was a planned railway station on the Kowloon Southern Link of West Rail line between East Tsim Sha Tsui station and Austin station, beneath the shopping mall, Harbour City in Tsim Sha Tsui, by replacing the existing underground car park. But it was never to be built because of the failed negotiations between the KCRC and The Wharf (Holdings) Limited, the owner of the Harbour City.

Originally KCRC requested The Wharf to fully or partially fund the construction of the station for HKD 1.8 billion. The Wharf disagreed, questioning if it was reasonable for a private enterprise to undertake the construction cost of public facilities. The station was eventually omitted from the project, officially announced on 6 December 2004.

== See also ==
- Sha Tin to Central Link
- Future projects of the MTR
