= Public housing estates in Sham Shui Po =

Public housing in Sham Shui Po, Hong Kong

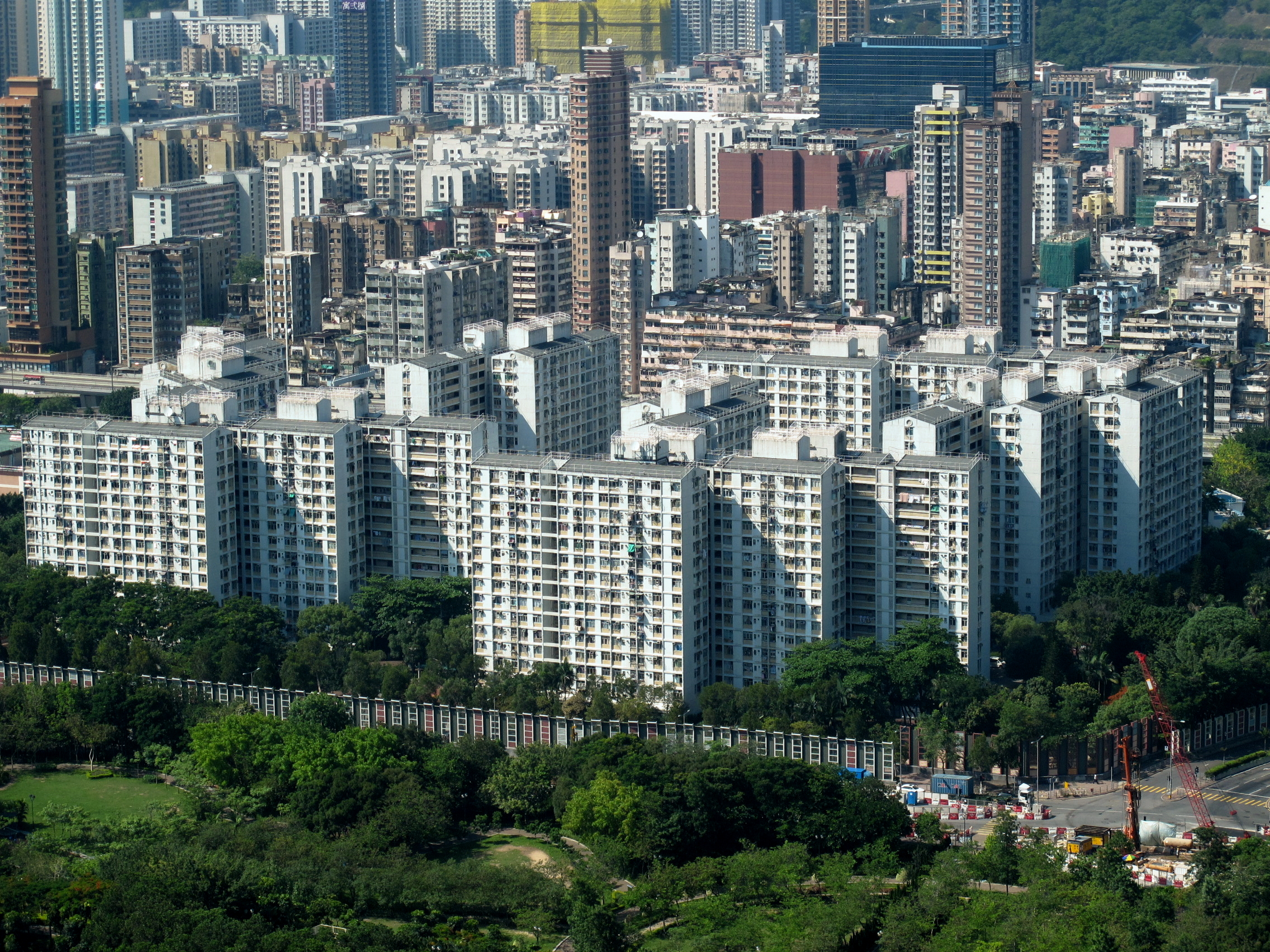
Nam Cheong Estate, with Nam Cheong Park in the foreground

The following is an overview of public housing estates in Sham Shui Po, Hong Kong, including Home Ownership Scheme (HOS), Private Sector Participation Scheme (PSPS), and Tenants Purchase Scheme (TPS) estates.

== History ==
The site where Sham Shui Po Park, Lai Kok Estate, Lai On Estate and Dragon Centre are located were formerly the Sham Shui Po Barracks (Chinese: 深水埗軍營) of the British Army between the 1910s to 1977. During World War II, the barrack was attacked by the Japanese Army and was used as a concentration camp during the Japanese occupation from 1941 to 1945. After the war, the barracks were once again used by British Army until 1977, when they were closed. Part of the site became Lai Kok Estate in 1981, and Sham Shui Po Park in 1983, while another part was a refugee camp for Vietnamese boat people. In 1989, the refugee camp was closed and replaced by Lai On Estate and Dragon Centre in 1993 and 1994 respectively.

In 1992, the Sham Shui Po Ferry Pier terminated ferry service due to West Kowloon Reclamation Project. Fu Cheong Estate was built in 2001 on the site of the bus terminus of the former pier, located between Yen Chow Street and Tung Chau Street. In 1977, the sea outside Tung Chau Street was reclaimed, the ferry pier was relocated near the newly reclaimed land near Yen Chow Street in 1978, and Nam Cheong Estate was built in 1989 on land beyond the old ferry pier located at the junction of Pei Ho Street and Tung Chau Street.

== Overview ==
Name		Type	Inaug.	No Blocks	No Units	Notes
Cronin Garden	樂年花園	Flat-For-Sale	1995	7	728	HK Housing Society
Fu Cheong Estate	富昌邨	Public	2001	10	5,874	
Lai Kok Estate	麗閣邨	Public	1981	8	3,068	
Lai On Estate	麗安邨	Public	1993	5	1,438	
Nam Cheong Estate	南昌邨	Public	1989	9	1,898	
Wing Cheong Estate	榮昌邨	Public	2013	2	1,488	
Yee Ching Court	怡靖苑	HOS	1993	3	672	
Yee Kok Court	怡閣苑	HOS	1981	7	694	

== Cronin Garden ==
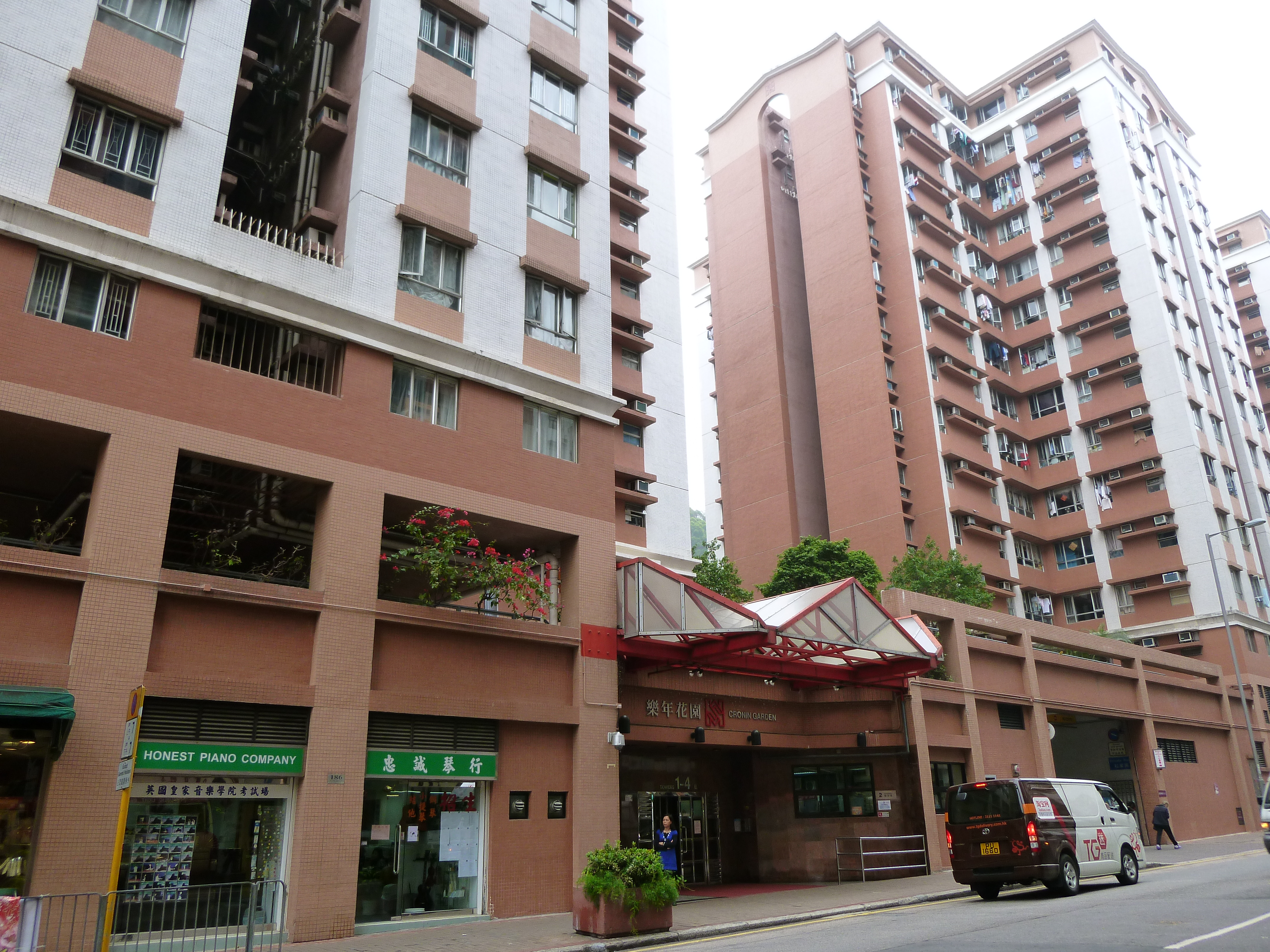
Cronin Garden

Cronin Garden (Chinese: 樂年花園) is a Flat-for-Sale Scheme estates at the junction of Shun Ning Road, Po On Road and Pratas Street in Sham Shui Po. It has totally seven 13-storey blocks, built in 1995 and developed by the Hong Kong Housing Society.

It was built on the site of Sheung Li Uk Estate (上李屋邨), the first estate built by the Hong Kong Housing Society, designed by Stanley Feltham, and completed in 1952.

=== Houses ===
Name	Completion
Block 1	1995
Block 2	1995
Block 3	1995
Block 4	1995
Block 5	1995
Block 6	1995
Block 7	1995

== Fu Cheong Estate ==
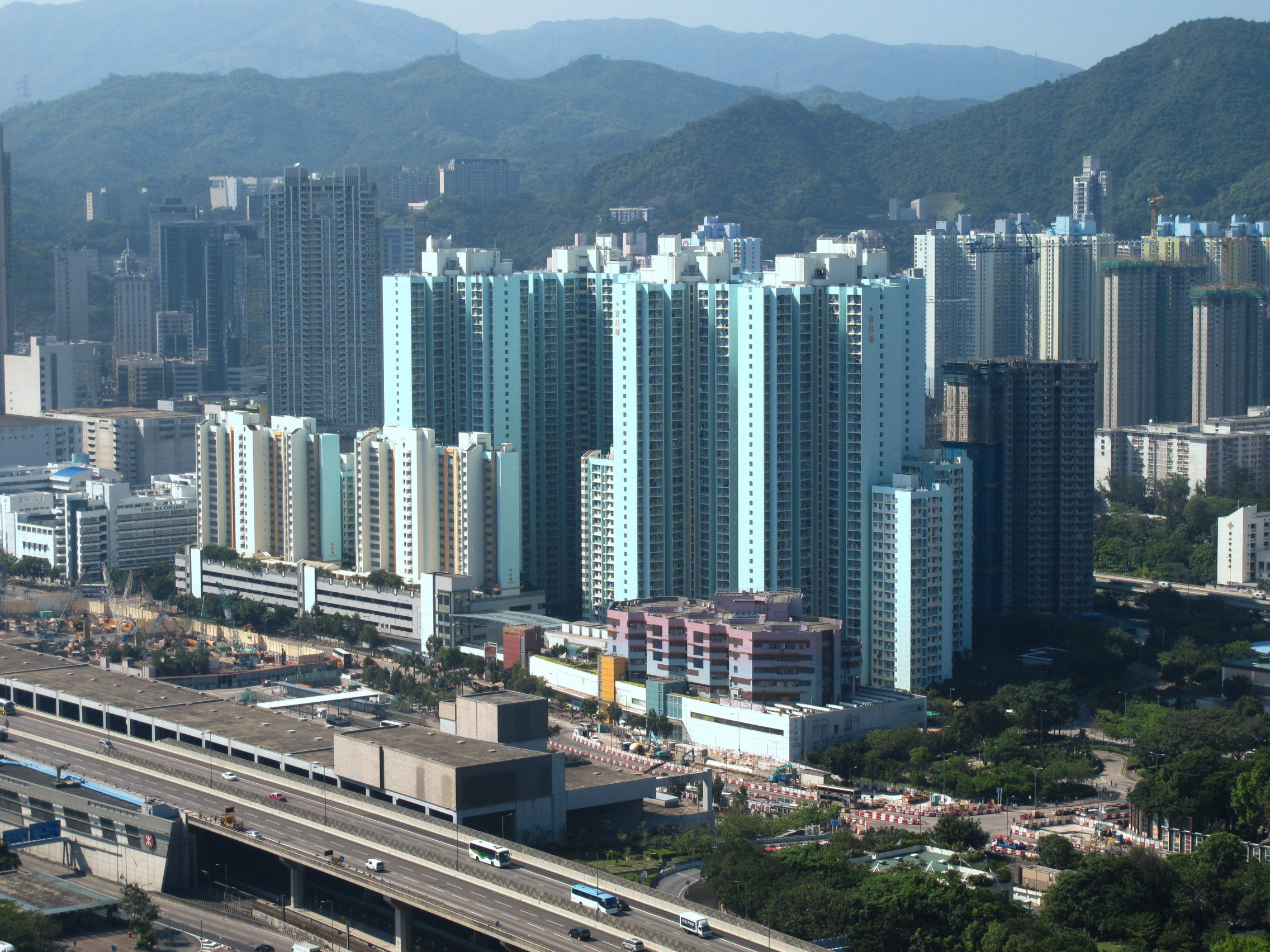
Fu Cheong Estate

Fu Cheong Estate (Chinese: 富昌邨) was built on reclaimed land of the southwest of Sham Shui Po near Nam Cheong station. Fu Cheong Estate was built in 2001, Fu Cheong Estate was constructed on the former site of the Sham Shui Po bus terminus. Its name, "Fu Cheong", comes from nearby Nam Cheong Estate and means "Wealthy and Prosperity" in Chinese language. It consists of 10 residential buildings and a shopping centre completed in 2001 and 2002.

=== Houses ===
Name	Type	Completion
Fu Hoi House	Single Aspect Building	2001
Fu Leung House	Single Aspect Building	2001
Fu Yee House	Single Aspect Building	2001
Fu Loy House	Harmony 1	2001
Fu Sing House	Harmony 1	2001
Fu Wong House	Harmony 1	2001
Fu Wen House	Harmony 1	2001
Fu Ying House	Harmony 1	2001
Fu Yuet House	Harmony 1	2002
Fu Yun House	Senior Citizens	2002

== Lai Kok Estate ==
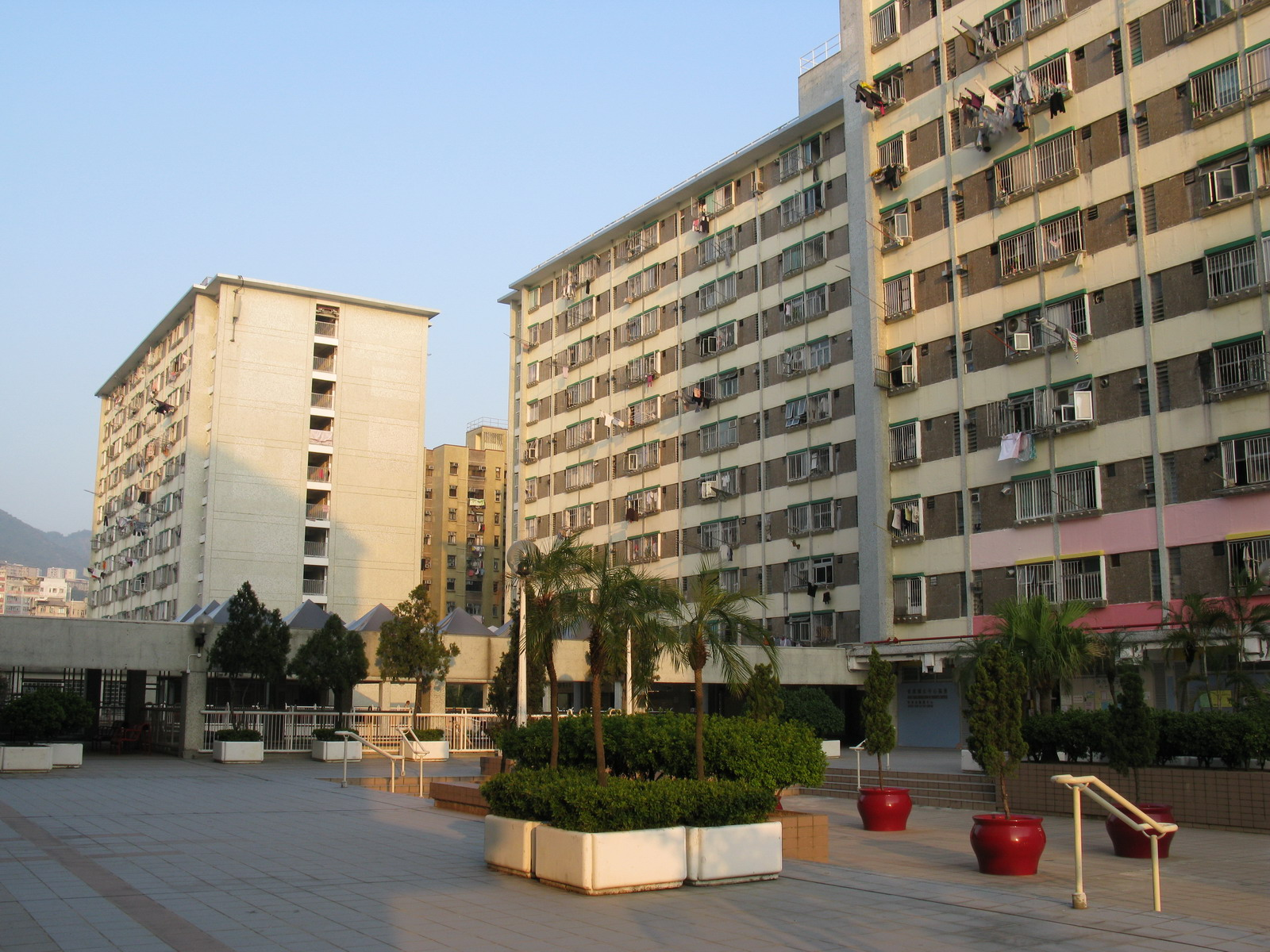
Lai Ho House and Lai Lan House, Lai Kok Estate

Lai Kok Estate (Chinese: 麗閣邨) was built on reclaimed land of the west of Yen Chow Street, Sham Shui Po, located near Lai On Estate, Dragon Centre, and Cheung Sha Wan station. It consists of 8 residential blocks completed in 1981.

=== Houses ===
Name	Type	Completion
Lai Huen House	Triple I	1981
Lai Lo House	Triple I	1981
Lai Mei House	Triple I	1981
Lai Fu House	Old Slab	1981
Lai Ho House	Old Slab	1981
Lai Kuk House	Old Slab	1981
Lai Kwai House	Old Slab	1981
Lai Lan House	Old Slab	1981

== Lai On Estate ==
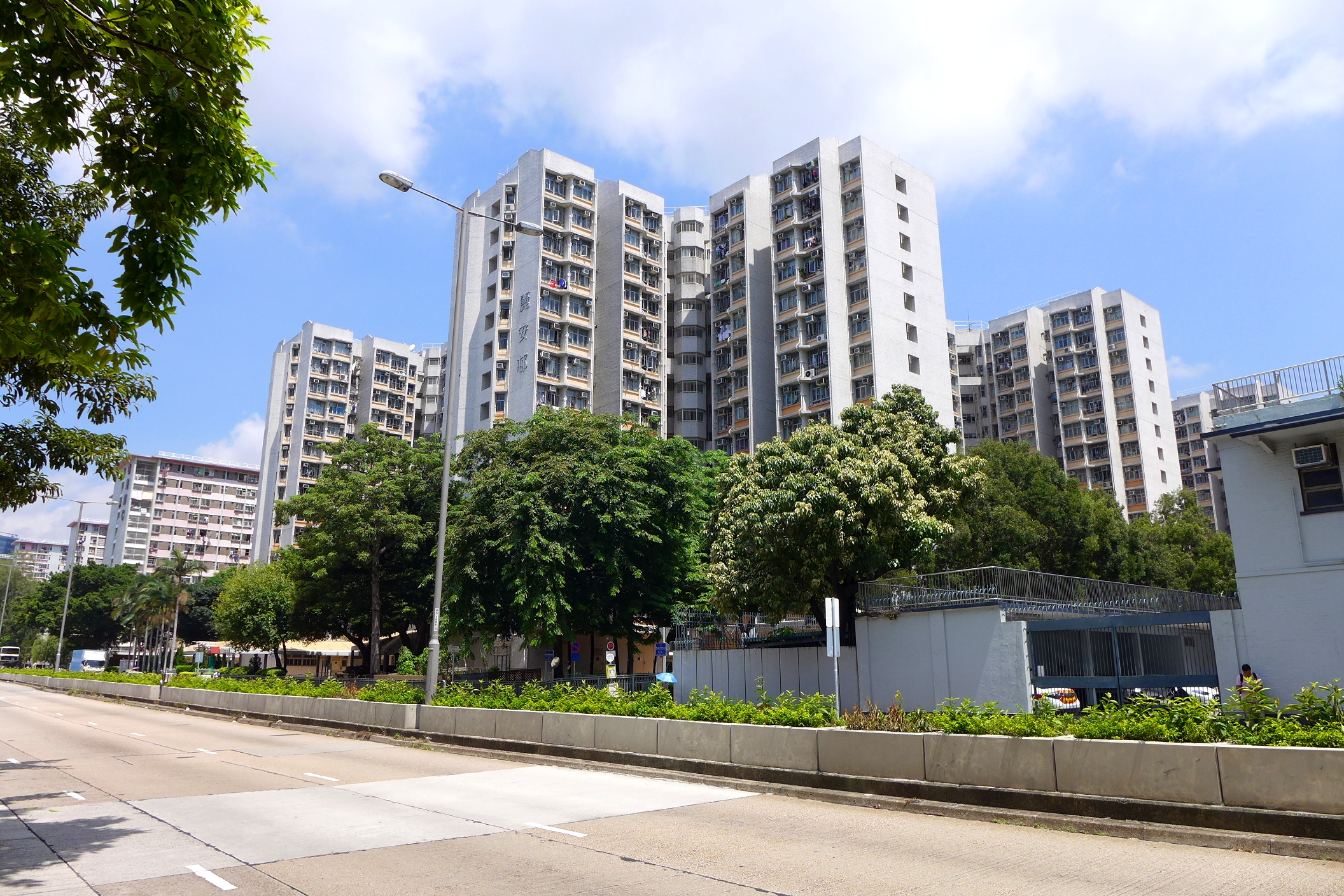
Lai On Estate

Lai On Estate (Chinese: 麗安邨) is located near Lai Kok Estate, Dragon Centre, and Sham Shui Po station. It consists of 5 residential blocks completed in 1993.

=== Houses ===
Name	Type	Completion
Lai Ching House	Harmony 1A	1993
Lai Lim House	Harmony 1A	1993
Lai Ping House	Harmony 1A	1993
Lai Tak House	Harmony 1A	1993
Lai Wing House	Harmony 1A	1993

== Nam Cheong Estate ==
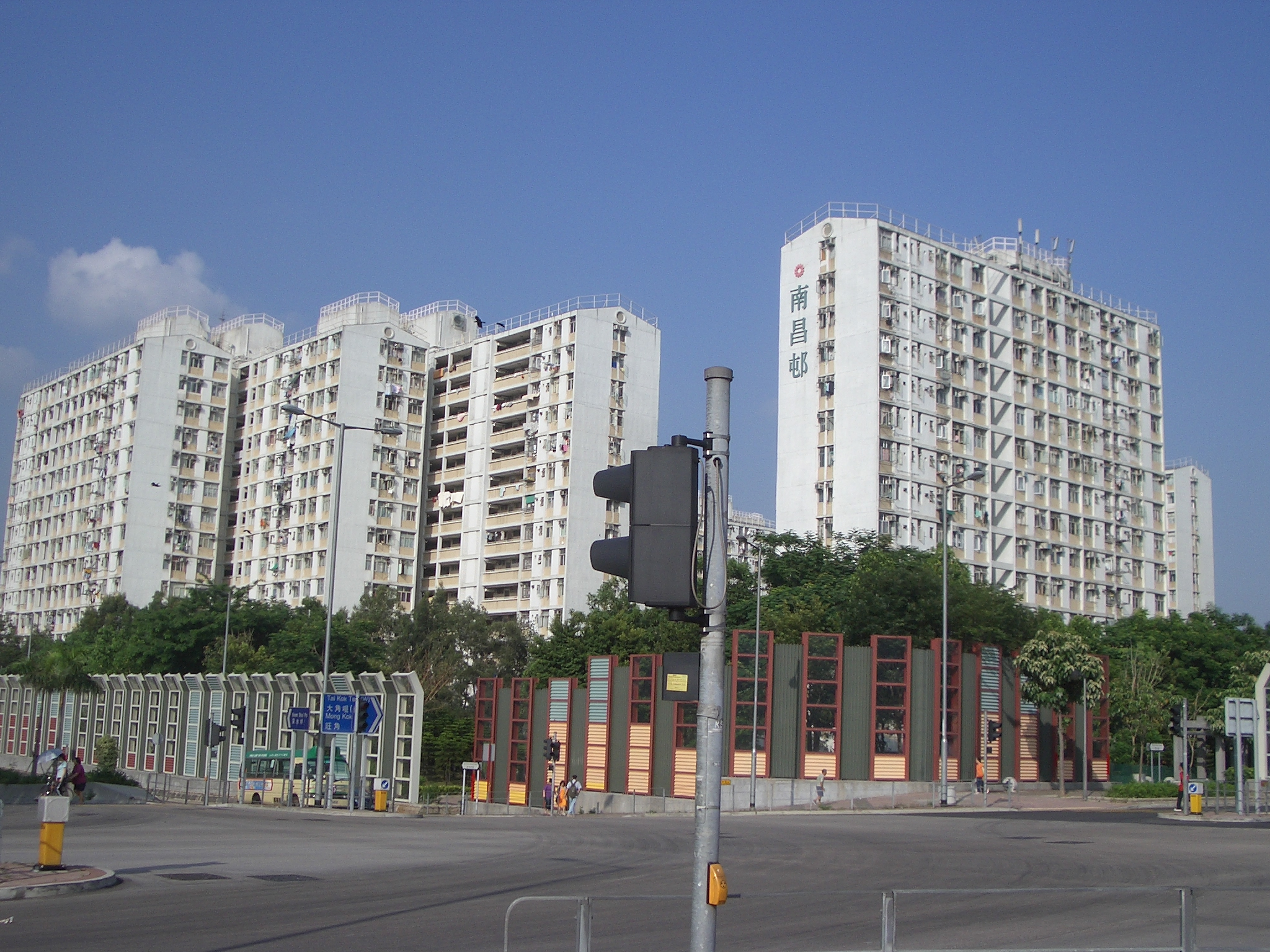
Nam Cheong Estate

Nam Cheong Estate (Chinese: 南昌邨) is named from nearby Nam Cheong Street, a main street in Sham Shui Po District. It consists of seven residential blocks completed in 1989. In 2005, the estate was sold to tenants through Tenants Purchase Scheme Phase 6B.

The estate is surrounded by Tung Chau Street Park.

=== Houses ===
Name	Type	Completion
Cheong Him House	Linear 1	1989
Cheong On House	Linear 1	1989
Cheong Shun House	Linear 3	1989
Cheong Yat House	Linear 3	1989
Cheong Chit House	Linear 3	1989
Cheong Chung House	Linear 3	1989
Cheong Yin House	Linear 3	1989

== Wing Cheong Estate ==
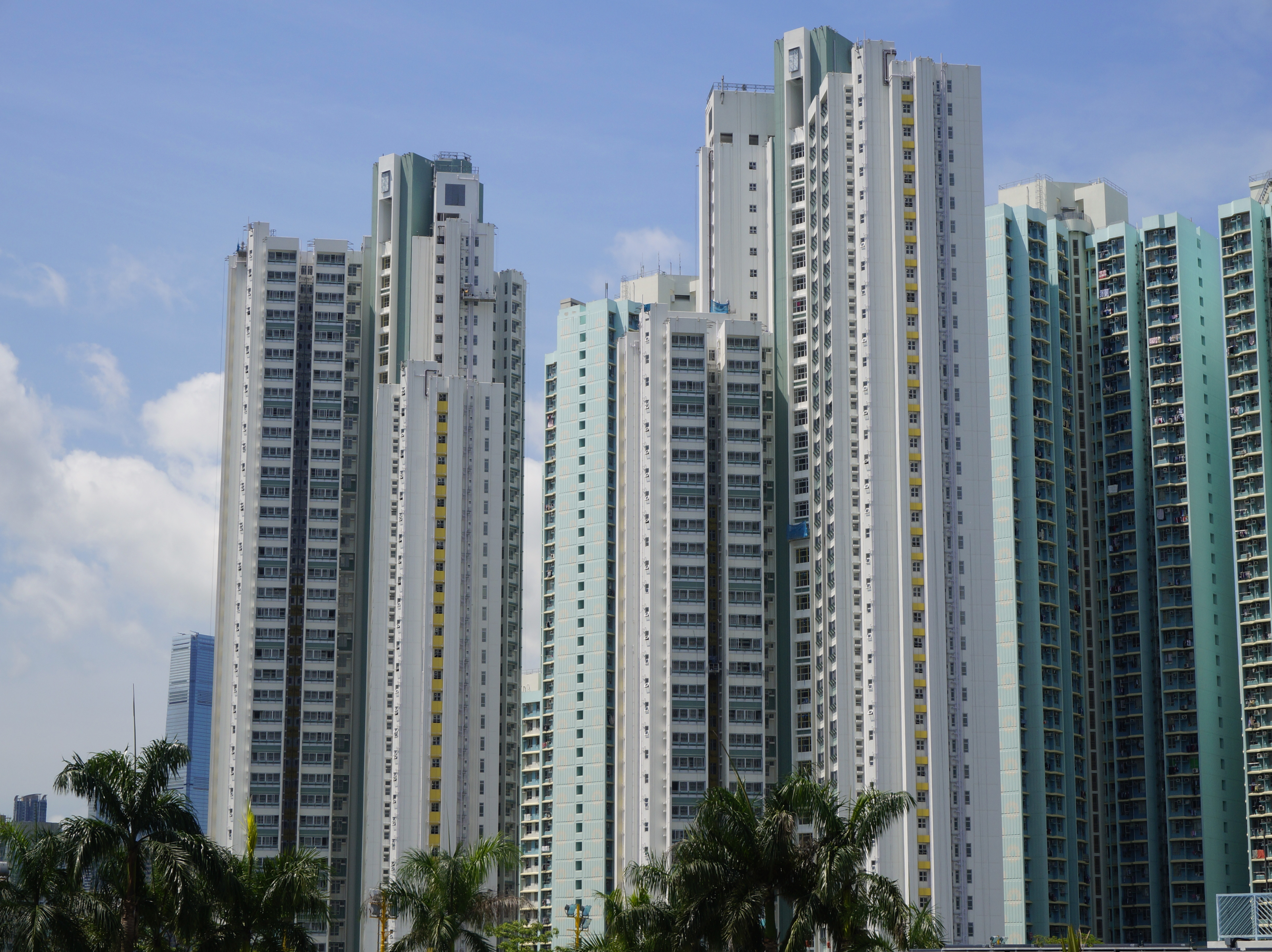
Wing Cheong Estate

Wing Cheong Estate is composed of two Y-shaped blocks completed 2013, between Fu Cheong Estate and the West Kowloon Corridor, on Sai Chuen Road. It provides about 1500 public rental flats. The main contractor for the estate's construction was Paul Y Engineering.

To mitigate the noise nuisance of the adjacent West Kowloon Corridor, the flats facing this motorway are equipped with "acoustic balconies". The balcony parapet incorporates an inclined glass panel to deflect noise, and the walls and ceiling of the balconies are faced with sound-absorbing panels.

=== Houses ===
Name	Type	Completion
Wing Chun House	Non-standard block	2013
Wing Kit House	Non-standard block	2013

== Yee Ching Court ==
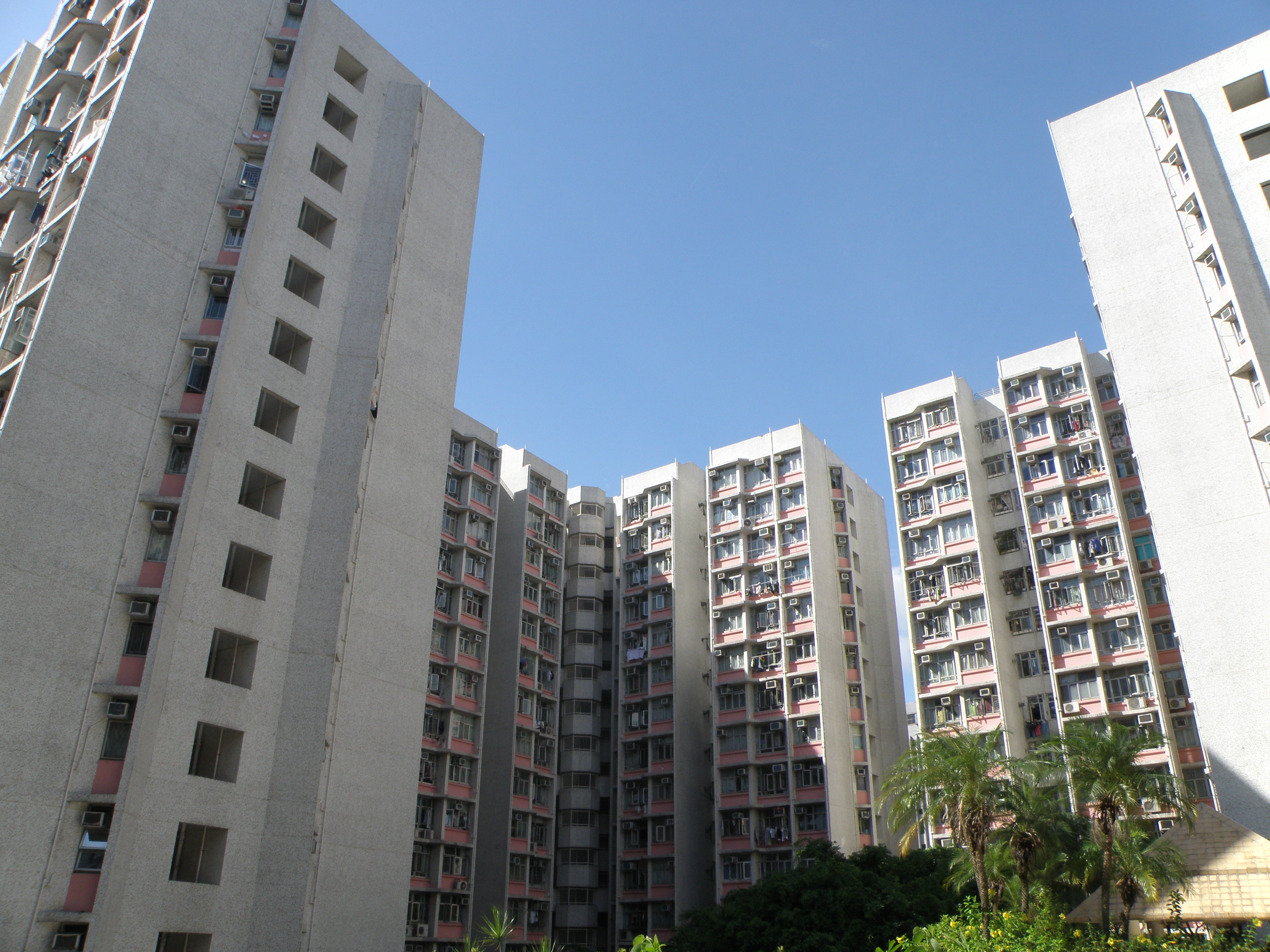
Yee Ching Court

Yee Ching Court (Chinese: 怡靖苑) is a HOS court in Sham Shui Po, next to Lai Kok Estate, Lai On Estate and Dragon Centre. It has 3 blocks built in 1993.

=== Houses ===
Name	Type	Completion
Han Ching House	Harmony 1A	1993
Ning Ching House	Harmony 1A	1993
Yat Ching House	Harmony 1A	1993

== Yee Kok Court ==
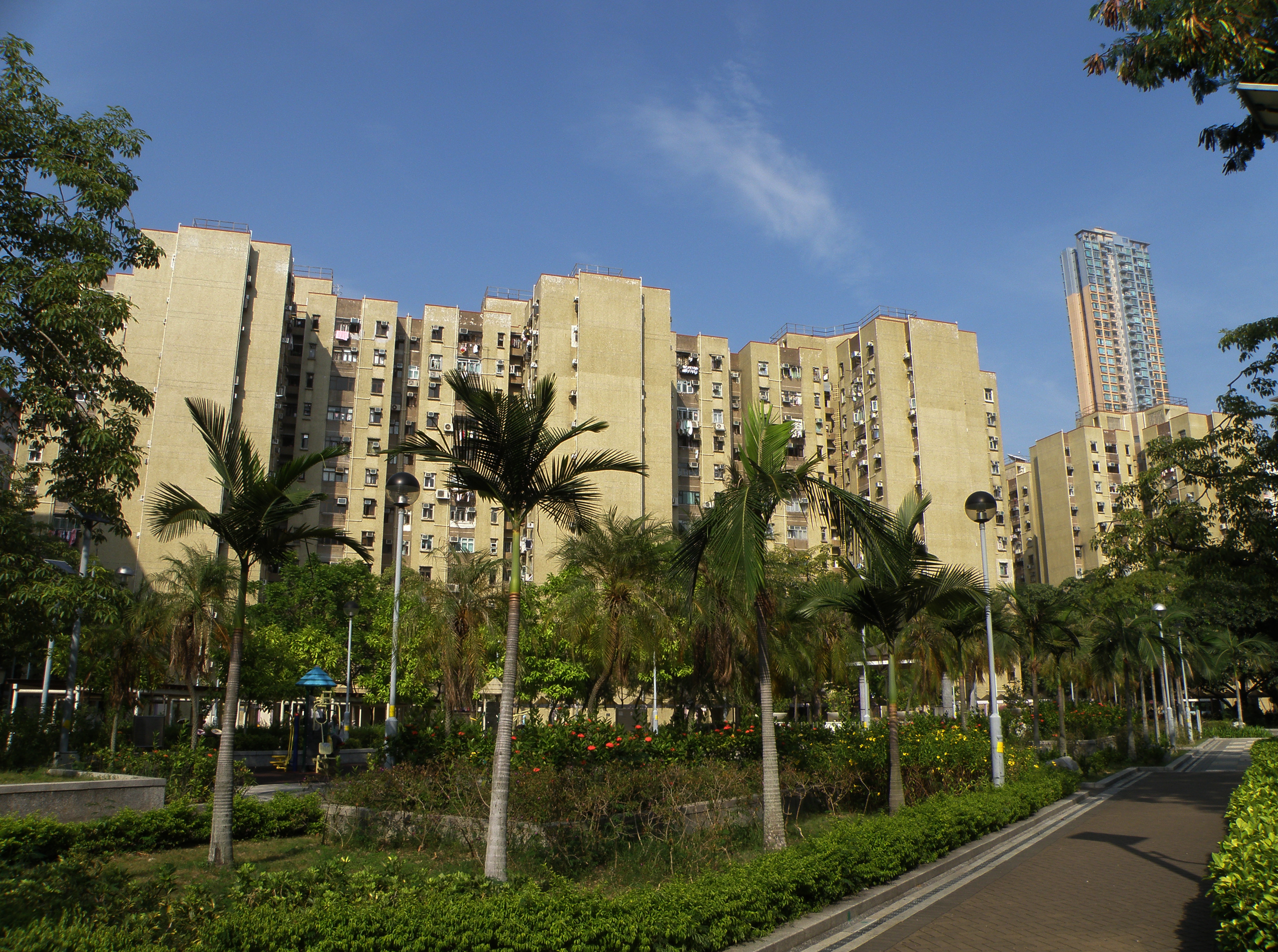
Yee Kok Court

Yee Kok Court (Chinese: 怡閣苑) is a HOS court in Sham Shui Po, next to Lai Kok Estate, Lai On Estate and Dragon Centre. It has 7 blocks built in 1981.

=== Houses ===
Name	Type	Completion
Yee Lok House	Old-Cruciform	1981
Yee Mei House	Old-Cruciform	1981
Yee Kin House	Old-Cruciform	1981
Yee Tai House	Old-Cruciform	1981
Yee Hong House	Old-Cruciform	1983
Yee Yan House	Old-Cruciform	1983
Yee Sau House	Old-Cruciform	1983

== See also ==
- Public housing in Hong Kong
- List of public housing estates in Hong Kong
