= Wing Cheong Estate =

Public housing estate in Sham Shui Po, Hong Kong

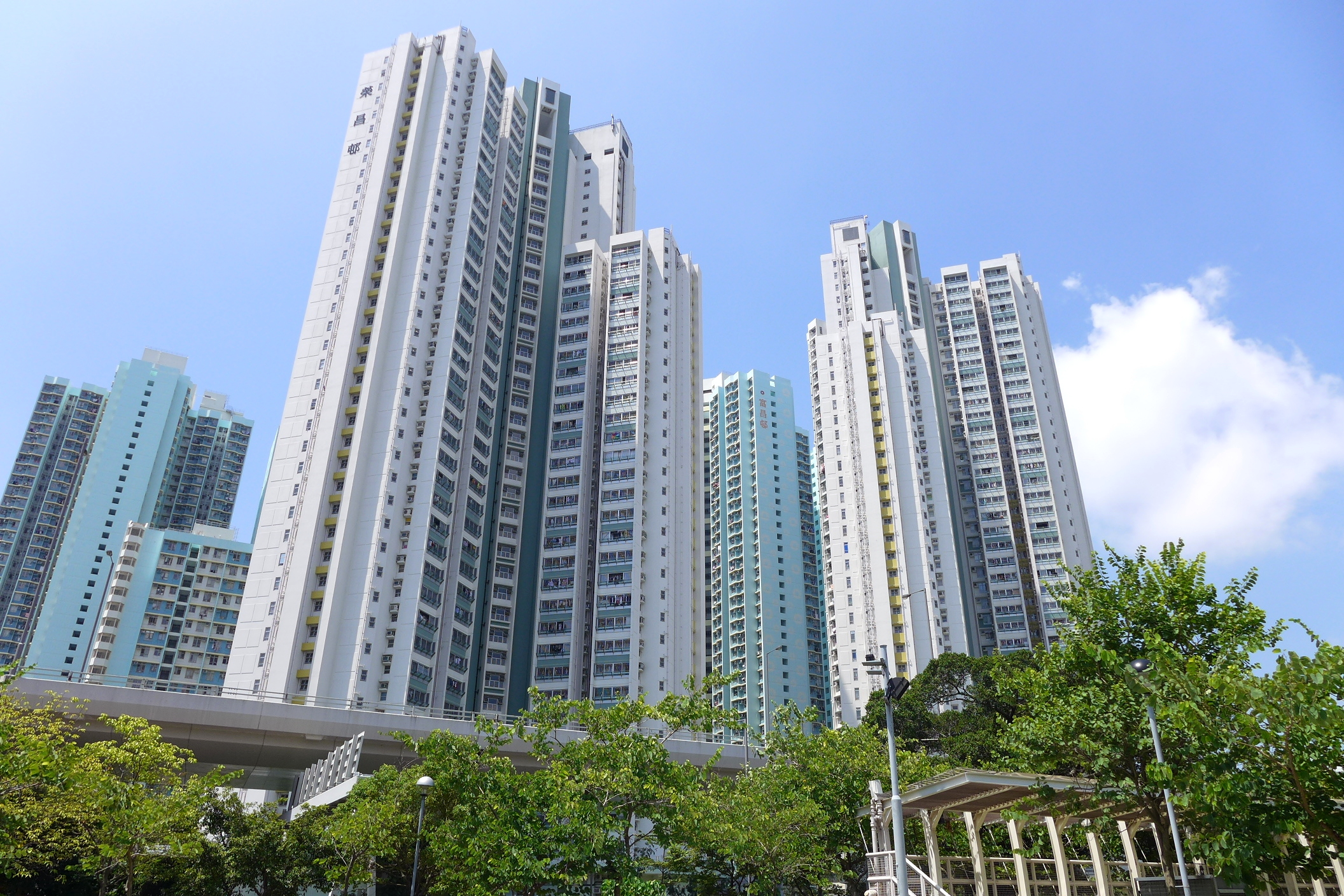
- Wing Cheong Estate
- Interactive map of Wing Cheong Estate

General information
- Location: 20 Sai Chuen Road, Sham Shui Po; Kowloon, Hong Kong
- Coordinates: 22.329313°N 114.155441°E
- Status: Completed
- Category: Public rental housing
- Population: 3,654 (2016)
- No. of blocks: 2
- No. of units: 1,488

Construction
- Constructed: 2013; 13 years ago
- Contractors: Paul Y. Engineering
- Authority: Hong Kong Housing Authority

Wing Cheong Estate (Chinese: 榮昌邨) is a public housing estate in Sham Shui Po, Kowloon, Hong Kong. It composes two Y-shaped residential blocks completed in 2013, between Fu Cheong Estate and the West Kowloon Corridor, on Sai Chuen Road. It provides about 1500 public rental flats. The main contractor for the estate's construction was Paul Y. Engineering.

To mitigate the noise nuisance of the adjacent West Kowloon Corridor, the flats facing this motorway are equipped with "acoustic balconies". The balcony parapet incorporates an inclined glass panel to deflect noise, and the walls and ceiling of the balconies are faced with sound-absorbing panels.

== Houses ==
Name	Chinese name	Building type	Completed
Wing Chun House	榮俊樓	Non-standard	2013
Wing Kit House	榮傑樓	Non-standard	2013

== Demographics ==
According to the 2016 by-census, Wing Cheong Estate had a population of 3,654. The median age was 40.3 and the majority of residents (96.1 per cent) were of Chinese ethnicity. The average household size was 2.4 people. The median monthly household income of all households (i.e. including both economically active and inactive households) was HK$16,160.

== Politics ==
Wing Cheong Estate is located in Fu Cheong constituency of the Sham Shui Po District Council. It was formerly represented by Wong Kit-long, who was elected in the 2019 elections until July 2021.

== See also ==
- Public housing estates in Sham Shui Po
