= Ma Wan (constituency) =

- Elected constituency for the Tsuen Wan District Council
- Boundary of Ma Wan in Tsuen Wan District
- District: Tsuen Wan
- Legislative Council constituency: New Territories South West
- Population: 15,648 (2019)
- Electorate: 6,983 (2019)

Current constituency
- Created: 2015
- Number of members: One
- Member: Vacant
- Created from: Tsuen Wan Rural West

Ma Wan (Chinese: 馬灣) is one of the 18 constituencies in the Tsuen Wan District of Hong Kong which was created in 2015.

The constituency loosely covers the Ma Wan and northern Lantau with the estimated population of 15,126.

== Councillors represented ==
Election	Member	Party
2015	Roy Tam Hoi-pong→Vacant (Note: Resigned on 19 April 2021.)	Neo Democrats

== Election results ==
=== 2010s ===
Tsuen Wan District Council Election, 2019: Ma Wan
Party	Candidate	Votes	%	±%
Neo Democrats	Roy Tam Hoi-pong	3,538	69.09	
Independent	Wong Chun-yeung	1,493	29.15	
Nonpartisan	Lun Chi-wai	90	1.76	
Majority		2,045	31.94	
Turnout		5,174	74.13	
Neo Democrats hold		Swing		

Tsuen Wan District Council Election, 2015: Ma Wan
Party	Candidate	Votes	%	±%
Neo Democrats	Roy Tam Hoi-pong	1,668	48.4	
NPP	Kevin Wong Chiu-wah	1,056	30.6	
Nonpartisan	Justin Tseng Wen-tien	529	15.4	
Third Side	William Luk Wai-leung	193	5.6	
Majority		612	17.8	
Turnout		3,469	61.3	
Neo Democrats win (new seat)				
