= Nam Cheong station =

MTR station interchange in Kowloon, Hong Kong

Nam Cheong 南昌
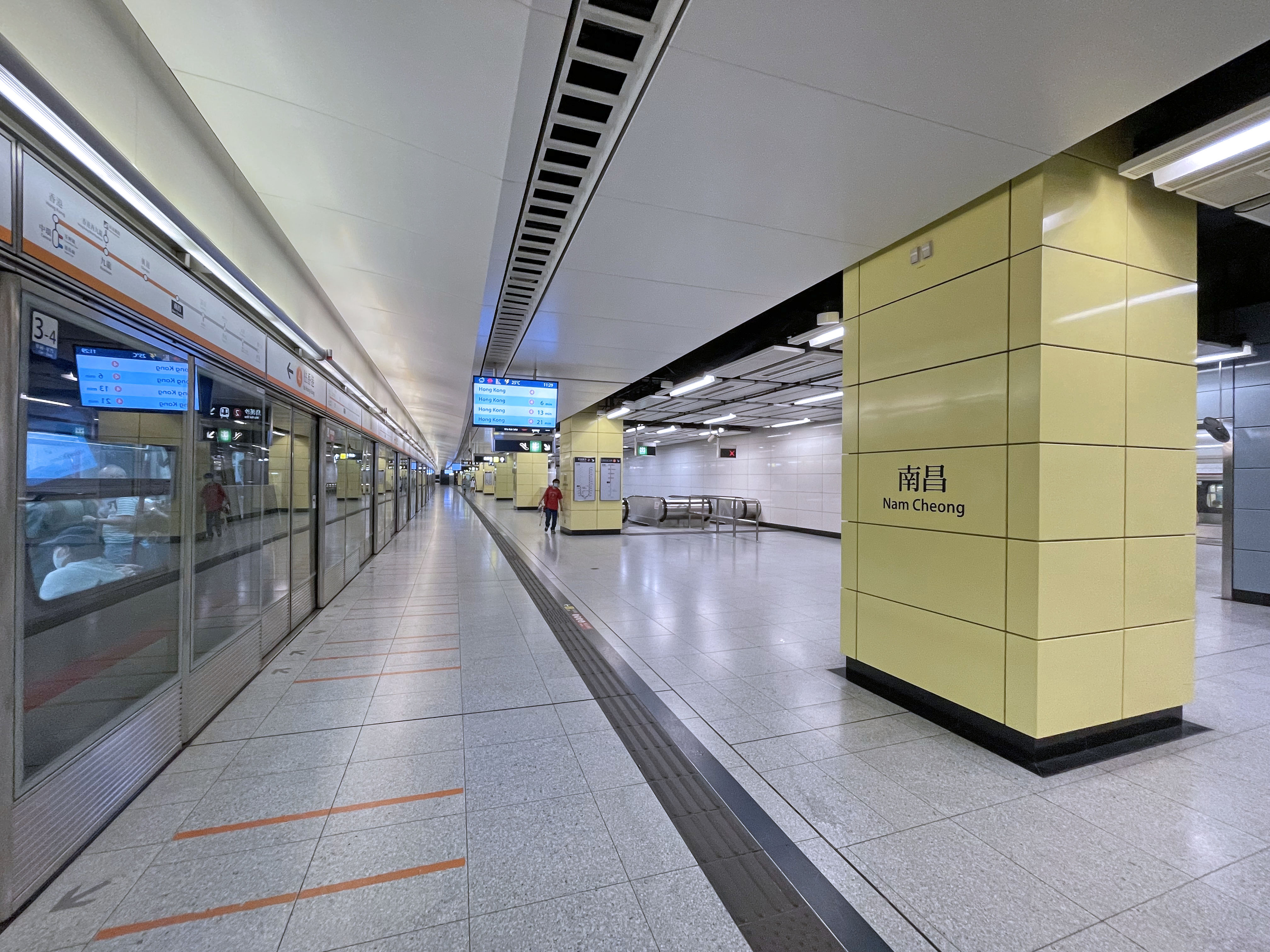
- Platform 2 of Nam Cheong station in June 2021

Chinese name
- Chinese: 南昌
- Cantonese Yale: Nàamchēung
- Literal meaning: South(wards) thriving
Transcriptions
Standard Mandarin
- Hanyu Pinyin: Nánchāng
Yue: Cantonese
- Yale Romanization: Nàamchēung
- Jyutping: Naam4coeng1

General information
- Location: West Kowloon Highway near Fu Cheong Estate, Sham Shui Po; Sham Shui Po District, Hong Kong
- Coordinates: 22°19′36″N 114°09′12″E
- System: MTR rapid transit station
- Owner: Tuen Ma line : KCR Corporation; Tung Chung line : MTR Corporation
- Operator: MTR Corporation
- Lines: Tung Chung line; Tuen Ma line
- Platforms: 4 (1 island platform and 2 side platforms)
- Tracks: 6
- Connections: Bus, minibus

Construction
- Structure type: Tung Chung line : At-grade, not covered; Tuen Ma line : At-grade, fully covered
- Platform levels: 1
- Accessible: Yes
- Architect: Aedas (then known as Liang Peddle Thorp Architects & Planners) and Hong Kong Government city planners

Other information
- Station code: NAC

History
- Opened: Tung Chung line : 16 December 2003; West Rail line : 20 December 2003

Services
Preceding station	MTR	Following station
Mei Foo towards Tuen Mun	Tuen Ma line	Austin towards Wu Kai Sha
Olympic towards Hong Kong	Tung Chung line	Lai King towards Tung Chung
Airport Express does not stop here
Track layout
Location
- Location within MTR

Nam Cheong is a MTR interchange station located at ground level beneath West Kowloon Highway, in Sham Shui Po, Hong Kong opposite the Fu Cheong Estate. It is served by the Tung Chung and Tuen Ma lines and provides cross-platform interchange between platform 1 (Tuen Ma line towards Tuen Mun) and platform 4 (Tung Chung line towards Hong Kong). The livery of Nam Cheong station is sulfur yellow. Platform screen doors are fitted in this station.

Nam Cheong station was originally the western terminus of the West Rail line before the opening of Kowloon Southern Link on 16 August 2009. The Airport Express passes between the tracks of the Tung Chung line without stopping at this station. A public transport interchange, located to the east of the station, allows for transfers to other modes of public transport. Architecture firm Aedas designed Nam Cheong station.

== History ==
Nam Cheong station was called Yen Chow Street station (after Yen Chow Street, a major thoroughfare in the area) in its planning stage. The station was subsequently renamed "Nam Cheong" after Nam Cheong Estate, a nearby public housing estate, which in turn is named after Nam Cheong Street (another thoroughfare).

Works for Nam Cheong station started on 5 October 2000; the station was built by a joint venture between Balfour Beatty and Zen Pacific. The station was opened for public use on 16 December 2003, coinciding with the pre-opening charity trial run day of the KCR West Rail (later West Rail line), and the Tung Chung line part of the station started operation. On 20 December, the KCR West Rail officially commenced operation, and Nam Cheong became the southern terminus of the rail line.

Upon its completion, the station was a shared-use integrated station between MTR and KCR, and the first integrated one between the two systems. The station concourse was divided into two parts (managed by the two rail operators respectively). Special transfer turnstiles were located between the two parts, enabling passengers paying with Octopus card to interchange between the two systems by tapping their card just once.

The operations of MTR and KCR merged on 2 December 2007, and the management of the station unified under MTRCL. Following the network-wide fare zone merger of the former MTR and KCR networks on 28 September 2008, the transfer turnstiles along with the barriers separating the two fare zones were removed, and cross-platform interchange is now provided between platform 1 (Tuen Ma line towards Tuen Mun) and platform 4 (Tung Chung line towards Hong Kong) and platform 2 (Tuen Ma line towards Wu Kai Sha and platform 3 (Tung Chung line towards Tung Chung); several passageways were opened between the two platforms. One of the wider passages is aligned with the fifth and sixth carriages of the Hong Kong-bound trains on the Tung Chung line platform.

The Kowloon Southern Link extension of West Rail line opened on 16 August 2009, and the once called West Rail line was extended to Hung Hom on that day. Nam Cheong lost its status as the western terminus of West Rail line, and became an intermediate station for both Tung Chung and West Rail lines.

On 27 June 2021, the West Rail line officially merged with the Ma On Shan line (which was already extended into the Tuen Ma line Phase 1 at the time) in East Kowloon to form the new Tuen Ma line, as part of the Shatin to Central link project. Hence, Nam Cheong was included in the project and is now an intermediate station on the Tuen Ma line.

== Station layout ==
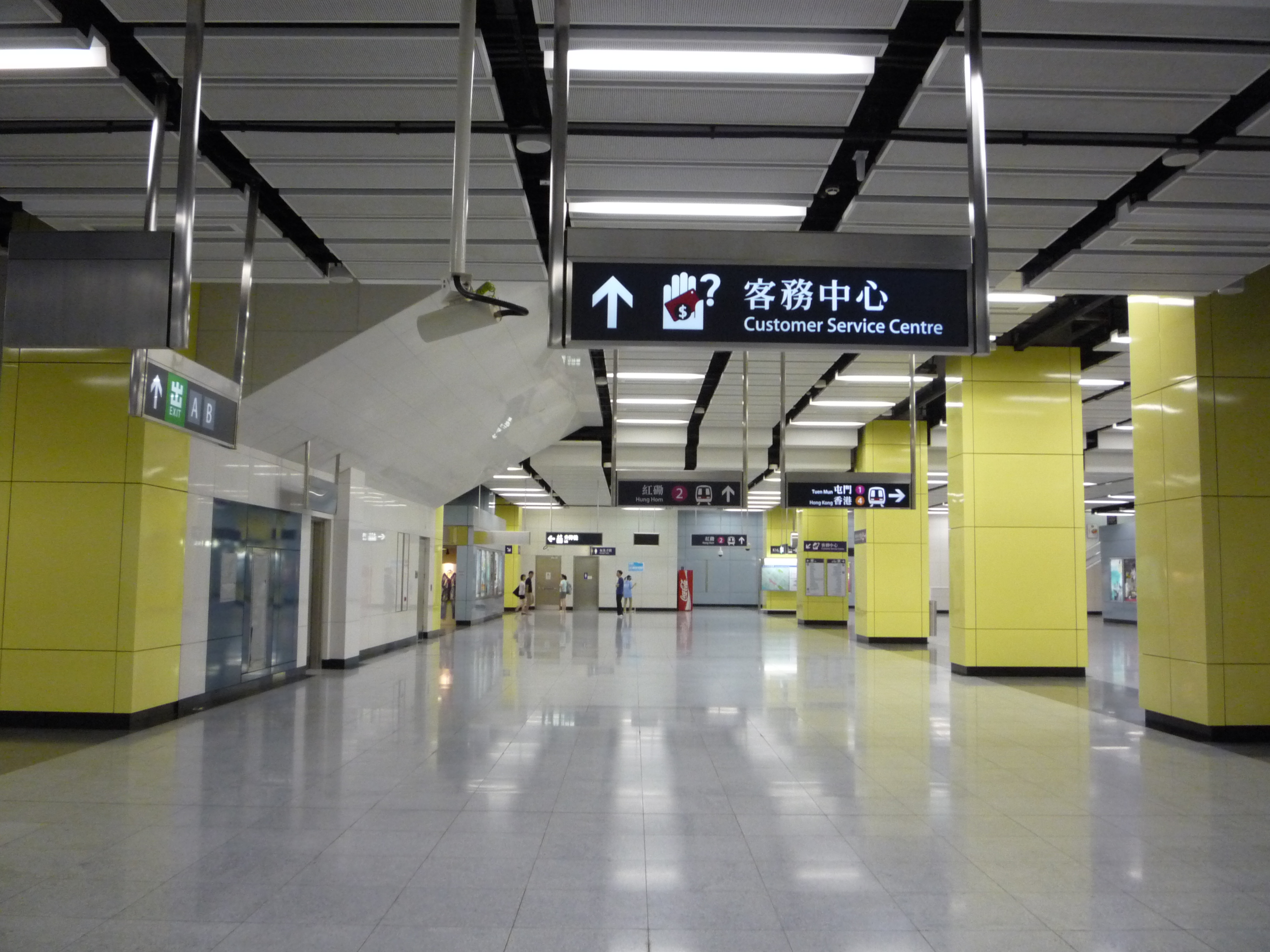
Station concourse in August 2009

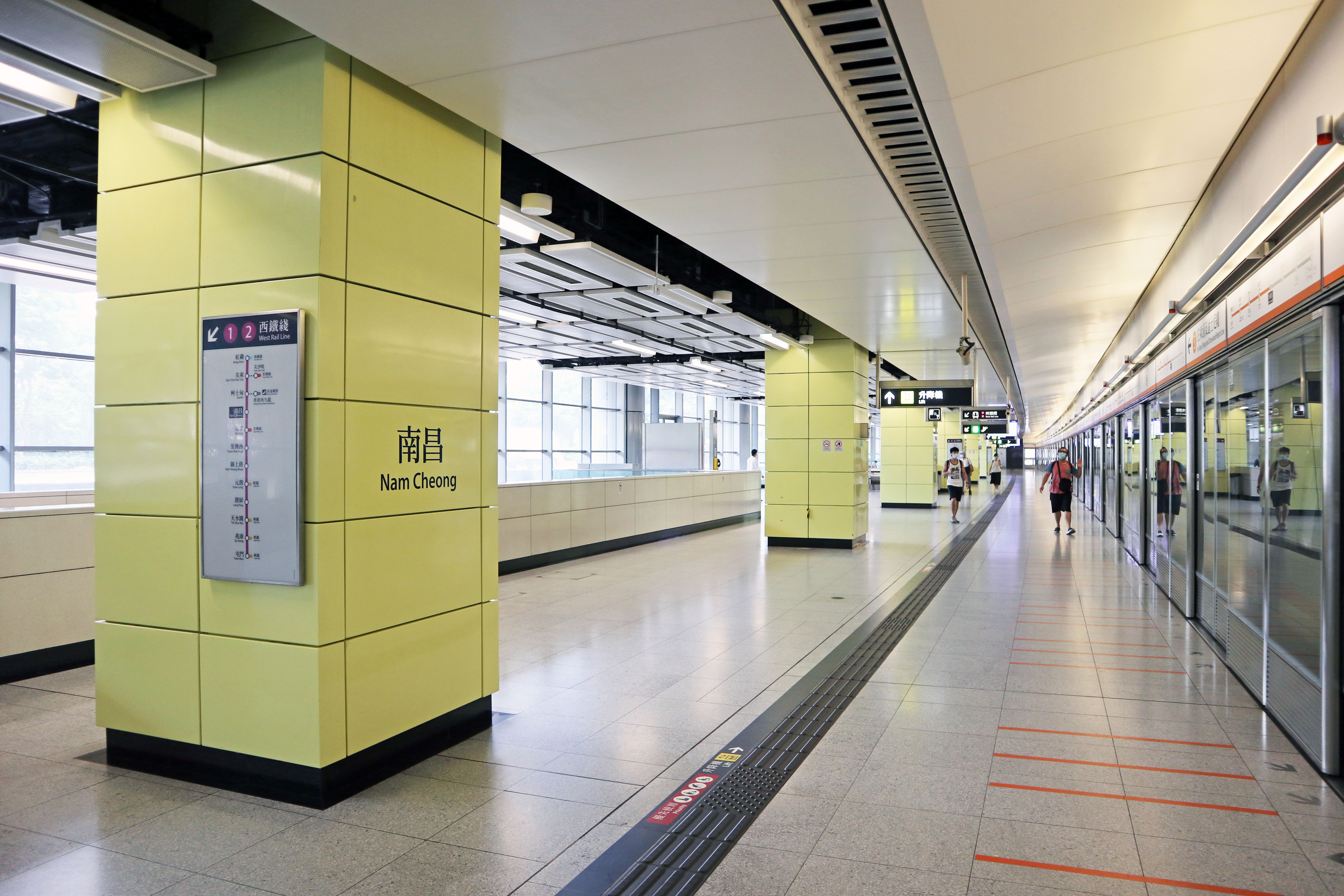
Platform 3 in August 2020

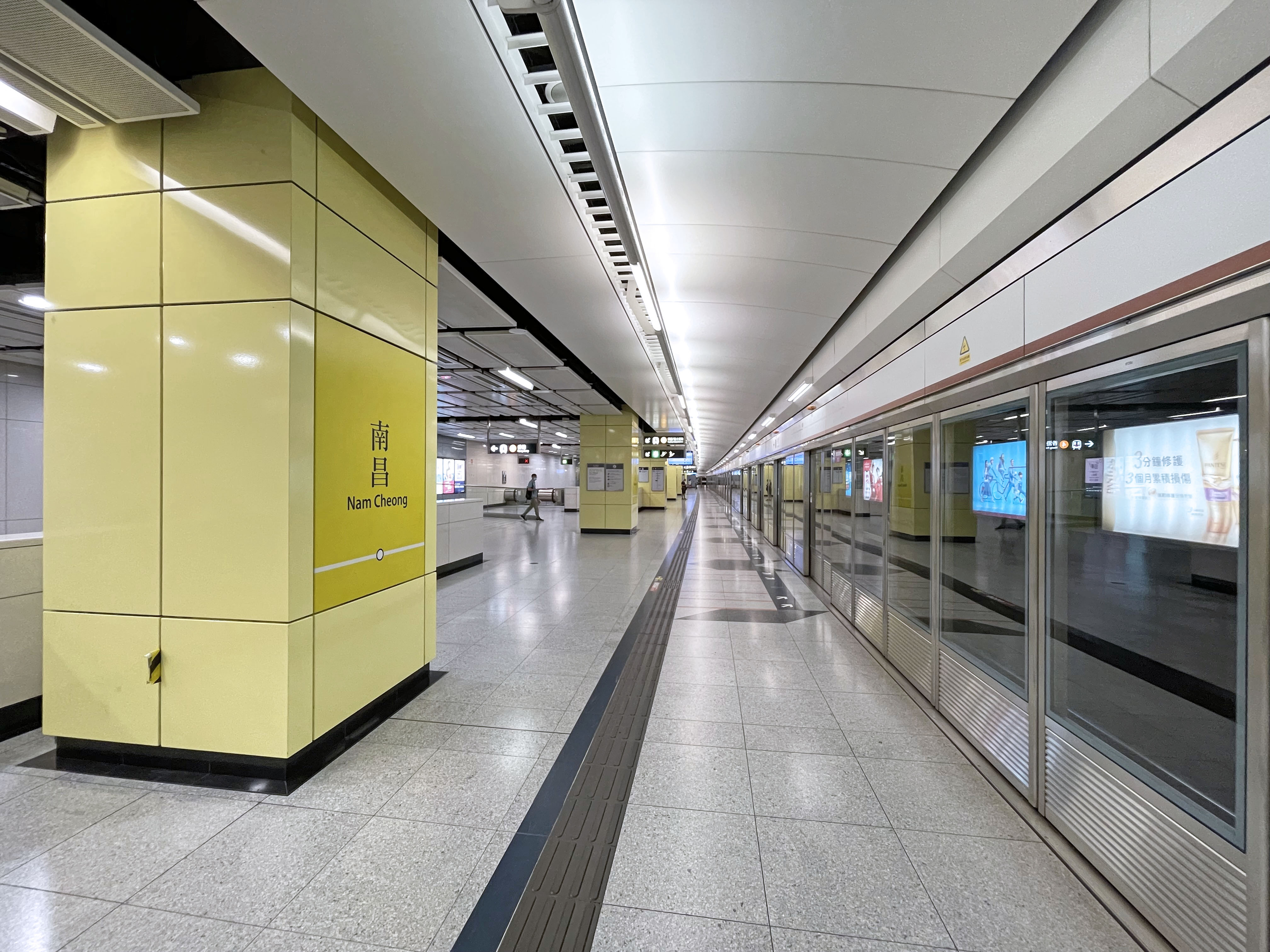
Platform 1 Tuen Ma Line in June 2021

All four platforms are located at ground level. The platforms are curved because they were built around the existing tracks. However, the gaps are not very large.

Before the merging of fare systems on 28 September 2008, Octopus card users transferring between the West Rail line and Tung Chung line had to use the transfer gates separating fare areas the MTR and KCR systems. Once the card was placed on a reader, the first section of journey fare would be deducted and passengers could walk over to the other fare area. Passengers who accidentally walked to the wrong area by mistake had to exit the station through the exit gates (not the transfer gates) within 15 minutes, or an extra fare was charged.

1	First Floor	Firemen and staff only (not open to public)
G	Platforms, Exits	Transport interchange
G	Side platform, doors will open on the left
G	Platform 1	Tung Chung line towards Tung Chung (Lai King)
G	Airport Express	Airport Express (does not stop here)
G	Airport Express	Airport Express (does not stop here)
G	Platform 2	← Tung Chung line towards Hong Kong (Olympic)
G	Island platform, doors will open on the left
G	Platform 3	Tuen Ma line towards Tuen Mun (Mei Foo)
G	Wall
G	Platform 4	Tuen Ma line towards Wu Kai Sha (Austin)
G	Side platform, doors will open on the left
C/L1	Concourse	Customer Service Centre, vending machines
C/L1	Concourse	Tickets/fare adjustment, shops, toilets
C/L1	Concourse	vending machines, ATMs

== Entrances and exits ==
- A1: V Walk, Fu Cheong Estate
- A2: V Walk
- B: Cheung Sha Wan Wholesale Food Market
- C: Lin Cheung Road
- D1: Sham Mong Road
- D2: V Walk

== Other transport connections ==
All data has been collected from their respective websites.

Operated by Kowloon Motor Bus:

- 12: Hoi Lai Estate to Tsim Sha Tsui East (Mody Road)
- 12A: Cheung Sha Wan (Hoi Tat Estate) to Whampoa Garden
- 18: Cheung Sha Wan (Hoi Tat Estate) to Oi Man (Circular Route)
- 118: Siu Sai Wan to Cheung Sha Wan (Sham Mong Road) (Northbound Only)
- 118P: Siu Sai Wan to Cheung Sha Wan (Sham Mong Road) (Northbound Only)
- 230R: Kowloon station to Ma Wan (Pak Yan Road)
- N118: Cheung Sha Wan (Sham Mong Road) to Siu Sai Wan

Operated by Citybus:

- 20: Cheung Sha Wan (Hoi Tat Estate) to Kai Tak (Muk On Street)
- 36A: Cheung Sha Wan (Hoi Tat Estate) to Lei Muk Shue (Circular Route)
- 79P: Hong Kong West Kowloon station to Queen's Hill Estate
- 79X: Cheung Sha Wan (Kom Tsun Street) to Queen's Hill Estate
- 701: Hoi Lai Estate to Bute Street (Circular Route)
- 701S: Hoi Lai Estate to Bute Street (Circular Route)
- 702: Hoi Lai Estate to Festival Walk
- 702A: Hoi Ying Estate to Pak Tin Estate
- 702B: Hoi Lai Estate to Pak Tin Estate (Circular Route)
- 914: Hoi Lai Estate to Tin Hau station
- 971: Hoi Lai Estate to Aberdeen (Shek Pai Wan)
- A21: Hung Hom station to Hong Kong International Airport
