= Lai On Estate =

Public housing estate in Sham Shui Po, Hong Kong

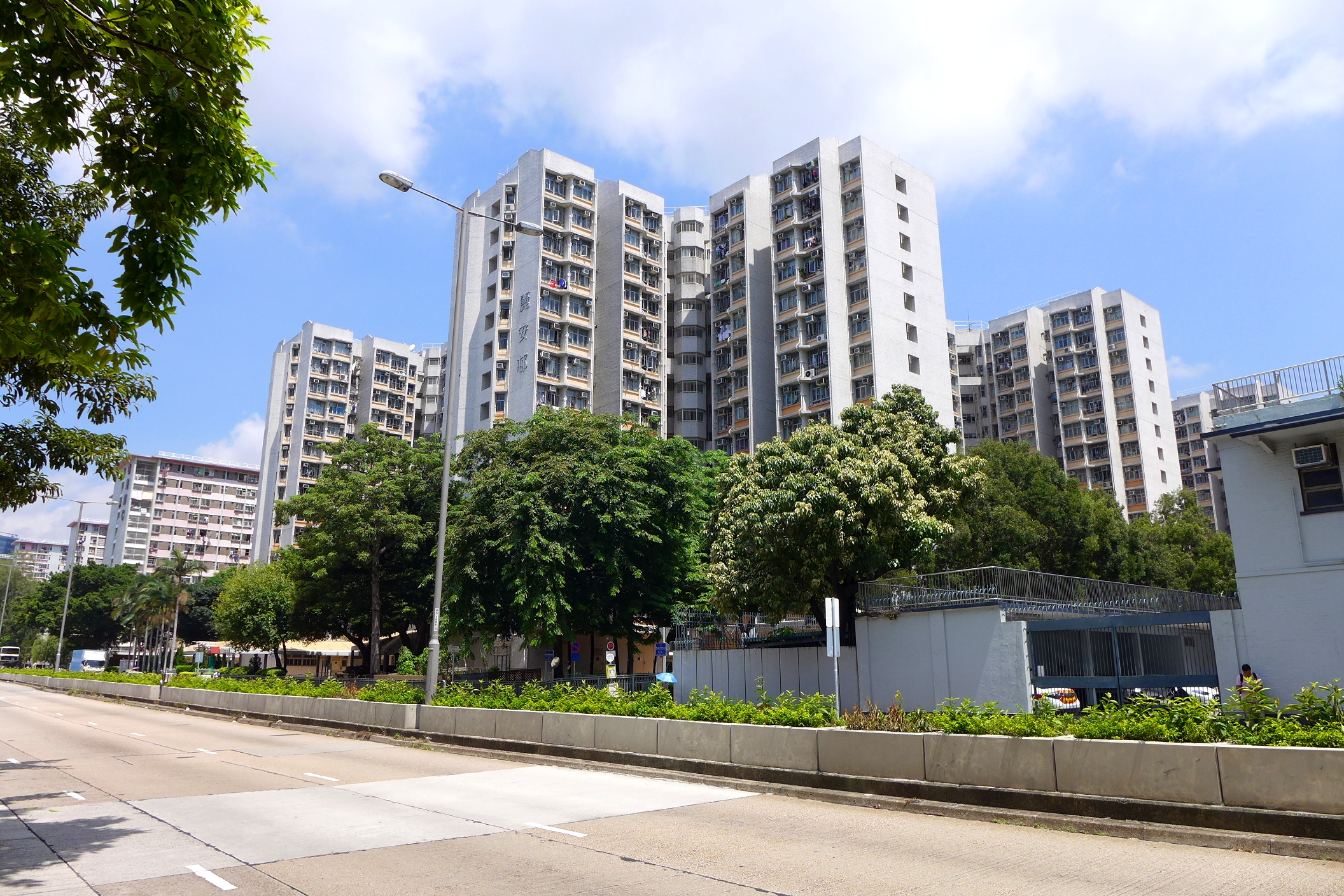
- Lai On Estate
- Interactive map of Lai On Estate

General information
- Location: 420 Lai Chi Kok Road, Sham Shui Po; Kowloon, Hong Kong
- Coordinates: 22.331819°N 114.158860°E
- Status: Completed
- Category: Public rental housing
- Population: 2,957 (2016)
- No. of blocks: 5
- No. of units: 1,400

Construction
- Constructed: 1993; 33 years ago
- Authority: Hong Kong Housing Authority

Lai On Estate (Chinese: 麗安邨) is a public housing estate in Sham Shui Po, New Kowloon, Hong Kong located near Lai Kok Estate, Dragon Centre, and Sham Shui Po station. It consists of 5 residential blocks completed in 1993.

Yee Ching Court (Chinese: 怡靖苑) is a Home Ownership Scheme court in Sham Shui Po, near Lai Kok Estate, Lai On Estate and Dragon Centre. It has 3 blocks built in 1993.

== Background ==
The site where the estate is located was formerly the Sham Shui Po Barracks (Chinese: 深水埗軍營) of the British Army between the 1910s to 1977. During World War II, the barrack was attacked by the Japanese Army and was used as a concentration camp during the Japanese occupation from 1941 to 1945. After the war, the barracks were once again used by British Army until 1977, when they were closed. Part of the site became Lai Kok Estate in 1981 and Sham Shui Po Park in 1983, while another part was a refugee camp for Vietnamese boat people. In 1989, the refugee camp was closed and was partly replaced by Lai On Estate in 1993.

== Houses ==
=== Lai On Estate ===
Name	Chinese name	Building type	Completed
Lai Ching House	麗正樓	Harmony 1A	1993
Lai Lim House	麗廉樓	Harmony 1A	1993
Lai Ping House	麗平樓	Harmony 1A	1993
Lai Tak House	麗德樓	Harmony 1A	1993
Lai Wing House	麗榮樓	Harmony 1A	1993

=== Yee Ching Court ===
Name	Chinese name	Building type	Completed
Han Ching House	閒靜閣	Harmony 1A	1993
Ning Ching House	寧靜閣	Harmony 1A	1993
Yat Ching House	逸靜閣	Harmony 1A	1993

== Demographics ==
According to the 2016 by-census, Lai On Estate had a population of 2,957. The median age was 50.1 and the majority of residents (97 per cent) were of Chinese ethnicity. Cantonese was the usual spoken language of 98.6 per cent of residents (excluding non-speaking persons). The average household size was 2.2 people. The median monthly household income of all households (i.e. including both economically active and inactive households) was HK$11,860.

== Politics ==
Lai On Estate and Yee Ching Court are located in Lai Kok constituency of the Sham Shui Po District Council. It was formerly represented by Li Kwing, who was elected in the 2019 elections until July 2021.

== See also ==
- Public housing estates in Sham Shui Po
