= Long Yiming =

Chinese researcher

Long Yiming (born October 1948) is a Chinese mathematician, and professor at Nankai University. He is a fellow of the Chinese Academy of Sciences.

His research focuses on symplectic geometry, nonlinear functional analysis, celestial mechanics, the variation method, and the Hamiltonian system.

He is a distinguished professor of the Changjiang Scholars Program and the Director-General of the Chinese Mathematical Society.

== Education ==
Between 1978 and 1981, he was a student at Nankai University, where he obtained a master's degree. Between August 1983 and December 1987, he was a student at the University of Wisconsin-Madison, where he received a doctorate degree in mathematics.
