= Fu Cheong Estate =

Public housing estate in Sham Shui Po, Hong Kong

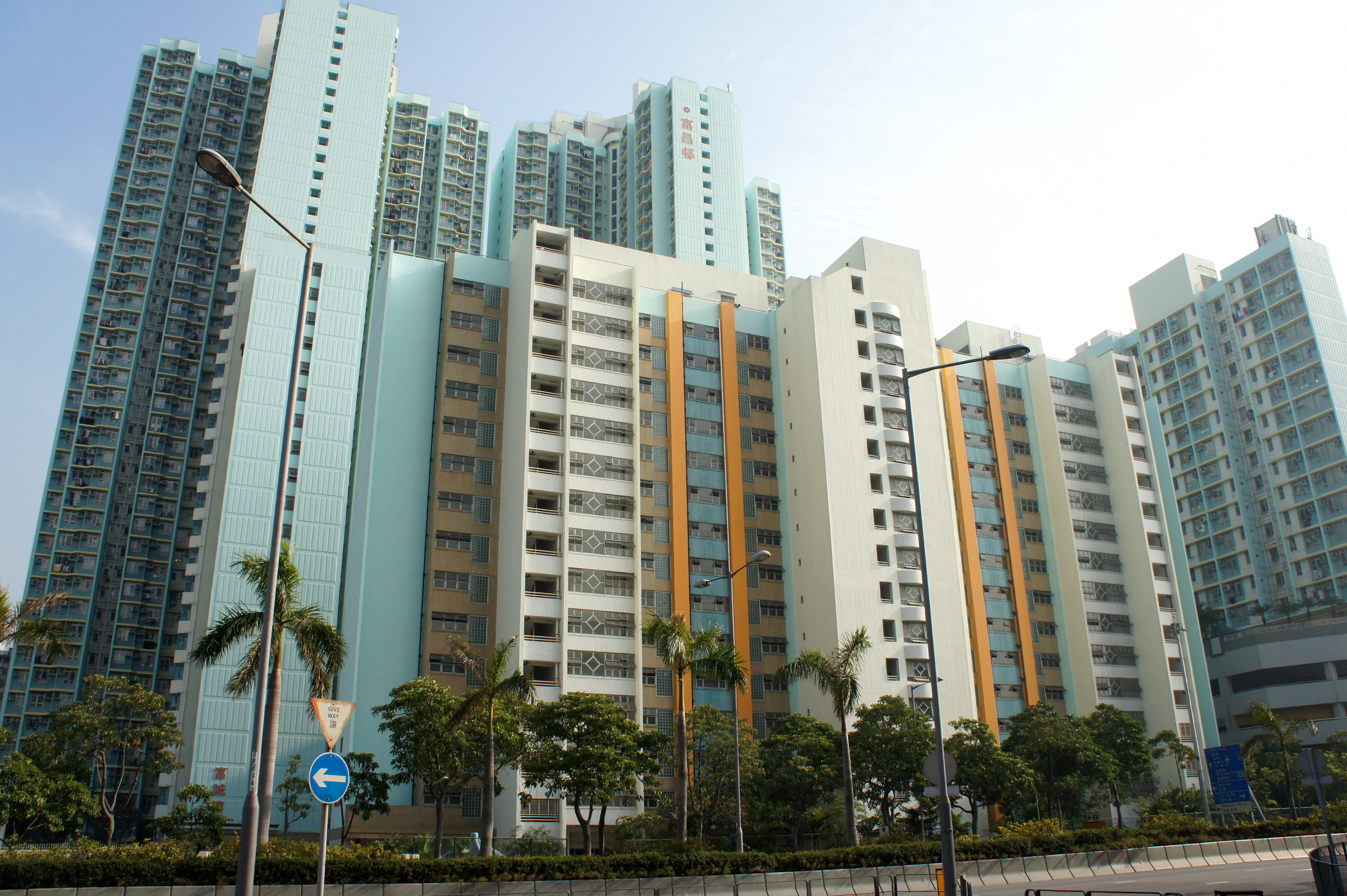
- Fu Cheong Estate
- Interactive map of Fu Cheong Estate

General information
- Location: 19 Sai Chuen Road, Sham Shui Po; Kowloon, Hong Kong
- Coordinates: 22.3286481°N 114.1547018°E
- Status: Completed
- Category: Public rental housing
- Population: 14,900 (2016)
- No. of blocks: 10
- No. of units: 5,874

Construction
- Constructed: 2001; 25 years ago
- Authority: Hong Kong Housing Authority

Fu Cheong Estate (Chinese: 富昌邨) is a public housing estate in Sham Shui Po, Kowloon, Hong Kong, built on the reclaimed land of the southwest of Sham Shui Po near MTR Nam Cheong station. The estate was built in 2001, and it was constructed on the former site of the Sham Shui Po bus terminus. Its name, "Fu Cheong", comes from nearby Nam Cheong Estate and means "Wealthy and Prosperity" in the Chinese language. It consists of 10 residential buildings and a shopping centre completed in 2001 and 2002.

== Houses ==
Name	Chinese name	Building type	Completed
Fu Hoi House	富凱樓	Single Aspect Building	2001
Fu Leung House	富良樓	Single Aspect Building	2001
Fu Yee House	富怡樓	Single Aspect Building	2001
Fu Loy House	富萊樓	Harmony 1	2001
Fu Sing House	富誠樓	Harmony 1	2001
Fu Wong House	富旺樓	Harmony 1	2001
Fu Wen House	富韻樓	Harmony 1	2001
Fu Ying House	富盈樓	Harmony 1	2001
Fu Yuet House	富悅樓	Harmony 1	2002
Fu Yun House	富潤樓	Senior Citizens	2002

== Demographics ==
According to the 2016 by-census, Fu Cheong Estate had a population of 14,900. The median age was 48.2 and the majority of residents (97.7 per cent) were of Chinese ethnicity. The average household size was 2.5 people. The median monthly household income of all households (i.e. including both economically active and inactive households) was HK$20,780.

== Politics ==
Fu Cheong Estate is located in Fu Cheong constituency of the Sham Shui Po District Council. It was formerly represented by Wong Kit-long, who was elected in the 2019 elections until July 2021.

== COVID-19 pandemic ==
Fu Yuet House of the Estate was placed under lockdown for mandatory testing on January 19, 2022.

== See also ==
- Public housing estates in Sham Shui Po
