= James Lung =

- 龍緯汶

Personal details
- Born: 15 August 1974 (age 51)
- Party: Southern Democratic Alliance

James Lung Wai-man (traditional Chinese: 龍緯汶; simplified Chinese: 龙纬文) is the chairman of the Southern Democratic Alliance, a political organisation in Hong Kong.

In mid-May 2019, he was arrested on suspicion of production of child pornography and indecent assault. He was accused of fondling and taking videos of two victims, then aged three and six. In 2020, Lung pleaded guilty to seven offences and was sentenced to 32 months in prison.
