= Wang Cheong Factory Estate =

Industrial building in Hong Kong

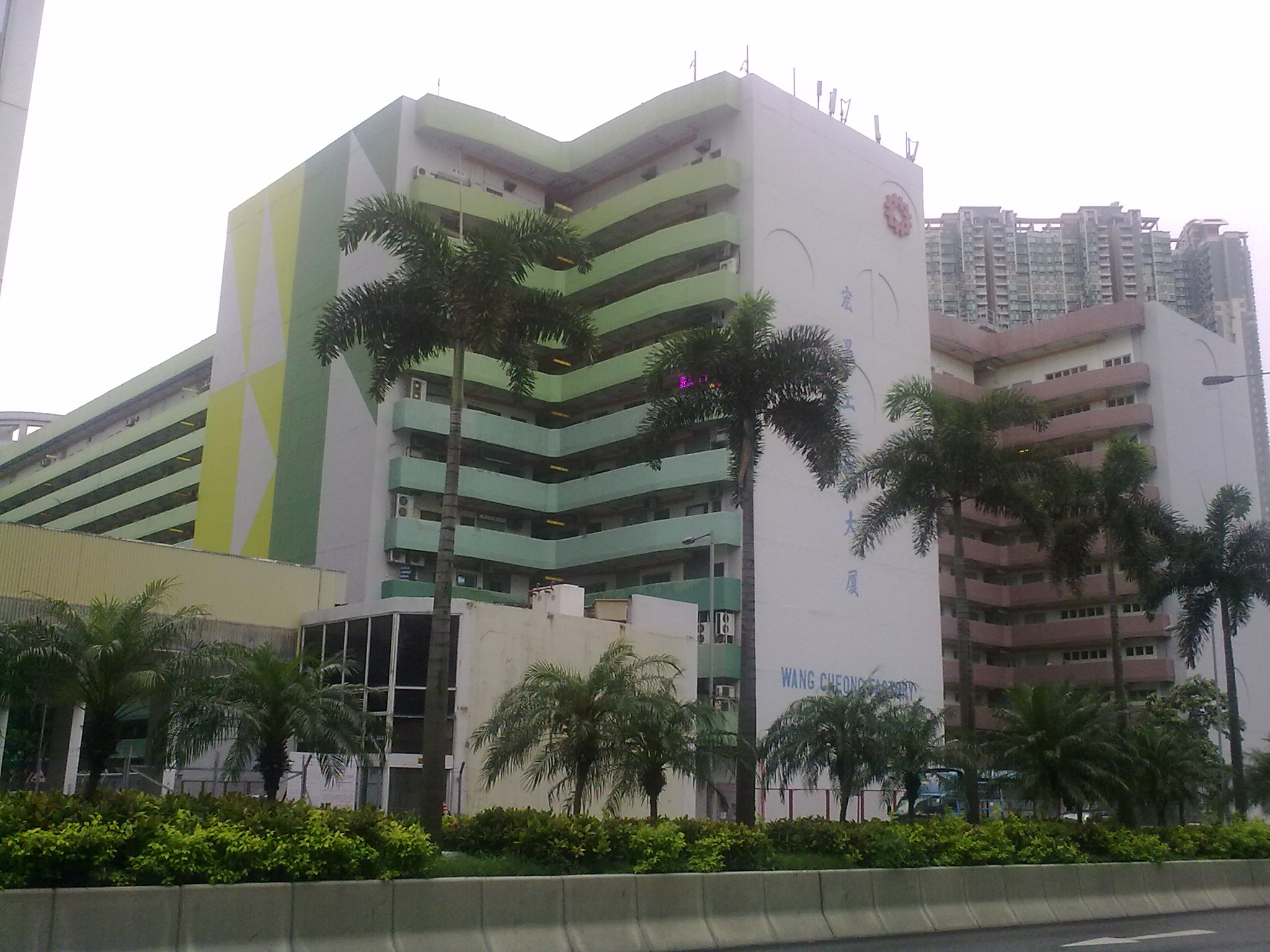
Hung Cheong Factory Building and Hung Cheong Building (the green building on the left and the red building on the right, respectively, 2014)

Wang Cheong Factory Estate is a factory building located in Cheung Sha Wan, Sham Shui Po District, Kowloon, Hong Kong. It is situated at 781 Lai Chi Kok Road and is adjacent to theChangsha Bay Vegetable Wholesale Market Cheung Sha Wan Temporary Poultry Wholesale Market. The estate was completed by the Hong Kong Housing Authority in November 1984. It was the Housing Authority's final factory building project and the first of its developments to use prestressed concrete piles.

The estate originally comprised two 11-storey blocks, known as Tower 1 and Tower 2. Tower 2 was acquired by the former Government Supplies Department for use as its Kowloon headquarters and government supplies warehouse, and was subsequently renamed Wang Cheong Building (783 Lai Chi Kok Road). Tower 1 remained as a rental factory building, providing more than 1,000 small factory units with a total lettable floor area of approximately 26,000 square metres. The tenant mix was diverse, with businesses primarily engaged in engineering, decoration, printing, steamer manufacturing, and the production of paper offerings. To increase the supply of public housing, the government decided to redevelop Tower 1 into flats under the Home Ownership Scheme (HOS), with redevelopment works commencing in January 2023. Tower 2 will be retained.

== Structure ==
Hung Cheong Factory Building (formerly Tower 1) is a multi-storey industrial building equipped with lifts. It is situated near the Cheung Sha Wan Vegetable Wholesale Market and the Cheung Sha Wan Temporary Poultry Wholesale Market. The building is aligned parallel to Hung Cheong Building and Lai Chi Kok Road, and is currently managed directly by the Housing Authority.The building adopts a design similar to that of Kwai On Factory Building in Kwai Chung. In plan view, however, it has an elongated double-cross layout. Lifts are located at the centre of the building and at the ends of both wings, while toilets are situated adjacent to the lift lobbies at either end. The estate management office is located on the ground floor.According to a 2011 report by the Audit Commission of Hong Kong, Hung Cheong Factory Building comprises 11 storeys, provides a lettable floor area of 26,086 square metres, and contains 1,020 units, each measuring approximately 25 square metres.

Hung Cheong Building (formerly Tower 2) formerly served as the Kowloon headquarters of the Government Supplies Department. Covering approximately 28,100 square metres, it was constructed to the same design as Hung Cheong Factory Building.According to the Government Property Agency, the building is now owned by the Hong Kong Special Administrative Region Government and functions as a general office building. All units have been allocated to government departments for long-term use.Several government departments also use parts of the building as storage facilities, including the Architectural Services Department, the Civil Engineering and Development Department, the Environmental Protection Department, and the Highways Department.The Registration and Electoral Office previously established a contingency polling station within one of its storage areas.In addition, the Customs and Excise Department has operated a storage facility and office for seized goods in the building and has conducted auctions of confiscated items there.

== History ==
=== Past ===
Hung Cheong Factory Building was completed by the Hong Kong Housing Authority in November 1984 to provide industrial premises for small and medium-sized enterprises in Cheung Sha Wan and neighbouring districts, addressing the strong demand for small factory units at the time.The Housing Authority’s predecessor, the Resettlement Department, had begun developing resettlement factory estates in 1957 to accommodate family-run industries and small-scale workshops displaced by urban redevelopment. These factory estates, commonly known as “flatted factories”, significantly expanded the supply of government-operated industrial units and supported the growth of many small manufacturers.The site of Hung Cheong Factory Building was located on reclaimed land in Cheung Sha Wan. During the early stages of reclamation in the 1960s, the area was used as a sand depot. In the 1980s, the government designated land south of Lai Chi Kok Road, near the Cheung Sha Wan Vegetable Wholesale Market, for industrial development. Construction of the estate was largely completed by 1984. In July of that year, the Housing Authority distributed promotional materials on the project to approximately 40,000 factory operators through the Census and Statistics Department.

Applications for units in Tower 1 opened shortly afterwards. Monthly rents, inclusive of rates and management fees, ranged from HK$35.5 to HK$67.4 per square metre. Following the removal of restrictions on the number of units a tenant could lease, applicants were permitted to rent multiple units or even entire floors. Applications were processed on a first-come, first-served basis.Public response was strong. On the first day of leasing, more than 400 prospective tenants queued for application forms, while the Housing Authority received over 200 telephone enquiries. According to Housing Authority statistics, 322 units were leased on the first day, followed by 151 and 133 units on the second and third days respectively. A total of 606 units were rented during the first three days, representing approximately 60% of the 1,045 units then available for lease. While most tenants leased a single unit, some rented several units, and a few secured more than half a floor, equivalent to around 70 units.

Following the completion of leasing arrangements, the building was occupied in November 1984. At that time, the Housing Authority’s factory estate portfolio had expanded to 17 buildings, the highest number under its management. However, Hong Kong’s manufacturing sector began relocating to mainland China following the implementation of China’s reform and opening-up policies, leading to a decline in demand for local factory premises. As a result, Hung Cheong Factory Building became the final factory estate project developed by the Housing Authority.The second building, originally designated as Tower 2, was scheduled for completion in February 1985. Although its intended use had not initially been determined, the Housing Authority subsequently sold the completed building to the former Government Supplies Department for use as its Kowloon headquarters and warehouse facilities. The department had previously considered constructing a separate headquarters in Kowloon Bay.The building was later renamed Hung Cheong Building and was therefore never leased as factory premises.In 1989, the Housing Authority reviewed its industrial property portfolio and resolved to gradually divest its factory estates in order to focus resources on public housing development. Following the demolition or disposal of a number of older factory estates, only six factory buildings, including Hung Cheong Factory Building, remained under the Authority’s management.

=== Contemporary ===
Hung Cheong Factory Building (formerly Block 1) is one of the six factory buildings still operated by the Hong Kong Housing Authority. Like the Authority’s other factory estates, it has maintained a consistently high occupancy rate. According to Housing Authority statistics, the building recorded an occupancy rate of approximately 95% in 2020 and accommodated around 490 tenants.According to legislator Fung Kin-kee of the Hong Kong Association for Democracy and People’s Livelihood, the estate housed approximately 500 factory operators and employed around 3,000 workers in 2013. Businesses in the building were diverse and were primarily engaged in light industries, including electronics, electrical and plumbing works. Other tenants operated workshops involved in decoration, printing, food-steaming equipment, and the production of paper offerings. Most factory operators were reportedly over the age of 40 at the time.During the estate’s early years, some units were reportedly used for illegal gambling activities, including unlicensed mahjong parlours. Police conducted a number of enforcement operations within the building and made several arrests. Former actress and writer Mary Jean Reimer later noted in one of her books that certain units were converted into mahjong parlours at night and criticised what she regarded as insufficient oversight by the Housing Authority.In December 2003, an arson attack occurred at an illegal mahjong parlour operating within the building. The perpetrator entered a unit being used as a gambling venue, threatened those present and threw an incendiary device. The resulting fire caused three deaths and eight injuries. The offender was subsequently convicted of manslaughter and sentenced to ten years’ imprisonment.

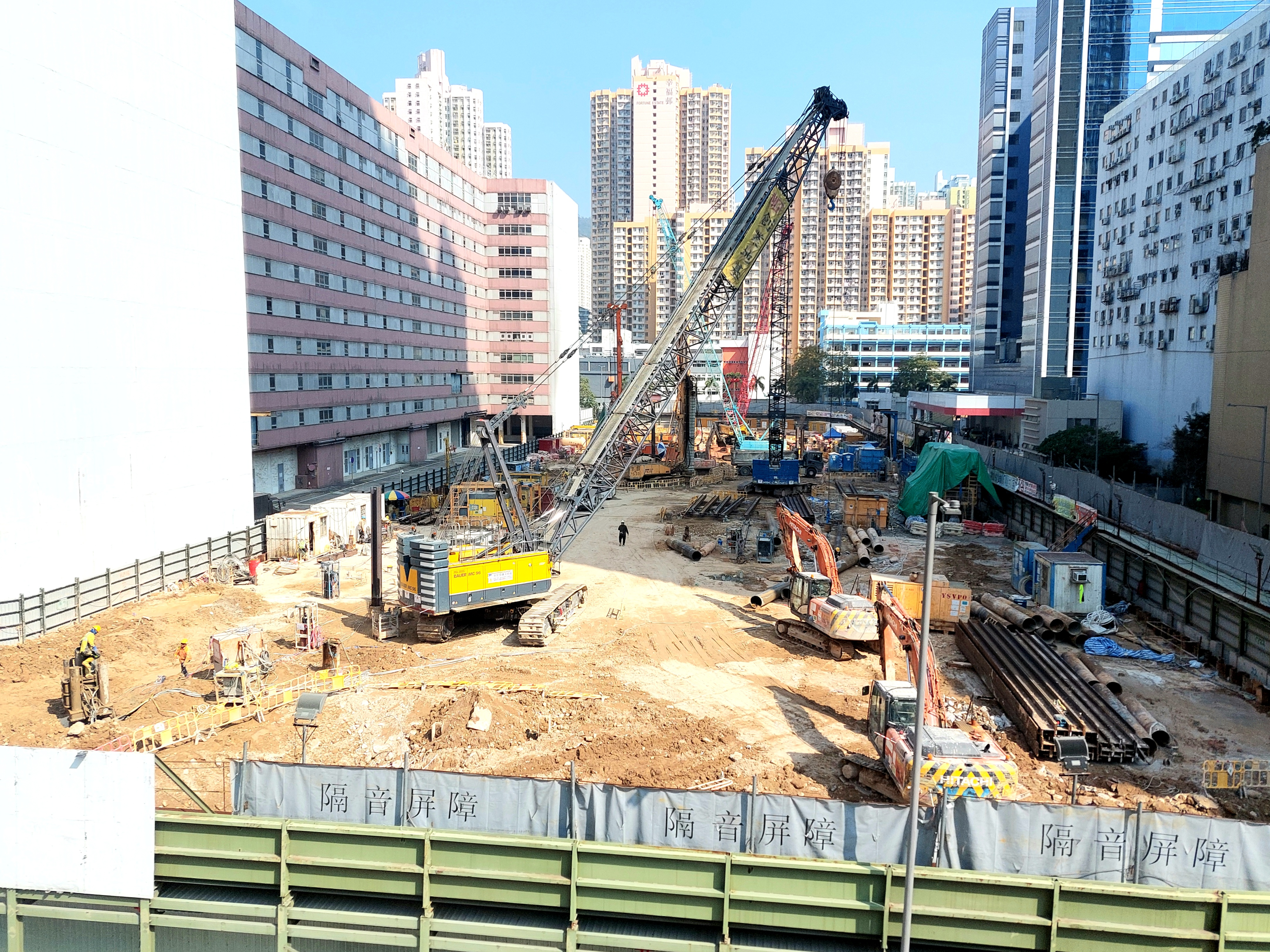
The Hong Cheong Factory Building is being demolished and rebuilt as Home Ownership Scheme housing; foundation work is currently underway (January 2026).

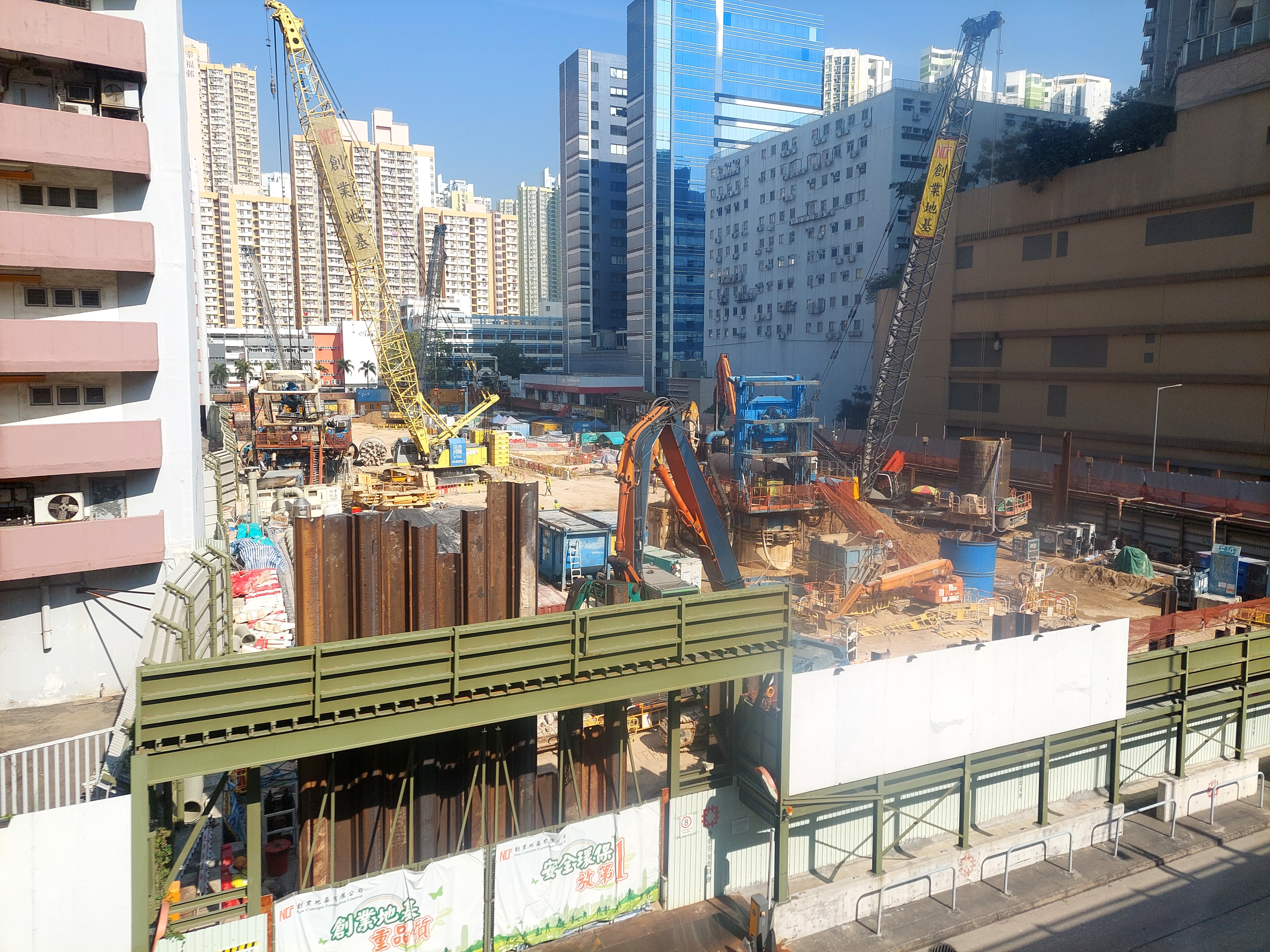
The Hong Cheong Factory Building is being demolished and rebuilt as homestay housing; foundation work is currently underway (December 2024).

Chief Executive Carrie Lam proposedThe Policy Address 2019 and the Policy Address 20202020 Policy Addresses that the Hong Kong Housing Authority consider redeveloping its factory estates for public housing use. Among these, Hung Cheong Factory Building, located near developments such as Lai Tsui Court and Yu Ching Court in West Kowloon, has been identified by media reports as having significant redevelopment potential. It has been suggested that redevelopment of the site could yield at least three residential blocks and more than 1,000 public housing units.As early as 1998, in response to housing demand, the Hong Kong Government rezoned the land occupied by Hung Cheong Factory Building (Block 1) and Hung Cheong Building (Block 2) from industrial to residential use. The Planning DepartmentThe Planning Department consulted the Sham Shui Po Provisional District Council and the public in February and April of that year respectively. No objections were recorded, although it was acknowledged that existing factory operators had not been formally consulted.Following the 2003 arson incident, prosecutors and public figures raised concerns about the site’s management, citing its vacancy rate and operational difficulties, and suggested that it be considered for early redevelopment.

In March 2013, the Town Planning Board amended the zoning of the nearby Asia Golf Club site from “Recreation” to “Residential” use, with plans to redevelop it as part of the second phase of Cheung Sha Wan Estate, now known as Lai Tsui Court. To offset the loss of recreational land, the Board proposed rezoning parts of Hung Cheong Factory Building, Hung Cheong Building, and theCheung Sha Wan Temporary Poultry Wholesale Market site to “Recreation” use. The proposal drew opposition from tenants of Hung Cheong Factory Building, who formed the Hung Cheong Concern Group. They argued that redevelopment would make it difficult to secure affordable alternative industrial premises in the area, potentially leading to job losses and business closures.

The group, together with members of the Democratic Alliance, submitted their concerns to the Town Planning Board in June 2013, requesting that the site retain its industrial zoning. At a subsequent meeting in October on the draft Cheung Sha Wan Outline Zoning Plan, tenant representatives reiterated their opposition to the proposed rezoning. Fung Kin-kee criticised the government for prioritising protection of government-owned facilities in Hung Cheong Building while overlooking the needs of factory tenants. The Housing Authority stated at the time that there were no plans to demolish Hung Cheong Factory Building, and that any change in zoning would not affect its leasing arrangements or day-to-day operations.

Although redevelopment was not implemented in the following years, the government continued to review the future of the site. In August 2019, the government introduced the Fire Safety (Industrial Buildings) Bill, which would require pre-1987 factory buildings such as Hung Cheong to undergo significant upgrading works to meet modern fire safety standards if enacted. In response, the Housing Authority temporarily suspended the leasing of vacant factory units in the same year to minimise disruption to existing tenants and avoid complications for new leases.

In May 2021, the Housing Authority announced the completion of a study proposing the redevelopment of four factory estates, including Sui Fai, Kui An Factory Building,Yean Factory Building Yip On, and Hung Cheong Factory Buildings, into public housing. The proposal involved initiating rezoning procedures for residential use, with an estimated completion of demolition works within approximately 18 months and occupation of new public housing units by 2031.

On 9 November 2021, the Housing Department submitted a redevelopment proposal to the Sham Shui Po District Council, outlining plans to construct two residential blocks providing approximately 1,200 units on the site. Construction was scheduled to commence in January 2023. The feasibility of redeveloping Hung Cheong Building, which continues to be used as a government warehouse, was not included in the study.

== transportation ==
MTR

Tsuen Wan line：Cheung Sha Wan station （Exit B), Lai Chi Kok Station (Exit D4)
