= Eagle's Nest (Hong Kong) =

Hill in Hong Kong

Eagle's Nest, Hong Kong
- 尖山
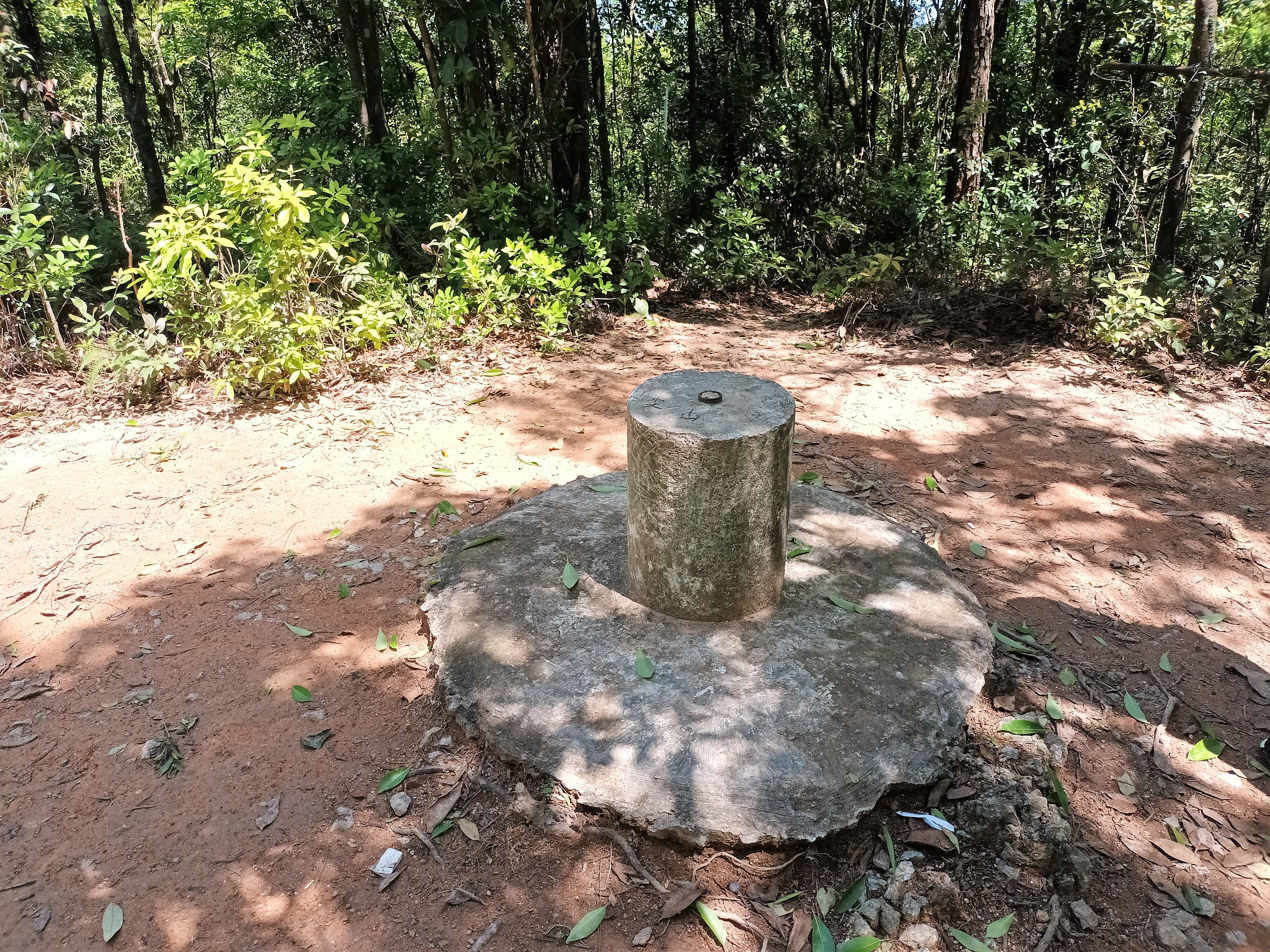
- Trigonometrical station at the summit of Eagle's Nest

Highest point
- Elevation: 305 m (1,001 ft)
- Coordinates: 22°20′47.29″N 114°9′37.43″E

Geography
- Location within Hong Kong
- Location: Hong Kong

Eagle's Nest (Chinese: 鷹巢山), also known indigenously as Tsim Shan (尖山), is a hill north of Cheung Sha Wan of Hong Kong. The hill is located within Lion Rock County Park, and administratively part of Sha Tin District with border to Sham Shui Po District at her south. The hill peaks at 305 metres and is within . The hill is located northeast of Piper's Hill and northwest of Crow's Nest.

== Conservation ==
The steep north face of Beacon Hill, together with a valley to the north-east of Eagle's Nest, covering a total area of 53.2 hectares, was designated as a Site of Special Scientific Interest in 1979.

== Access ==
Eagle's Nest Nature Trail goes around her peak while the Stage 5 of MacLehose Trail runs on her north.

== Transport ==
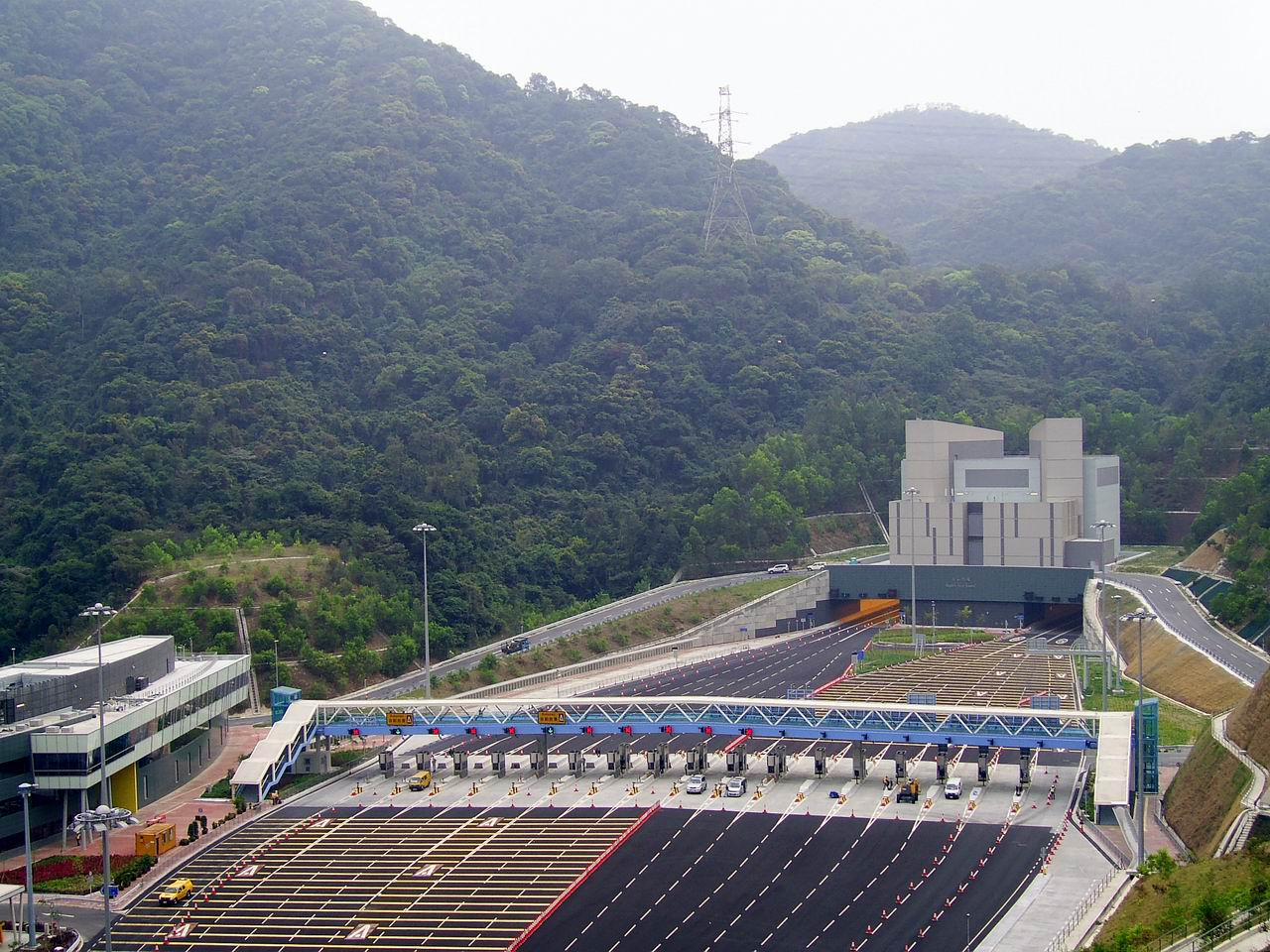
Eagle's Nest Tunnel Sha Tin Entrance

The hill is the site of Eagle's Nest Tunnel, a major infrastructure project in the area.

== See also ==
- List of mountains, peaks and hills in Hong Kong
- Sha Tin Heights
