= Eagle's Nest Tunnel and Sha Tin Heights Tunnel =

Eagle's Nest Tunnel
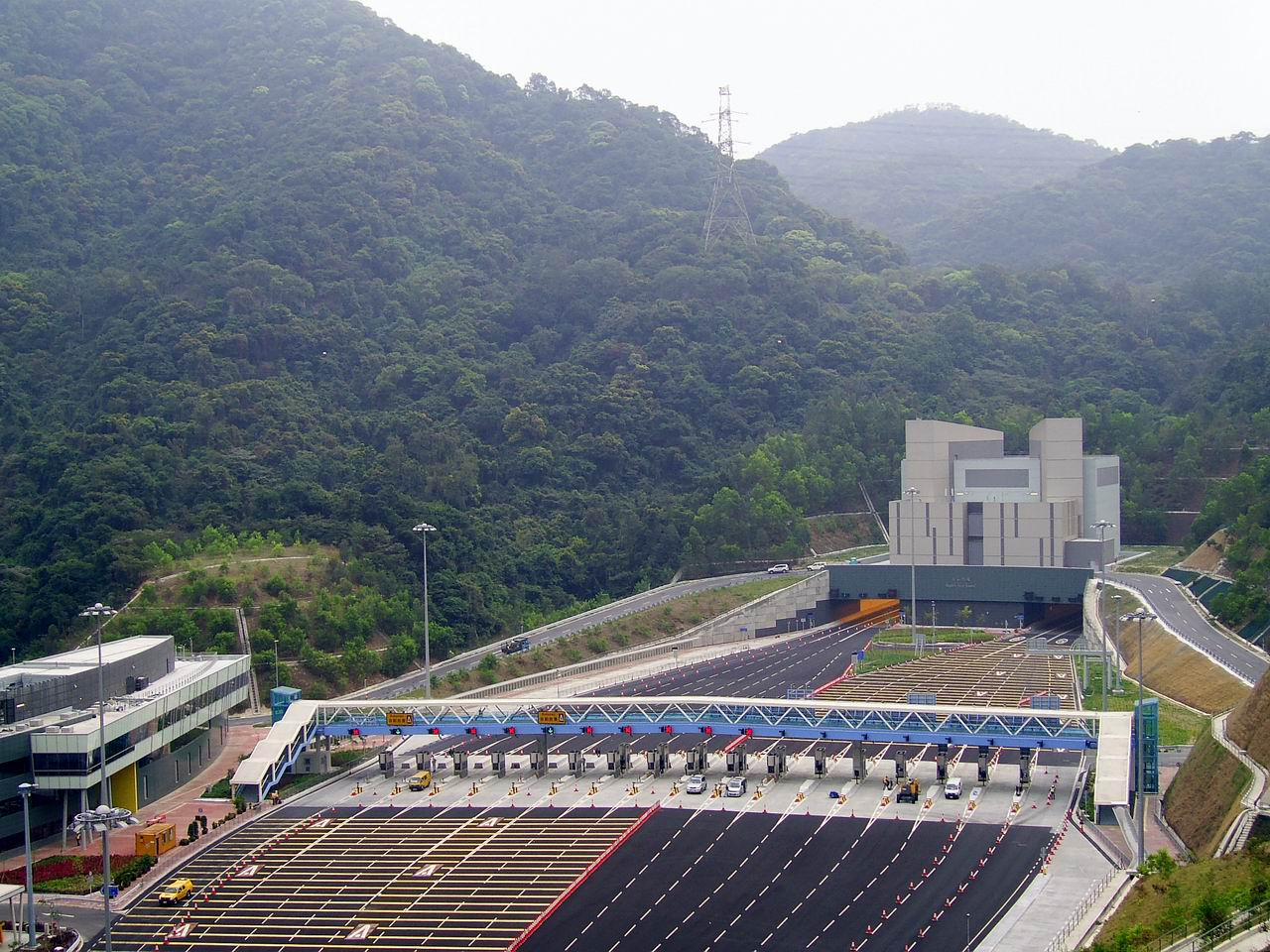
- Toll plaza and north portal of Eagle's Nest Tunnel in March 2008
- Interactive map of Eagle's Nest Tunnel

Overview
- Location: Beneath Eagle's Nest
- Coordinates: 22.3510°N 114.1580°E
- Status: Active
- System: Part of Route 8
- Start: Cheung Sha Wan (Eagle's Nest)
- End: Tai Wai (Eagle's Nest)

Operation
- Opened: 21 March 2008; 18 years ago
- Owner: Hong Kong Government
- Traffic: Vehicular
- Character: Limited access

Technical
- Length: 2.1 kilometres (1.3 mi)
- No. of lanes: 6 lanes (3 lanes per direction)
- Operating speed: 70 kilometres per hour (43 mph)

Eagle's Nest Tunnel
- Chinese: 尖山隧道
Transcriptions
Standard Mandarin
- Hanyu Pinyin: Jiānshān Suìdào
Yue: Cantonese
- Yale Romanization: jīm sāan seuih douh
- Jyutping: zim^{1} saan^{1} seoi^{6} dou^{6}

Sha Tin Heights Tunnel
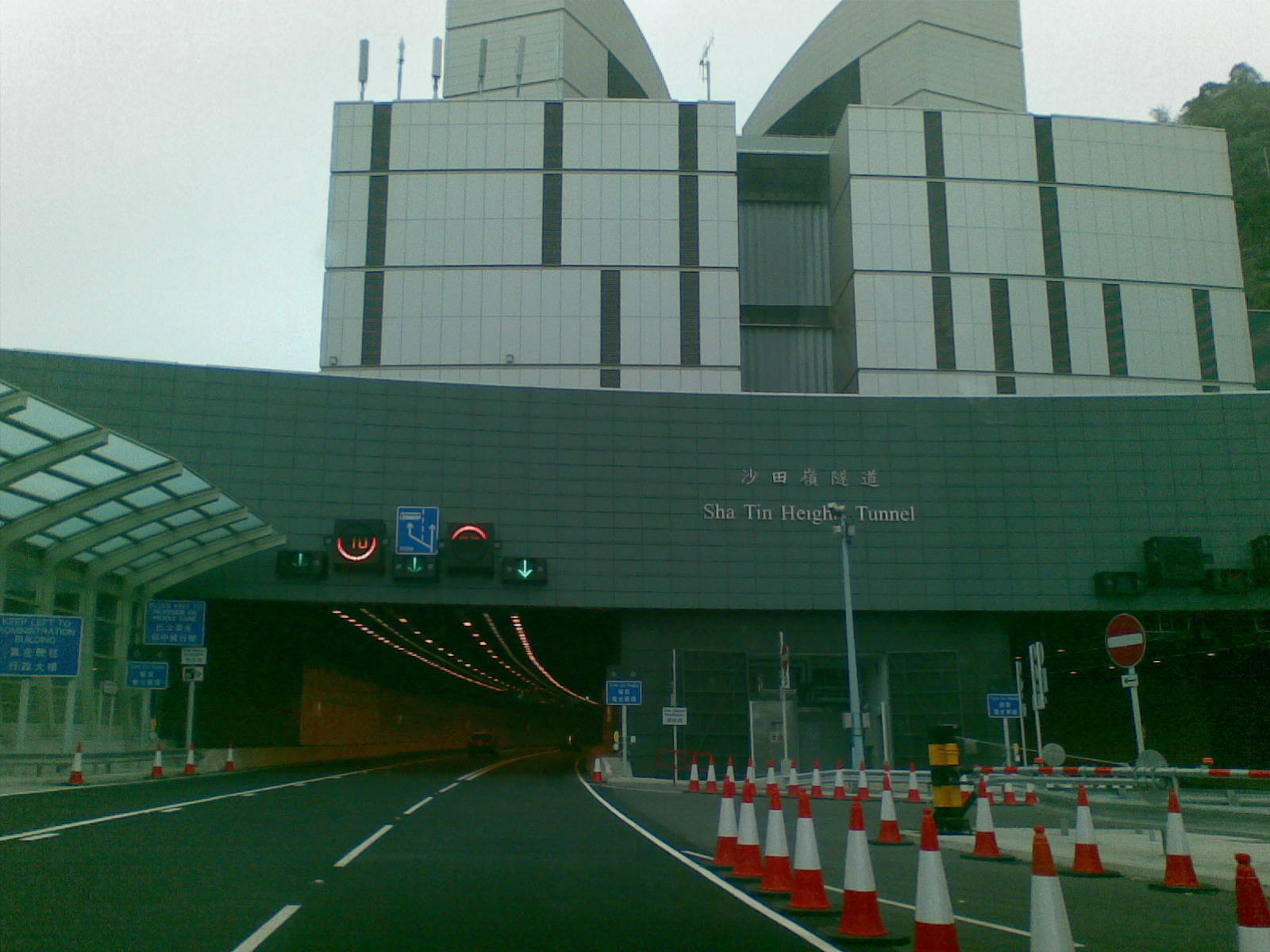
- Northern portal of Sha Tin Heights Tunnel in March 2008
- Interactive map of Sha Tin Heights Tunnel

Overview
- Status: Active
- System: Part of Route 8

Operation
- Opened: 21 March 2008; 18 years ago
- Owner: Hong Kong Government
- Traffic: Vehicular
- Character: Limited access

Technical
- Line length: 0.9 kilometres (0.56 mi)
- No. of lanes: 6 lanes (3 lanes per direction)
- Operating speed: 70 kilometres per hour (43 mph)

Sha Tin Heights Tunnel
- Traditional Chinese: 沙田嶺隧道
- Simplified Chinese: 沙田岭隧道
Transcriptions
Standard Mandarin
- Hanyu Pinyin: Shātiánlǐng Suìdào
Yue: Cantonese
- Yale Romanization: sā tìn léng seui dou
- Jyutping: saa^{1} tin^{4} leng^{5} seoi^{6} dou^{6}

Eagle's Nest Tunnel and Sha Tin Heights Tunnel are road tunnels in the New Territories of Hong Kong. Both tunnels were officially opened on 21 March 2008. The tunnels connect Cheung Sha Wan through Eagle's Nest hills to Tai Wai, and are linked by a shared toll plaza. Eagle's Nest Tunnel is connected at its southern end to Stonecutters Bridge and Ching Cheung Road, whereas Sha Tin Heights Tunnel is linked at the northern end to Che Kung Miu Road and Tai Po Road. The tunnels are part of the Tsing Sha Highway of Route 8, and were constructed in anticipation of future traffic demands generated by development in the northeast New Territories. The combined toll for the two tunnels is HK$8 (for private cars).

== Construction ==
=== Eagle's Nest Tunnel ===
The contract for the construction of the Eagle's Nest Tunnel was awarded to a joint venture between Leighton Asia and Kumagai Gumi. Construction began in October 2003 and the estimated cost of the project is HK$1.84 billion.

The project comprises two 2.1 km, three-lane tunnels from Butterfly Valley to Sha Tin Valley through Eagle's Nest mountain (granite), and all the associated electrical, mechanical and landscaping works that will be necessary. The tunnel was commissioned in March 2008. The full scope of the construction project includes:

- Twin 2.1 km, three-lane tunnels
- 400m ventilation shaft
- North and south tunnel portal buildings
- Ventilation building off Tai Po Road
- Three-storey administration building
- Toll plaza and toll collection facilities (in addition to a footbridge, subway and canopy at the toll plaza)
- 500m tunnel approach road
- Miscellaneous earthworks, road works and landscaping
- Electrical and mechanical (E&M) for both the Eagle's Nest Tunnel and the adjacent, separately constructed, Sha Tin Heights Tunnel

Sandvik Tamrock Corp supplied five new Tamrock Axera tunnelling jumbos for the Eagle's Nest tunnelling project. The first unit is a Tamrock Axera T08, a two-boom jumbo with basket boom and Tamrock Computer Aided Drilling (TCAD) instrumentation. This unit is used at the ventilation shaft and was delivered in April 2004. The remaining four units are all Tamrock Axera T12DATA - three-boom fully computerised jumbos with basket booms. These units were delivered to the site in summer 2004 and are being used in the main tunnel with two units drilling side-by-side for the cross section area of height 11.8m and width 16.3m.

=== Sha Tin Heights Tunnel ===
The Sha Tin Heights Tunnel project involved the construction of 0.9 km of road tunnel and a toll plaza, along with connecting roads to Road T3 and slip roads to Che Kung Miu Road. The project had an estimated cost of HK$1.308 billion. The excavation of the tunnel began in November 2002. The project was undertaken by the Civil Engineering and Development Department (CEDD) in Hong Kong. The project included:

- Site formation, drainage, geotechnical and landscape works for the toll plaza (toll plaza completed in 2004)
- 0.9 km of three-lane twin-bore tunnel underneath Sha Tin Heights
- Dual, two-lane at-grade carriageway of 0.7 km linking the Sha Tin Heights Tunnel and Road T3
- Slip roads connecting to Che Kung Miu Road
- Construction of noise mitigation measures

Preceded by Tai Wai Tunnel	Hong Kong Route 8 Sha Tin Heights Tunnel and Eagle's Nest Tunnel	Succeeded by Tsing Sha Highway
