= Laurence Reynolds =

English footballer

Personal information
- Full name: Laurence Christian Reynolds
- Date of birth: 4 March 1992 (age 34)
- Position: Midfielder

Senior career*
Years	Team	Apps	(Gls)
2021–2022	HKFC	0	(0)
- * Club domestic league appearances and goals as of 19 December 2021

Laurence Christian Reynolds (born 5 March 1992) is an English professional footballer who is a free agent. He worked as a full-time school teacher at Po Leung Kuk Choi Kai Yau School. As of 21 July 2022, he resides in Manchester, his hometown.

== Career statistics ==
=== Club ===
As of 19 December 2021

Appearances and goals by club, season and competition
Club	Season	League			Cup		League Cup		Total	
Club	Season	Division	Apps	Goals	Apps	Goals	Apps	Goals	Apps	Goals
HKFC	2021–22	Premier League	0	0	0	0	1 (Note: Appearances in the Sapling Cup)	0	1	0
