= Cheung Sha Wan Road =

Road in Kowloon, Hong Kong

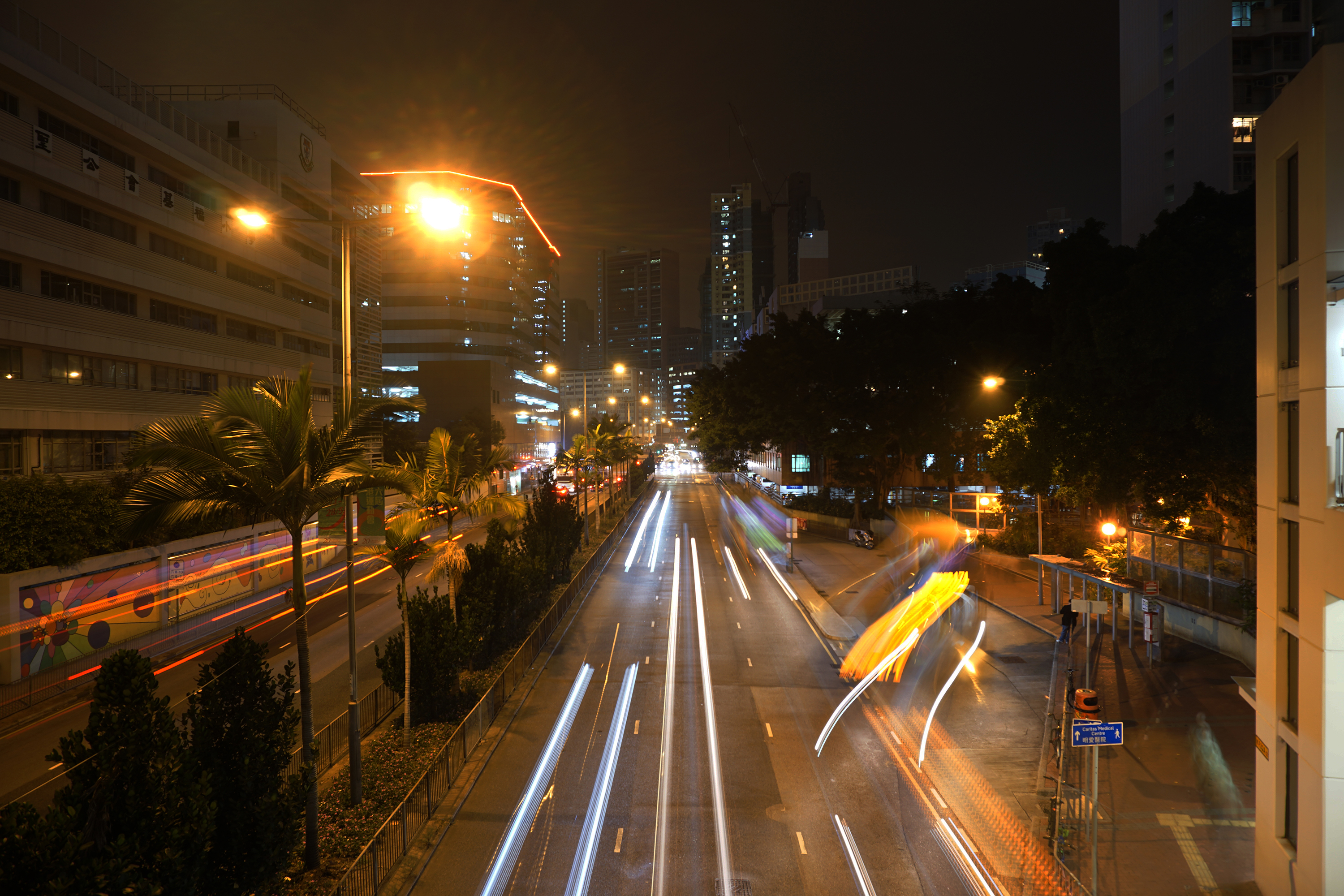
- Cheung Sha Wan Road near Sheng Kung Hui Kei Fook Primary School
- Interactive map of Cheung Sha Wan Road
- Native name: 長沙灣道 (Chinese)
- Namesake: Cheung Sha Wan
- Length: 3.4 km (2.1 mi)
- Location: Kowloon, Hong Kong
- Coordinates: 22°20′7.4718″N 114°9′22.8024″E
- South end: Mong Kok
- North end: Lai Chi Kok

Cheung Sha Wan Road
- Traditional Chinese: 長沙灣道
- Simplified Chinese: 长沙湾道
Transcriptions
Standard Mandarin
- Hanyu Pinyin: Chángshāwān Dào
Yue: Cantonese
- Jyutping: coeng4 saa1 waan4 dou6

Cheung Sha Wan Road (Chinese: 長沙灣道; Jyutping: coeng4 saa1 waan4 dou6) is a main thoroughfare in Kowloon, Hong Kong going in a south-north direction from Mong Kok in the south to Lai Chi Kok in the north.

== Description ==
It starts in Mong Kok near Boundary Street and at the northern terminus of Nathan Road. It then passes through Sham Shui Po and Cheung Sha Wan whilst intersecting with major roads, including Nam Cheong Street, Yen Chow Street and Tonkin Street, in that order. It ends at Kwai Chung Road, part of Route 5, in Lai Chi Kok. There is also an exit ramp in the northern terminus to Castle Peak Road.

A section of the Tsuen Wan line (Lai Chi Kok, Cheung Sha Wan and Sham Shui Po stations) runs underneath the Road. Cheung Sha Wan Road is about 3.4 kilometres (2.1 mi) in length, with a uniform speed limit of 50 kilometres per hour (31 mph).

In 2017, the busiest section of the road was from Kom Tsun Street to Tung Chau West Street, with 54,300 vehicles traveling on it. It is measured in average annual daily traffic (AADT), which measures the amount of traffic daily on average. The road is classified as a Primary Distributor (PD) by the Transport Department.

== History ==
The road was named Cheung Sha Wan Road on 28 September 1923 as it then terminated near the sea in Cheung Sha Wan before reclamation. Later, the road was extended several times in the 1950s to Lai Chi Kok.

In 1963, a fire occurred at Fuk Wah Village near Cheung Sha Wan Road, rendering its residents homeless.

== Notable structures ==
As Cheung Sha Wan Road passes through industrial areas like Cheung Sha Wan, various factory buildings can be found along it. Other structures located along the street include:

- Un Chau Estate – between Un Chau Street and Cheung Sha Wan Road
- Sham Shui Po Sports Ground
- Cheung Sha Wan Plaza

== See also ==
- List of streets and roads in Hong Kong
