= Cheung Sha Wan Plaza =

Shopping centre in Cheung Sha Wan, Hong Kong

Coordinates: 22.33710°N 114.14867°E

- Traditional Chinese: 長沙灣廣場
- Simplified Chinese: 长沙湾广场
- Cantonese Yale: chēuhng sā wāhn gwóng chēuhng
Transcriptions
Standard Mandarin
- Hanyu Pinyin: Chángshāwān Guǎngchǎng
Yue: Cantonese
- Yale Romanization: chēuhng sā wāhn gwóng chēuhng
- Jyutping: coeng4 sa1 waan1 gwong2 coeng4

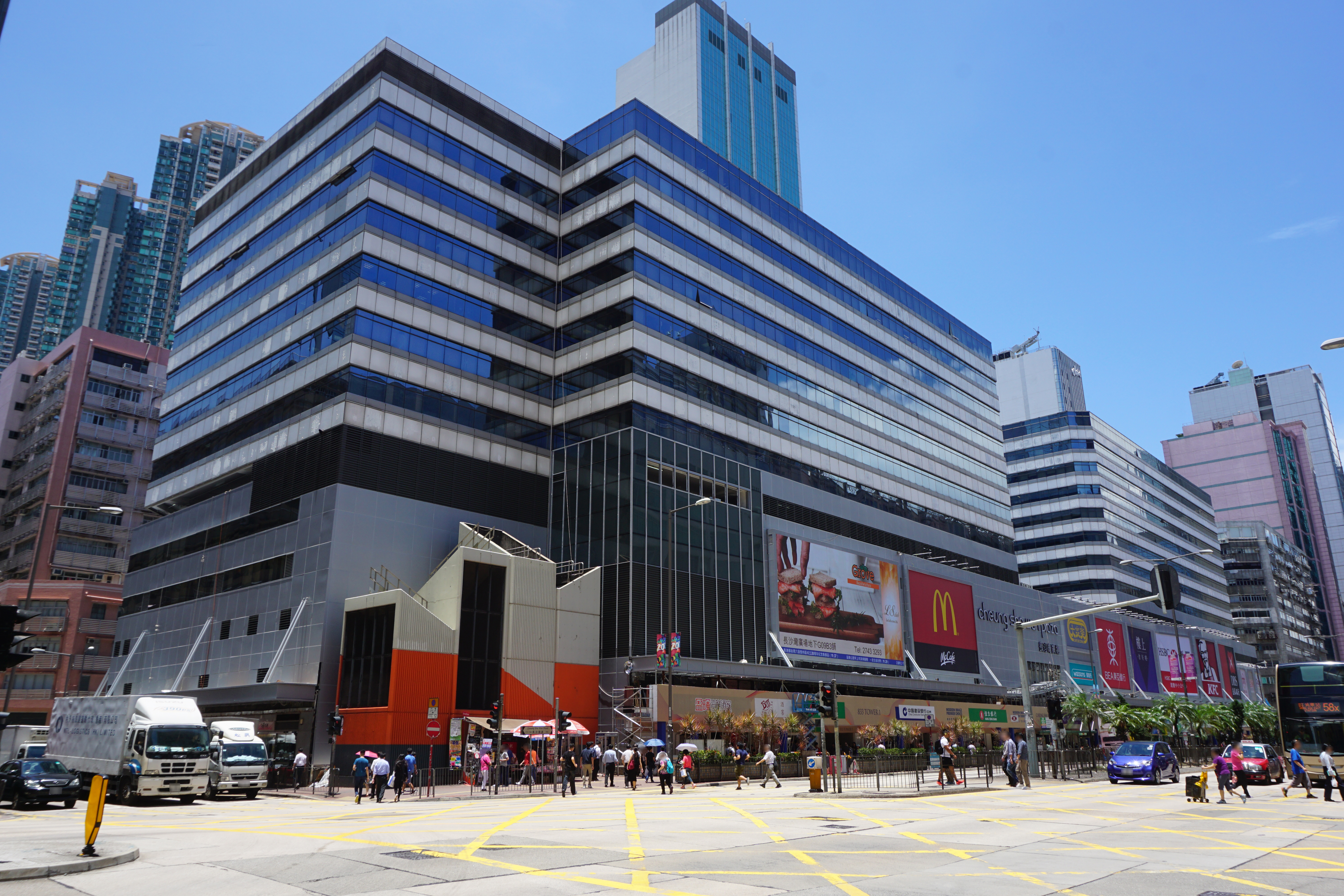
Cheung Sha Wan Plaza along Cheung Sha Wan Road.

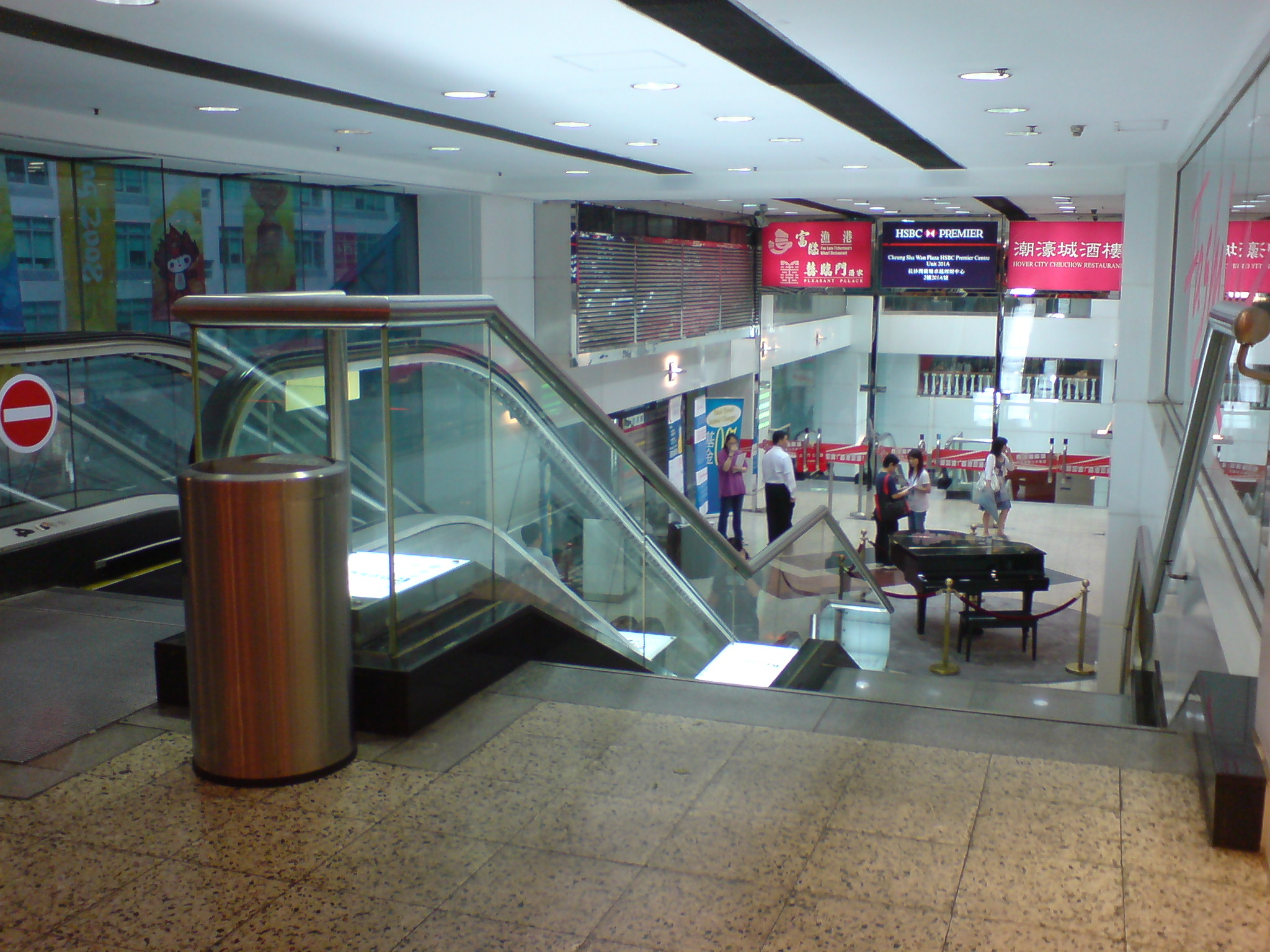
Escalator at the first floor in Cheung Sha Wan Plaza.

Cheung Sha Wan Plaza (Chinese: 長沙灣廣場; Cantonese Yale: chēuhng sā wāhn gwóng chēuhng, Jyutping: coeng4 saa1 waan1 gwong2 coeng4) is shopping centre and office complex in Cheung Sha Wan, New Kowloon, Hong Kong. It was developed by Lai Sun Development in 1989. It is erected over MTR Lai Chi Kok station, consisting of a bus terminus, multi-storey car parks, a commercial/retail podium and two office towers.
