= Po Leung Kuk Choi Kai Yau School =

International school in Hong Kong

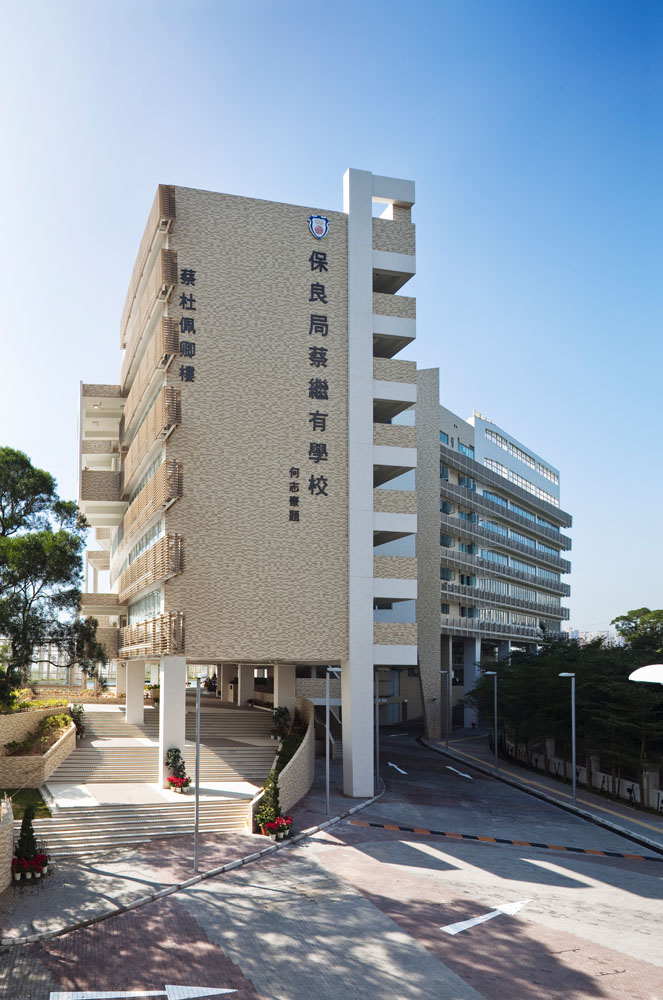
- The school viewed from the east

Location
- 6 Caldecott Rd, Piper's Hill, Hong Kong; 6 Caldecott Road, Piper's Hill, Kowloon, Hong Kong; 22.344632°N 114.148394°E

Information
- Type: Private Independent Secondary and Primary School, co-educational International Baccalaureate
- Motto: In this school, every child is good at something.
- Established: 2002
- Principal: Lau Siu Ling (Founding Principal), Jenny Chong (Head Principal)
- Grades: Years 1–12
- Enrollment: 1679 (2013-14)
- Website: cky.edu.hk

Po Leung Kuk Choi Kai Yau School (Chinese: 保良局蔡繼有學校, abbreviated PLKCKY) is a private independent school for boys and girls aged 6–18, ranging from primary through to International Baccalaureate (IB) diploma students situated in Sham Shui Po.

== History ==
The school was founded in 2002, with its first campus in Tin Hau. The current site was previously occupied by the Sir Robert Black College of Education as a teacher training college. In September 2009, the school was moved to a new campus on Piper's Hill designed by Andrew Lee King Fun and Associates Architects Limited (ALKF), with its design built to resemble a fan shape.

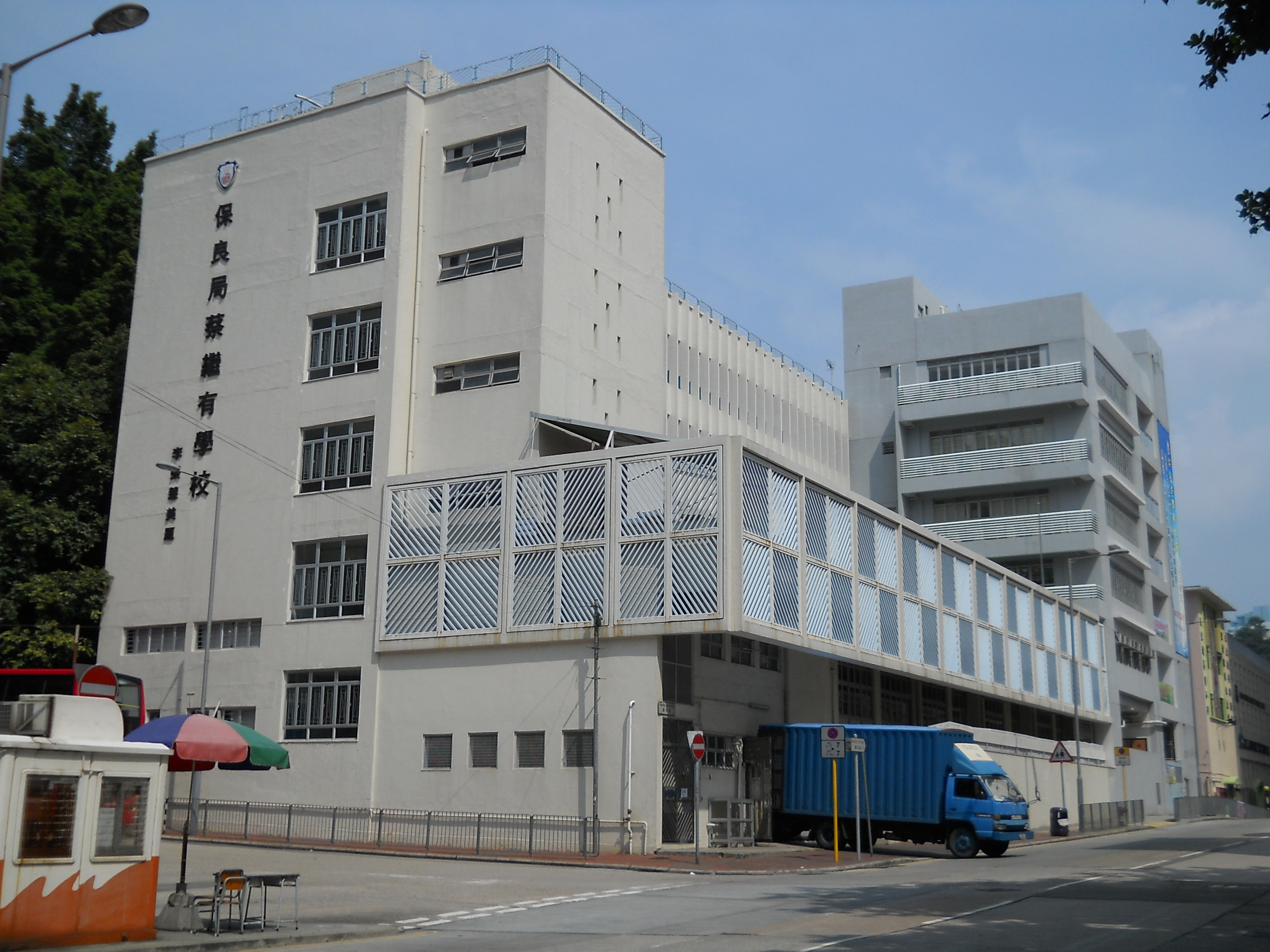
The old campus

== Structure ==
This school is divided into primary and secondary sections, in which primary consists of 5 years while secondary has 7 years. This is different to many schools (especially local schools). This has been explained by the founding principal, saying, "We want to let students have a secondary experience earlier on." The teacher to student ratio is 1:10. Approximately 60% of teachers at PLKCKY are western, while the other 40% are Chinese.

== Academics ==
In 2025, 52% of students achieved 40 points of above in the IB, and 72% achieved IGCSE grades of A*-A.

== Notable alumni ==
- Gareth.T
