= Crow's Nest (Hong Kong) =

Hill in Hong Kong

- 鴉巢山
- Location within Hong Kong

Highest point
- Elevation: 194 m (636 ft)
- Coordinates: 22.3477771°N 114.1580552°E

Geography
- Location: Hong Kong

Crow's Nest (Chinese: 鴉巢山) is a hill north of So Uk in Cheung Sha Wan of New Kowloon in Hong Kong. It has a height of 194 metres (636 feet) and is located south of Eagle's Nest. It is one of the Eight Mountains of Kowloon.

Lung Cheung Road and Tai Po Road are found on its southern slope. On the eastern side of the hill, there are three private housing estates: Dynasty Heights, Skylodge and Tropicana. Lei Cheng Uk Estate, a public housing estate rebuilt during the 1980s, is at the southern foot of the hill. Its western slope is mainly given over to cultivation.

== See also ==
- Geography of Hong Kong
- List of mountains, peaks and hills in Hong Kong
- Eagle's Nest (Hong Kong)
- Beacon Hill Tunnel
- Lion Rock
- MacLehose Trail
