= Hoi Lai Estate =

Public housing estate in Cheung Sha Wan, Hong Kong

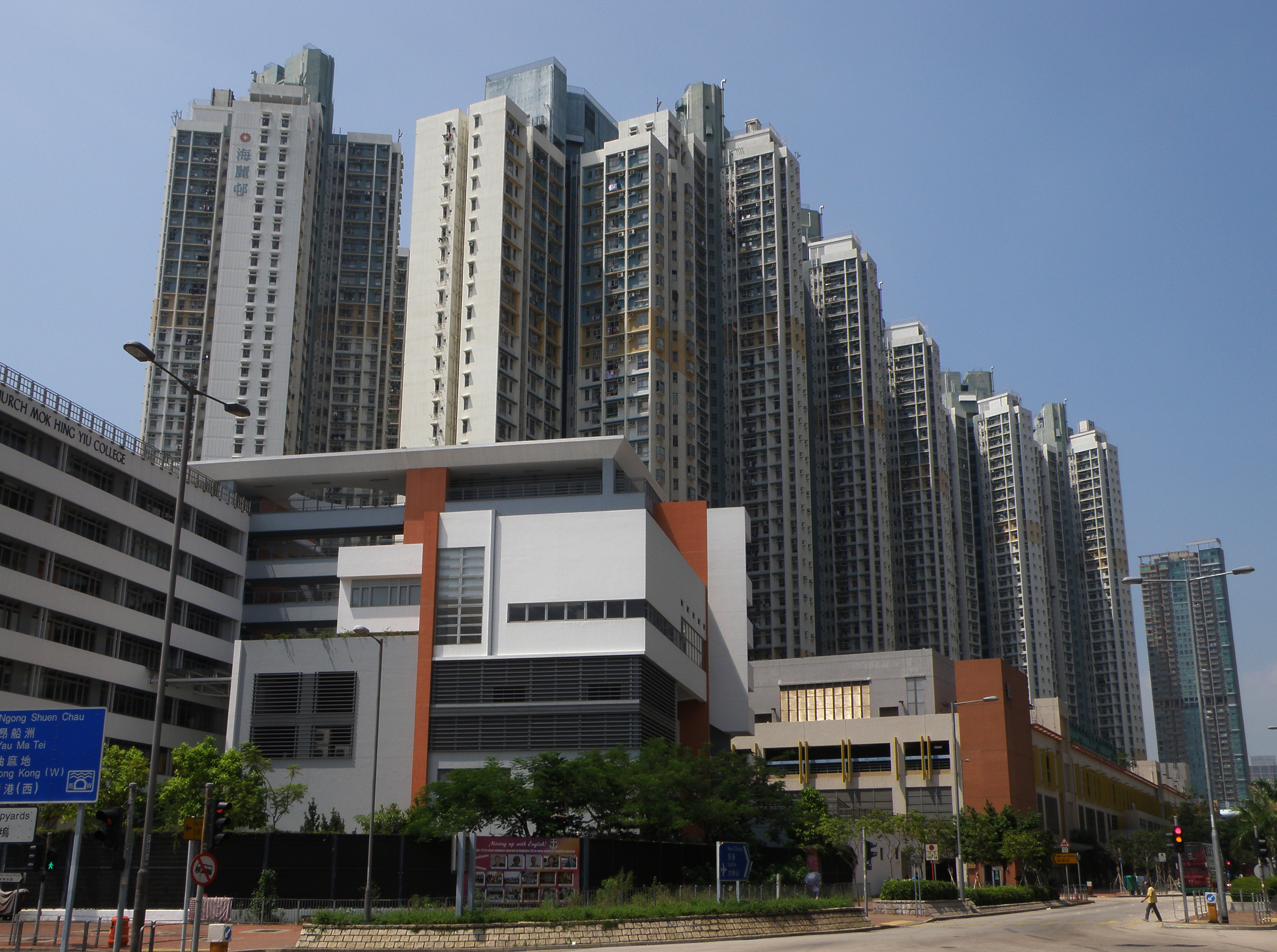
- Hoi Lai Estate
- Interactive map of Hoi Lai Estate

General information
- Location: 100 Sham Mong Road, Cheung Sha Wan; Kowloon, Hong Kong
- Coordinates: 22.3321151°N 114.1463783°E
- Status: Completed
- Category: Public rental housing
- Population: 16,901 (2016)
- No. of blocks: 12
- No. of units: 4,908

Construction
- Constructed: 2004; 22 years ago
- Authority: Hong Kong Housing Authority

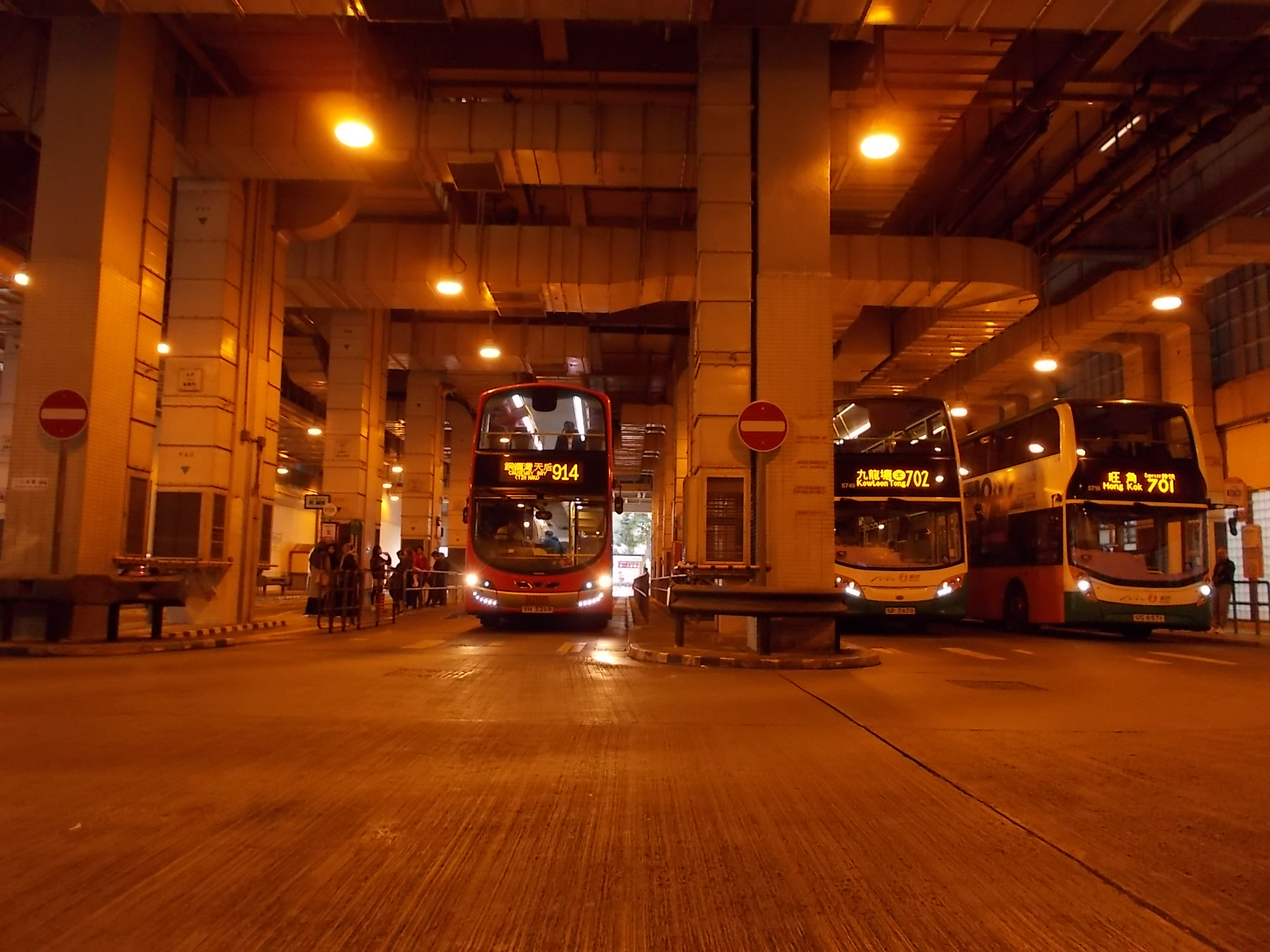
Hoi Lai Bus Terminus

Hoi Lai Estate (Chinese: 海麗邨) is a public housing estate in Cheung Sha Wan, Kowloon, Hong Kong, built on the reclaimed land of south Cheung Sha Wan, near Lai Chi Kok station and four private housing estates, namely Aqua Marine, Banyan Garden, Liberté and The Pacifica. The estate consists of 12 residential buildings and a shopping centre completed between 2004 and 2005. It was planned for HOS court, but it was changed to rental housing before it was occupied.

== Houses ==
| Name | | Building type | Completed |
|---|---|---|---|
| Hoi Ming House | 海明樓 | New Cruciform (Ver.1999) | 2004 |
| Hoi Ching House | 海晴樓 | New Cruciform (Ver.1999) | 2004 |
| Hoi Fai House | 海暉樓 | New Cruciform (Ver.1999) | 2004 |
| Hoi Yin House | 海賢樓 | New Cruciform (Ver.1999) | 2004 |
| Hoi Shun House | 海信樓 | New Cruciform (Ver.1999) | 2004 |
| Hoi Nga House | 海雅樓 | New Cruciform (Ver.1999) | 2004 |
| Hoi Hei House | 海禧樓 | New Cruciform (Ver.1999) | 2004 |
| Hoi Kin House | 海健樓 | New Cruciform (Ver.1999) | 2004 |
| Hoi Wo House | 海和樓 | New Cruciform (Ver.1999) | 2004 |
| Hoi Chi House | 海智樓 | New Cruciform (Ver.1999) | 2004 |
| Hoi Wai House | 海慧樓 | New Cruciform (Ver.1999) | 2004 |
| Hoi Shui House | 海瑞樓 | Non-standard | 2005 |

== Demographics ==
According to the 2016 by-census, Hoi Lai Estate had a population of 16,901. The median age was 38.8 and the majority of residents (96.9 per cent) were of Chinese ethnicity. The average household size was 3.5 people. The median monthly household income of all households (i.e. including both economically active and inactive households) was HK$27,640.

== Politics ==
Hoi Lai Estate is located in Lai Chi Kok South constituency of the Sham Shui Po District Council. It was formerly represented by Yeung Yuk, who was elected in the 2019 elections until July 2021.

== See also ==
- Public housing estates in Cheung Sha Wan
