= Cheung Sha Wan station =

MTR station in Kowloon, Hong Kong

Cheung Sha Wan 長沙灣
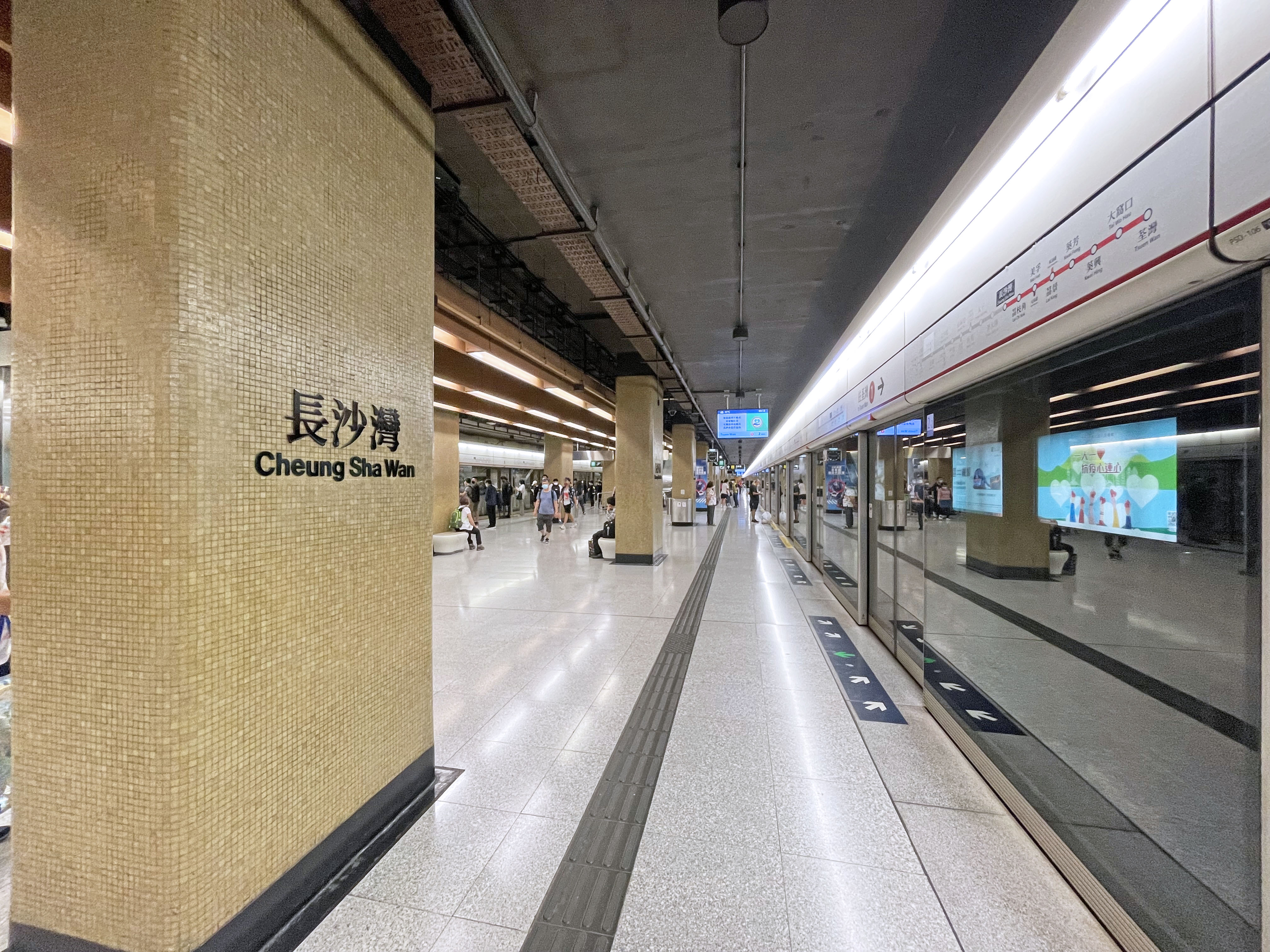
- Platform 1

Chinese name
- Traditional Chinese: 長沙灣
- Simplified Chinese: 长沙湾
- Cantonese Yale: Chèungsāwàan
- Literal meaning: Long Sands Bay
Transcriptions
Standard Mandarin
- Hanyu Pinyin: Chángshāwān
Yue: Cantonese
- Yale Romanization: Chèungsāwàan
- Jyutping: Coeng4saa1waan4

General information
- Location: Cheung Sha Wan Road near Cheung Sha Wan Playground, Cheung Sha Wan; Sham Shui Po District; Hong Kong
- Coordinates: 22°20′07″N 114°09′23″E
- System: MTR rapid transit station
- Operator: MTR Corporation
- Line: Tsuen Wan line
- Platforms: 2 (1 island platform)
- Tracks: 2
- Connections: Bus, minibus

Construction
- Structure type: Underground
- Platform levels: 1
- Accessible: yes

Other information
- Station code: CSW

History
- Opened: 17 May 1982; 44 years ago
- Former names: Un Chau

Services
Preceding station	MTR	Following station
Sham Shui Po towards Central	Tsuen Wan line	Lai Chi Kok towards Tsuen Wan
Track layout
Location
- Location within MTR

Cheung Sha Wan (Chinese: 長沙灣) is an MTR station on the Tsuen Wan line. It is located underneath Cheung Sha Wan Road in Sham Shui Po District. It was opened on 17 May 1982. The station's colour scheme is yellow and brown.

The station was originally planned with the name So Uk (蘇屋), and the station is close to the Lei Cheng Uk Han Tomb Museum.

== History ==
On 10 May 1982, the Tsuen Wan line opened to the public, but Cheung Sha Wan station did not open to the public until 17 May, a week later. The contractor is Nishimatsu Construction.

== Station layout ==
U1	Podium level	Lift to Exit A3
G	Ground level	Exits
L1	Concourse	Customer Service, MTRShops
L1	Concourse	Vending machine, ATMs
L2; Platforms	Platform 2	Tsuen Wan line towards Central (Sham Shui Po) →
L2; Platforms	Island platform, doors will open on the right
L2; Platforms	Platform 1	← Tsuen Wan line towards Tsuen Wan (Lai Chi Kok)

== Entrances/Exits ==
- A1: Cheung Sha Wan Road
- A2: Tonkin Street
- A3: Tonkin Street, Lei Cheng Uk Han Tomb Museum, Cheung Sha Wan Estate
- B: Fat Tsueng Street, Cheung Sha Wan Playground, IVE (WHK)
- C1: Wing Lung Street
- C2: Un Chau Estate
