= Sha Tin Heights =

- 沙田嶺
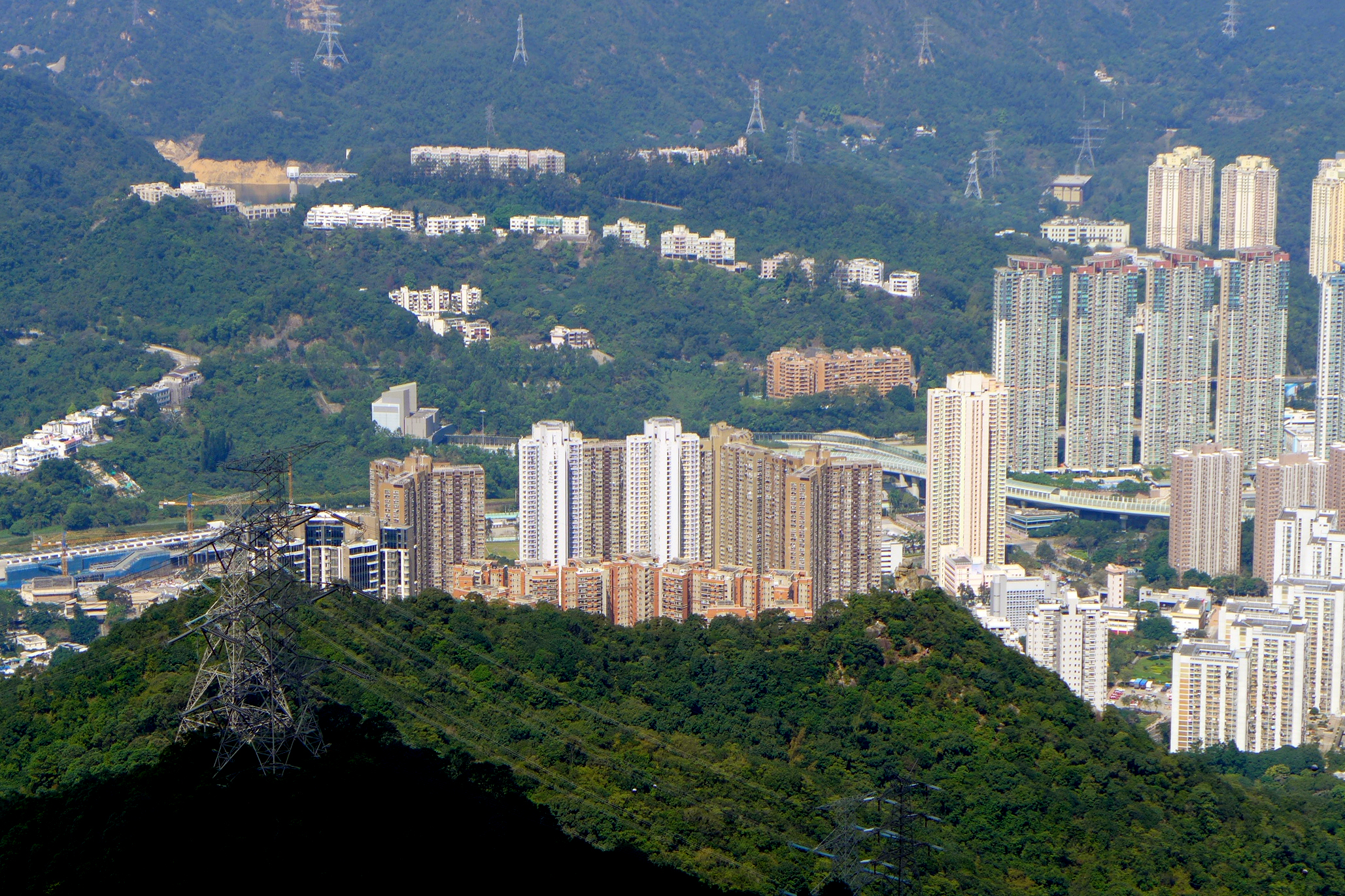
- Sha Tin Heights and surrounding area

Highest point
- Elevation: 160 m (520 ft)
- Coordinates: 22°22′03″N 114°10′01″E

Geography
- Location within Hong Kong
- Location: Sha Tin, Hong Kong

Sha Tin Heights (Chinese: 沙田嶺) is a 160 metres (525 ft) tall hill located in Tai Wai, Sha Tin District, in Hong Kong's New Territories.

== Residential area ==
The Sha Tin Heights area is located close to Kam Shan Country Park. Currently, this area primarily consists of upmarket residences, concentrating on the two sides of Sha Tin Heights Road.

== Transport ==
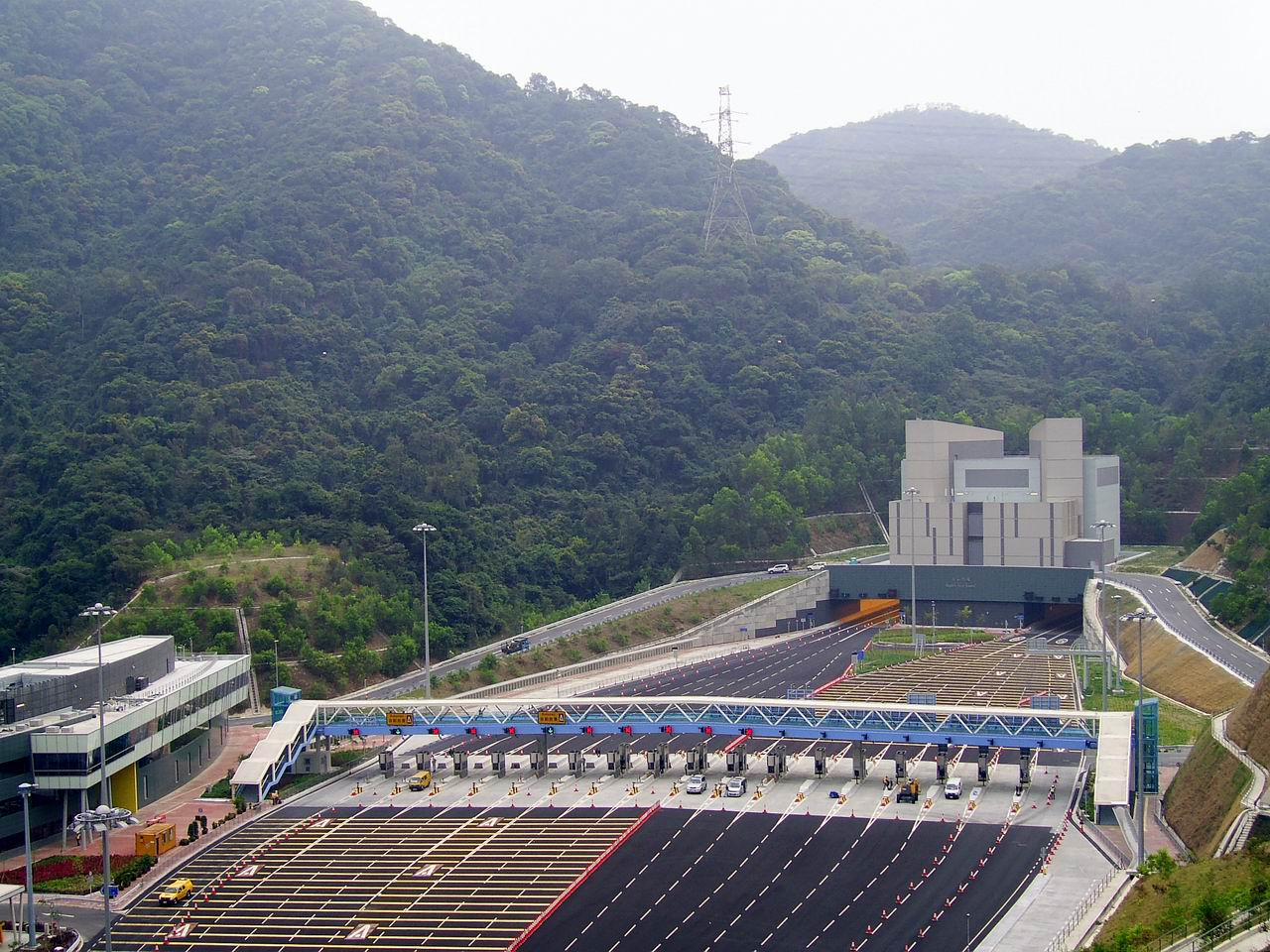
Eagle's Nest Tunnel Sha Tin Entrance

The hill is the site of Sha Tin Heights Tunnel and nearby Eagle's Nest Tunnel, a major infrastructure project in the area.

== See also ==
- List of mountains, peaks and hills in Hong Kong
