= Lai Chi Kok station =

MTR station in Kowloon, Hong Kong

Lai Chi Kok 茘枝角
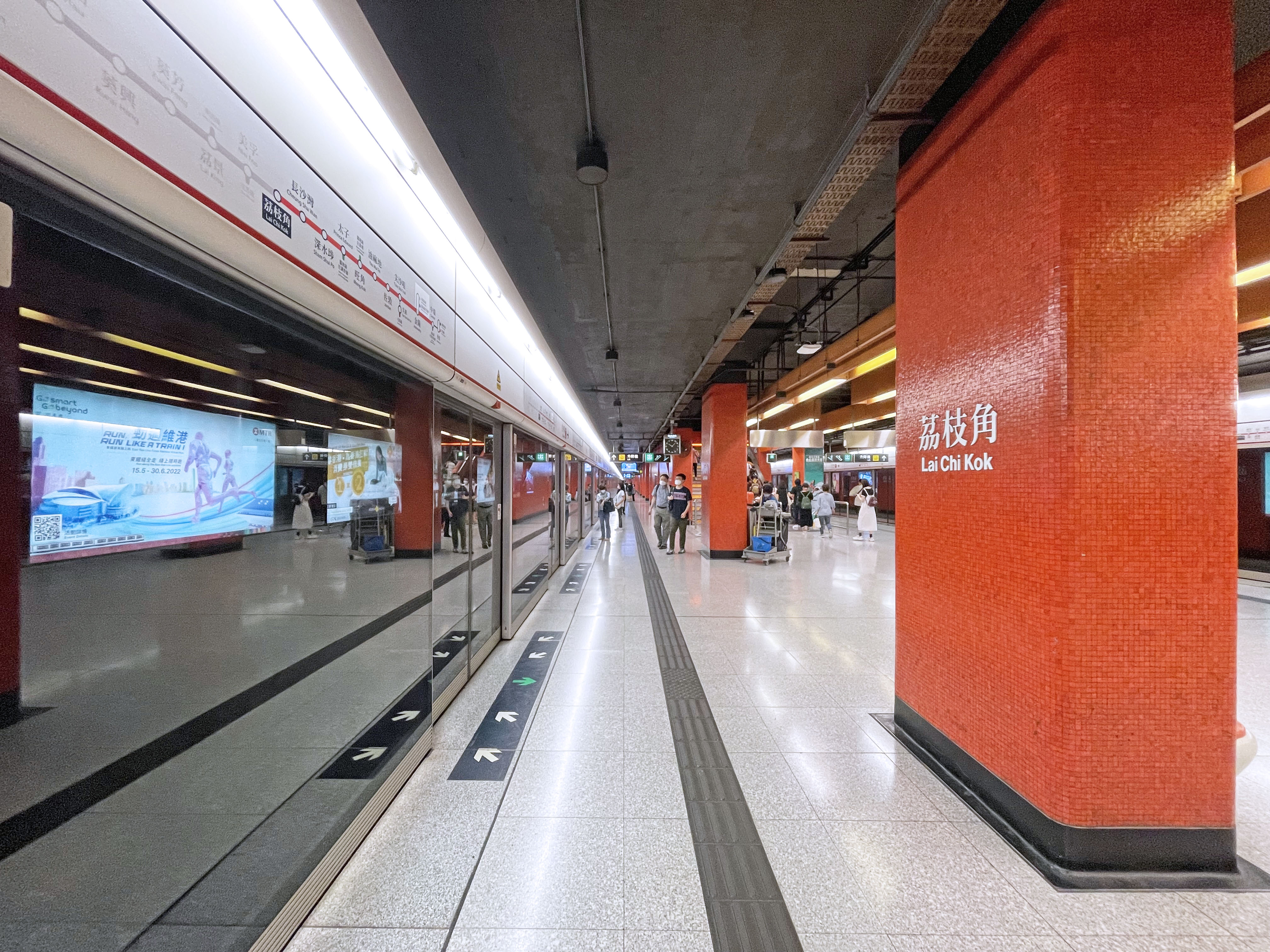
- Platform 2

Chinese name
- Chinese: 茘枝角
- Cantonese Yale: Laihjīgok
- Literal meaning: Lychee Corner
Transcriptions
Standard Mandarin
- Hanyu Pinyin: Lìzhījiǎo
Yue: Cantonese
- Yale Romanization: Laihjīgok
- Jyutping: Lai6zi1gok3

General information
- Location: Cheung Sha Wan Road near Cheung Sha Wan Plaza, Cheung Sha Wan; Sham Shui Po District; Hong Kong
- Coordinates: 22°20′14″N 114°08′54″E
- System: MTR rapid transit station
- Owner: MTR Corporation
- Operator: MTR Corporation
- Line: Tsuen Wan line
- Platforms: 2 (1 island platform)
- Tracks: 2
- Connections: Bus, minibus

Construction
- Structure type: Underground
- Platform levels: 1
- Accessible: yes

Other information
- Station code: LCK

History
- Opened: 17 May 1982; 44 years ago
- Former names: Cheung Sha Wan

Services
Preceding station	MTR	Following station
Cheung Sha Wan towards Central	Tsuen Wan line	Mei Foo towards Tsuen Wan
Track layout
Location
- Location within MTR

Lai Chi Kok (Chinese: 茘枝角) is an MTR station on the Tsuen Wan line. It is located under Cheung Sha Wan Road, in Kowloon, Hong Kong. It was opened on 17 May 1982. The station's livery is bright red.

Although the station is called Lai Chi Kok, it is located in Cheung Sha Wan. Passengers can use this station to access the western and southern parts of Cheung Sha Wan. Western Cheung Sha Wan used to be an industrial area, but in recent years, several residential developments have been built on the reclaimed land, namely Banyan Garden, Liberté, The Pacifica, Aqua Marine, and Hoi Lai Estate. There is a pedestrian subway to connect the station these estates.

Additionally, industrial buildings are being demolished and being rebuilt into brand new commercial buildings. The re-purposing of industrial units into office and retail units has led to the station having a high stream of passengers during peak hour periods.

The Chinese name of the station does not use the commonly used character 荔, but the character 茘 instead, which is the correct one according to the Kangxi dictionary. The same is true for Lai King station.

== History ==
On 10 May 1982, Tsuen Wan line opened to the public, but Lai Chi Kok station did not open until 17 May. The station was built by Kumagai Gumi.

== Station layout ==
G	Ground level	Exits, transport interchange
L1	Concourse	Customer Service centre, MTRShops (7-Eleven, Circle K, Hung Fook Tong, Maxim's Catering, Travel Expert, Pako's, I & m's, etc.)
L1	Concourse	Hang Seng Bank, vending machine, ATMs
L1	Concourse	Octopus promotion machine
L2; Platforms	Platform 2	Tsuen Wan line towards Central (Cheung Sha Wan) →
L2; Platforms	Island platform, doors will open on the right
L2; Platforms	Platform 1	← Tsuen Wan line towards Tsuen Wan (Mei Foo)

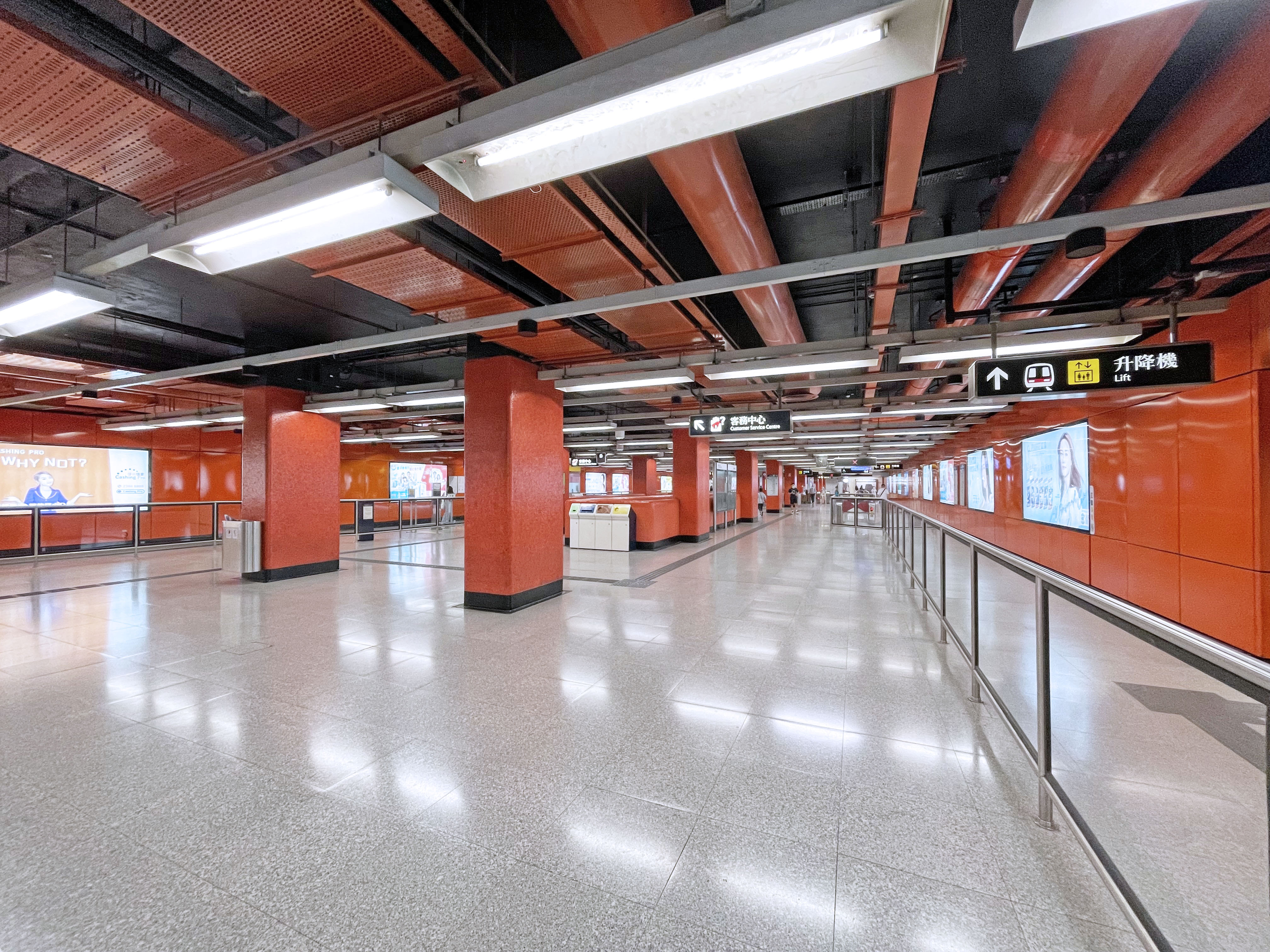
Lai Chi Kok Station Concourse

== Colour scheme ==
The station's colour scheme is orange-red because of the bright red colour of the fruit after which the district is named.

== Entrances/Exits ==
- A: Cheung Sha Wan Plaza, Sham Shui Po Sports Ground
- B1/B2: Tai Nam West Street, Cheung Sha Wan Road
- C: Tung Chau West Street
- D1/D2: D2 Place ONE and TWO, Cheung Sha Wan Police Station
- D3: Liberté
- D4: Lai Chi Kok Road, Hoi Lai Estate
