= Piper's Hill =

Peak in Hong Kong

Piper's Hill, Hong Kong
- 琵琶山
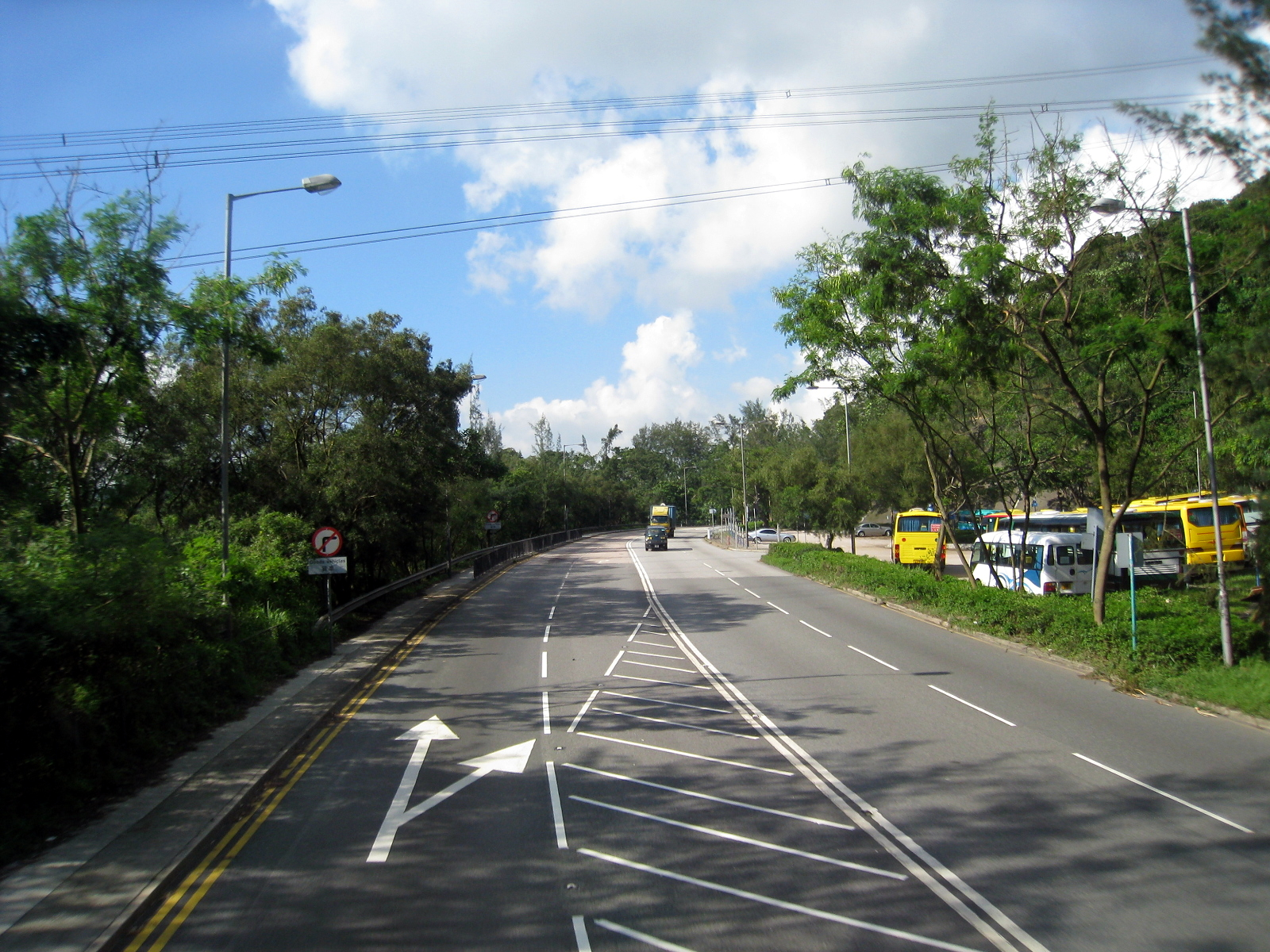
- View of Tai Po Road near Piper's Hill in June 2008

Highest point
- Elevation: 230 m (750 ft)
- Coordinates: 22.3459°N 114.1521°E

Geography
- Location within Hong Kong
- Location: Hong Kong

Piper's Hill (Chinese: 琵琶山; Jyutping: pei^{4}paa^{4}saan^{1}) is a hill north of Cheung Sha Wan in Kowloon of Hong Kong. Administratively, it is on the border between Sham Shui Po District and Sha Tin District.

== Geography ==
The hill is to the east of Butterfly Valley and to the west of Eagle's Nest. Tai Po Road goes through Lai Chi Kok Pass in over hill. With a height of 230 metres, the hill has a helipad at its peak, accessible via Piper's Hill Road.

== See also ==
- Geography of Hong Kong
- List of mountains, peaks and hills in Hong Kong
- Lion Rock
