= Cheung Sha Wan =

Area of Hong Kong

- Traditional Chinese: 長沙灣
- Simplified Chinese: 长沙湾
Transcriptions
Standard Mandarin
- Hanyu Pinyin: Chángshāwān
Yue: Cantonese
- Yale Romanization: Chèuhngsāwàahn
- Jyutping: Coeng^{4}saa^{1}waan^{4}

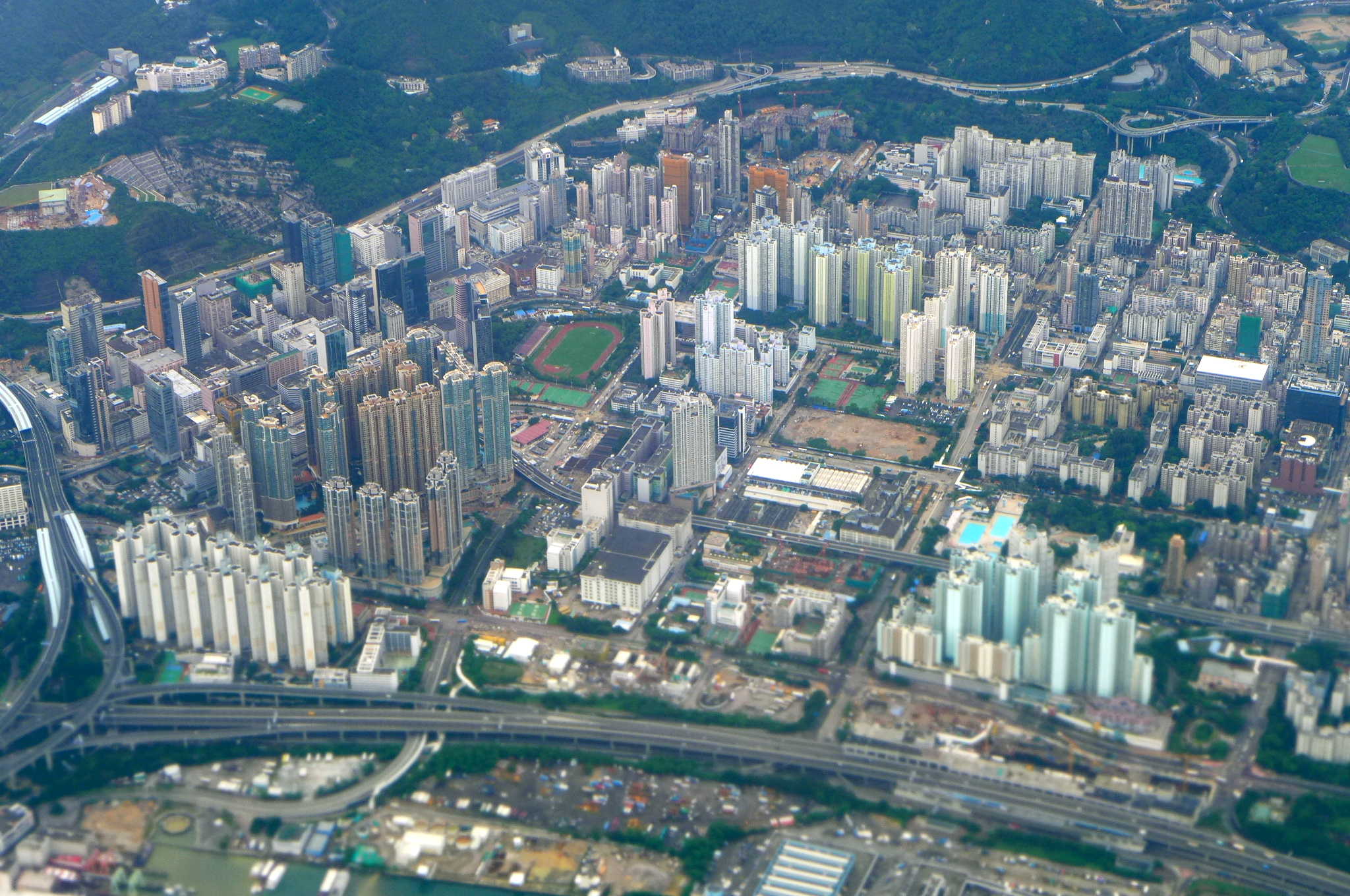
Aerial view of Cheung Sha Wan

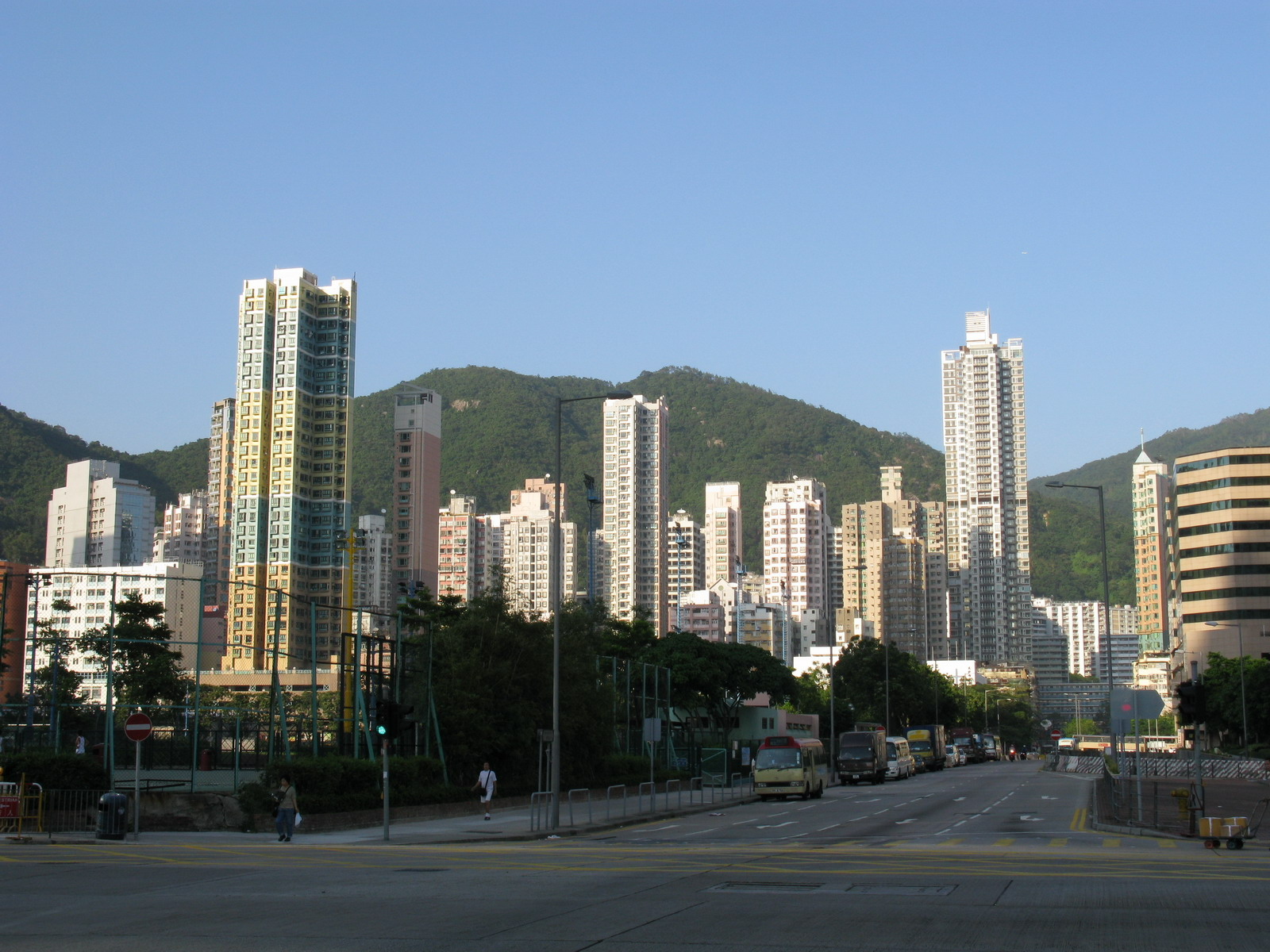
A junction near Fortune Estate in east Cheung Sha Wan.

Cheung Sha Wan (長沙灣; Chèuhngsāwàahn; 'Long Sandy Bay') is an area between Lai Chi Kok and Sham Shui Po in New Kowloon, Hong Kong. It is mainly residential to the north and south, with an industrial area in between. Administratively it is part of Sham Shui Po District, which also includes Lai Chi Kok.

== Name ==
The 灣 in its Cantonese name would normally be pronounced as wāan with a first, high-flat tone; however, in this particular case, the tone shifts to a fourth, low-falling tone, making it wàahn instead. The same tone shift happens in the Cantonese names of To Kwa Wan (土瓜灣; Tóugwāwàahn) and Causeway Bay (銅鑼灣; Tùhnglòhwàahn), though Tùhnglòhwāan with a first tone is also common.

== History ==
As its Cantonese name suggests, it was formerly a bay with a long sandy beach. It spans roughly from today's Butterfly Valley Road at the west to Yen Chow Street at the east. The beach was a gathering place for many Tanka fishermen before its development. The original shoreline approximates the present Castle Peak Road and Un Chau Street. Inland, villages of Om Yam, Ma Lung Hang, Pak Shu Lung, So Uk, Li Uk, Wong Uk and others sparsely occupied the whole bay of Cheung Sha Wan. Rivers from Beacon Hill, Crow's Nest and Piper's Hill formed a long plain behind the beach. Farmlands filled between villages. A larger river ran in Butterfly Valley separating Cheung Sha Wan and Lai Chi Kok. A sandbar was found at the mouth of its estuary.

The Lei Cheng Uk Han Tomb is located in Cheung Sha Wan, and dates from AD 25 - 220. It is the oldest known constructed structure in Hong Kong, and demonstrates that early Chinese civilisation had spread to Hong Kong by 2,000 years ago.

At the time of the 1911 census, the population of Cheung Sha Wan was 653. The number of males was 496.

Before World War I, two ends, Lai Chi Kok and Sham Shui Po, of Cheung Sha Wan had been reclaimed. The former was for military use and the later emerged as a new town north of Tai Kok Tsui.

In April 2006, a total of 580 unused shells from the Japanese occupation of Hong Kong were found buried at Tonkin Street in Cheung Sha Wan. The residents were temporarily evacuated and the shells were detonated safely.

The bay of Cheung Sha Wan was reclaimed in several phases in the twentieth century. The last reclamation in 1990s extended the area close to Stonecutters Island. The shipbuilding and repair industries on the old shore were moved to near the island and the sites were replaced by some private housing estates constructed in the early 2000s.

== Economy ==
Cheung Sha Wan was a manufacturing centre after the war, with a number of light industries, especially textile and clothing. After the China implemented the reform and opening up in the 1980s, many factories relocated to the mainland, vacating the area's industrial buildings (some of which have since been converted into offices and warehouses). There are several wholesale markets in Cheung Sha Wan. They include Cheung San Wan Temporary Wholesale Poultry Market, Cheung Sha Wan Vegetable Wholesale Market and many wholesale clothes markets. The Vegetable Marketing Organisation's Premium Vegetable Packaging Centre also locates in central Cheung Sha Wan.

The head office of Giordano is in the Tin On Industrial Building, Cheung Sha Wan.

The area is also home to several former Hong Kong Housing Authority factory estates, including Wang Cheong Factory Estate.

== Housing ==
=== Private housing estates ===
Several of the private housing estates were built on a former site of a shipyard which was relocated owing to the commencement of the West Kowloon Reclamation, or reclaimed land adjacent to it.

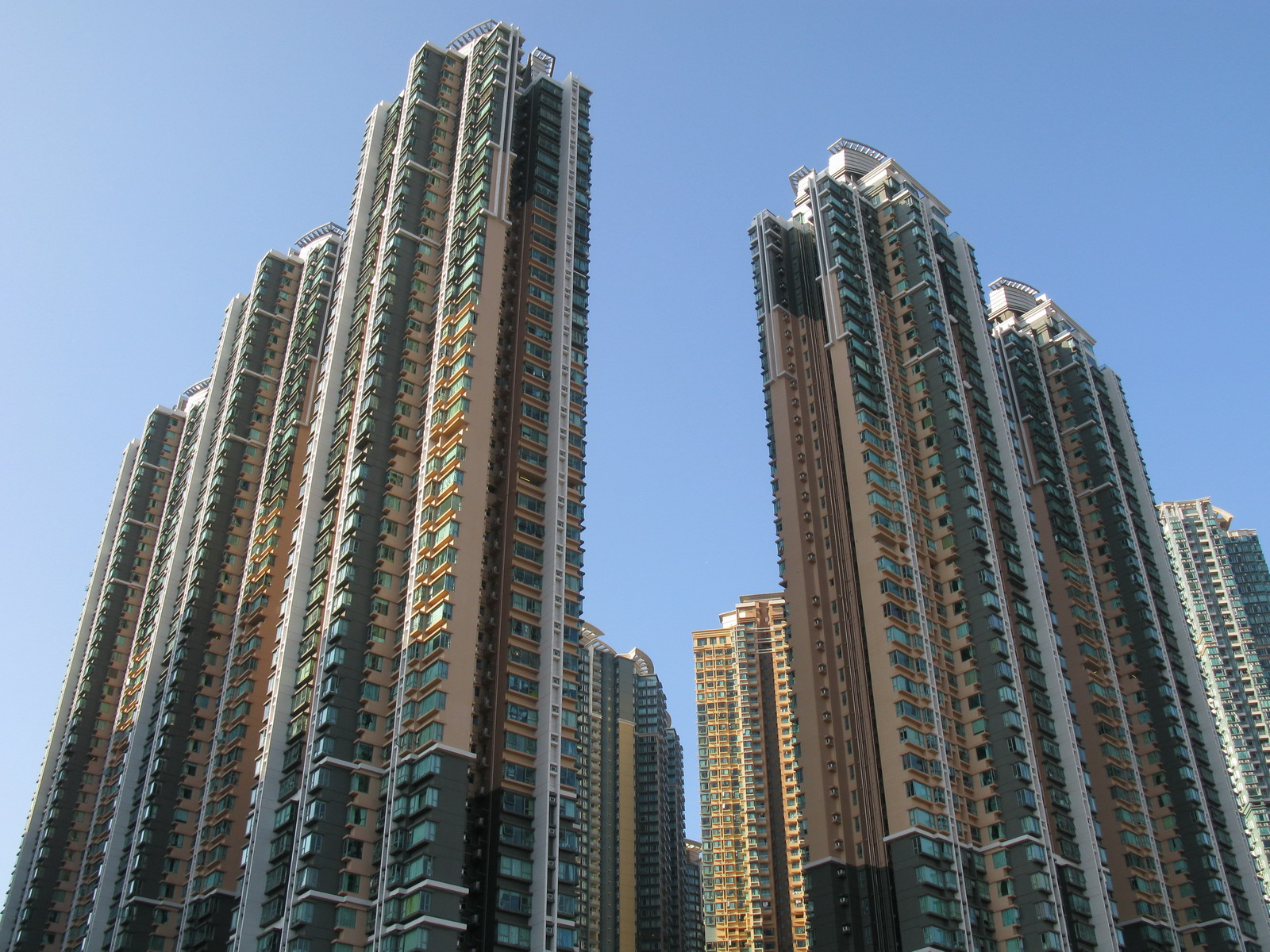
Aqua Marine

Four private housing estates are collectively known as the "Four Little Dragons of West Kowloon" (Chinese: 西九四小龍) because each of them are similar in scale and they are located next to each other.

- Aqua Marine (碧海藍天; Bīkhói Làahmtīn; 'Jade Sea and a Blue Sky') is a private housing estate developed on the reclaimed land by Hang Lung Properties and Korean-based Hyundai Engineering and Construction. It comprises 5 residential towers and retail podium completed in 2003.
- Banyan Garden (泓景臺; Wàhnggíngtòih) consists of seven towers. Each of the tallest towers (tower 2, 6 and 7) has 57 floors and the roof height is 191 m (627 ft). They are among the tallest buildings in Hong Kong and the 100 tallest residential buildings in the world since the complex was completed in 2003.
- Liberté (昇悅居; Sīng'yuhtgēui) consists of seven residential towers, five of which rank among the 100 tallest buildings in the territory. Towers 1, 2 and 3 each rise 181 m (594 ft), towers 5 and 6 rise 180 m (591 ft) The complex was completed in late 2003.
- The Pacifica (宇晴軒; Yúhchìhnghīn) complex consists of approximately 2,000 condominiums in six residential towers, each of which rank among the 70 tallest buildings in the city. The towers, numbered 1, 2, 3, 5, 6 and 7, each rise 197 m (646 ft) and 50-66 floors, Construction began in 2002 and the complex was completed in 2006.

=== Public housing estates ===
A new public housing estate named Hoi Lai Estate (formerly named Hoi Lai Court before the government turned it into a public housing estate) is located in the area and had the most expensive rental fees within the Sham Shui Po District.

== Education ==
Cheung Sha Wan is in Primary One Admission (POA) School Net 40. Within the school net are multiple aided schools (operated independently but funded with government money) and two government schools: Fuk Wing Street Government Primary School and Li Cheng Uk Government Primary School.

== Transport ==
=== MTR stations ===
The area is served by two stations on MTR Tsuen Wan line:

- Cheung Sha Wan station in the east and,
- Lai Chi Kok station in the west.

Lai Chi Kok station is actually located not in Lai Chi Kok, but in Cheung Sha Wan. The fact that references to Cheung Sha Wan can be found on many buildings and amenities near Lai Chi Kok station continues to be a source of confusion for many.

=== Bus routes ===
These bus routes terminate in Cheung Sha Wan, but on Cheung Sha Wan Road, Lai Chi Kok Road and Castle Peak Road there are many more routes that are available.
