= Un Chau & So Uk (constituency) =

- Former Elected constituency for the Sham Shui Po District Council
- District: Sham Shui Po
- Legislative Council constituency: Kowloon West
- Population: 18,626 (2015)
- Electorate: 10,274 (2015)

Former constituency
- Created: 2011
- Abolished: 2019
- Number of members: One
- Member: Chan Wai-ming (DAB) (last)
- Created from: Un Chau; So Uk
- Replaced by: Un Chau; So Uk

Un Chau & So Uk (Chinese: 元州及蘇屋) was one of the constituencies in the Sham Shui Po District of Hong Kong which was created in 2011 and abolished in 2019.

The constituency was created in 2011 from the two constituencies of Un Chau and So Uk due to the decrease in population of So Uk Estate as it underwent a period of redevelopment. It loosely covers the two public housing estates, Un Chau Estate and So Uk Estate with an estimated population of 18,626.

== Councillors represented ==
Election	Member	Party
2011	Chan Wai-ming	DAB
2019	Constituency abolished	

== Election results ==
=== 2010s ===
Sham Shui Po District Council Election, 2015: Un Chau & So Uk
Party	Candidate	Votes	%	±%
DAB	Samuel Chan Wai-ming	3,491	75.06	+16.82
Civic Passion	Fong Chi-lung	1,160	24.94	
Majority		2,331	50.12	
Turnout		4,651	45.27	
DAB hold		Swing		

Sham Shui Po District Council Election, 2011: Un Chau & So Uk
Party	Candidate	Votes	%	±%
DAB	Samuel Chan Wai-ming	3,403	58.24	
ADPL	Sze Tak-loy	1,947	33.32	
LSD (Socialist Action)	Sally Tang Mei-ching	493	8.44	
Majority		1,456	24.92	
Turnout		5,843	47.52	
DAB win (new seat)				
