= So Uk (constituency) =

- 蘇屋
- Elected constituency for the Sham Shui Po District Council
- Boundary of So Uk in Sham Shui Po District
- District: Sham Shui Po
- Legislative Council constituency: Kowloon West
- Population: 18,751 (2019)
- Electorate: 7,028 (2019)

Current constituency
- Created: 1994 (first time); 2019 (second time)
- Number of members: One
- Member: Ho Kwan-chau (DAB)
- Created from: Un Chau & So Uk
- Replaced by: Un Chau & So Uk (2011)

So Uk (Chinese: 蘇屋) is one of the 25 constituencies in the Sham Shui Po District.

First created in 1994 District Board election and was abolished in 2011 due to the redevelopment of So Uk Estate and resettlement of the population. It was re-created from Un Chau & So Uk for the 2019 District Council elections, the constituency returns one district councillor to the Sham Shui Po District Council, with an election every four years.

So Uk loosely covers the public housing estate So Uk Estate in Cheung Sha Wan. It has projected population of 18,751.

== Councillors represented ==
Election	Member	Party
1994	Chan Chi-shing	SSPRA
1999	Samuel Chan Wai-ming	DAB
2011	Constituency abolished	
2019	Leo Ho Kwan-chau	DAB

== Election results ==
=== 2010s ===
Sham Shui Po District Council Election, 2019: So Uk
Party	Candidate	Votes	%	±%
DAB	Leo Ho Kwan-chau	2,650	50.74	
ADPL	Chan Ming-kei	2,522	48.29	
Independent	Lam Pui-man	51	0.98	
Majority		128	2.45	
Turnout		5,237	74.57	
DAB win (new seat)				

=== 2000s ===
Sham Shui Po District Council Election, 2007: So Uk
Party	Candidate	Votes	%	±%
DAB	Samuel Chan Wai-ming	3,074	71.17	+8.99
ADPL	Lau Wai-tak	1,245	28.83	+11.61
Majority		1,829	42.34	
DAB hold		Swing		

Sham Shui Po District Council Election, 2003: So Uk
Party	Candidate	Votes	%	±%
DAB	Samuel Chan Wai-ming	2,524	62.18	+15.52
Democratic	Ma Kee	836	20.60	+0.67
ADPL	Lau Wai-tak	699	17.22	−14.75
Majority		1,688	41.58	
DAB hold		Swing		

=== 1990s ===
Sham Shui Po District Council Election, 1999: So Uk
Party	Candidate	Votes	%	±%
DAB	Samuel Chan Wai-ming	1,595	47.70	
ADPL	Edwin Chan Yue-wing	1,069	31.97	
Democratic	David Yam Siu-wai	680	20.33	
Majority		526	5.73	
DAB gain from [[SSPRA|Sham Shui Po Residents Association]]		Swing		

Sham Shui Po District Board Election, 1994: So Uk
Party	Candidate	Votes	%	±%
SSPRA	Chan Chi-shing	Uncontested		
[[SSPRA|Sham Shui Po Residents Association]] win (new seat)				
