= So Uk =

Coordinates: 22.3411°N 114.1548°E

So Uk (Chinese: 蘇屋; Cantonese Yale: Sōuūk) is an area in New Kowloon of Hong Kong, located to the north of Cheung Sha Wan. It was originally a village founded and resided by a clan bearing the surname So. The area now includes the area surrounding So Uk Estate, and a major hospital, Caritas Medical Centre, is also located within the area.

== History ==
When the first ancestor of the So Clan of So Uk arrived in 1739, he called his new home Mau Tin Tsuen (lit. "Village of the Rough Grass Fields"); and his descendants long used this name before So Uk came into common usage.

In the 1950s, the original So Uk Village, occupied largely by squatter huts, was demolished to make way for a public housing estate, later known as "So Uk Estate".
