= Un Chau (constituency) =

- 元州
- Elected constituency for the Sham Shui Po District Council
- Boundary of Un Chau in Sham Shui Po District
- District: Sham Shui Po
- Legislative Council constituency: Kowloon West
- Population: 18,422 (2019)
- Electorate: 10,707 (2019)

Current constituency
- Created: 1994 (first time); 2019 (second time)
- Number of members: One
- Member: Vacant
- Created from: Un Chau & So Uk

Un Chau (Chinese: 元州) is one of the 25 constituencies in the Sham Shui Po District of Hong Kong.

It was first created for the 1994 District Board election and was abolished in 2011 due to the redevelopment of Un Chau Estate and the resettlement of the population. It was re-created from Un Chau & So Uk for the 2019 District Council elections. The constituency returns one district councillor to the Sham Shui Po District Council, with an election every four years.

Un Chau loosely covers part of the public housing estate Un Chau Estate in Cheung Sha Wan. It has projected population of 18,422.

== Councillors represented ==
Election	Member	Party
1994	Luk Ka-ming	ADPL
1997	Luk Ka-ming	Democratic
2003	Chum Tak-shing	ADPL
2011	Constituency abolished	
2019	Lee Hon-ting→Vacant	ADPL

== Election results ==
=== 2010s ===
Sham Shui Po District Council Election, 2019: Un Chau
Party	Candidate	Votes	%	±%
ADPL	Howard Lee Hon-ting	3,960	53.61	
DAB	Samuel Chan Wai-ming	3,427	46.39	
Majority		533	7.22	
Turnout		7,432	69.48	
ADPL win (new seat)				

=== 2000s ===
Sham Shui Po District Council Election, 2007: So Uk
Party	Candidate	Votes	%	±%
ADPL	Chum Tak-shing	2,420	58.23	+1.19
DAB	Tam Chiu-yee	1,736	41.77	+26.75
Majority		684	16.46	
ADPL hold		Swing		

Sham Shui Po District Council Election, 2003: So Uk
Party	Candidate	Votes	%	±%
ADPL	Chum Tak-shing	2,677	57.04	+16.91
Democratic	Luk Ka-ming	1,311	27.94	−14.77
DAB	Tam Chiu-yee	705	15.02	−2.13
Majority		1,366	22.10	
ADPL gain from Democratic		Swing	+15.84	

=== 1990s ===
Sham Shui Po District Council Election, 1999: So Uk
Party	Candidate	Votes	%	±%
Democratic	Luk Ka-ming	1,285	42.71	
ADPL	Chum Tak-shing	1,208	40.15	−19.25
DAB	Ngai Ho-yin	516	17.15	
Majority		77	2.56	
Democratic hold		Swing		

Sham Shui Po District Board Election, 1994: So Uk
Party	Candidate	Votes	%	±%
ADPL	Luk Ka-ming	1,285	59.40	
Independent	Lo Shuk-wai	1,067	40.60	
Majority		494	18.80	
ADPL win (new seat)				
