= So Uk Estate =

Public housing estate in Hong Kong

Coordinates: 22°20′32″N 114°09′25″E

- Chinese: 蘇屋邨
- Cantonese Yale: sōu ūk chyūn
Transcriptions
Yue: Cantonese
- Yale Romanization: sōu ūk chyūn
- Jyutping: sou1 nguk1 cyun1
- IPA: [sɔw˥.ŋʊk̚˥.tsʰyn˥]

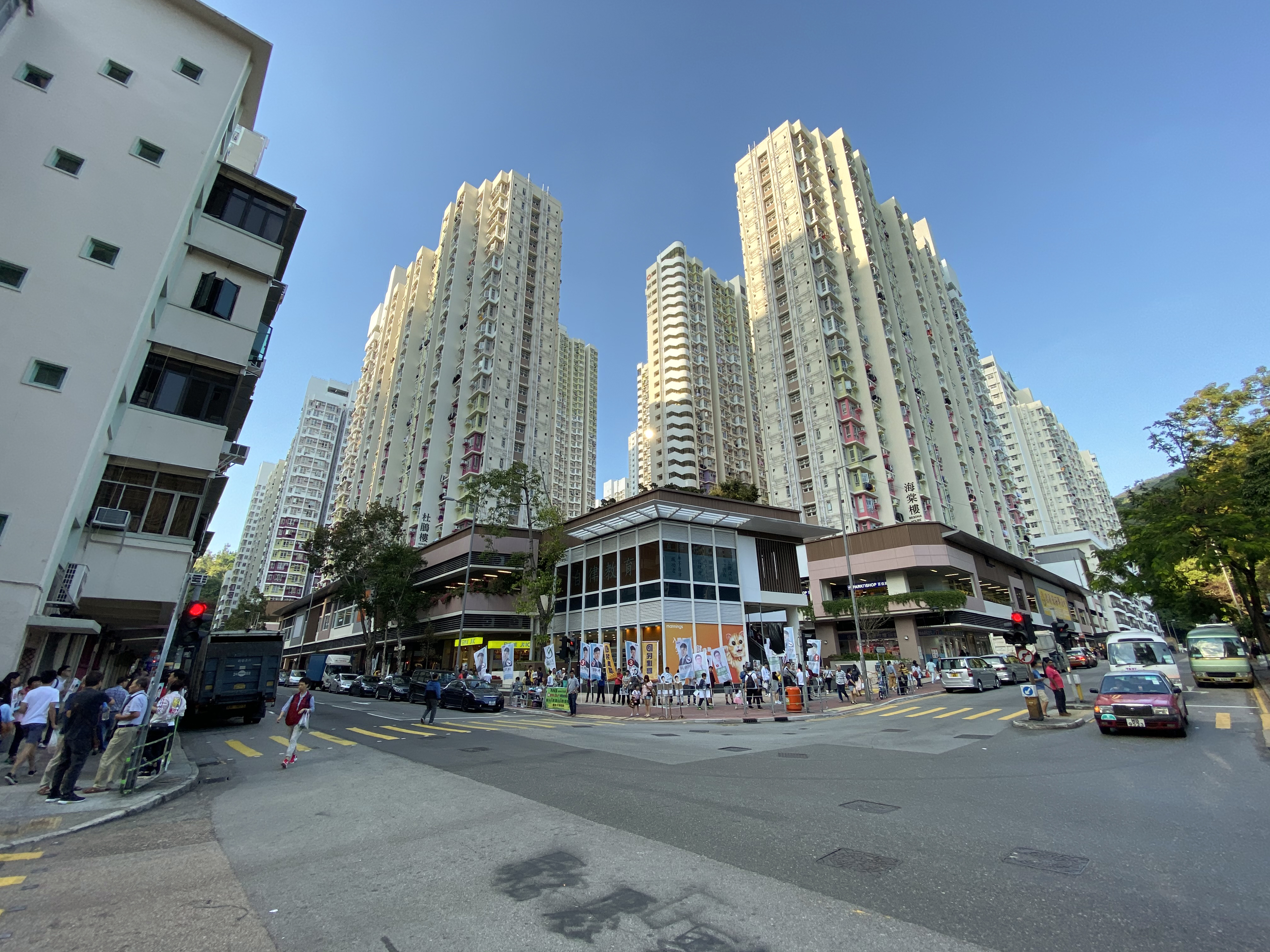
West of So Uk Estate

So Uk Estate (Chinese: 蘇屋邨; Cantonese Yale: Sōuūk Chyūn) is one of Hong Kong's earliest public housing estate in So Uk, a hillside area of Cheung Sha Wan, Kowloon. Originally built between 1960 and 1963 following the 1953 Shek Kip Mei fire, the estate was demolished and rebuilt in two phases. The redeveloped estate has 14 residential blocks with about 6,985 flats and is expected to house around 19,500 residents.

It is the third such project of Hong Kong Housing Authority, only after North Point Estate and Cadogan Street Estate (now Sai Wan Estate).

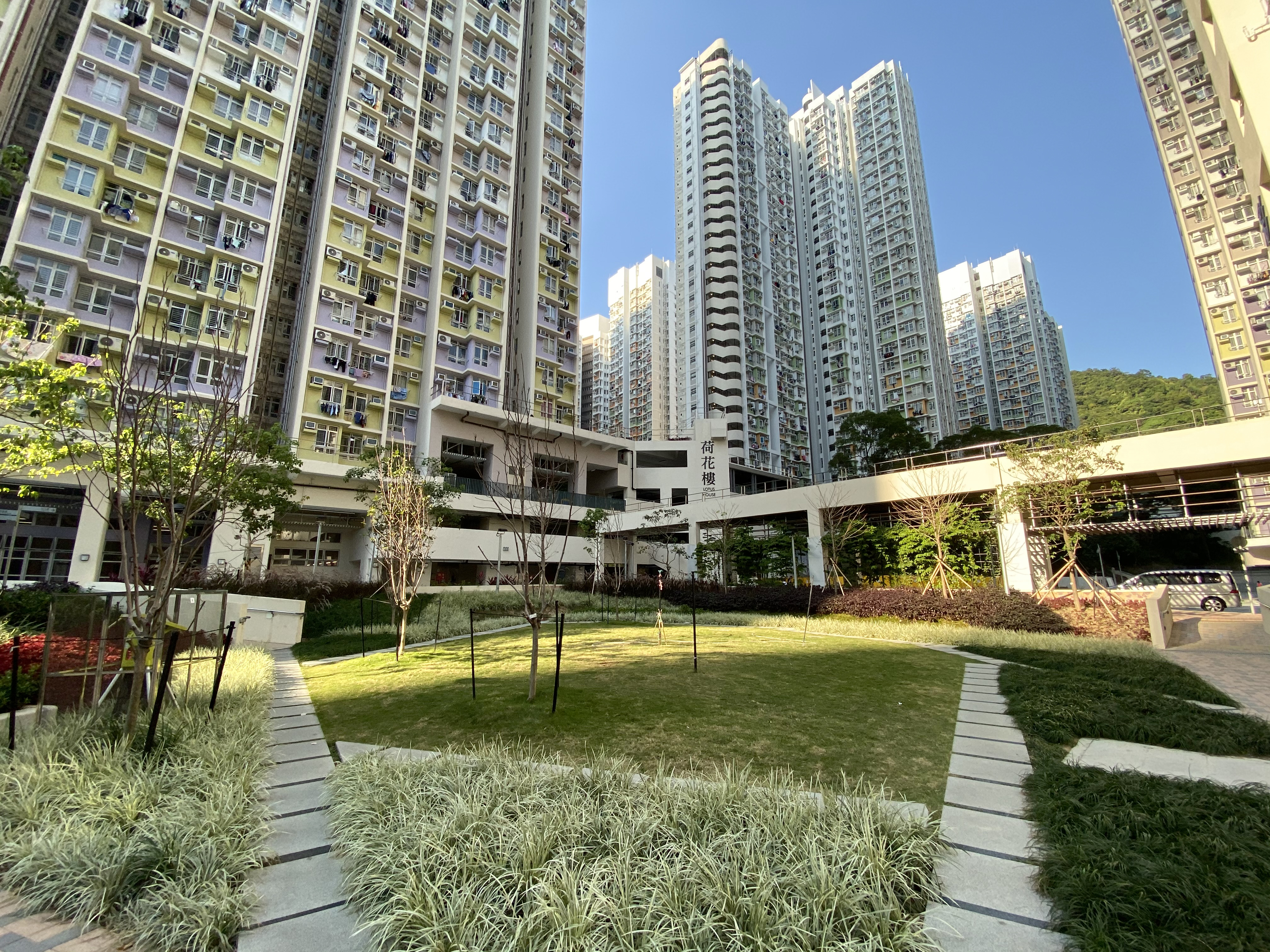
The lawn in the courtyard of So Uk Estate

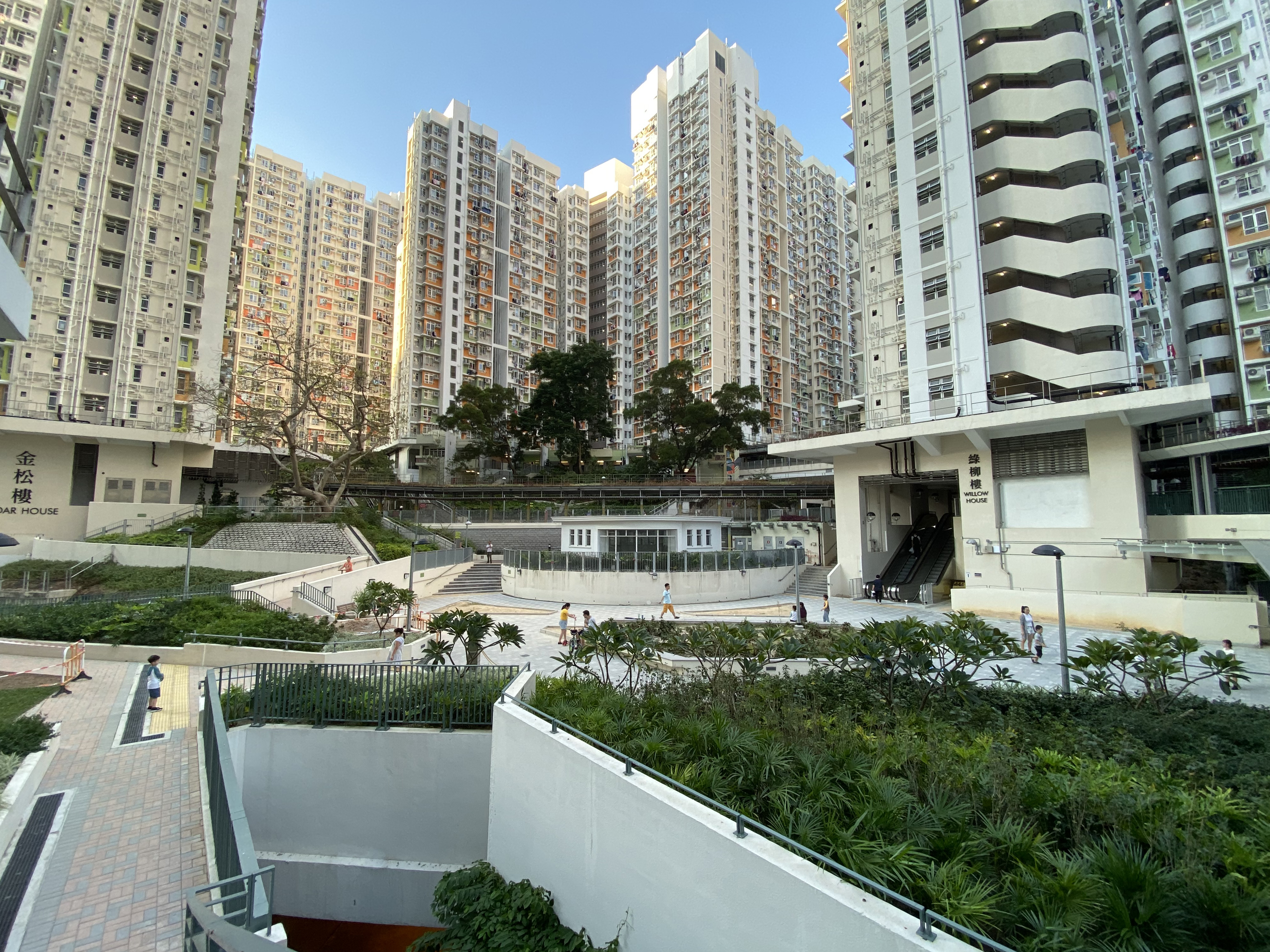
The square outside the small white house

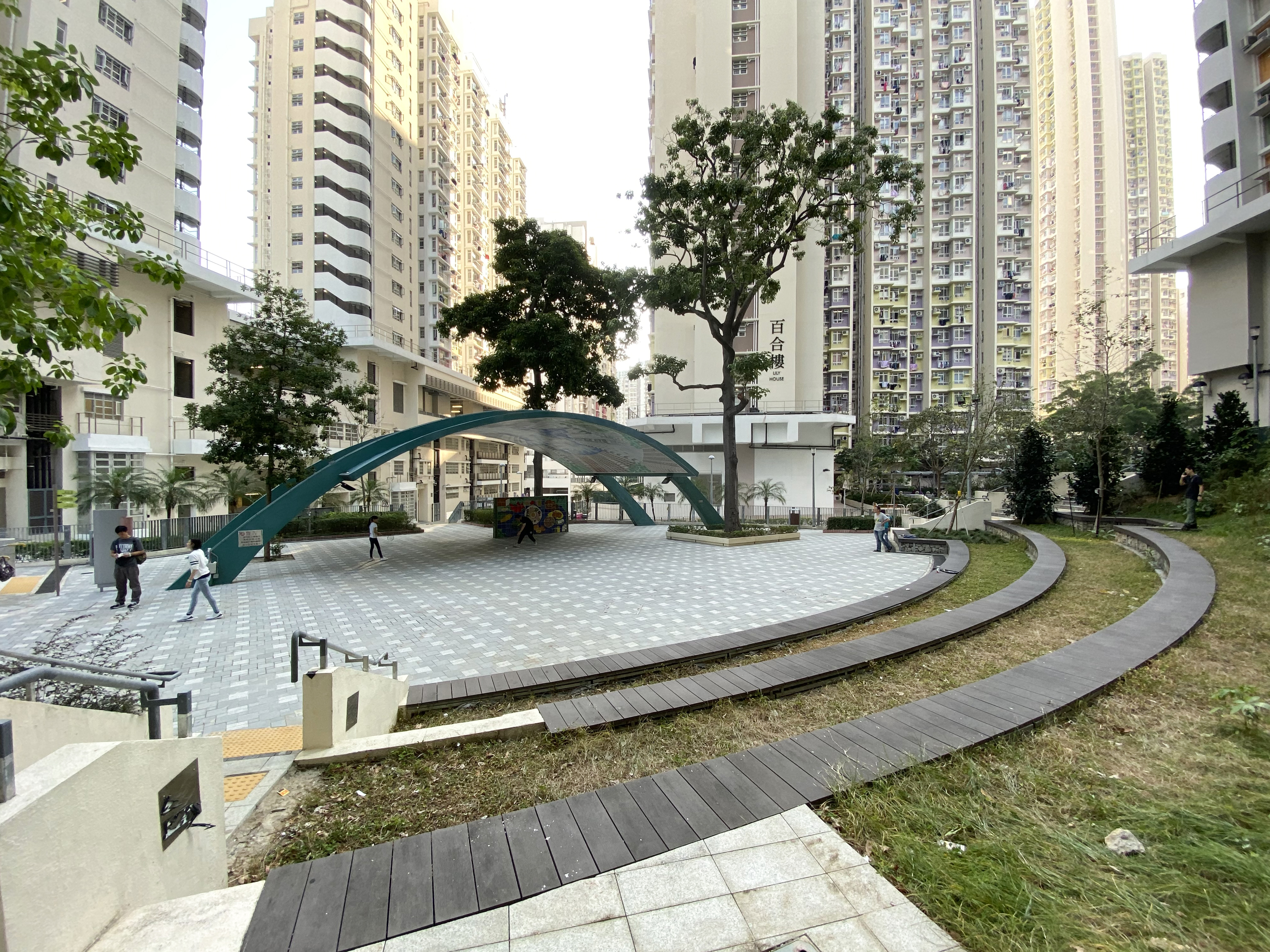
Yanziting Square

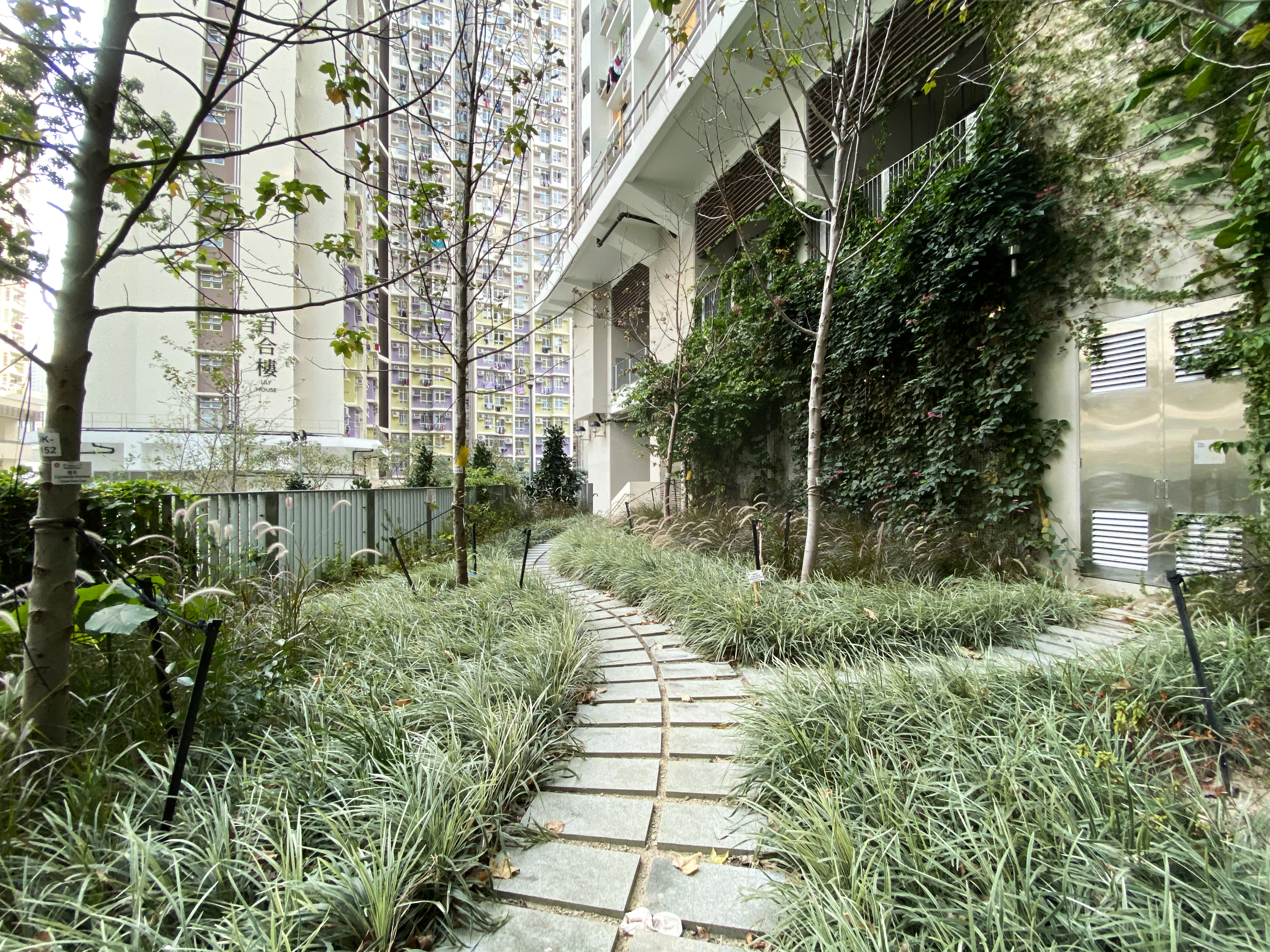
Cherry House garden area is full of various plants

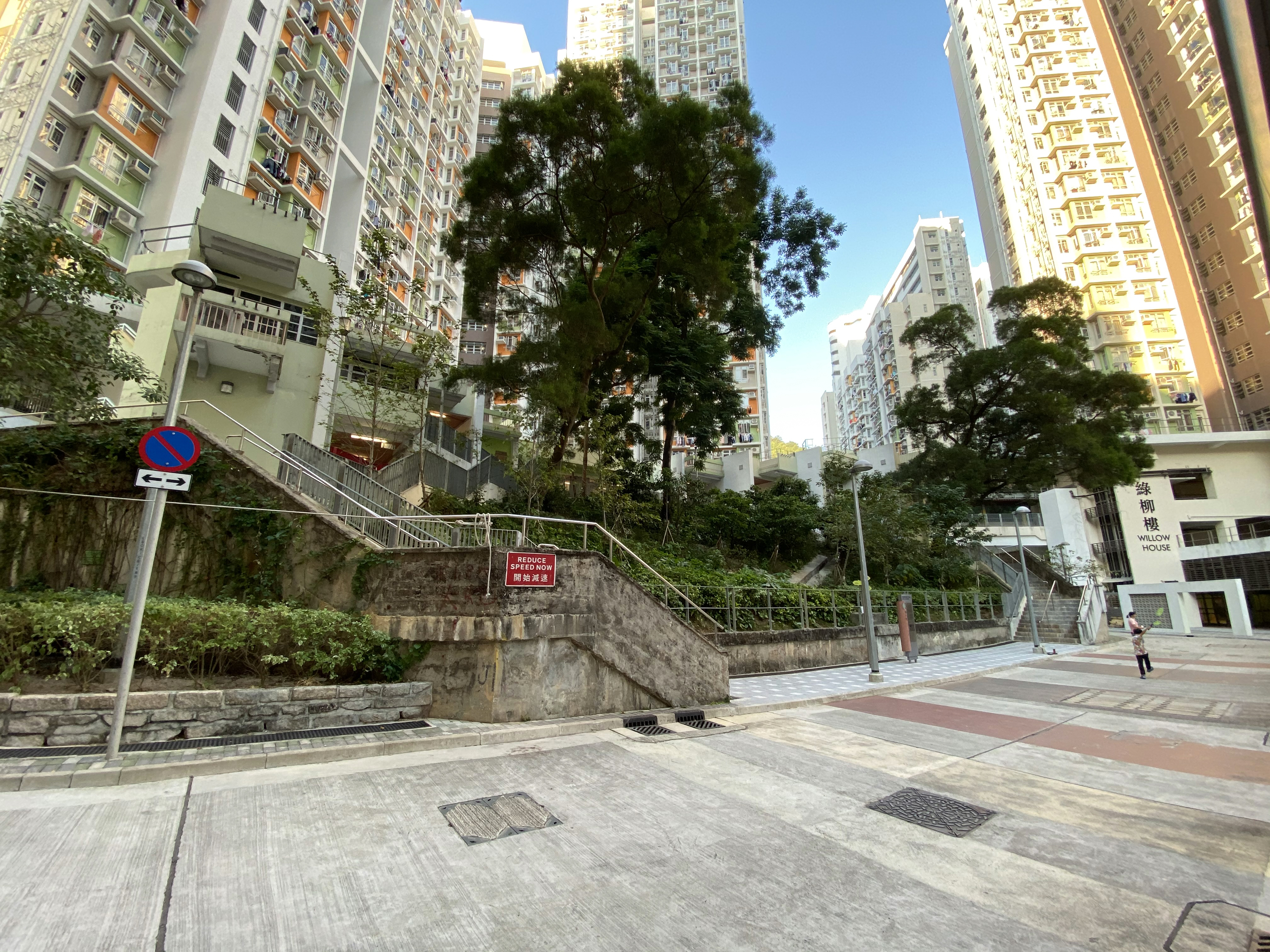
The HD preserves and restores the ground floor of the Maple Building during the reconstruction for conservation purposes

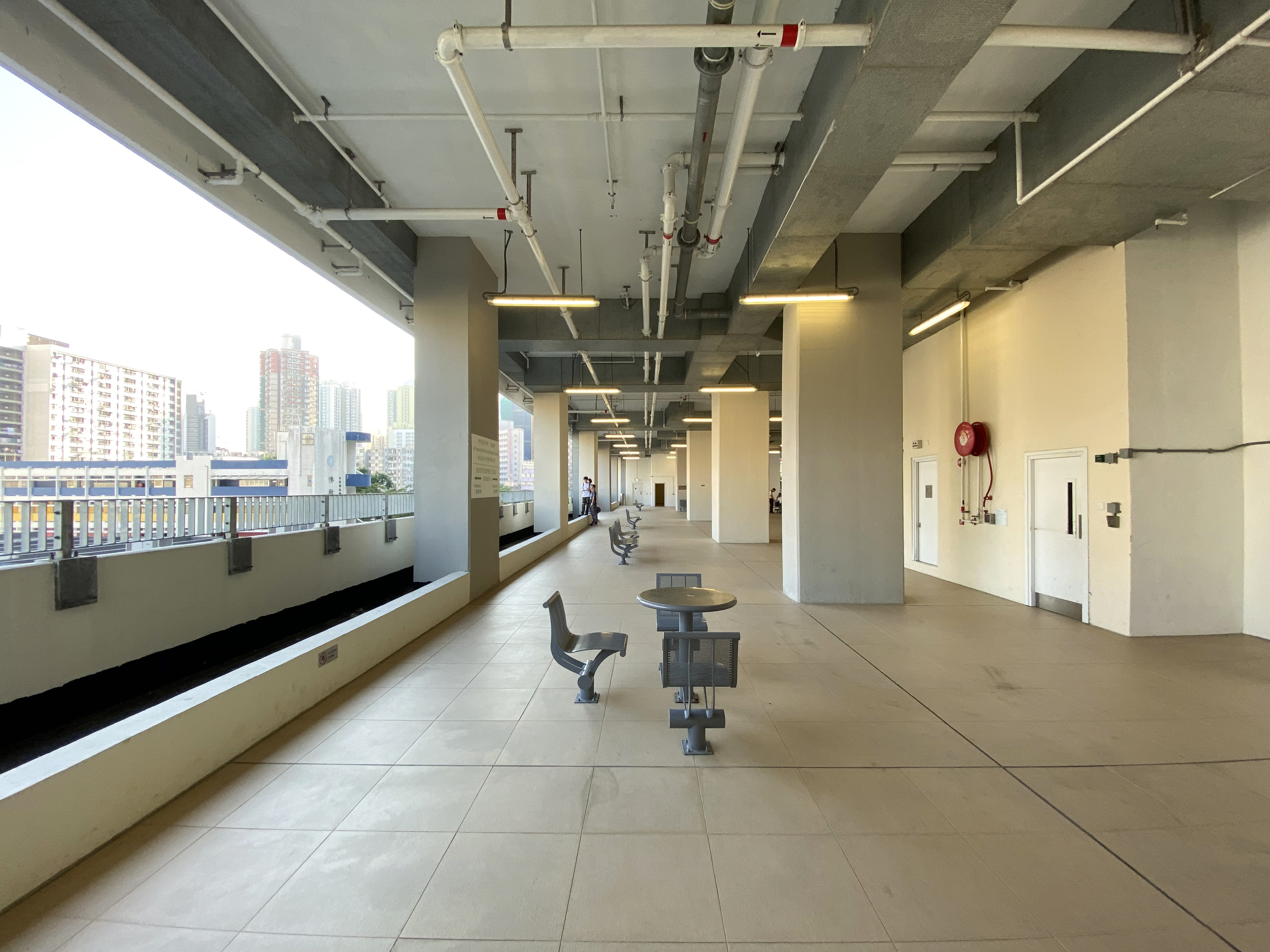
Seating area of Camellia House fire shelter

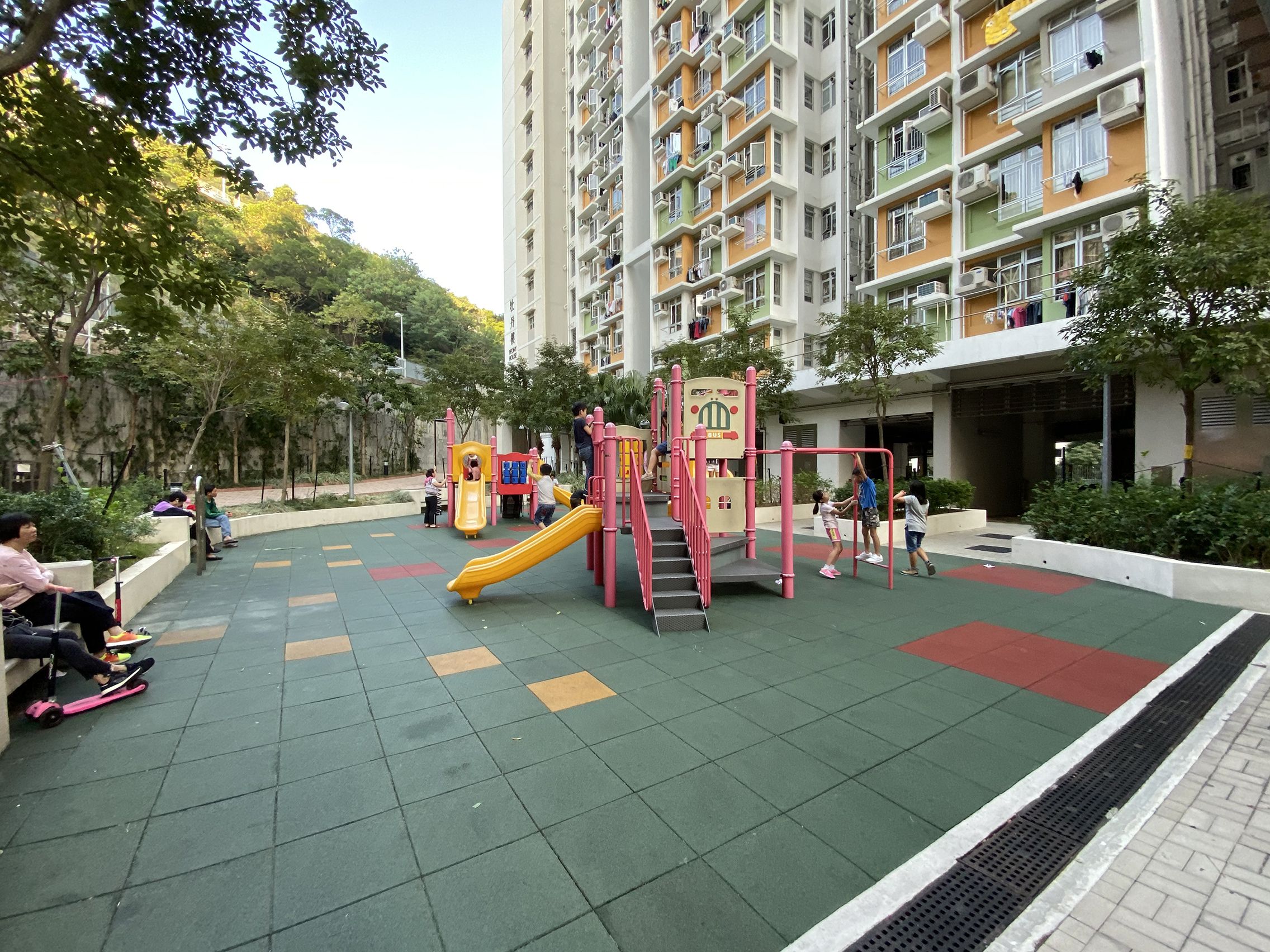
Community Playground No.5

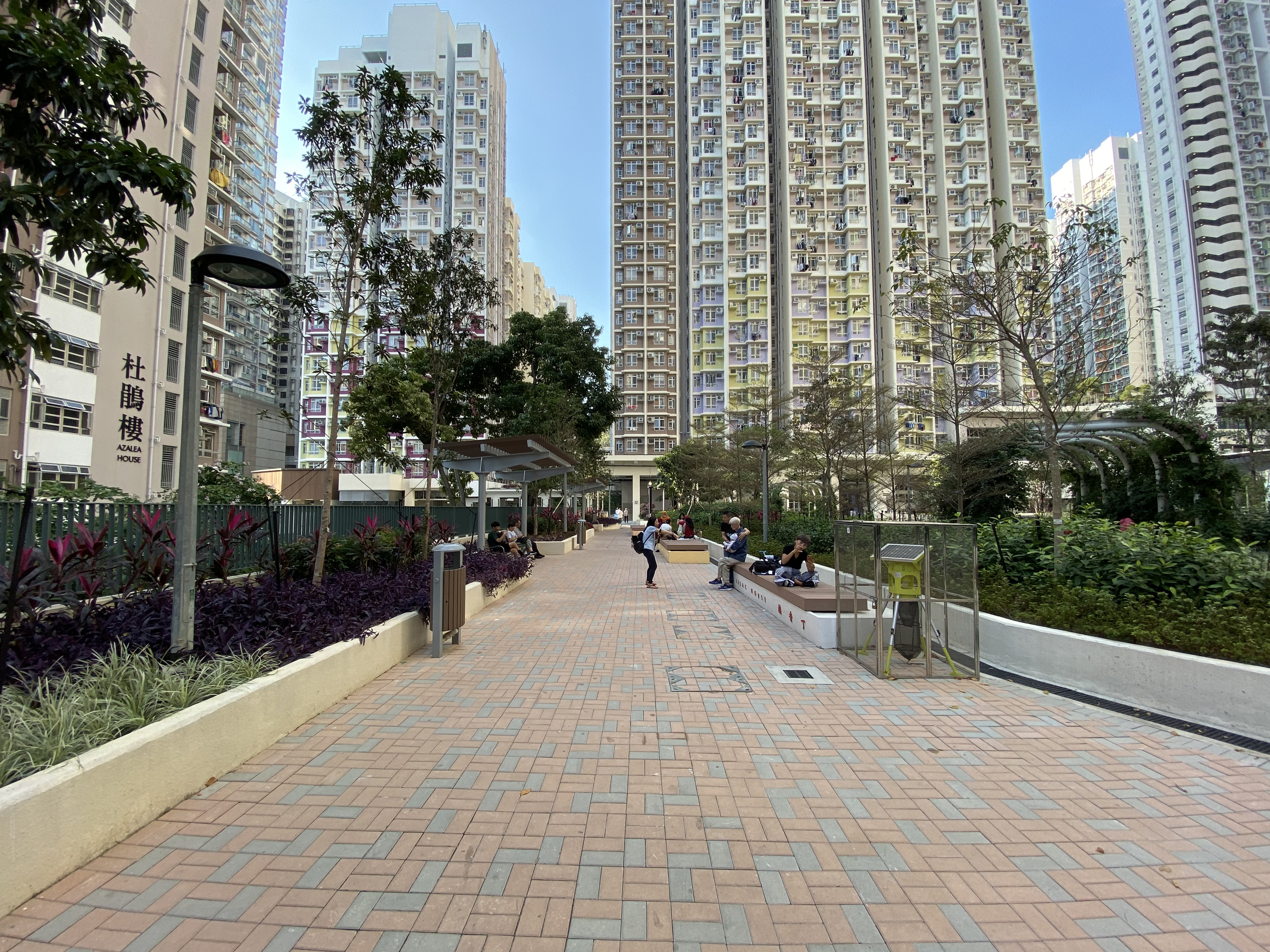
So Uk Estate Phase II Platform Garden

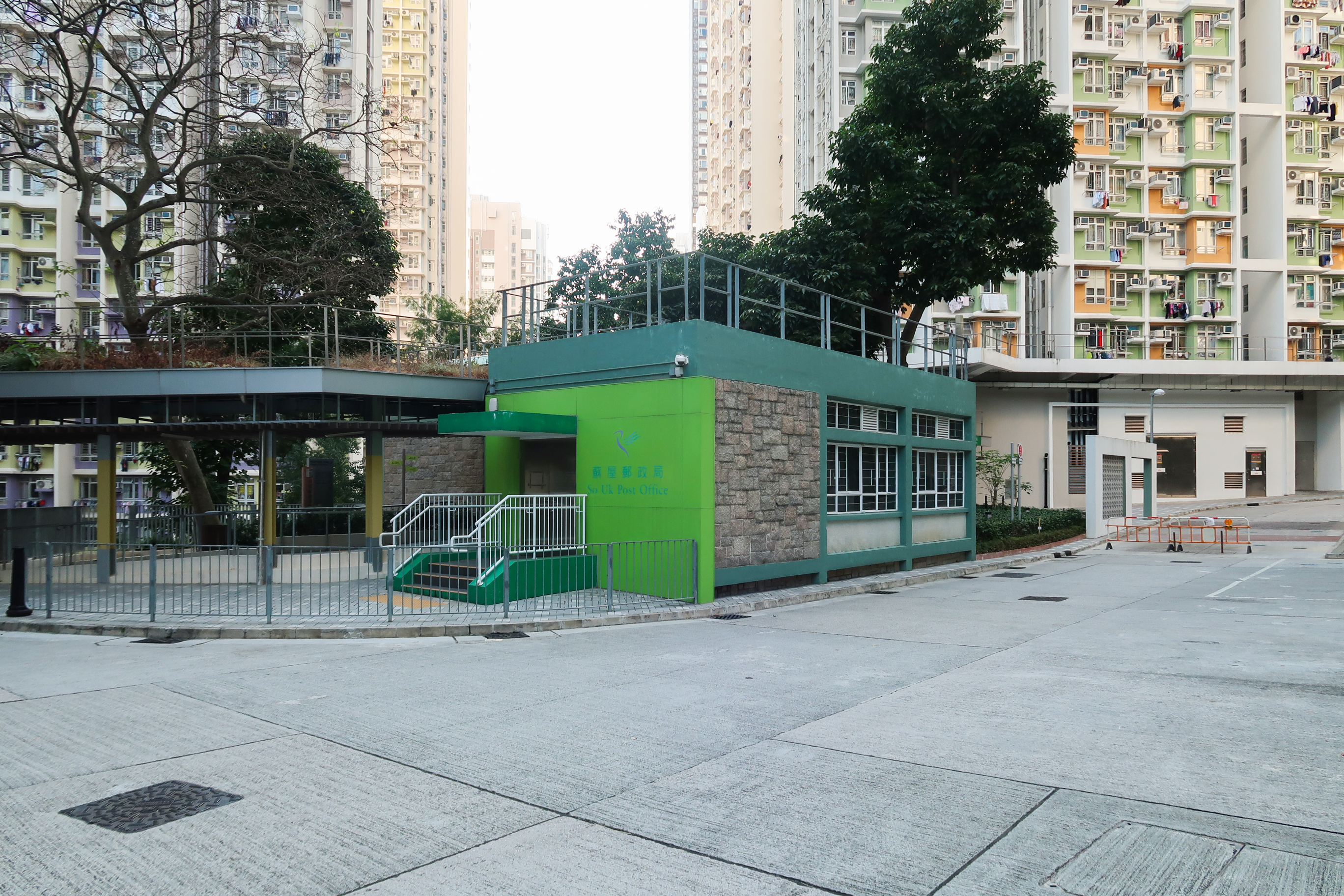
So Uk Post Office, formerly the former So Uk Post Office, located beside the Green Willow Building

== History ==
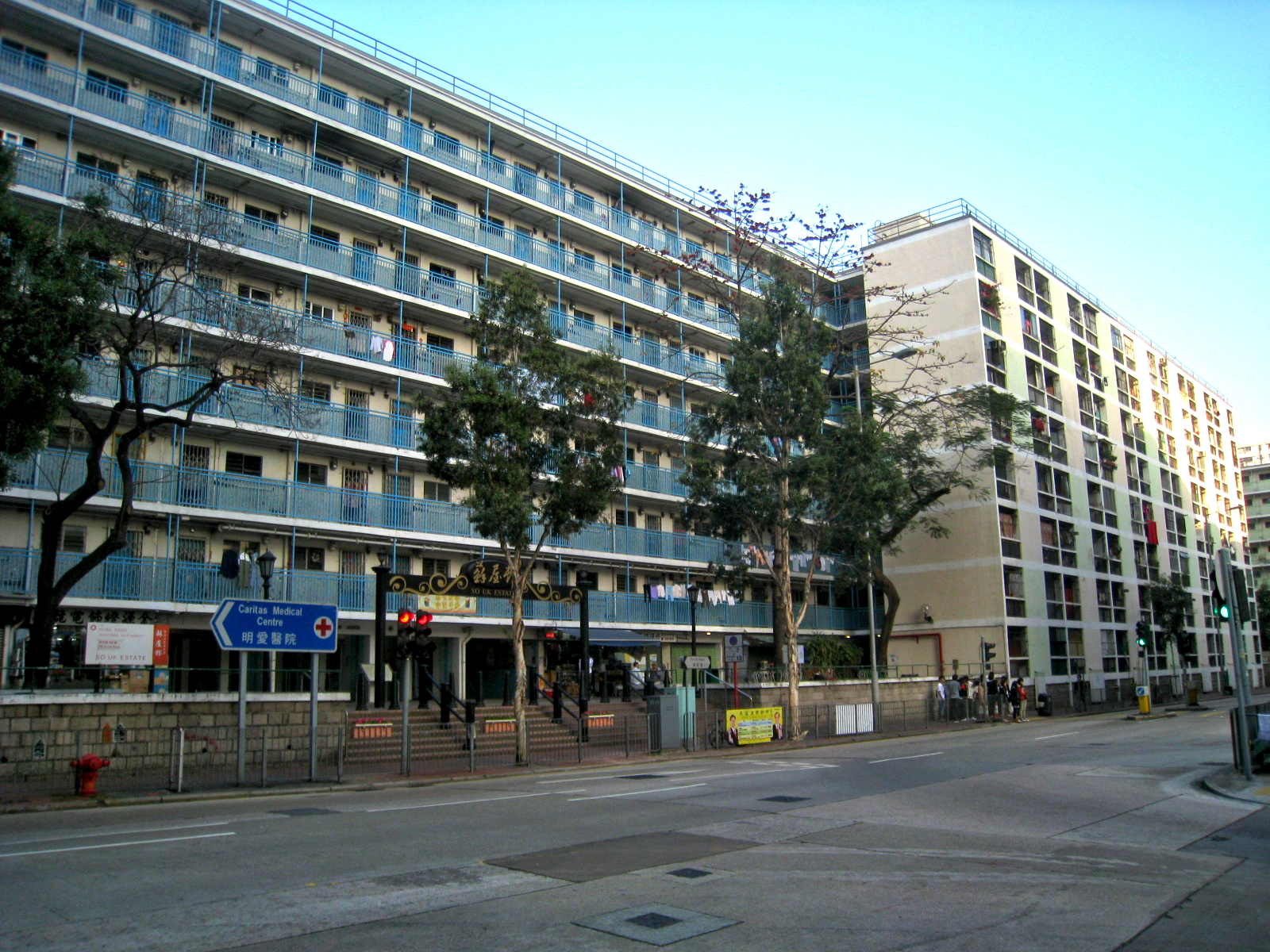
So Uk Estate

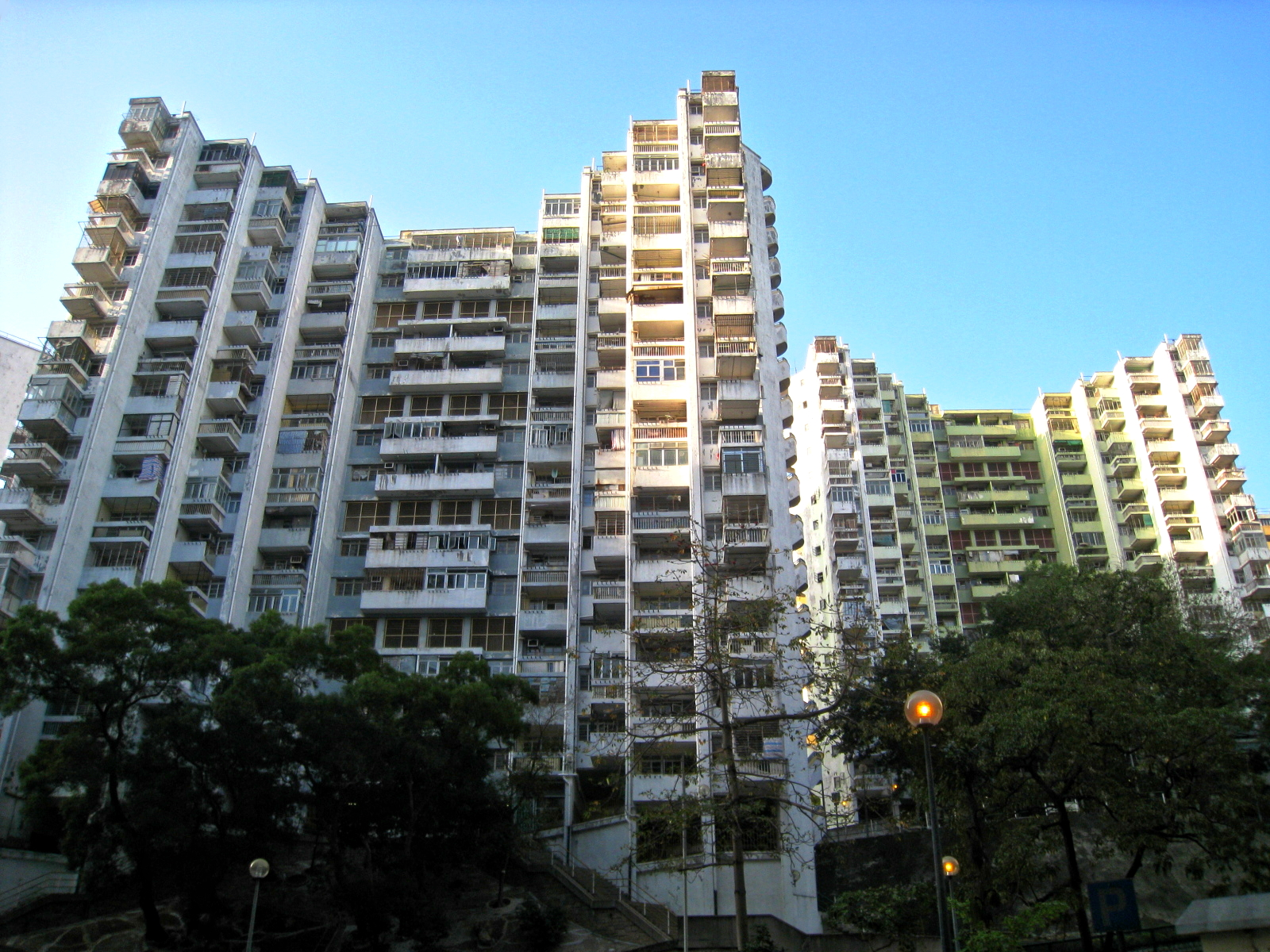
So Uk Estate Cedar House & Maple House

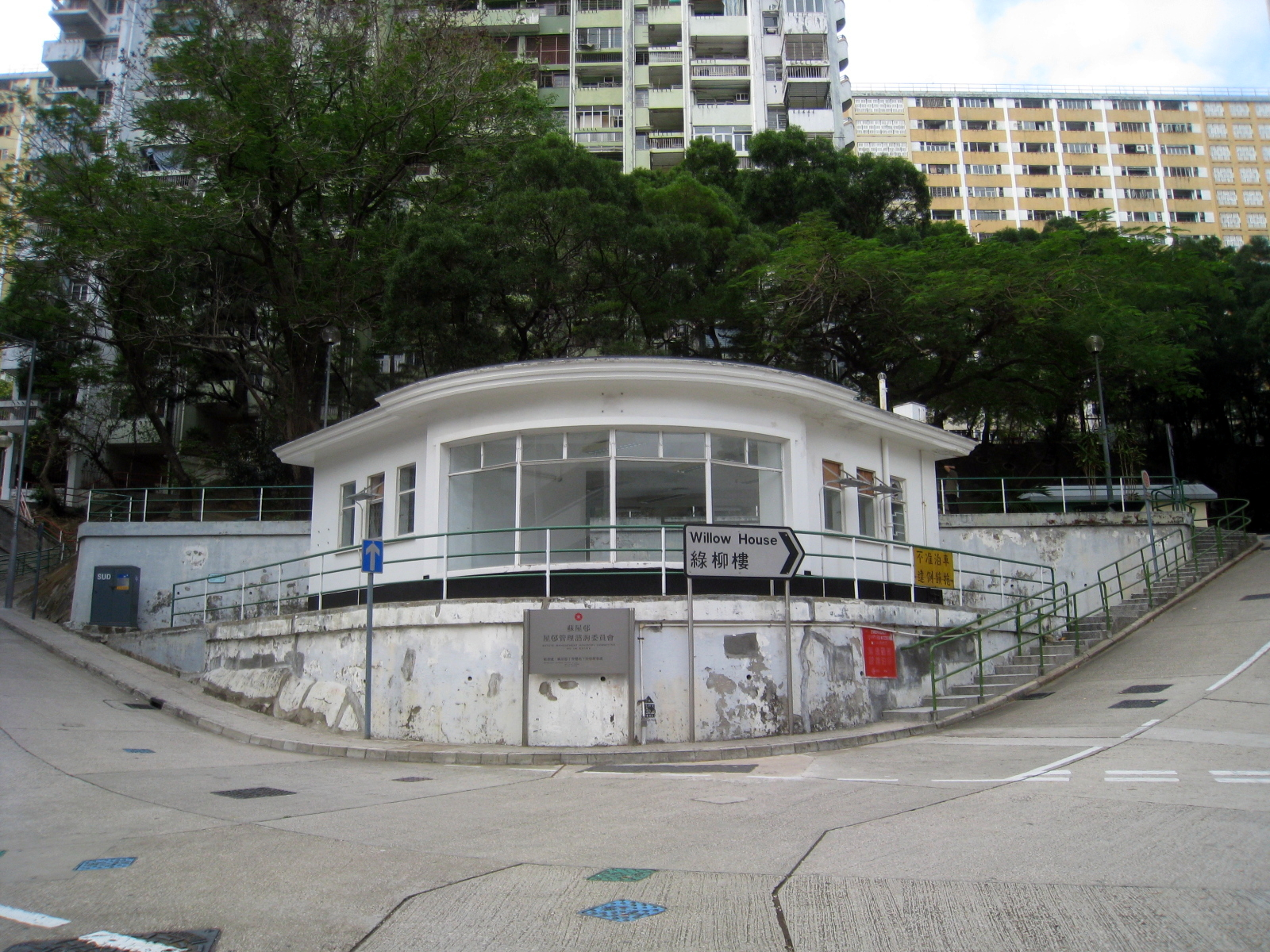
So Uk Estate abandoned Gas Station

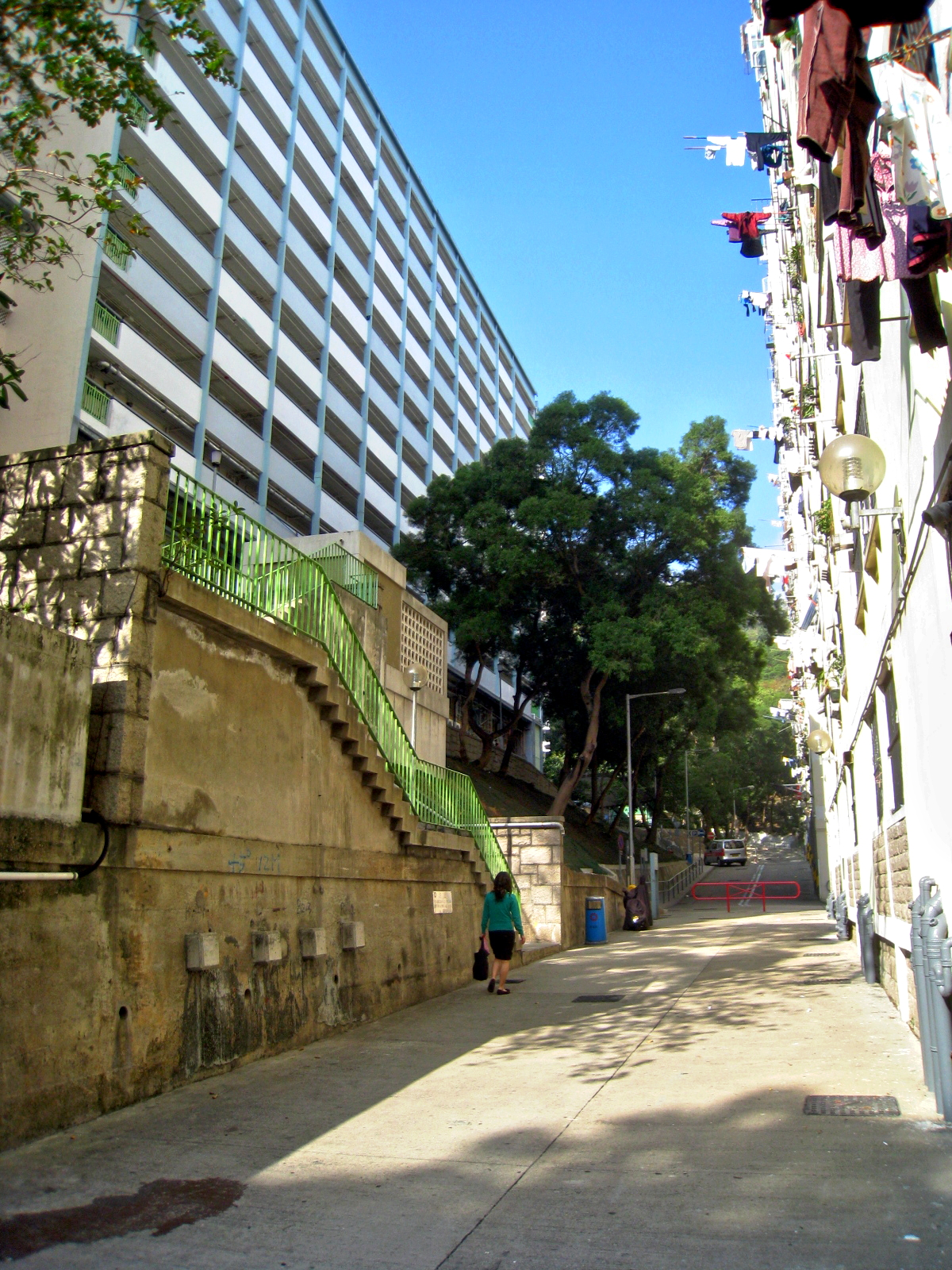
So Uk Estate Access

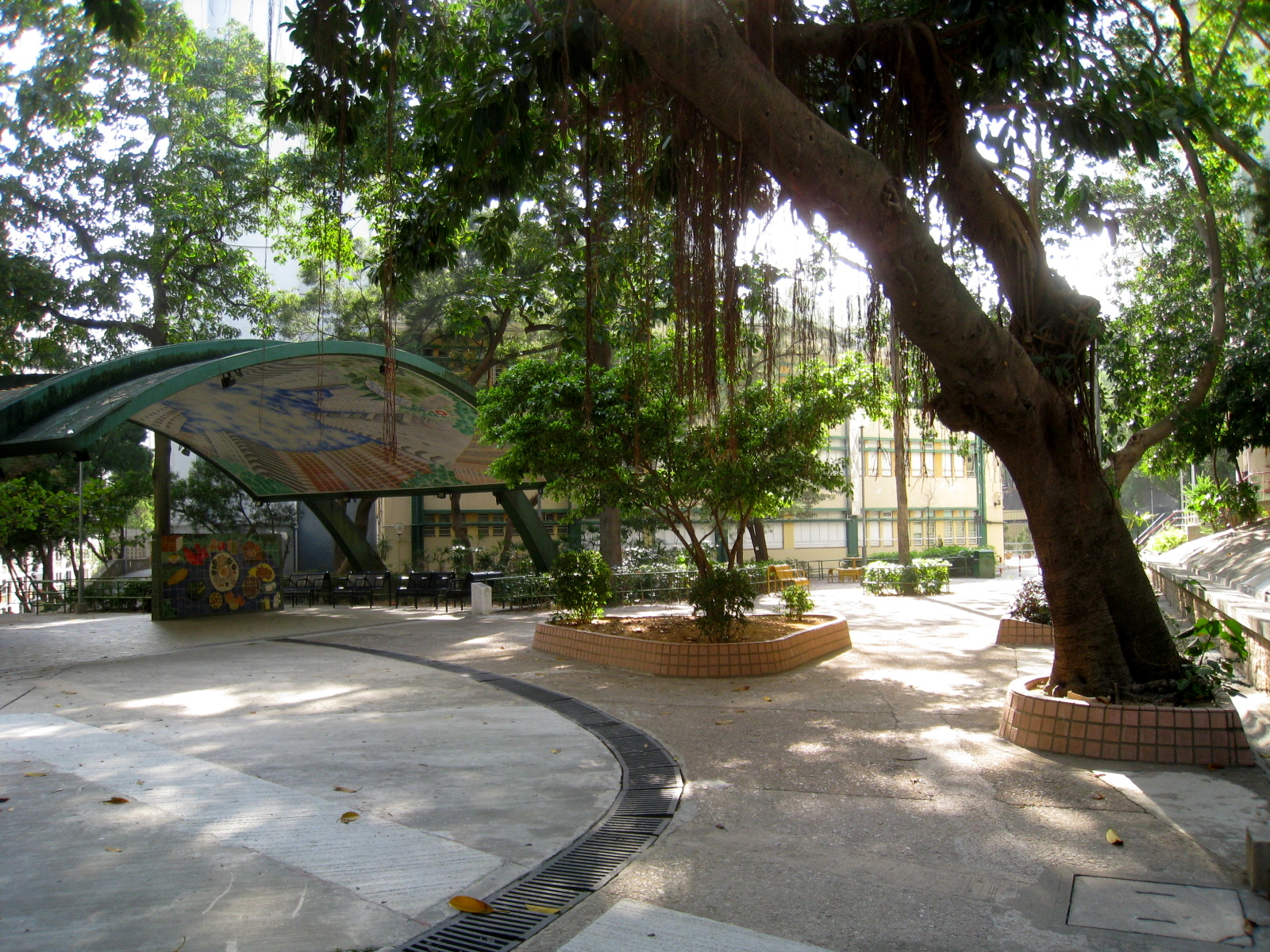
So Uk Estate Open Space

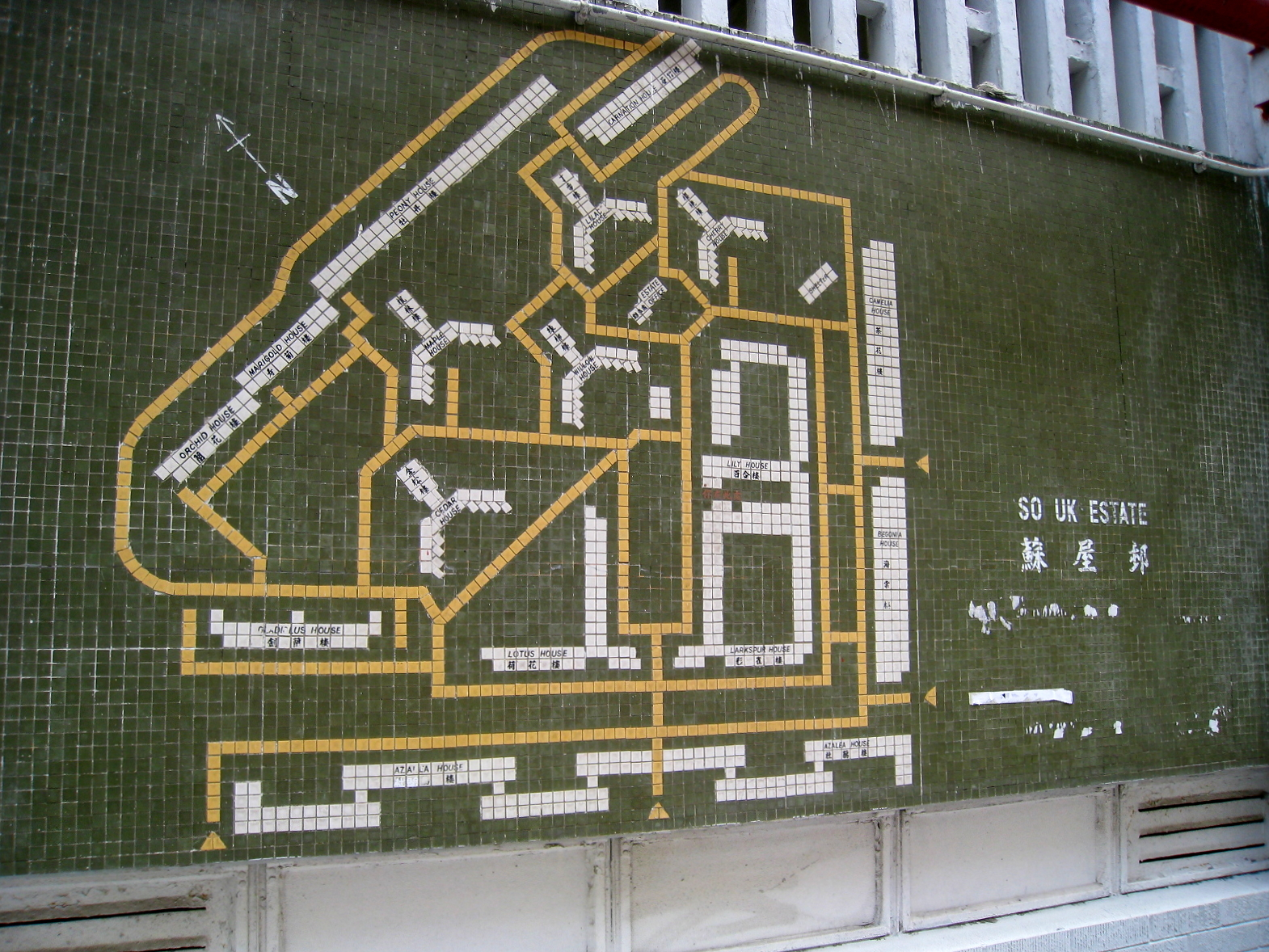
So Uk Estate Mosaic Map

=== First generation ===
The estate was built on the site of squatter areas which were demolished for the construction of the estate of 16 blocks from 1955–1963. The blocks were called "Houses" and named after varieties of flowers. The architectural design of the estate was unique in Hong Kong. There were 5,316 flats in the original estate, with areas ranging from 19.5 to 49.1m^{2}, with capacity of 15,200.

Planning of the estate was carried out by Eric Cumine, with buildings designed by Luke Him Sau, Chau & Lee and Leigh & Orange.

The estate was the home of many famous individuals during their youth in Hong Kong, for example, Sam Hui and his brothers, Wong Ka Kui and his brother in the band Beyond, and many others.

=== Second generation ===
By 2008, after 48 years, the estate was still in good condition but its estimated high maintenance cost made the Hong Kong Housing Authority decide to demolish the six blocks in March 2012. The Authority offered compensation and removal assistance to residents. It allowed residents the option of moving into Un Chau Estate Phases 2, 4, and 5 in Sham Shui Po.

A foundation titled, "Farewell So Uk" was established as a historical archive for the Estate and to document its history of its residents. It was sponsored by the Salvation Army of Hong Kong and the Salisbury YMCA.

As of 2015, construction of the new So Uk Estate was well underway. The new estate would comprise 14 blocks ranging from 21 to 41 storeys high with nearly 7,000 flats. The Housing Department won a Merit Award from the Hong Kong Institute of Urban Design in 2014 for their community-minded redevelopment approach.

The first phase of the redevelopment was completed in August 2016 and the intake of the first tenants was to commence at the end of September 2016.

== Blocks ==
=== Old generation ===
==== Buildings closed / demolished before 2012 ====
- Cedar House (金松樓)
- Cherry House (櫻桃樓)
- Orchid House (蘭花樓)
- Gladiolus House (劍蘭樓)
- Carnation House (石竹樓)
- Peony House (牡丹樓)
- Maple House (楓林樓)
- Willow House (綠柳樓)
- Marigold House (壽菊樓)
- Lilac House (丁香樓)

==== Buildings closed in 2012 ====
- Azalea House (杜鵑樓)
- Begonia House (海棠樓)
- Camelia House (茶花樓)
- Larkspur House (彩雀樓)
- Lily House (百合樓)
- Lotus House (荷花樓)

=== New generation ===
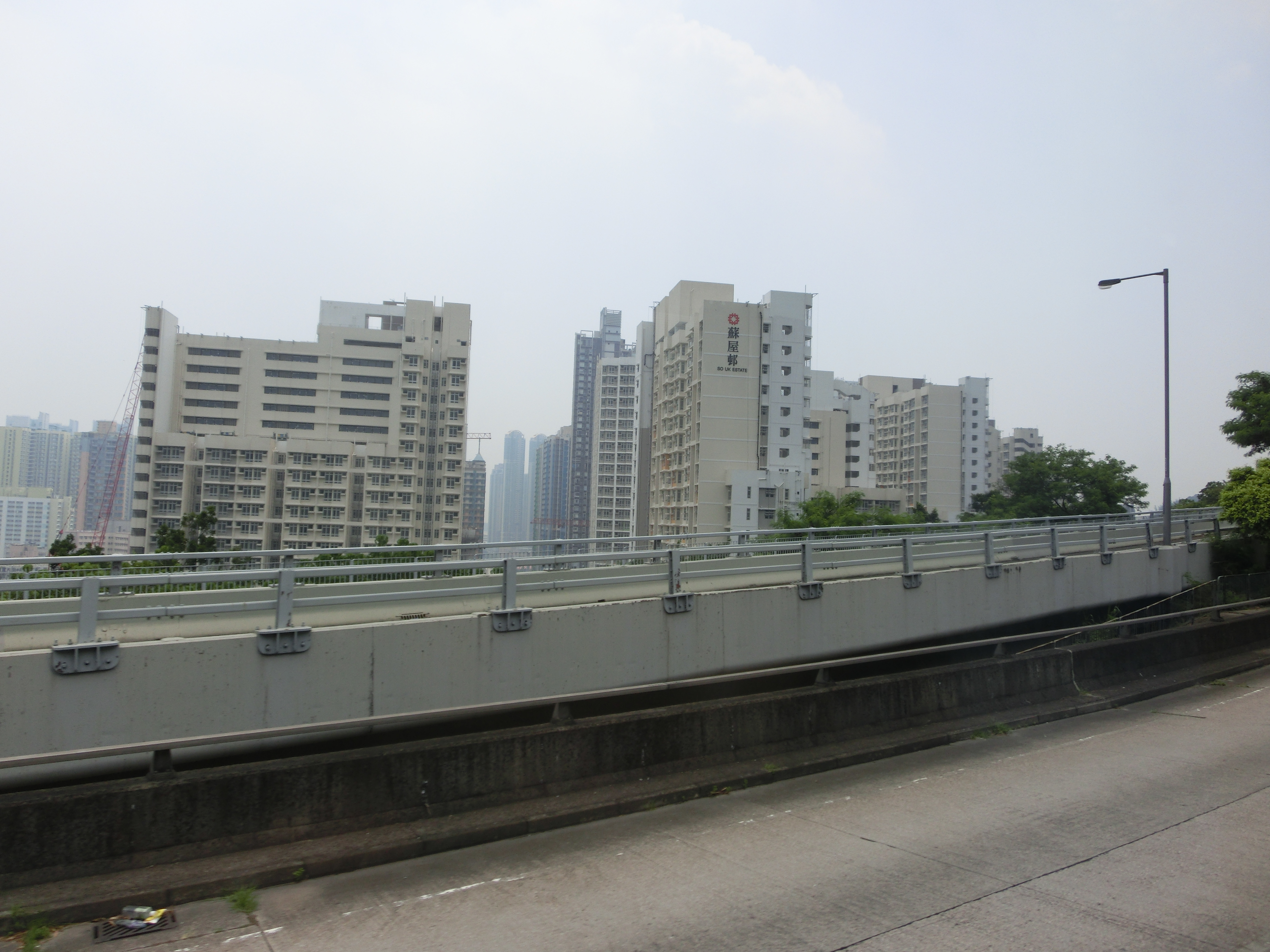
Phase 1

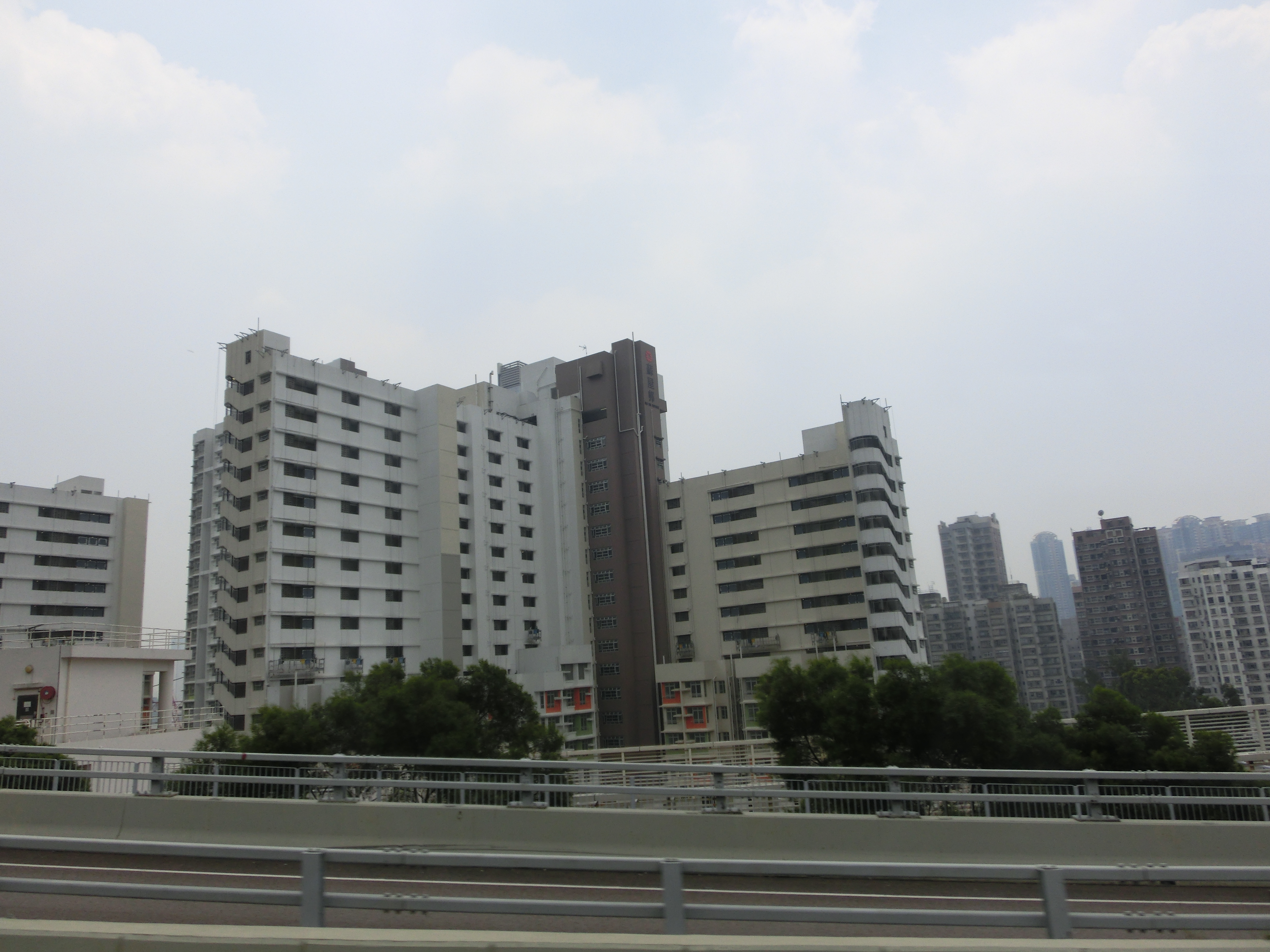
Orchid House

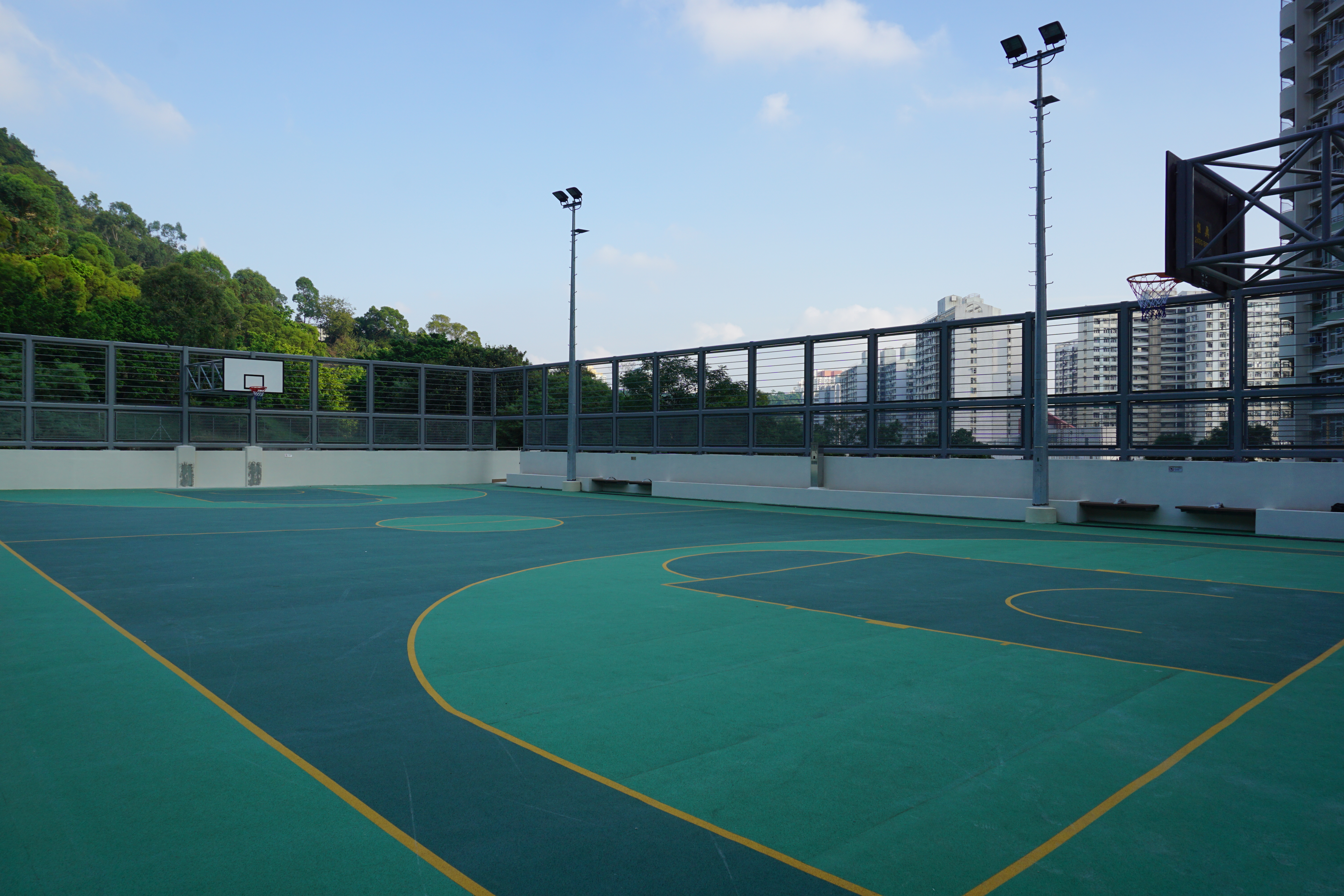
Basketball court

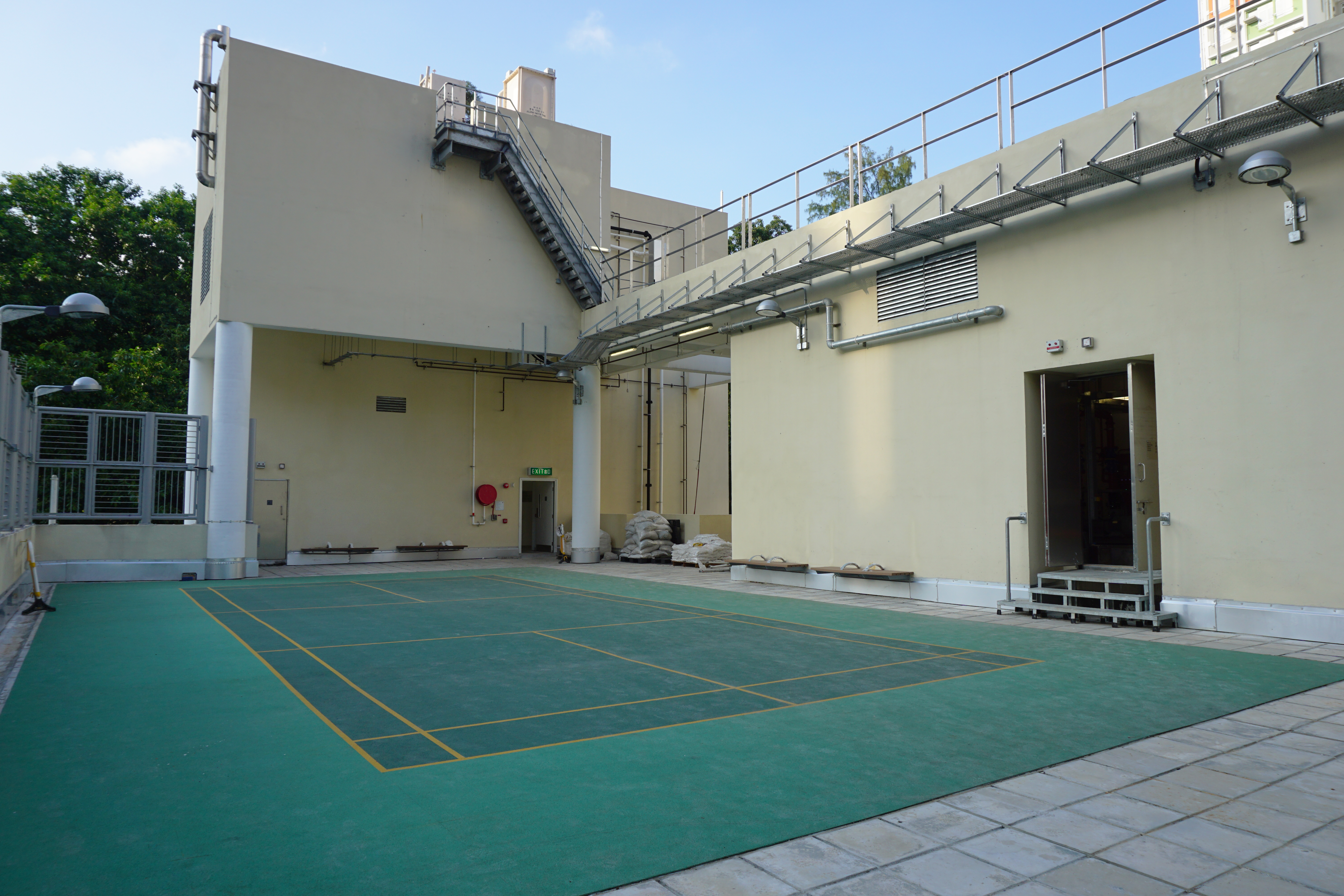
Badminton court

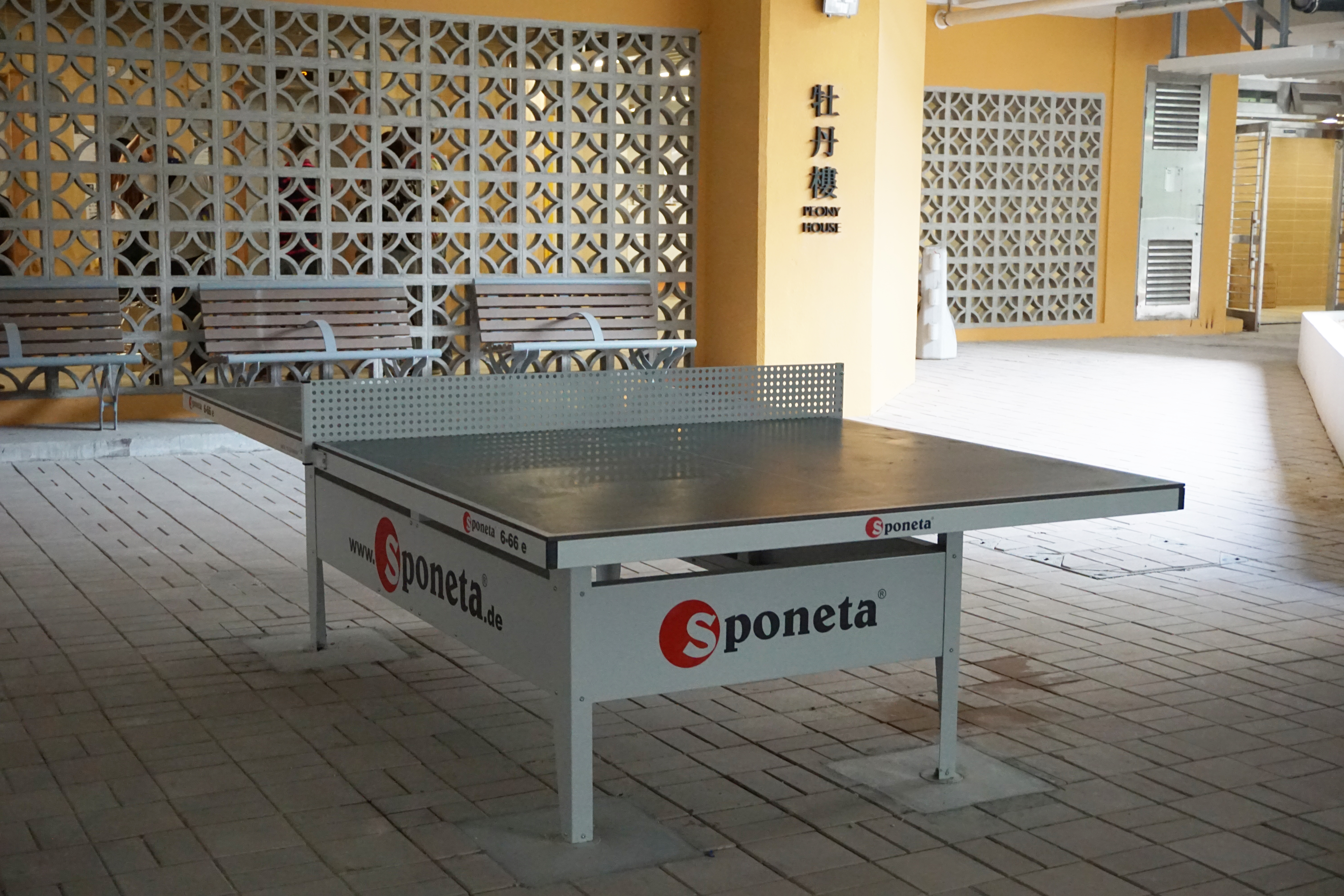
Table Tennis Play Area in Peony House

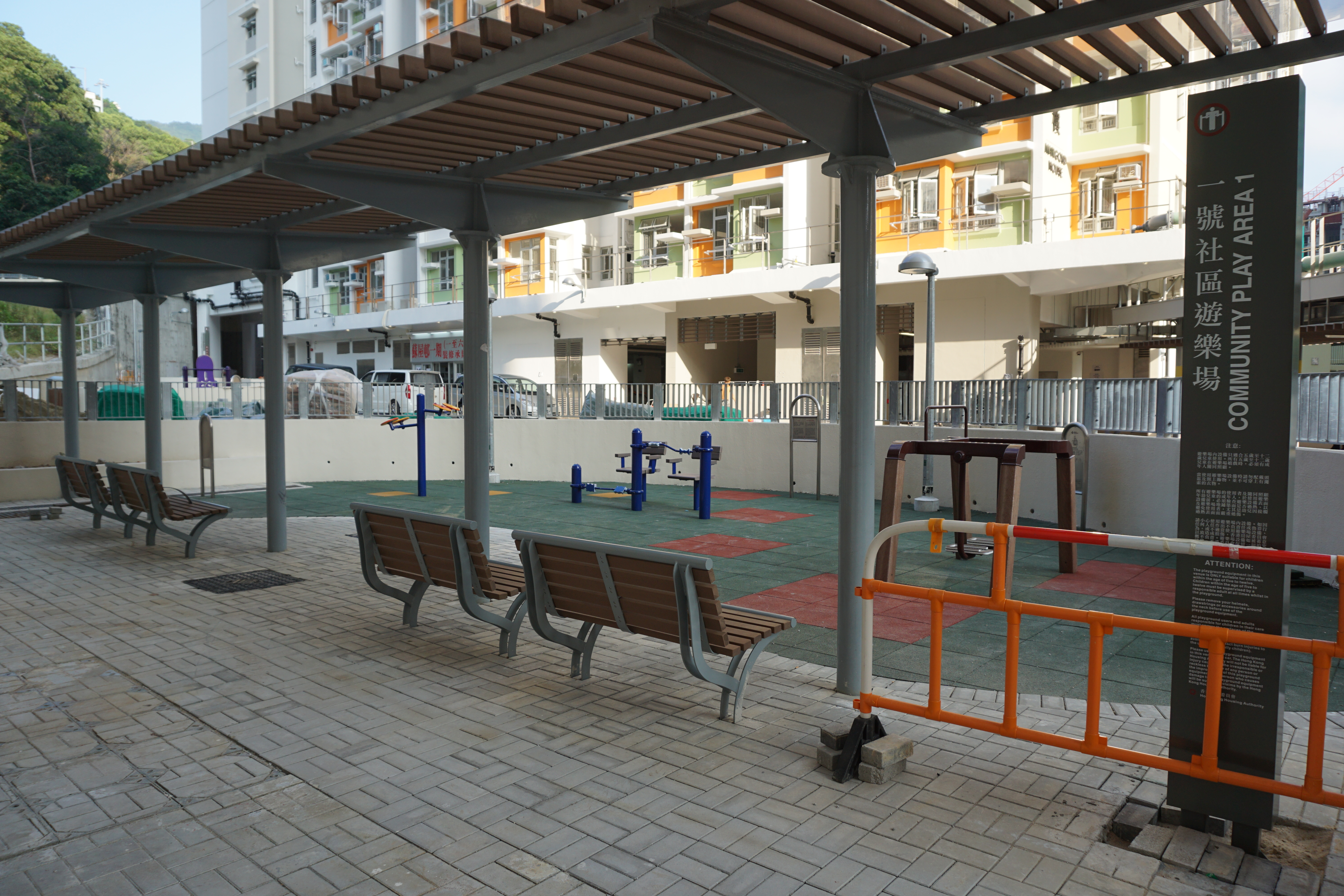
Community Play Area

The redeveloped estate comprises 14 blocks of 21-41 storeys each. The buildings reuse most of the names of the earlier blocks.

English name	Chinese name	Building type	Floors	Phase	Completion
Orchid House (Block 1)	蘭花樓	Non-standard block (L-Shaped)	23	1	September 2016
Marigold House (Block 2)	壽菊樓	Non-standard block (Z-Shaped)	23	1	September 2016
Peony House (Block 3)	牡丹樓	Non-standard block (Z-Shaped)	22	1	September 2016
Cedar House (Block 4)	金松樓	Non-standard block (L-Shaped)	29	1	September 2016
Willow House (Block 5)	綠柳樓	Non-standard block (L-Shaped)	29	1	September 2016
Cherry House (Block 6)	櫻桃樓	Non-standard block (L-Shaped)	25	1	September 2016
Amenity and Community Building (Block 10)	社區綜合服務大樓及辦事處大樓	N/A	7	1	September 2016
Camellia House (Block 14)	茶花樓	Non-standard block (Linear Block)	21	1	August 2018
Lotus House (Block 7)	荷花樓	Non-standard block (T-Shaped)	39	2	February 2019
Lily House (Block 8)	百合樓	Non-standard block (T-Shaped)	40	2	February 2019
Larkspur House (Block 9)	彩雀樓	Non-standard block (T-Shaped)	27	2	February 2019
Gladiolus House (Block 11A)	劍蘭樓	Non-standard block (T-Shaped)	22	2	February 2019
Carnation House (Block 11B)	石竹樓	Non-standard block (T-Shaped)	22	2	February 2019
Azalea House (Block 12)	杜鵑樓	Non-standard block (Linear Block)	22	2	February 2019
Begonia House (Block 13)	海棠樓	Non-standard block (Linear Block)	22	2	February 2019
Commercial centre (So Uk Shopping Centre)	蘇屋商場	N/A	2	2	February 2019

== Estate facilities ==
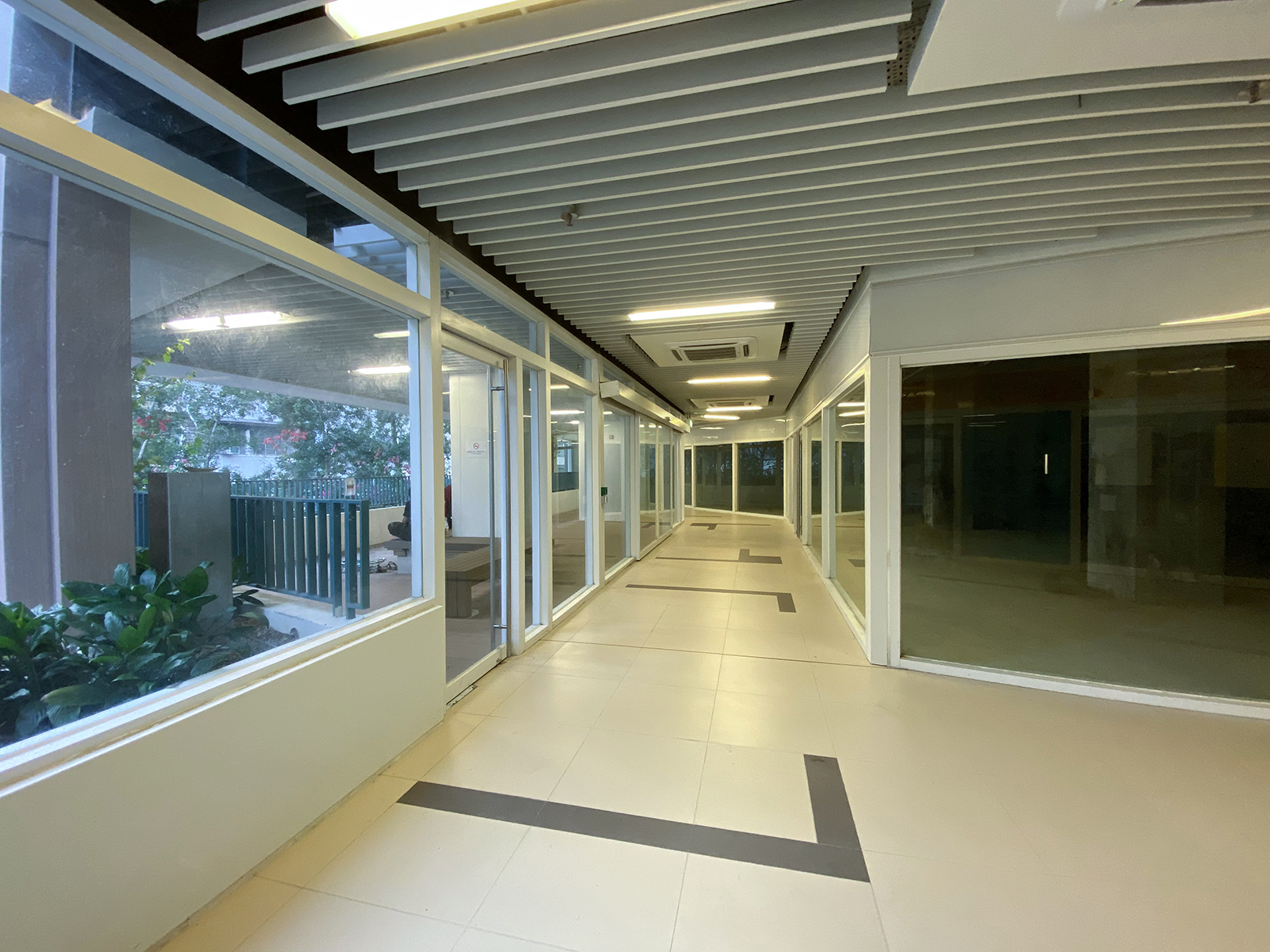
Some shops on the first floor of So Um Shopping Centre are still vacant

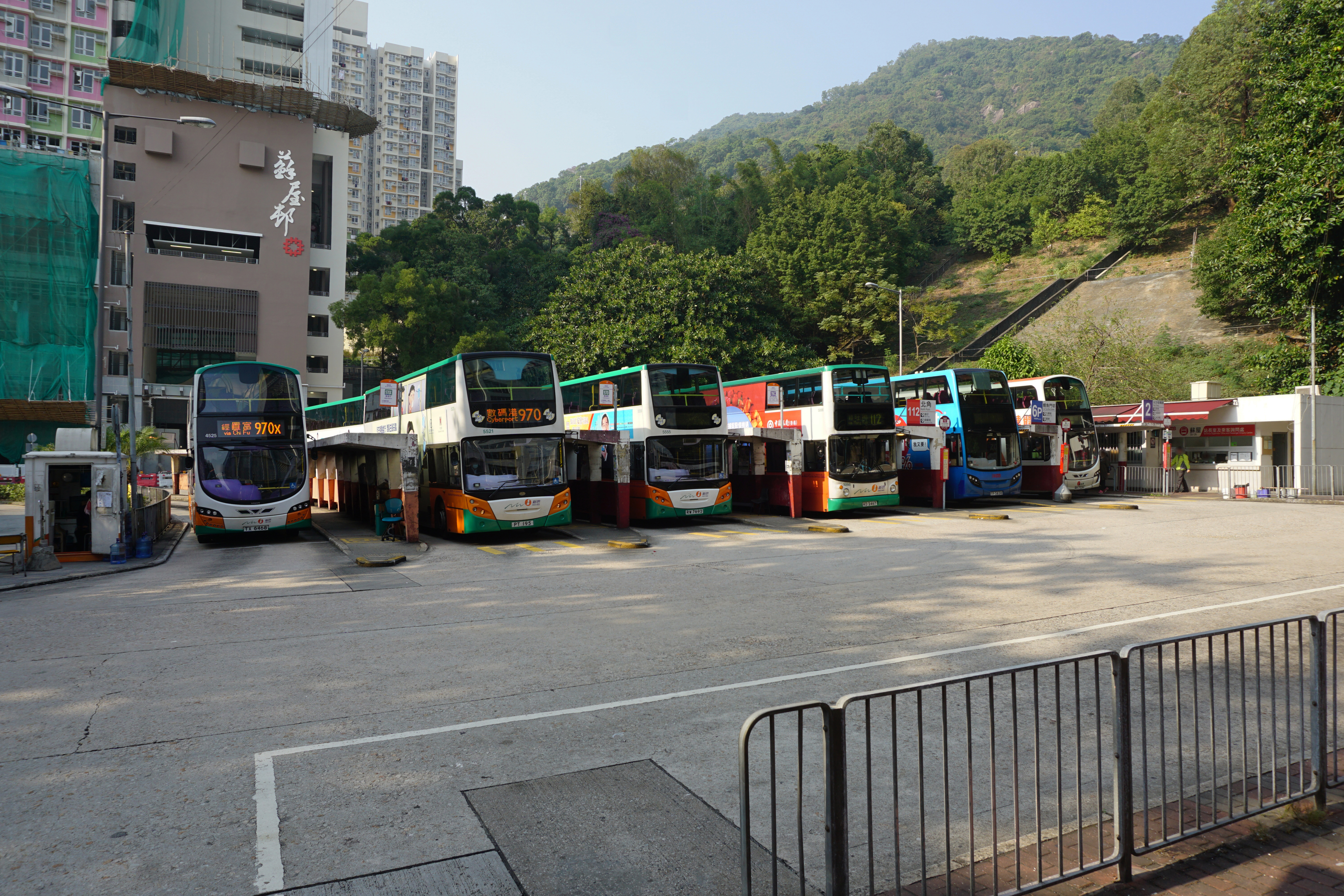
So Uk Bus Station

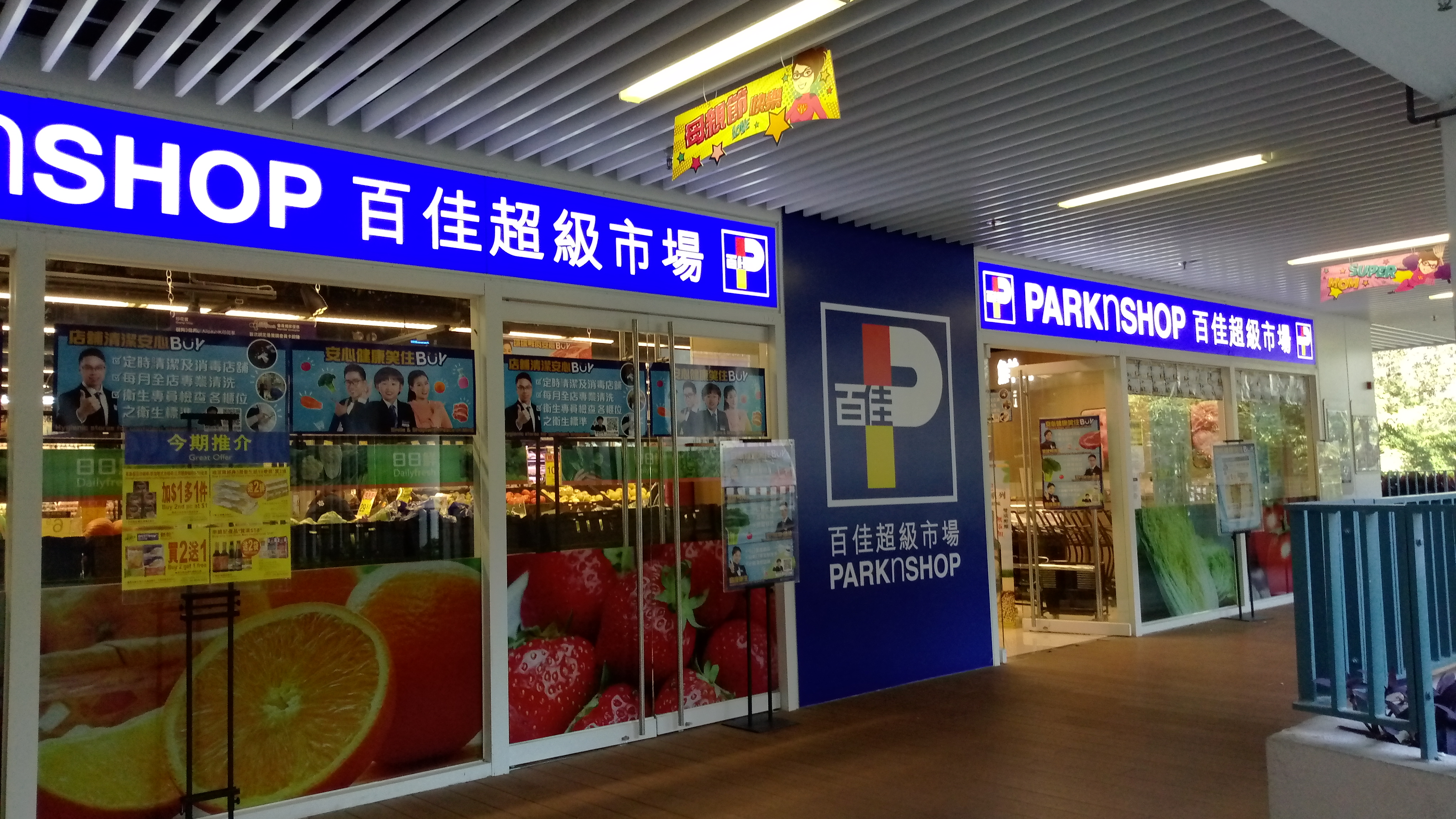
ParknShop branch of So Uk Shopping Centre

These include special child care centers and early education and training centers, children's homes, nursing homes for severely disabled people, comprehensive vocational rehabilitation service centers, dormitories for moderate and severely mentally handicapped persons, performance centers, children's playgrounds, basketball courts, badminton courts and parking lot. The former estate office was leased to post office for a nominal rent to replace the unrenewed Lei Cheng Uk Shopping Centre post office.

The estate has a shopping mall and is named So Uk Shopping Centre, located at the junction of Po On Road / Cheung Fat Street. The shopping mall is two floors high, with restaurants, convenience stores, restaurants, supermarkets, hair salons and other facilities. But some stores are still vacant. Schools adjacent to the estate include San Wui Commercial Society YMCA of Hong Kong Christian School etc.

== Transport ==
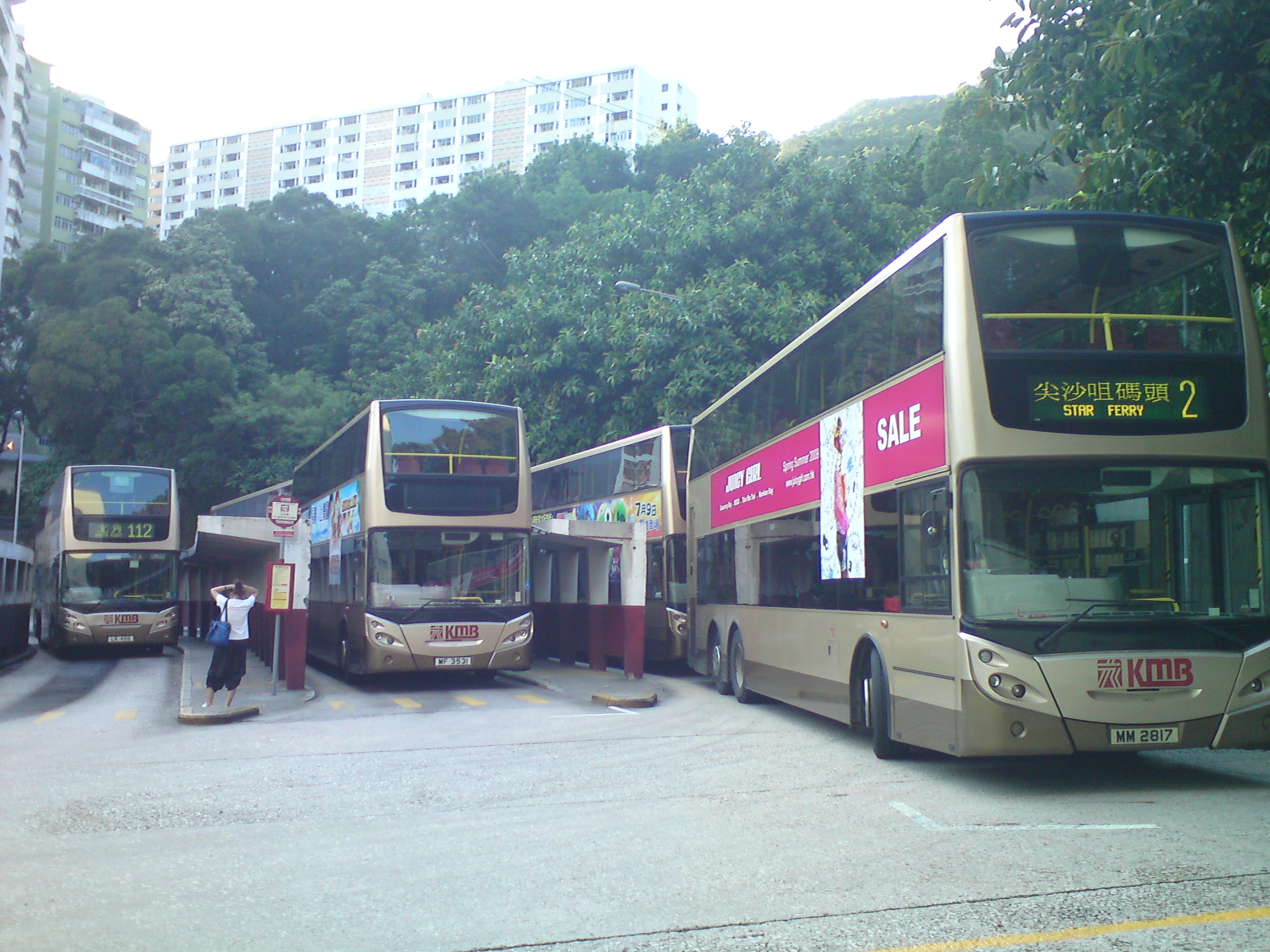
So Uk Bus Terminus

The estate is adjacent to the So Uk Bus Terminus, which has remained open throughout redevelopment of the estate. It is served by several Kowloon Motor Bus and First Bus routes.

So Uk Estate is also within walking distance of Cheung Sha Wan station of the Mass Transit Railway (MTR).

== See also ==
- Public housing estates in Cheung Sha Wan
