= Po Lai (constituency) =

Local constituency in Hong Kong

- Elected constituency for the Sham Shui Po District Council
- Boundary of Po Lai in Sham Shui Po District
- District: Sham Shui Po
- Legislative Council constituency: Kowloon West
- Population: 18,284 (2019)
- Electorate: 7,807 (2019)

Current constituency
- Created: 1994
- Number of members: One
- Member: Mak Wai-ming (Independent)

Po Lai (Chinese: 寶麗) is one of the 25 constituencies in the Sham Shui Po District of Hong Kong which was created in 1994.

The constituency loosely covers Po Lai Court and Po Hei Court and part of Un Chau Estate in Cheung Sha Wan with the estimated population of 18,284.

== Councillors represented ==
Election	Member	Party
1994	Leung Yau-fong	ADPL
2019	Mak Wai-ming	Independent

== Election results ==
=== 2010s ===
Sham Shui Po District Council Election, 2019: Po Lai
Party	Candidate	Votes	%	±%
ADPL	Mak Wai-ming	3,517	63.96	+10.27
BPA	Tam Chun-yu	1,860	33.82	
Nonpartisan	Foo Wai-lok	122	2.22	
Majority		1,657	30.14	
Turnout		5,528	70.85	
ADPL hold		Swing		

Sham Shui Po District Council Election, 2015: Po Lai
Party	Candidate	Votes	%	±%
ADPL	Leung Yau-fong	1,929	53.69	+4.21
Independent	Tse Hiu-hung	1,664	46.31	
Majority		265	7.38	
Turnout		3,593	47.90	
ADPL hold		Swing		

Sham Shui Po District Council Election, 2011: Po Lai
Party	Candidate	Votes	%	±%
ADPL	Leung Yau-fong	1,048	49.48	−10.71
Independent	So Chun-man	883	41.69	+1.88
People Power	Lau Tit-wai	187	8.83	
Majority		165	7.79	
Turnout		2,118	42.19	
ADPL hold		Swing		

=== 2000s ===
Sham Shui Po District Council Election, 2007: Po Lai
Party	Candidate	Votes	%	±%
ADPL	Leung Yau-fong	960	60.19	−16.42
Independent	So Chun-man	635	39.81	
Majority		325	20.38	
ADPL hold		Swing		

Sham Shui Po District Council Election, 2003: Po Lai
Party	Candidate	Votes	%	±%
ADPL	Leung Yau-fong	1,317	76.61	+12.06
DAB	Ma Yiu-chun	402	24.39	+7.09
Majority		915	12.22	
ADPL hold		Swing		

=== 1990s ===
Sham Shui Po District Council Election, 1999: Po Lai
Party	Candidate	Votes	%	±%
ADPL	Leung Yau-fong	905	54.55	+8.01
Democratic	Yim Chun-ming	467	28.15	
DAB	Yung Hoi	287	17.30	
Majority		438	26.40	
ADPL hold		Swing		

Sham Shui Po District Board Election, 1994: Po Lai
Party	Candidate	Votes	%	±%
ADPL	Leung Yau-fong	552	46.54	
SSPRA	Lai Pak-yin	332	27.99	
Liberal	Wong Chin-hiu	259	21.84	
Independent	Wong Wai-man	43	3.63	
Majority		220	18.55	
ADPL win (new seat)				
