= Cheung Sha Wan Estate =

Public housing estate in Cheung Sha Wan, Hong Kong

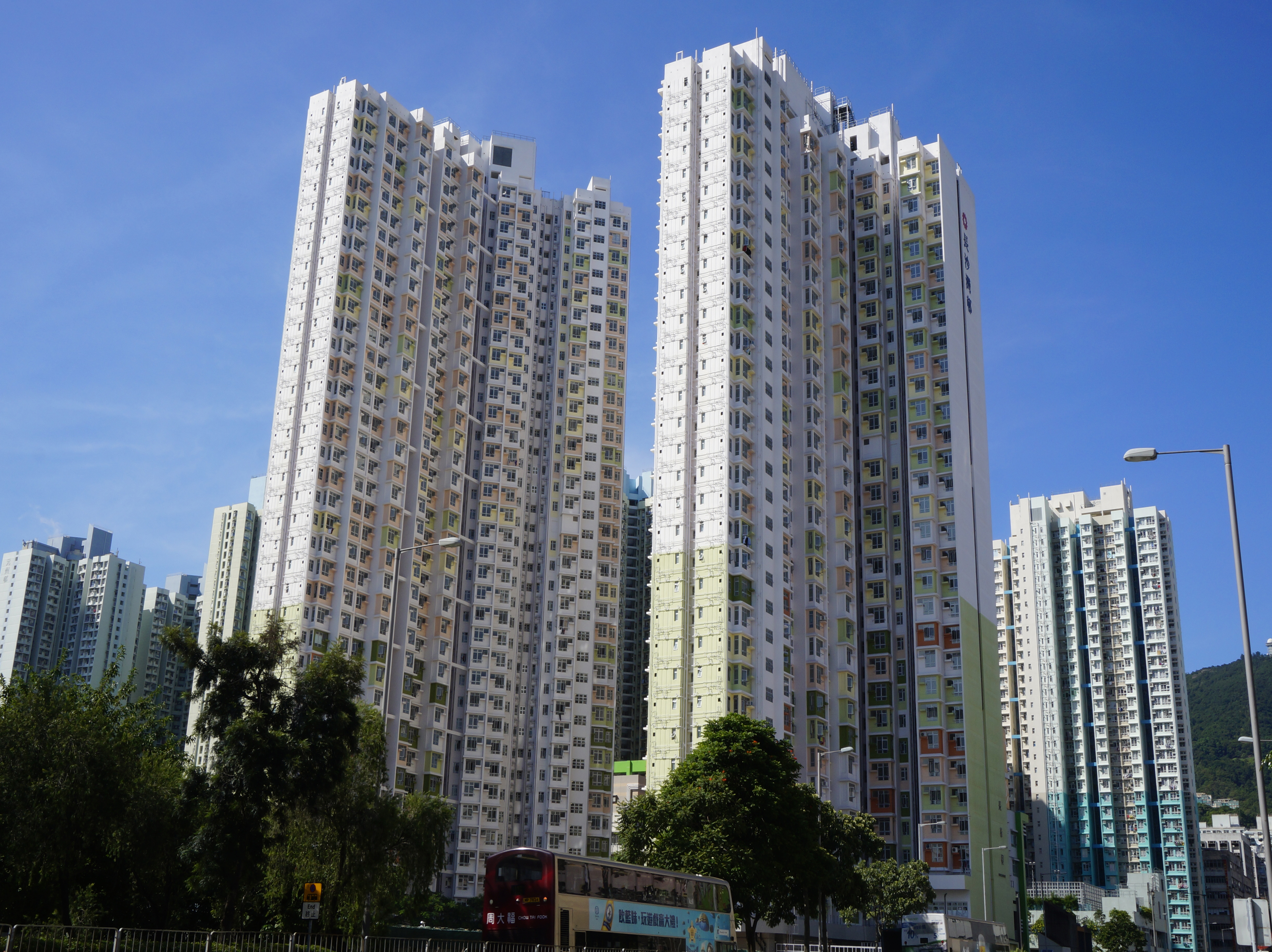
- Cheung Sha Wan Estate
- Interactive map of Cheung Sha Wan Estate

General information
- Location: 9 Tonkin Street, Cheung Sha Wan; Kowloon, Hong Kong
- Coordinates: 22.3345321°N 114.1562719°E
- Status: Completed
- Category: Public rental housing
- Population: 3,344 (2016)
- No. of blocks: 2
- No. of units: 1,400

Construction
- Constructed: 2013; 13 years ago
- Authority: Hong Kong Housing Authority

Cheung Sha Wan Estate (Chinese: 長沙灣邨) is a public housing estate in Cheung Sha Wan, Kowloon, Hong Kong, built on the site of the former Cheung Sha Wan Police Married Quarters near Cheung Sha Wan station. The estate consists of two residential blocks and an auxiliary facilities block linked to Un Chau Estate by a walkway spanning Cheung Sha Wan Road completed in 2013.

== Background ==
The original Cheung Sha Wan Estate opened between 1963 and 1964 as the Cheung Sha Wan Government Low Cost Housing Estate (Chinese: 長沙灣政府廉租屋邨). It was renamed following the 1973 establishment of the Housing Authority. All thirteen blocks of this estate were demolished in 2001 as part of the Comprehensive Redevelopment Programme, announced in 1995. Most displaced residents were moved to the nearby Fortune Estate.

A new estate opened in 2013 bearing the same name located just north of the original Cheung Sha Wan Estate site.

The site of the original Cheung Sha Wan Estate was leased to the Asia Golf Club driving range. The golf club has since closed and a new public housing estate is under construction on the site. This new estate is called Lai Tsui Court.

== Houses ==
Name	Chinese name	Building type	Completed
Cheung Yan House	長欣樓	Non-standard	2013
Cheung Tai House	長泰樓	Non-standard	2013

== Demographics ==
According to the 2016 by-census, Cheung Sha Wan Estate had a population of 3,344. The median age was 48 and the majority of residents (98.9 per cent) were of Chinese ethnicity. The average household size was 2.4 people. The median monthly household income of all households (i.e. including both economically active and inactive households) was HK$15,000.

== Politics ==
Cheung Sha Wan Estate is located in Fortune constituency of the Sham Shui Po District Council. It was formerly represented by Ronald Tsui Yat-sin, who was elected in the 2019 elections until July 2021.

== See also ==
- Public housing estates in Cheung Sha Wan
