= Lai Tsui Court =

Housing estate in Cheung Sha Wan, Hong Kong

- Chinese: 麗翠苑
- Cantonese Yale: laih cheui yún
Transcriptions
Yue: Cantonese
- Yale Romanization: laih cheui yún
- Jyutping: lai6 ceoi3 jyun2

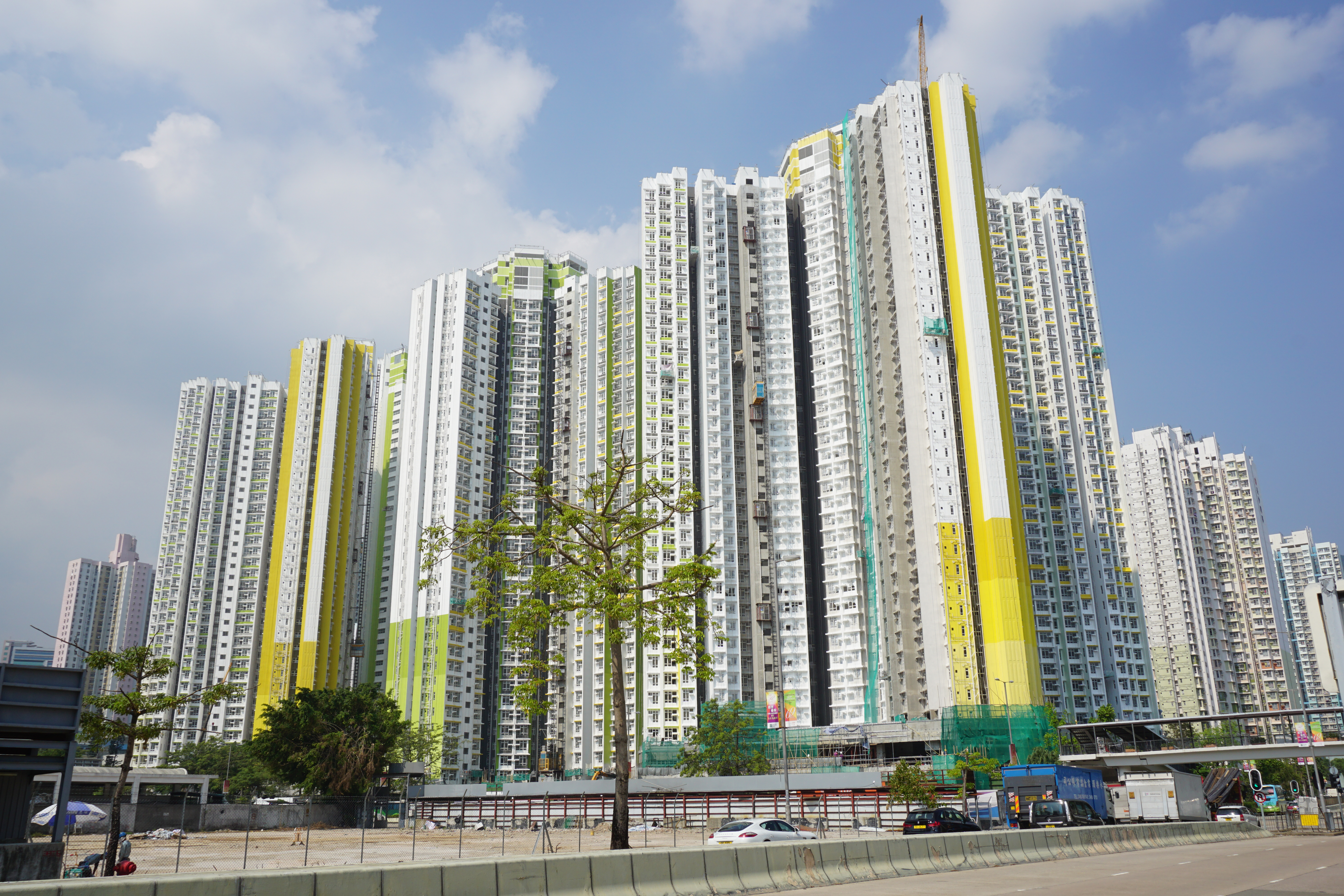
Lai Tsui Court

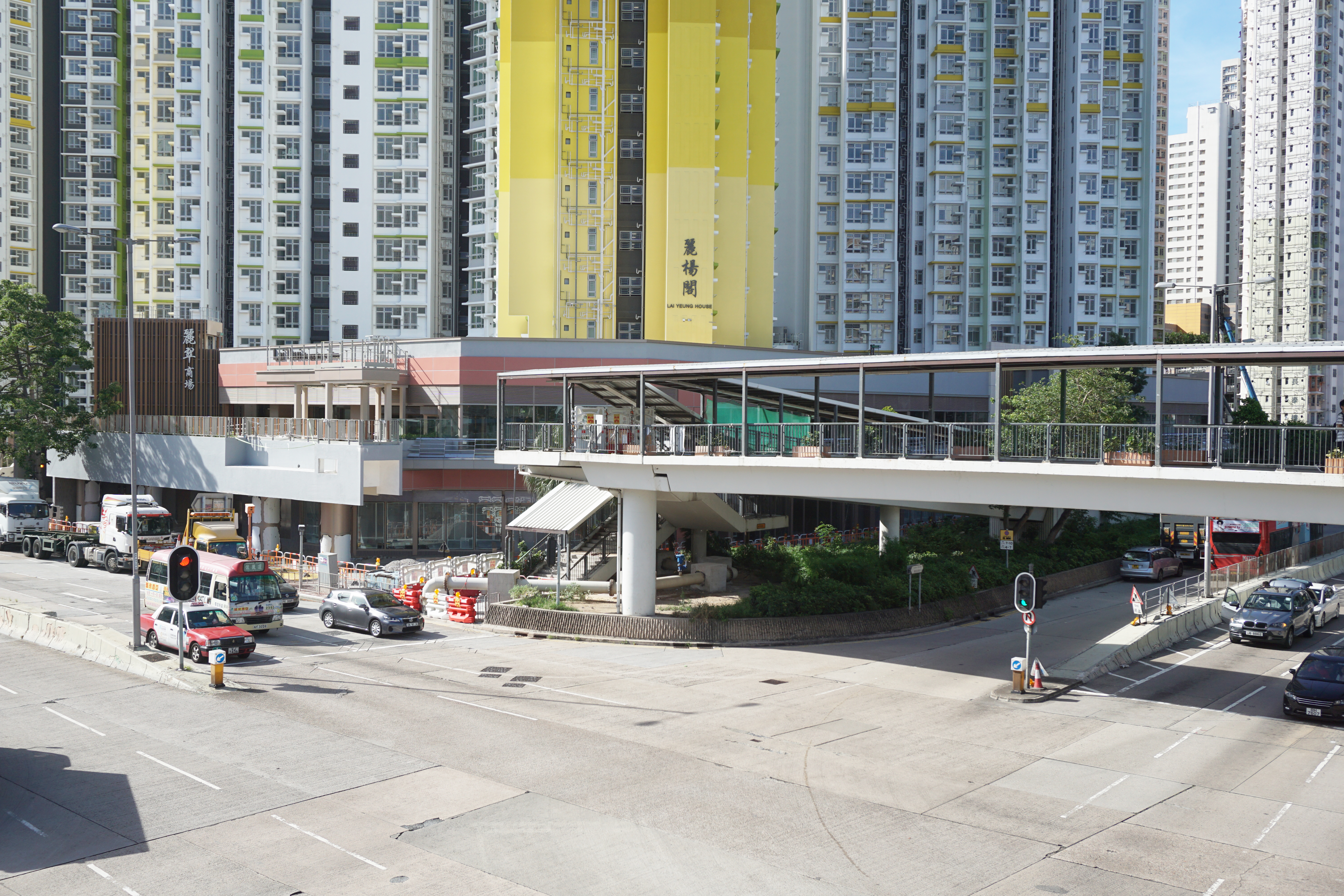
Lai Tsui Shopping Centre

Lai Tsui Court (Chinese: 麗翠苑), former name Lai Chi Estate (Chinese: 麗智邨), is the second Green Form Subsidised Home Ownership Scheme (GFSHOS) court and a public rental housing (PRH) at the junction of Lai Chi Kok Road and Tonkin Street in Cheung Sha Wan of Sham Shui Po District. It was formerly the site of the demolished Cheung Sha Wan Estate and just next to MTR Cheung Sha Wan station and Fortune Estate.

GFSHOS part comprises 6 blocks (i.e. Blocks A to F) with totally 2,545 flats at the saleable areas ranging from about 17.1 square metres to about 42 square metres. By applying a discount of 58 per cent to assessed market values, the average selling price was HK$6,243 per square foot of saleable area. The selling price of the flats ranged from HK$932,500 to HK$3,062,100. All the flats were sold out in 2019.

== Houses ==
Name	Type	Completion	Usage
Lai Sum House (Block 1)	Non-standard	2019	GFSHOS
Lai Yung House (Block 2)	Non-standard	2019	GFSHOS
Lai Tong House (Block 3)	Non-standard	2019	GFSHOS
Lai Kei House (Block 4)	Non-standard	2019	GFSHOS
Lai Pak House (Block 5)	Non-standard	2019	PRH
Lai Yeung House (Block 6)	Non-standard	2019	PRH

== COVID-19 pandemic ==
Lai Tong House was placed lockdown on 23 February 2022. Lai Pak House was sealed off for mandatory testing between 24 & 25 February.

== Nearby Buildings ==
- Cheung Sha Wan station
- Fortune Estate
- Un Chau Estate
- Cheung Sha Wan Estate
