= Public housing estates in Cheung Sha Wan =

Public housing in Cheung Sha Wan, Hong Kong

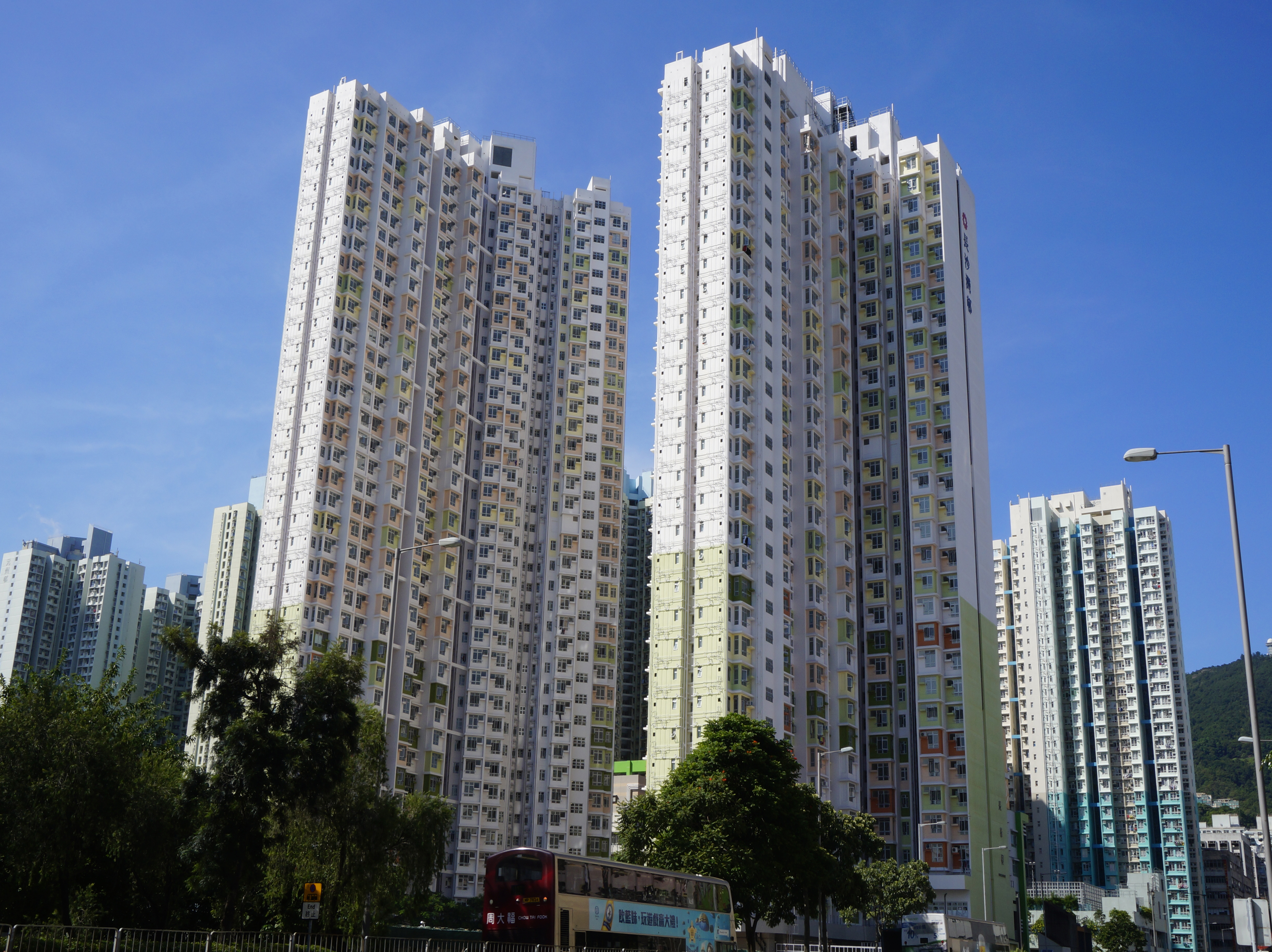
New Cheung Sha Wan Estate, completed 2013

The following is an overview of Public housing estates in Cheung Sha Wan, Hong Kong, including Home Ownership Scheme (HOS), Green Form Subsidised Home Ownership Scheme (GFSHOS), Private Sector Participation Scheme (PSPS), and Tenants Purchase Scheme (TPS) estates.

== History ==
Historians suggested there were inhabitants settled in this area during Eastern Han Dynasty ( 25 A.D-220 A.D ), as an Eastern Han tomb was discovered in the year 1955, the Eastern Han tomb now become Lee Cheng Uk Museum (Chinese: 李鄭屋東漢墓博物館) when Lee Cheng Uk Estate (Chinese: 李鄭屋邨) was built.

== Overview ==
Name		Type	Inaug.	No Blocks	No Units	Notes
Cheung Sha Wan Estate (new)	長沙灣邨	Public	2013	2	1,400	Original estate demolished 2001
Fortune Estate	幸福邨	Public	2000	3	2,125	
Hang Chun Court	幸俊苑	HOS	2001	2	740	
Hoi Lai Estate	海麗邨	Public	2004	12	4,908	
Hoi Lok Court	凱樂苑	HOS	2019	5	2,522	
Hoi Tak Court	凱德苑	HOS	2020	1	814	
Lai Tsui Court	麗翠苑	Public/GFSHOS	2019	4 (GFSHOS); 2 (Public)	2,545 (GFSHOS); 1,305 (Public)	
Lei Cheng Uk Estate	李鄭屋邨	TPS	1984	10	1,608	
Po Hei Court	寶熙苑	HOS	1993	2	390	
Po Lai Court	寶麗苑	HOS	1987	3	378	
So Uk Estate	蘇屋邨	Public	1960	16	5,316	
Un Chau Estate	元州邨	Public	1998	5	2,797	

== Cheung Sha Wan Estate ==
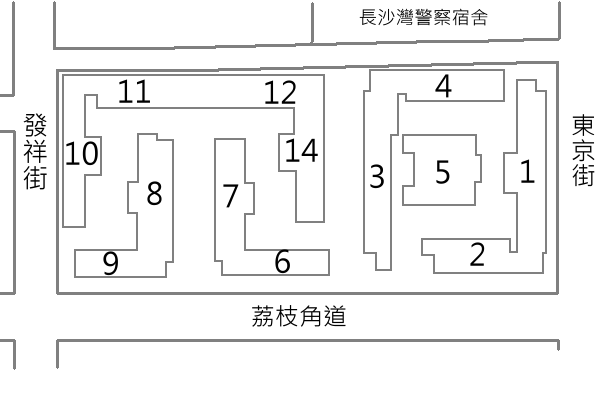
Layout of the original (demolished) estate

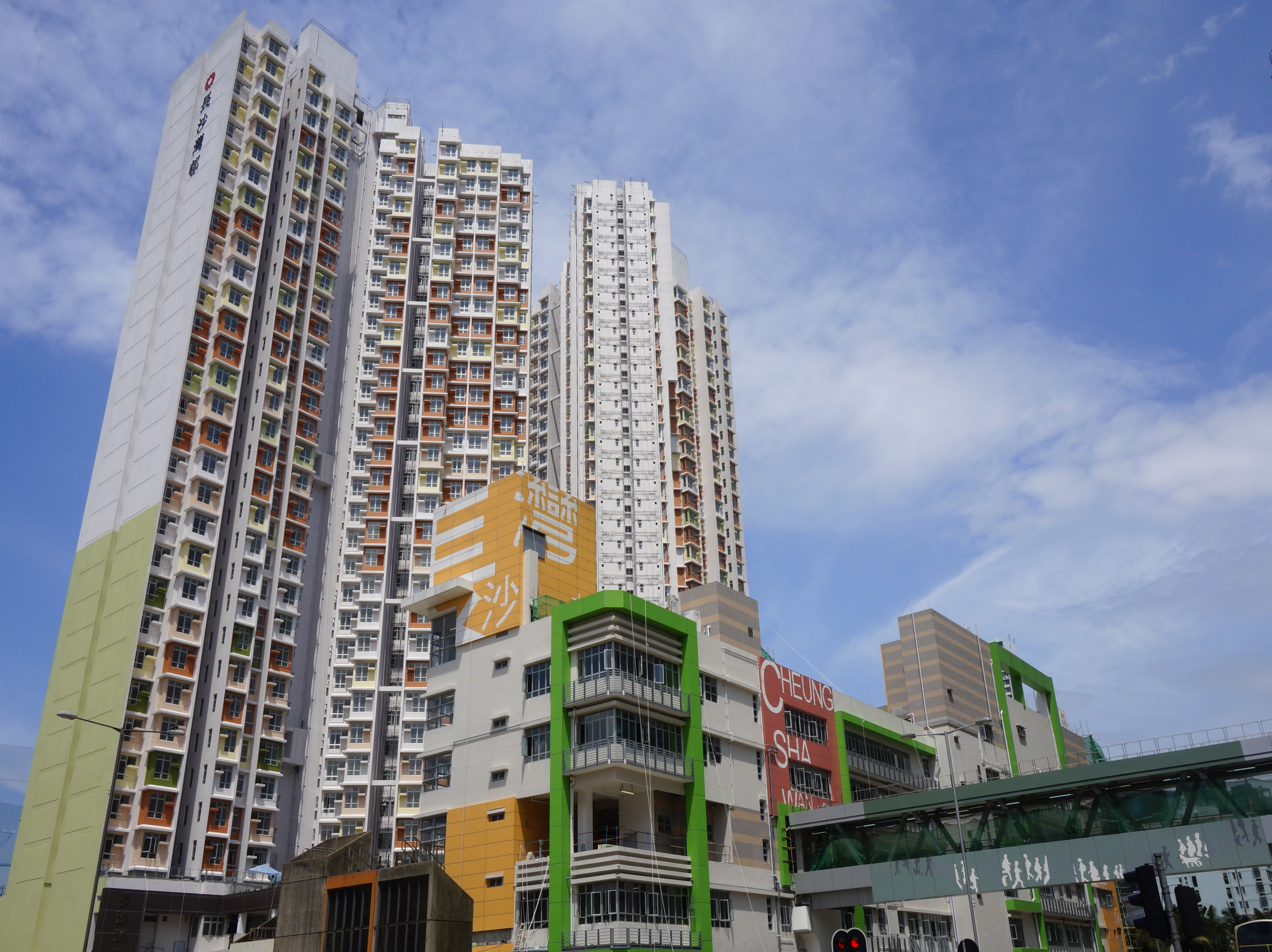
The new estate as seen from Cheung Sha Wan Road

The original Cheung Sha Wan Estate (Chinese: 長沙灣邨) opened between 1963 and 1964 as the Cheung Sha Wan Government Low Cost Housing Estate (Chinese: 長沙灣政府廉租屋邨). It was renamed following the 1973 establishment of the Housing Authority. All thirteen blocks of this estate were demolished in 2001 as part of the Comprehensive Redevelopment Programme, announced 1995. Most displaced residents were moved to the nearby Fortune Estate.

A new estate opened in 2013 bearing the same name. It sits just north of the original Cheung Sha Wan Estate site, on the site of the former Cheung Sha Wan Police Married Quarters. It is made up of two public rental blocks and an auxiliary facilities block linked to Un Chau Estate by a walkway spanning Cheung Sha Wan Road.

The site of the original Cheung Sha Wan Estate was leased to the Asia Golf Club driving range. The golf club has since closed and a new public housing estate is under construction on the site. This new estate is called Lai Tsui Court.

=== Houses ===
Name	Type	Completion	Demolition
Cheung Yan House	Non-standard block	2013	
Cheung Tai House	Non-standard block	2013	
Block 1	Old Low Cost Housing Block	1964	2001
Block 2	Old Low Cost Housing Block	1964	2001
Block 3	Old Low Cost Housing Block	1964	2001
Block 4	Old Low Cost Housing Block	1964	2001
Block 5	Old Low Cost Housing Block	1964	2001
Block 6	Old Low Cost Housing Block	1964	2001
Block 7	Old Low Cost Housing Block	1964	2001
Block 8	Old Low Cost Housing Block	1964	2001
Block 9	Old Low Cost Housing Block	1964	2001
Block 10	Old Low Cost Housing Block	1964	2001
Block 11	Old Low Cost Housing Block	1964	2001
Block 12	Old Low Cost Housing Block	1964	2001
Block 14	Old Low Cost Housing Block	1964	2001

== Fortune Estate ==
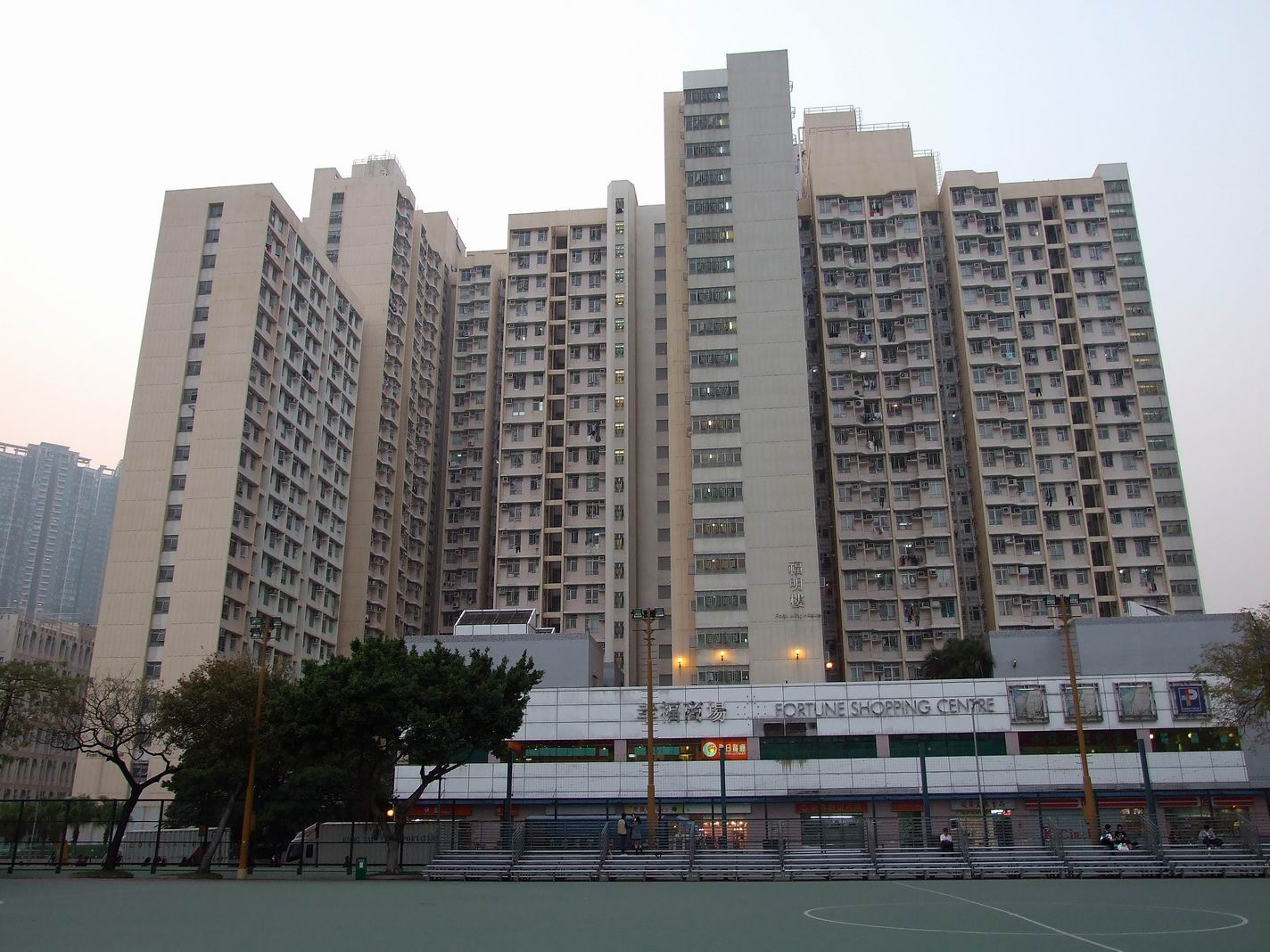
Fortune Estate

Fortune Estate (Chinese: 幸福邨) is located opposite to Un Chau Estate and near Cheung Sha Wan station. Formerly the site of Fortune Street Temporary Housing Area, the estate consists of three residential buildings built in 2001 to settle the residents affected by the redevelopment of Cheung Sha Wan Estate, Tai Hang Tung Estate and Un Chau Estate.

=== Houses ===
Name	Type	Completion
Fook Ming House	Small Household Block	2001
Fook Yuet House	Special Harmony Block	2001
Fook Yat House	Harmony 1	2001

== Hang Chun Court ==
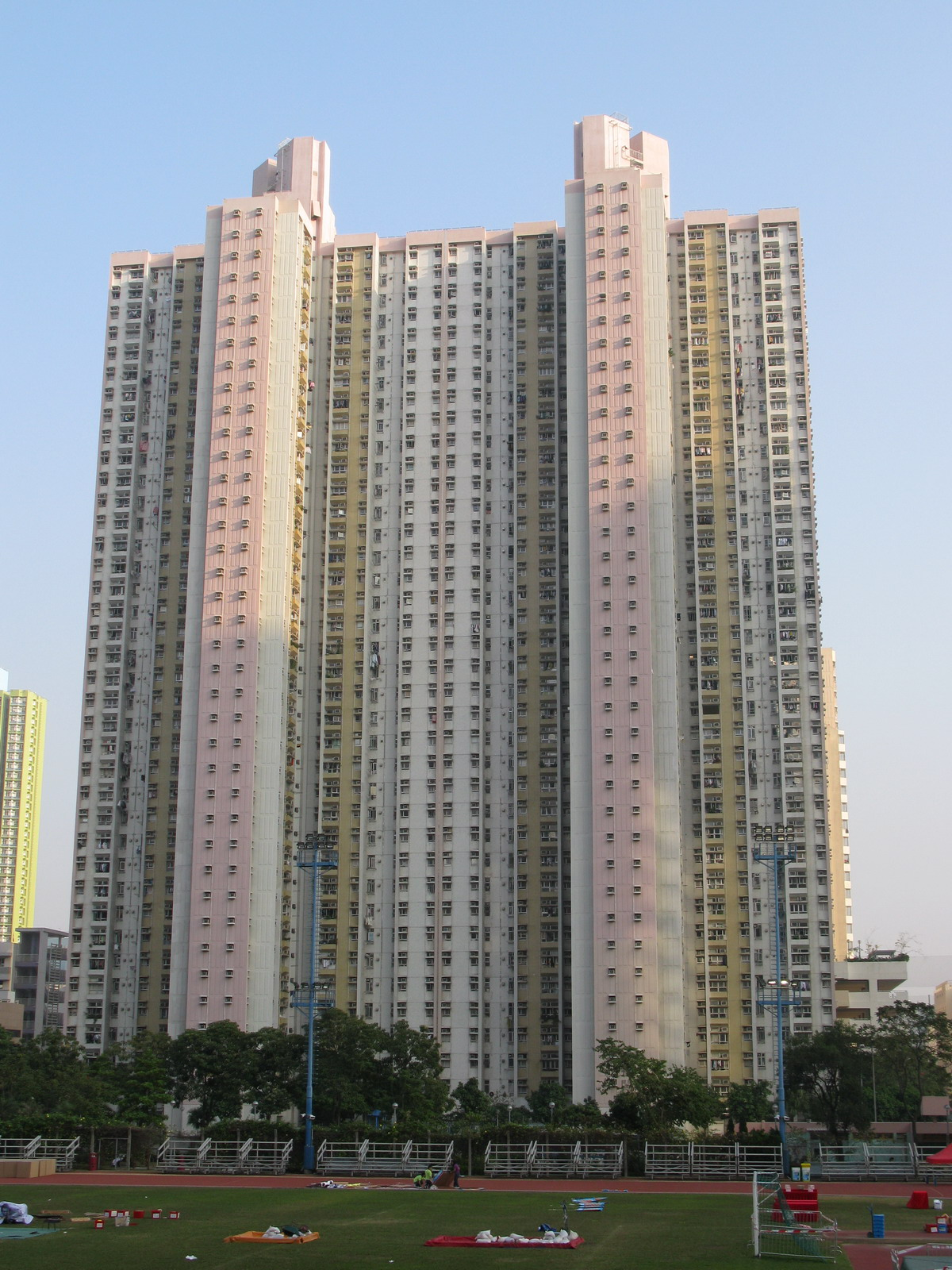
Hang Chun Court

Hang Chun Court (Chinese: 幸俊苑) is a HOS court in Cheung Sha Wan, next to Fortune Estate. Like Fortune Estate, Hang Chun Court was formerly the site of Fortune Temporary Housing Area. It has two blocks built in 2001.

=== Houses ===
Name	Type	Completion
Chun Lai House	NCB (Ver.2000)	2001
Chun Yin House	NCB (Ver.2000)	2001

Both houses were under lockdown for mandatory covid test on 26 February 2022.

== Hoi Lai Estate ==
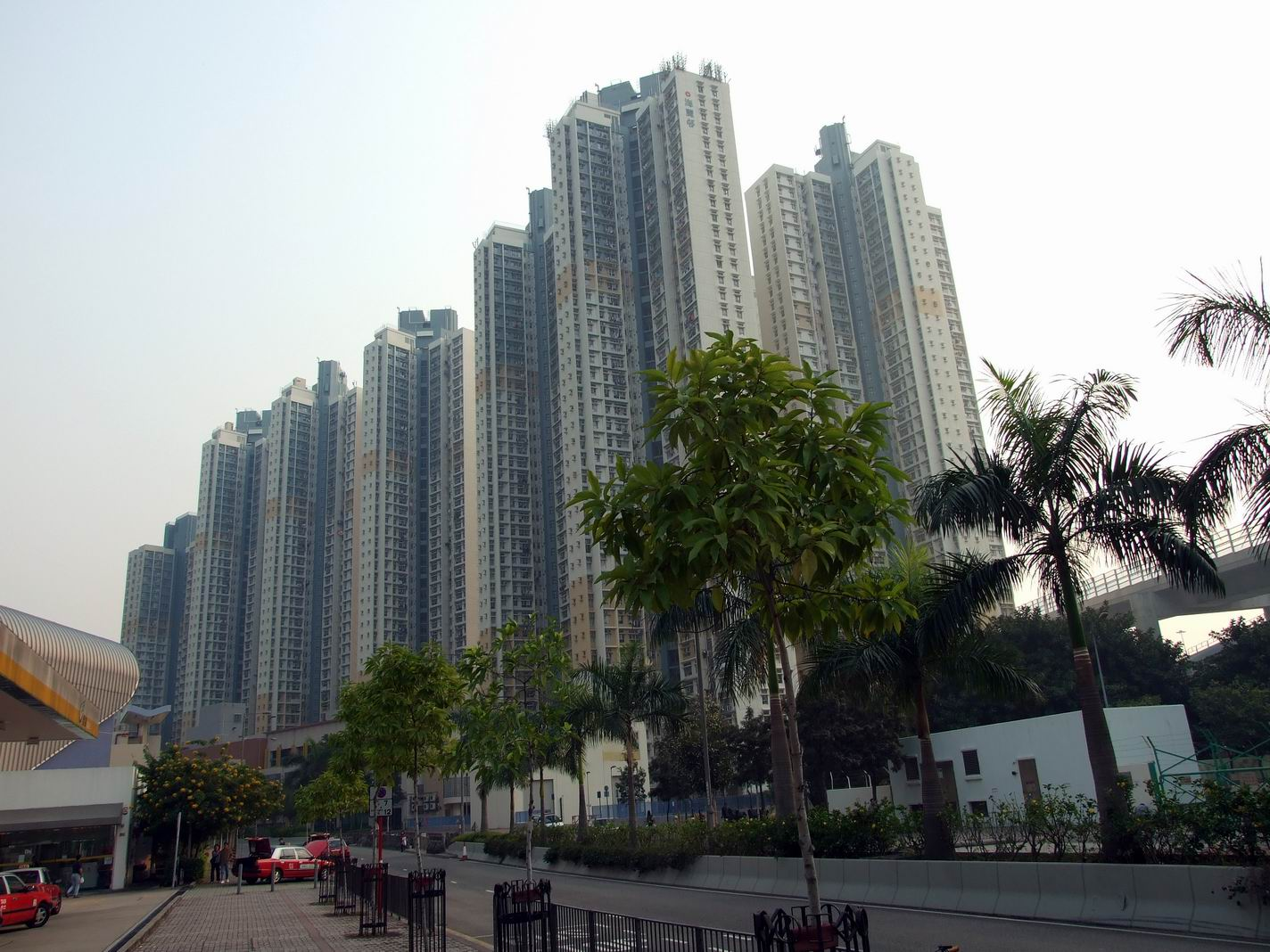
Hoi Lai Estate

Hoi Lai Estate (Chinese: 海麗邨) was built on the reclaimed land of south Cheung Sha Wan, near Lai Chi Kok station and four private housing estates, namely Aqua Marine, Banyan Garden, Liberté and The Pacifica. The estate consists of 12 residential buildings and a shopping centre completed between 2004 and 2005. It was planned for HOS court, but it was changed to rental housing before it was occupied.

=== Houses ===
Name	Type	Completion
Hoi Ming House	New Cruciform	2004
Hoi Ching House	New Cruciform	2004
Hoi Fai House	New Cruciform	2004
Hoi Yin House	New Cruciform	2004
Hoi Shun House	New Cruciform	2004
Hoi Nga House	New Cruciform	2004
Hoi Hei House	New Cruciform	2004
Hoi Kin House	New Cruciform	2004
Hoi Wo House	New Cruciform	2004
Hoi Chi House	New Cruciform	2004
Hoi Wai House	New Cruciform	2004
Hoi Shui House	Non Standard	2005

== Hoi Lok Court ==
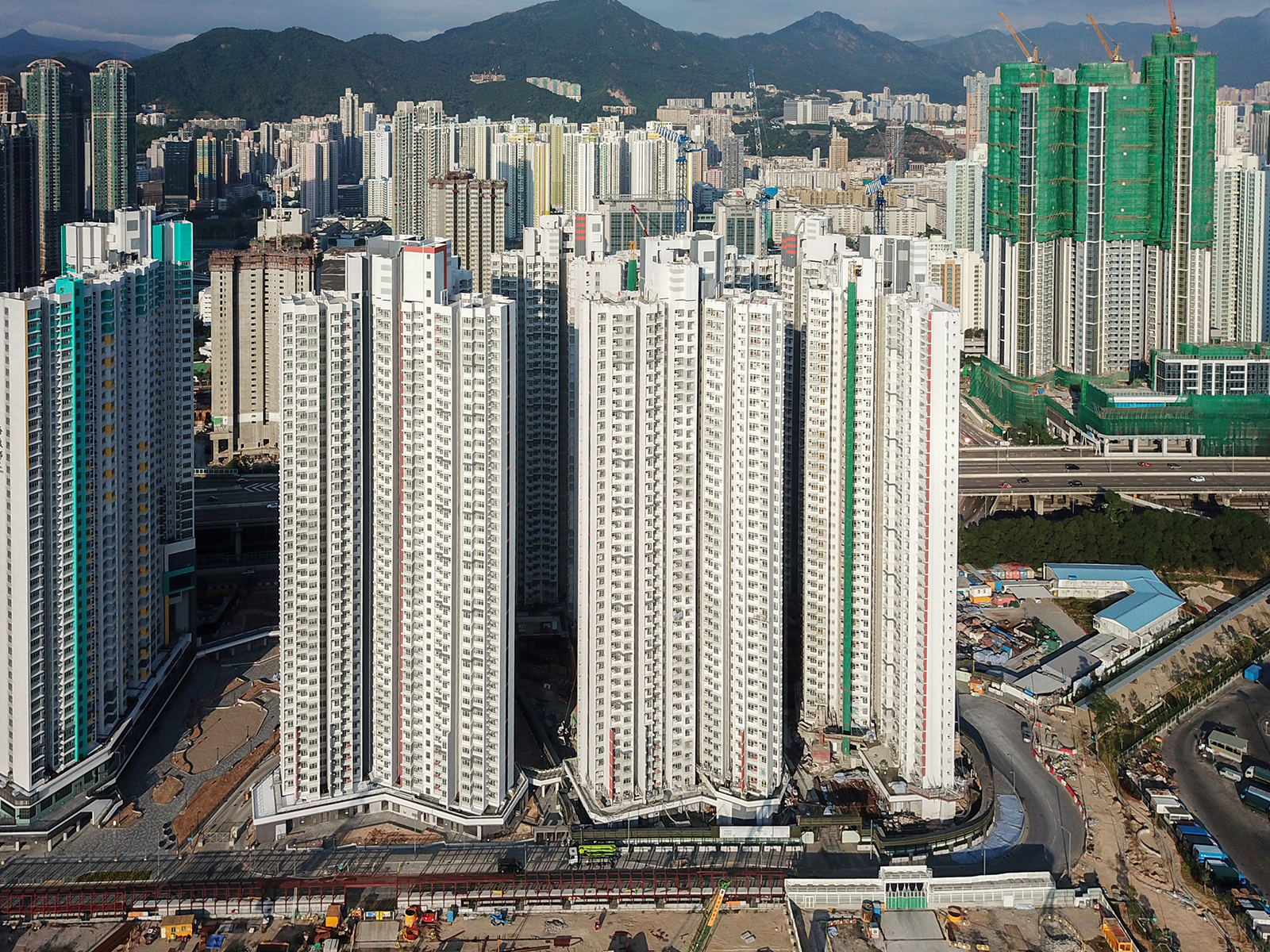
Hoi Lok Court

Hoi Lok Court (Chinese: 凱樂苑) is a Home Ownership Scheme court in Lai Ying Street, Cheung Sha Wan reclaimed area of Sham Shui Po District near MTR Nam Cheong station and Hoi Ying Estate. It comprises five 40-to-42-storey blocks with totally 2,522 flats. The flats were sold in 2018 at prices from HK$2.17M to HK$4.68M, after the revision from the previous 70% of the market flat prices to 52% announced by Carrie Lam, Chief Executive of Hong Kong. The court completed in 2019.

Name	Type	Completion	Phase
Hoi Pik House (Block A)	Non-standard	2019	I
Hoi Sha House (Block B)	Non-standard	2019	II
Hoi Ting House (Block C)	Non-standard	2019	II
Hoi Yuk House (Block D)	Non-standard	2019	II
Hoi Tung House (Block E)	Non-standard	2019	II

== Hoi Tak Court ==
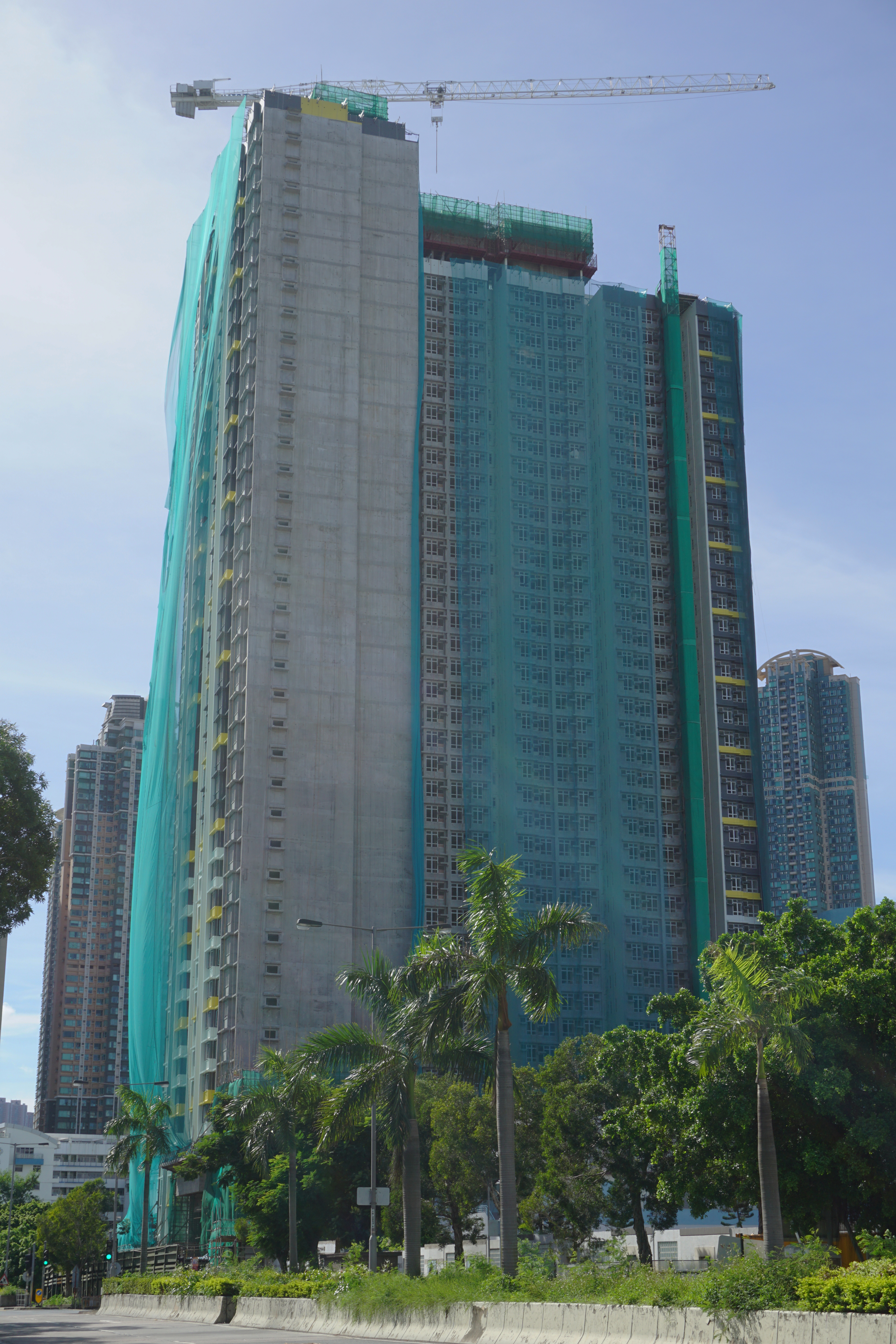
Hoi Tak Court

Hoi Tak Court (Chinese: 凱德苑) is a Home Ownership Scheme court in Fat Tseung Street West, Cheung Sha Wan reclaimed area of Sham Shui Po District, near MTR Nam Cheong station and Fu Cheong Estate. It comprises one block with totally 814 flats. It was arranged for sale in 2018 and is expected to complete in late 2020.

Name	Type	Completion
Hoi Tak Court	Non-standard	2020

== Lei Cheng Uk Estate ==
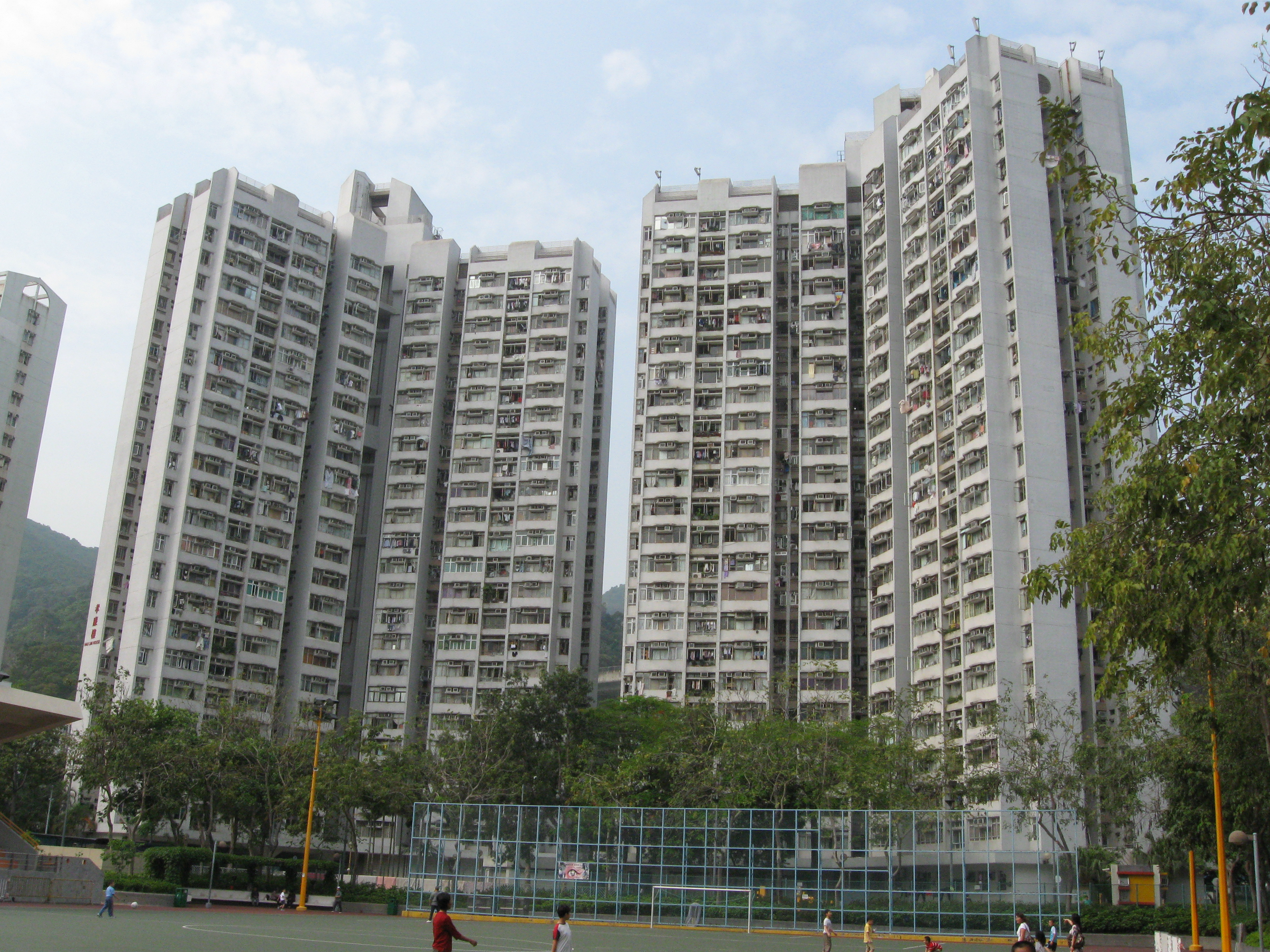
Hau Lim House and Hau Chi House, Lei Cheng Uk Estate.

Lei Cheng Uk Estate (Chinese: 李鄭屋邨) is a mixed public and TPS estate in Lei Cheng Uk, downhill of Cheung Sha Wan near So Uk Estate. It is also adjacent to the Lei Cheng Uk Han Tomb Museum. Since the redevelopment in the 1980s, the estate consists of 10 residential buildings completed in 1984, 1989 and 1990 respectively. In 2002, some of the flats were sold to tenants through Tenants Purchase Scheme Phase 5. The estate is now managed by Hong Kong Housing Society.

== Po Hei Court ==
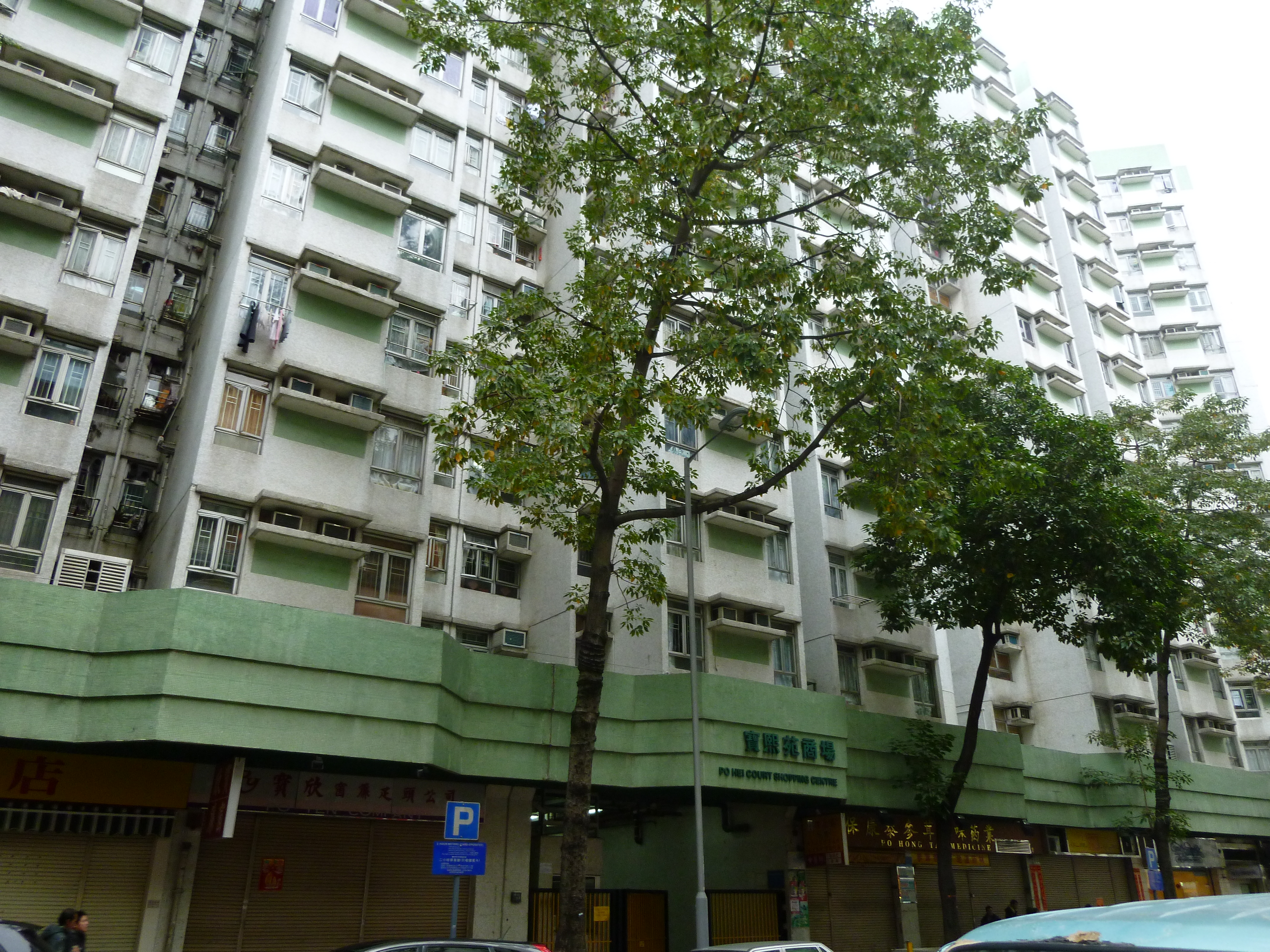
Po Hei Court

Po Hei Court (Chinese: 寶熙苑) is a HOS court in Cheung Sha Wan, next to Lei Cheng Uk Han Tomb Museum and Lei Cheng Uk Estate. It consists of 2 blocks built in 1993.

=== Houses ===
Name	Type	Completion
Fu Hei House	Non-Standard	1993
Wing Hei House	Non-Standard	1993

== Po Lai Court ==
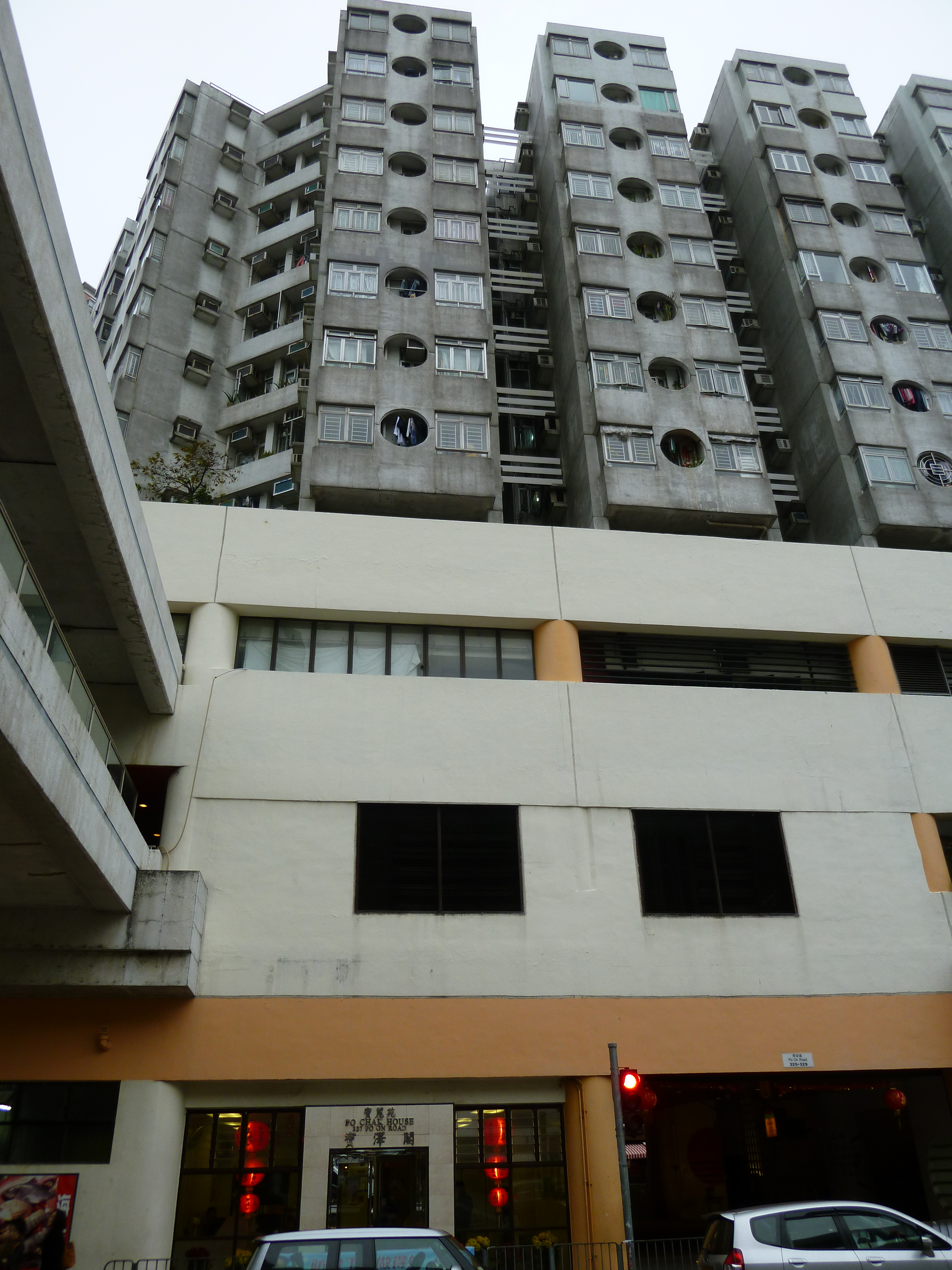
Po Lai Court

Po Lai Court (Chinese: 寶麗苑) is a HOS court in Cheung Sha Wan, next to Po Hei Court. It consists of three blocks built in 1987.

=== Houses ===
Name	Type	Completion
Po Fook House	Non-Standard	1987
Po Chak House	Non-Standard	1987
Po Hong House	Non-Standard	1987

== So Uk Estate ==
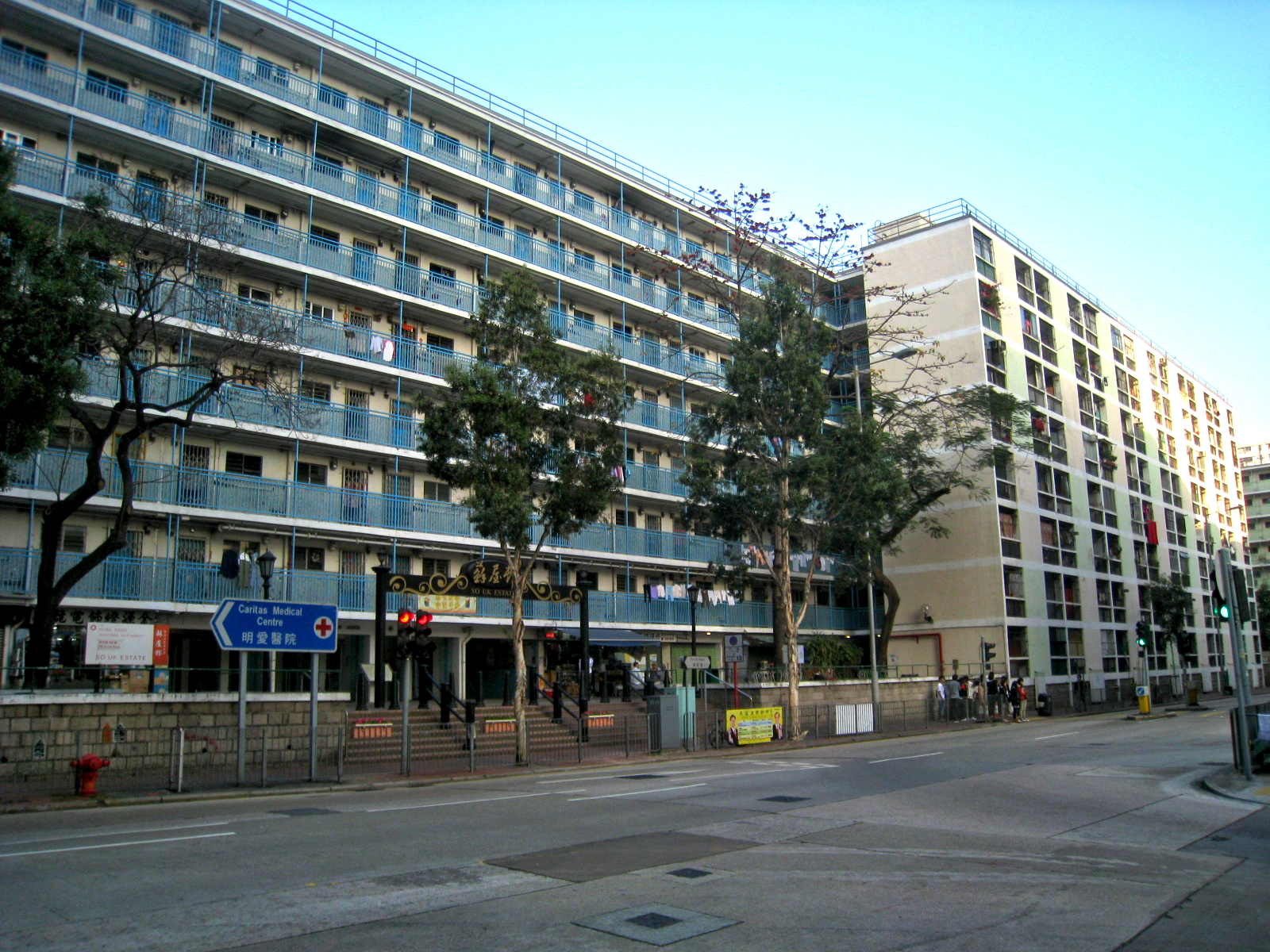
So Uk Estate

So Uk Estate (Chinese: 蘇屋邨) is situated in the northern area So Uk, a downhill in Cheung Sha Wan. The estate was built alongside of squatter areas, which was later demolished for the construction of the estate of 16 blocks in 1960. Unlike many public housing estates built afterwards, the architectural design of the estates is unique in Hong Kong. The "houses" were named after varieties of flowers. There are 5,316 flats in the estate, with capacity of 15,200. High maintenance cost made the Hong Kong Housing Authority decide to demolish it in 2008 and 2011 in two phases, and residents will be relocated to Un Chau Estate Phases 2, 4, and 5 in Sham Shui Po.

== Un Chau Estate ==
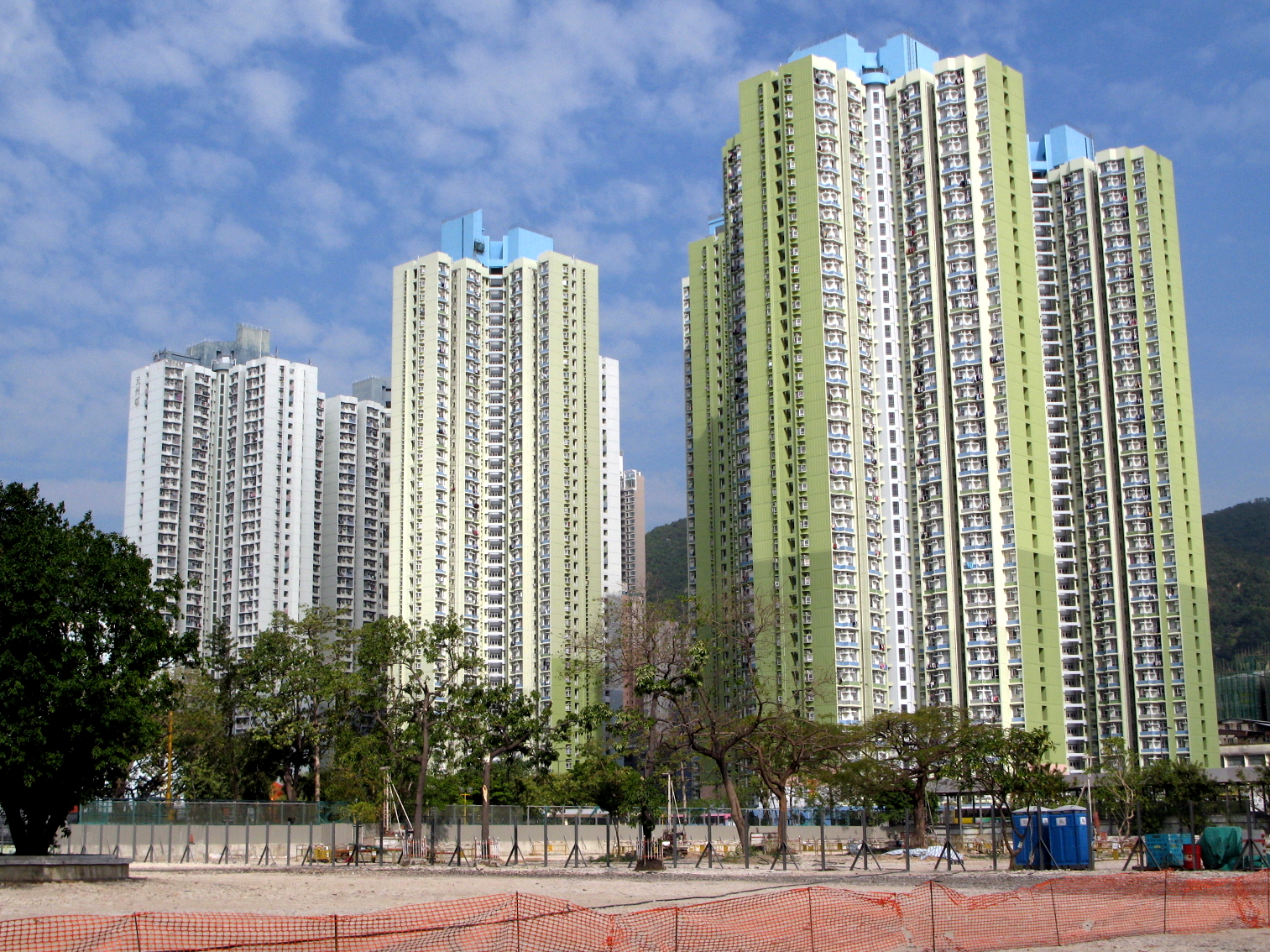
Un Chau Estate

Un Chau Estate (Chinese: 元州邨), or Un Chau Street Estate (Chinese: 元州街邨), is a redeveloped public estate on reclaimed land of Cheung Sha Wan located between Un Chau Street and Cheung Sha Wan Road, next to Cheung Sha Wan station. It consists of 10 residential buildings completed in 1998, 1999 and 2008, which were developed into 4 phases. Phase 5 is under development on the site of former Cheung Sha Wan Factory Estate.

== See also ==
- Public housing in Hong Kong
- List of public housing estates in Hong Kong
