= Fortune (constituency) =

- Former Elected constituency for the Sham Shui Po District Council
- Boundary of Fortune in Sham Shui Po District
- District: Sham Shui Po
- Legislative Council constituency: Kowloon West
- Population: 18,472 (2019)
- Electorate: 7,097 (2019)

Former constituency
- Created: 1994
- Abolished: 2023
- Number of members: One
- Member: Vacant
- Created from: Lai Chi Kok & Un Chau
- Replaced by: Sham Shui Po West

Fortune (Chinese: 幸福) was one of the 25 constituencies in the Sham Shui Po District of Hong Kong which was created in 1994.

The constituency loosely covers Fortune Estate in Cheung Sha Wan with the estimated population of 18,472.

== Councillors represented ==
Election	Member	Party
1994	Luk Ka-ming	ADPL
199?	Luk Ka-ming	Democratic
2003	Chum Tak-shing	ADPL
2015	Zoe Chow Wing-heng	ADPL
2018	Zoe Chow Wing-heng	Democratic
2019	Ronald Tsui Yat-sin→Vacant	ADPL

== Election results ==
=== 2010s ===
Sham Shui Po District Council Election, 2019: Fortune
Party	Candidate	Votes	%	±%
ADPL	Ronald Tsui Yat-sin	2,668	50.61	
DAB	Cheung Tak-wai	2,604	49.39	+2.39
Majority		64	1.22	
Turnout		5,290	74.56	
ADPL gain from Democratic		Swing		

Sham Shui Po District Council Election, 2015: Fortune
Party	Candidate	Votes	%	±%
ADPL	Zoe Chow Wing-heng	2,137	53.0	−13.7
DAB	Cheung Tak-wai	1,898	47.0	+13.7
Majority		239	6.0	
Turnout		4,035	54.5	
ADPL hold		Swing	−13.7	

Sham Shui Po District Council Election, 2011: Fortune
Party	Candidate	Votes	%	±%
ADPL	Chum Tak-shing	2,183	66.7	+8.5
DAB	Leung Ming-yin	1,092	33.3	−8.5
Majority		1,092	33.4	
Turnout		3,275	40.9	
ADPL hold		Swing	+8.5	

=== 2000s ===
Sham Shui Po District Council Election, 2007: Fortune
Party	Candidate	Votes	%	±%
ADPL	Chum Tak-shing	2,420	58.2	+1.2
DAB	Tam Chiu-yee	1,736	41.8	+36.2
Majority		684	16.4	
ADPL hold		Swing		

Sham Shui Po District Council Election, 2003: Fortune
Party	Candidate	Votes	%	±%
ADPL	Chum Tak-shing	2,677	57.0	+16.9
Democratic	Luk Ka-ming	1,311	27.9	−14.8
DAB	Tam Chiu-yee	705	15.0	−2.1
Majority		1,366	29.1	
ADPL gain from Democratic		Swing	+15.9	

=== 1990s ===
Sham Shui Po District Council Election, 1999: Fortune
Party	Candidate	Votes	%	±%
Democratic	Luk Ka-ming	1,285	42.7	−16.7
ADPL	Chum Tak-shing	1,208	40.1	
DAB	Ngai Ho-yin	516	17.1	
Majority		77	2.6	
Democratic hold		Swing		

Sham Shui Po District Board Election, 1994: Fortune
Party	Candidate	Votes	%	±%
ADPL	Luk Ka-ming	1,561	59.4	
DAB	Fong Yi-kei	1,067	40.6	
Majority		494	8.8	
ADPL win (new seat)				
