= Cheung Sha Wan Factory Estate =

Factory estate in Kowloon, Hong Kong

Coordinates: 22.335637°N 114.157249°E

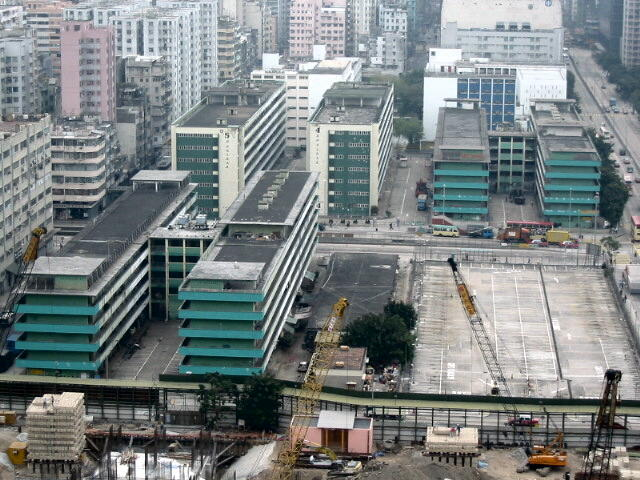
2003 view of Cheung Sha Wan Factory Estate

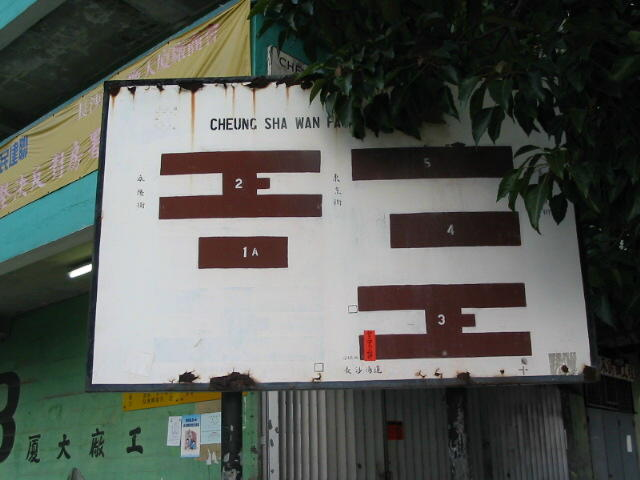
Map of Cheung Sha Wan Factory Estate

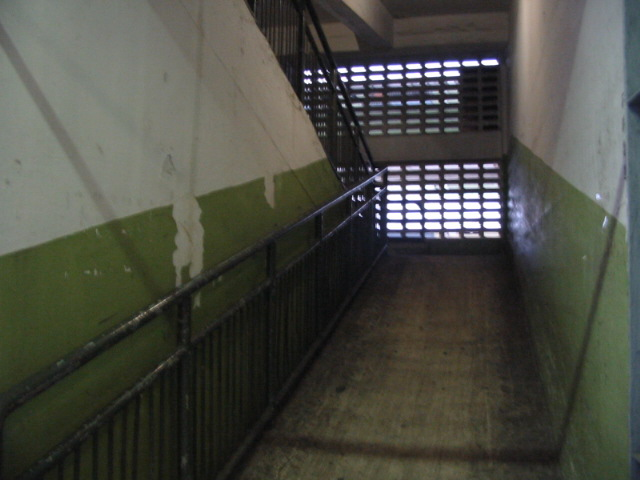
There was no lift service in the buildings for loading goods.

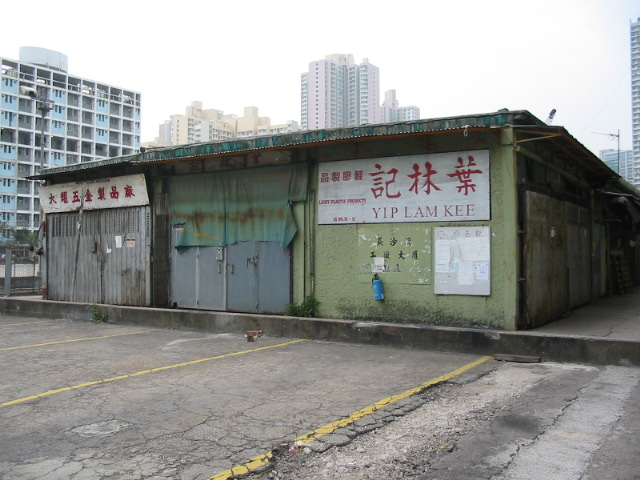
Block 1A, Cheung Sha Wan Factory Estate

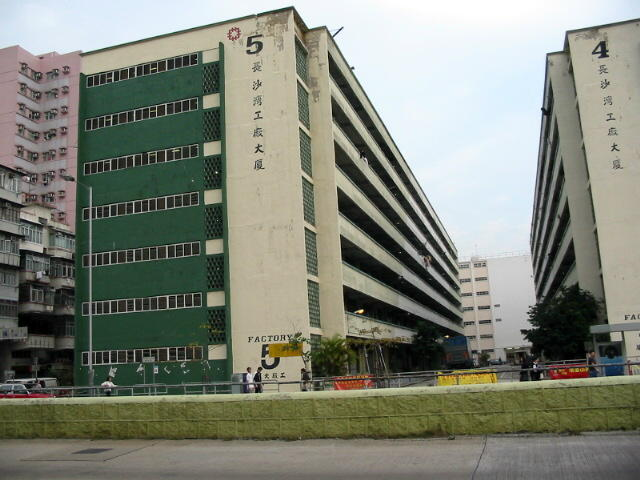
Block 5, Cheung Sha Wan Factory Estate

Cheung Sha Wan Factory Estate (Chinese: 長沙灣工廠大廈) was a factory estate in Cheung Sha Wan, Kowloon, Hong Kong, owned and managed by the Hong Kong Housing Authority. It comprised up to six low-storey blocks without lift service, built between 1957 and 1965.

Cheung Sha Wan Factory Estate was the first factory estate in Hong Kong built in Hong Kong by the Public Works Department. The six blocks of the estate were completed in October 1957 (Block 1), August 1960 (Block 1A), November 1960 (Block 2), September 1961 (Block 3), July 1965 (Block 4 and 5). Block 1 was demolished in 1990 due to structural problems.

Due to their outdated facilities, the five remaining blocks were cleared in 2002. The vacating of the estate was completed in April 2003, and it was demolished in 2006.

The part of the site west of Tonkin Street is now occupied by a public housing estate, Un Chau Estate Phase 5, completed in 2012. The part east of Tonkin Street is occupied by CCC Heep Woh Primary School (Cheung Sha Wan) and Sheng Kung Hui St. Thomas' Primary School.

== See also ==
- Public factory estates in Hong Kong
