= Un Chau Estate =

Housing estate in Cheung Sha Wan, Hong Kong

Coordinates: 22.336917°N 114.156219°E

- Chinese: 元州邨
Transcriptions
Standard Mandarin
- Hanyu Pinyin: Yuán Zhōu Cūn
Yue: Cantonese
- Jyutping: jyun4 zau1 cyun1

Un Chau Street Estate
- Chinese: 元州街邨
Transcriptions
Standard Mandarin
- Hanyu Pinyin: Yuán Zhōu Jiē Cūn
Yue: Cantonese
- Jyutping: jyun4 zau1 gaai1 cyun1

Un Chau Street Government Low Cost Housing Estate
- Chinese: 元洲街政府廉租屋邨
Transcriptions
Standard Mandarin
- Hanyu Pinyin: Yuán Zhōu Jiē Zhèngfǔ Lián Zū Wūcūn
Yue: Cantonese
- Jyutping: jyun4 zau1 gaai1 zing3 fu2 lim4 zou1 uk1 cyun1

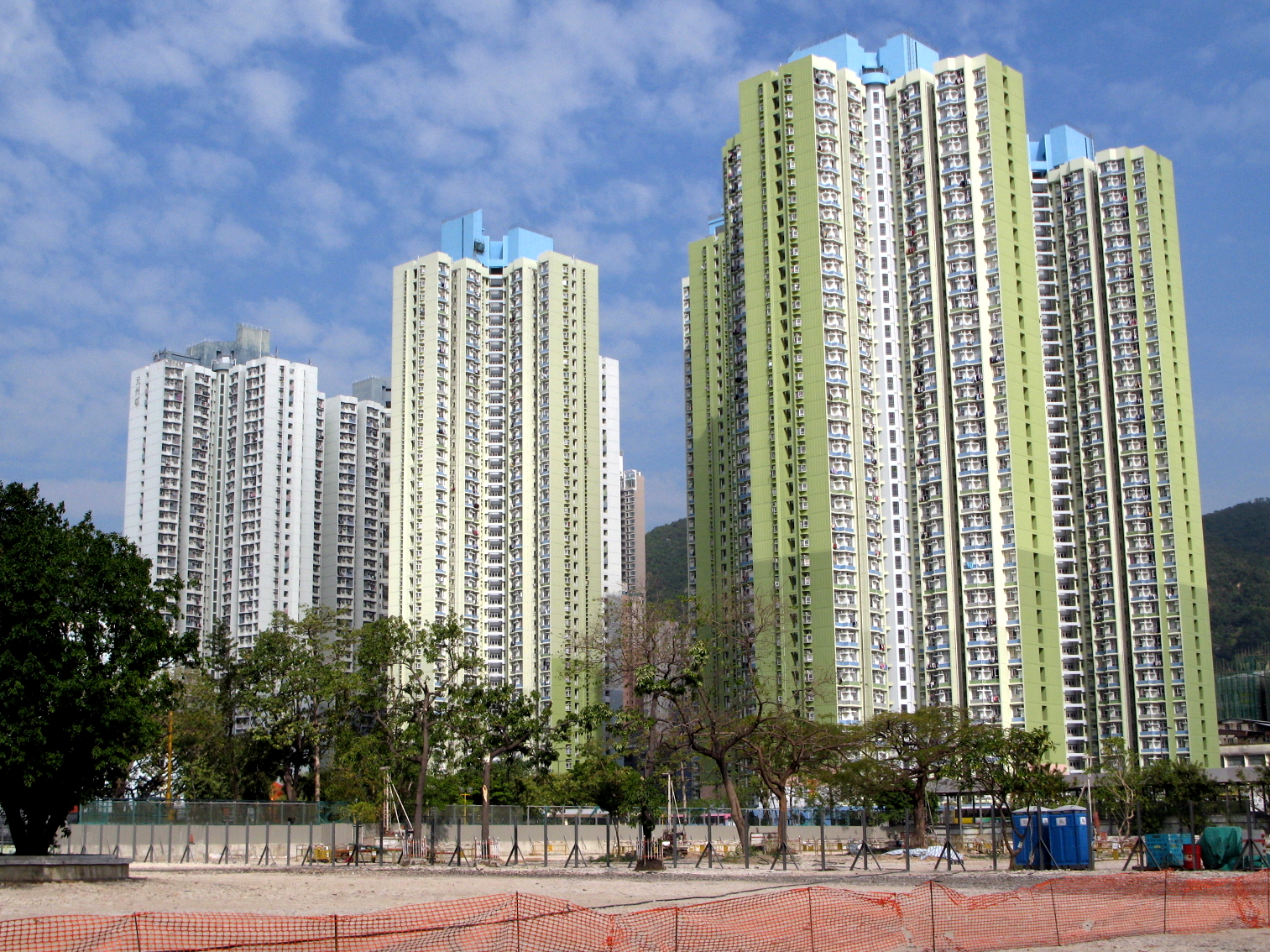
Un Chau Estate

Un Chau Estate (Chinese: 元州邨), or Un Chau Street Estate (Chinese: 元州街邨) before redevelopment, is a public housing estate on the reclaimed land of Cheung Sha Wan, Kowloon, Hong Kong, located between Un Chau Street and Cheung Sha Wan Road, next to MTR Cheung Sha Wan station. It consists of 10 residential buildings completed in 1998, 1999 and 2008, which were developed into 4 phases. Phase 5 was developed on the site of the former Cheung Sha Wan Factory Estate.

== Background ==
Un Chau Street Estate had 8 residential blocks completed in 1969, but all the blocks were demolished in 1990s and 2000s, and replaced by new buildings. The redeveloped estate was renamed as "Un Chau Estate". Phase 1 and 3 consists of 6 residential buildings (a building for senior citizens included) and a shopping centre, which were completed between 1998 and 1999. Phase 2 and 4 consists of 5 residential buildings completed in 2008.

Phase 5 is on the site of the former Cheung Sha Wan Factory Estate. It comprises three site-oriented domestic blocks and an ancillary facilities block providing car parks, amenity facilities, elderly centre and the integrated family services centre. Foundation works commenced in 2007 and were completed in 2012.

== Demographics ==
According to the 2016 population by-census, Un Chau Estate has a population of 18,482. 97% of the population is of Chinese ancestry. Median monthly domestic household income is HK$ 14,930.

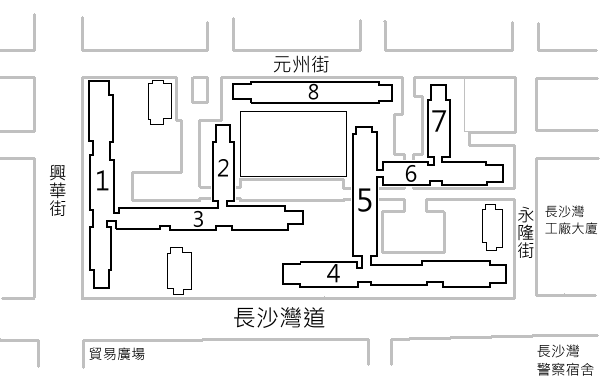
Map of former Un Chau Street Estate

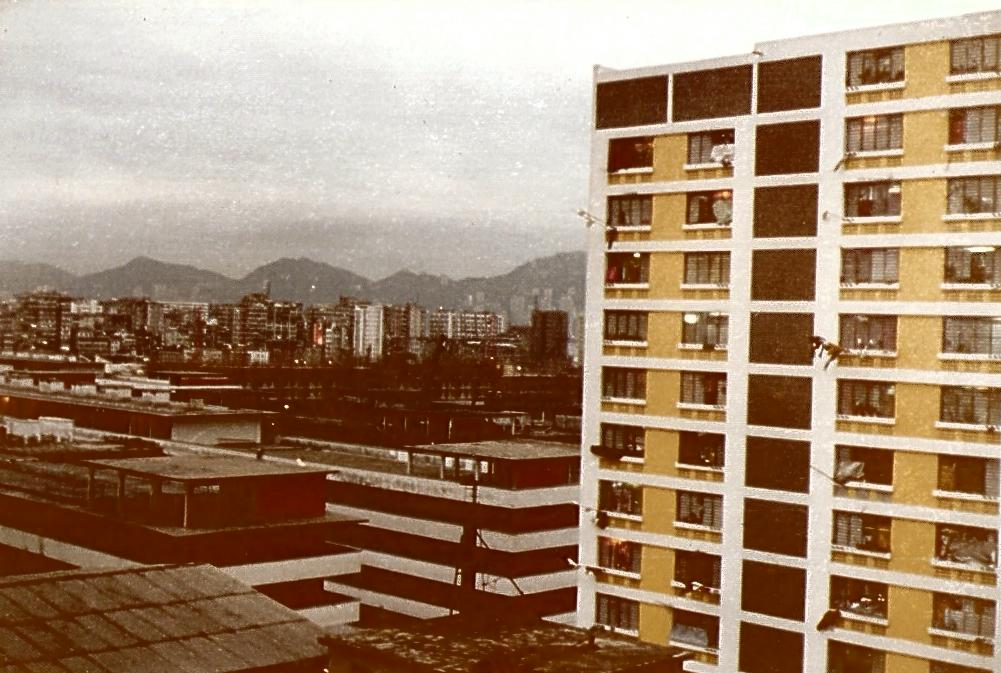
Blocks of former Un Chau Street Estate in 1980s

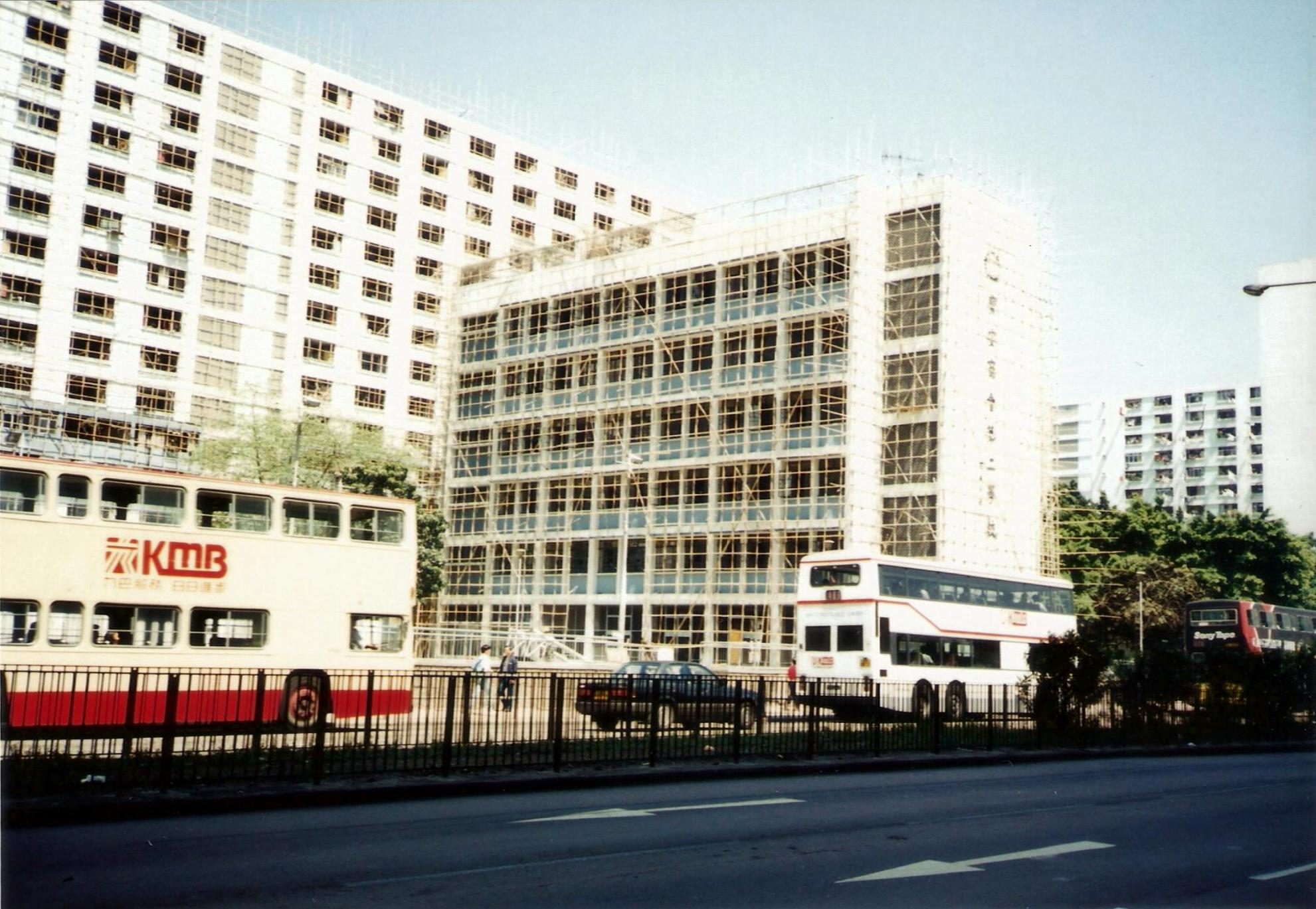
Blocks of former Un Chau Street Estate in 1990s

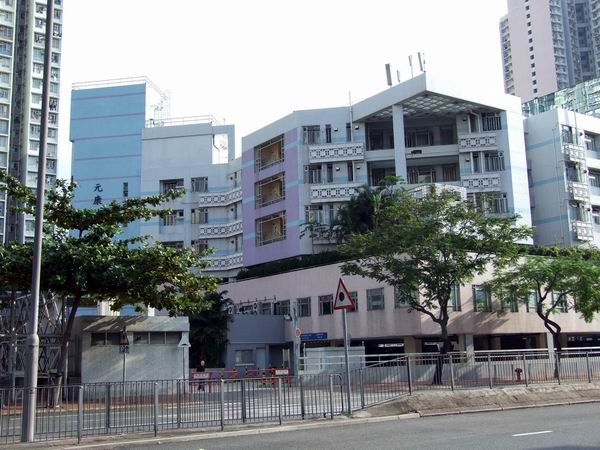
Phase 1 Un Hong House, Un Chau Estate

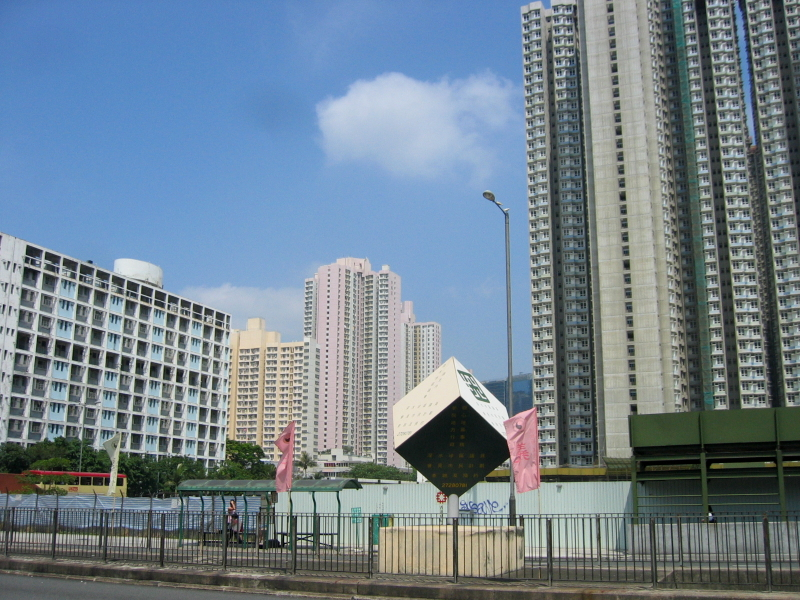
Phase 2, Un Chau Estate

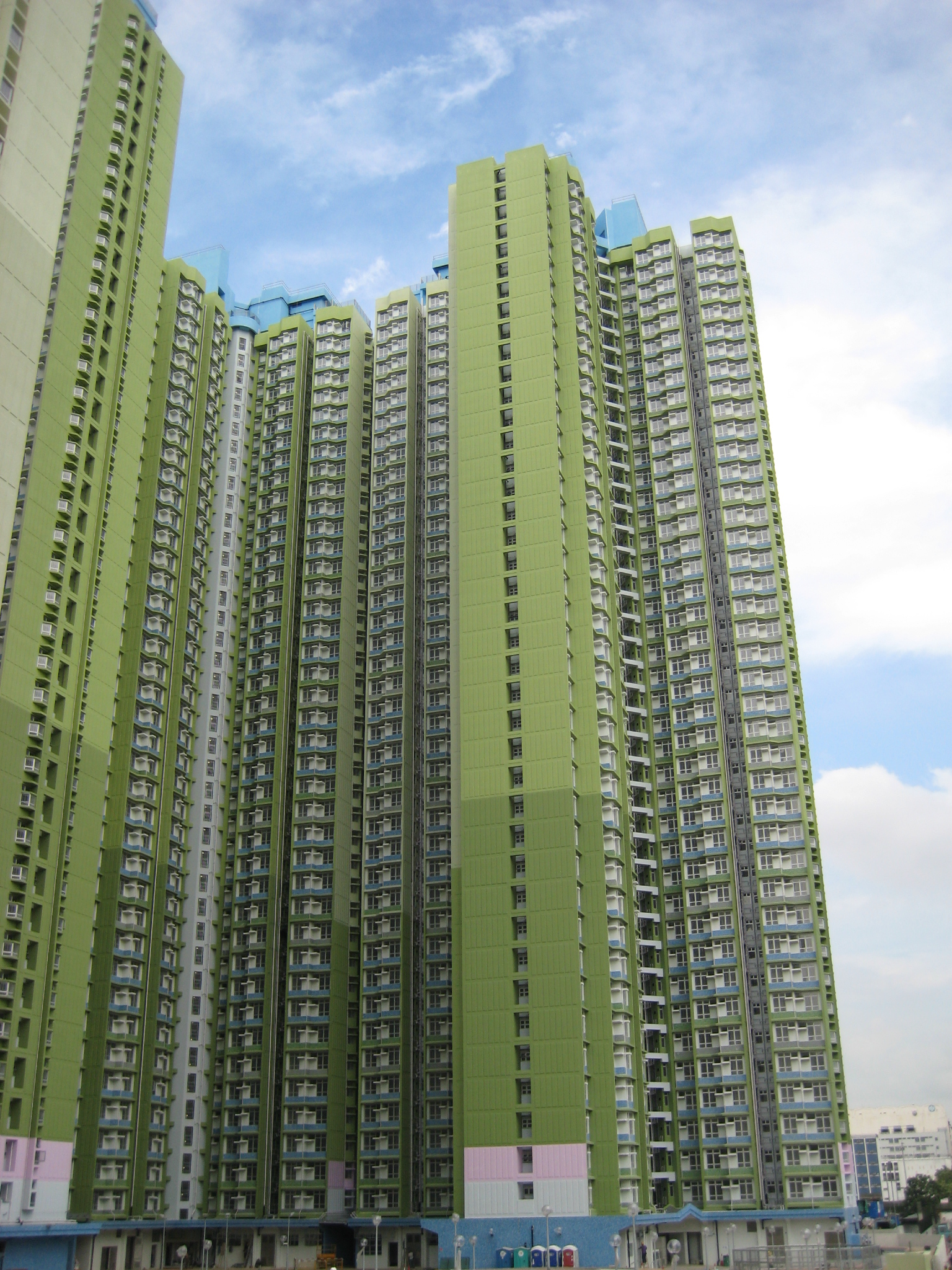
Phase 2 and 4, Un Chau Estate

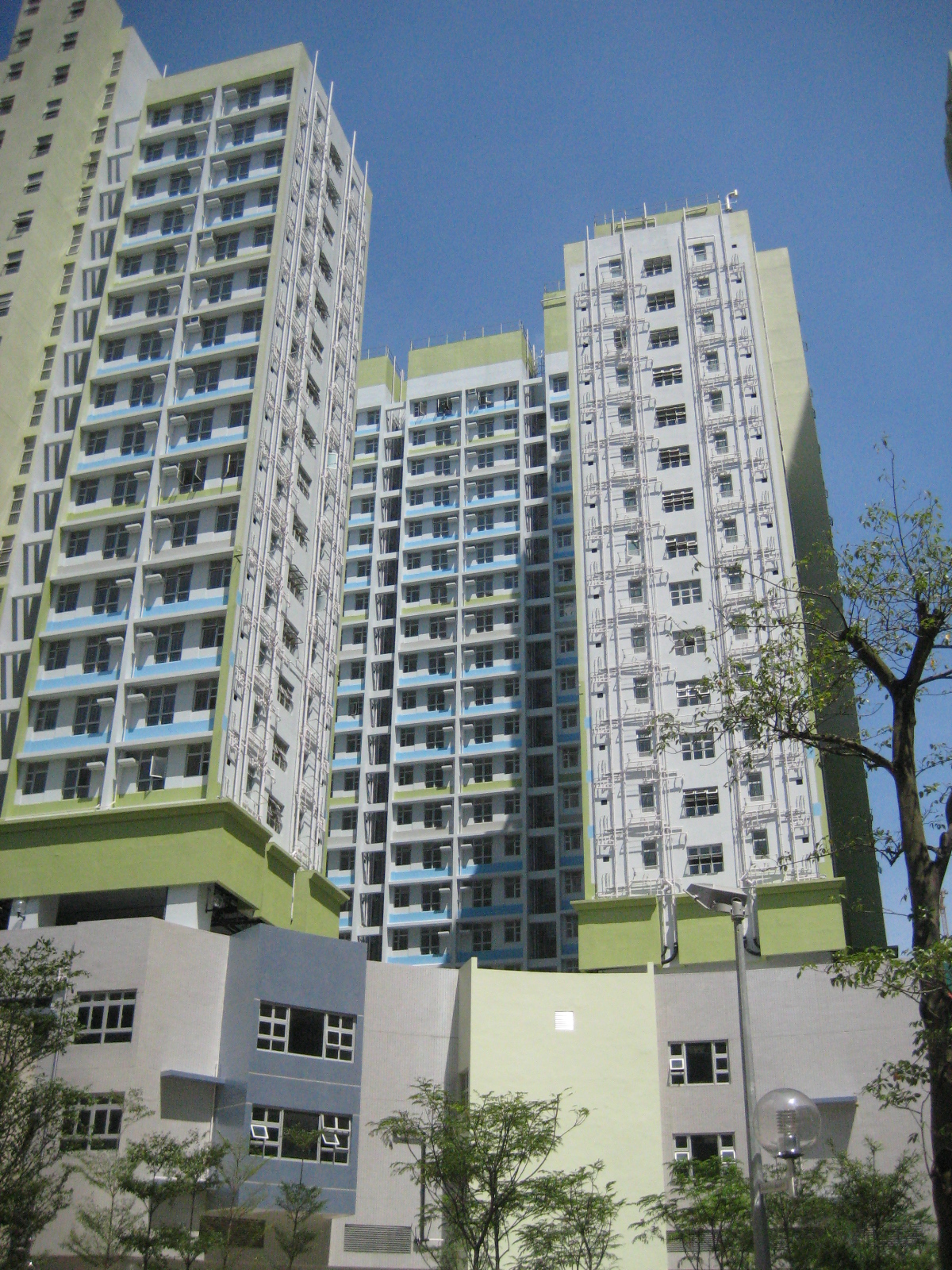
Phase 4 Un Kin House, Un Chau Estate

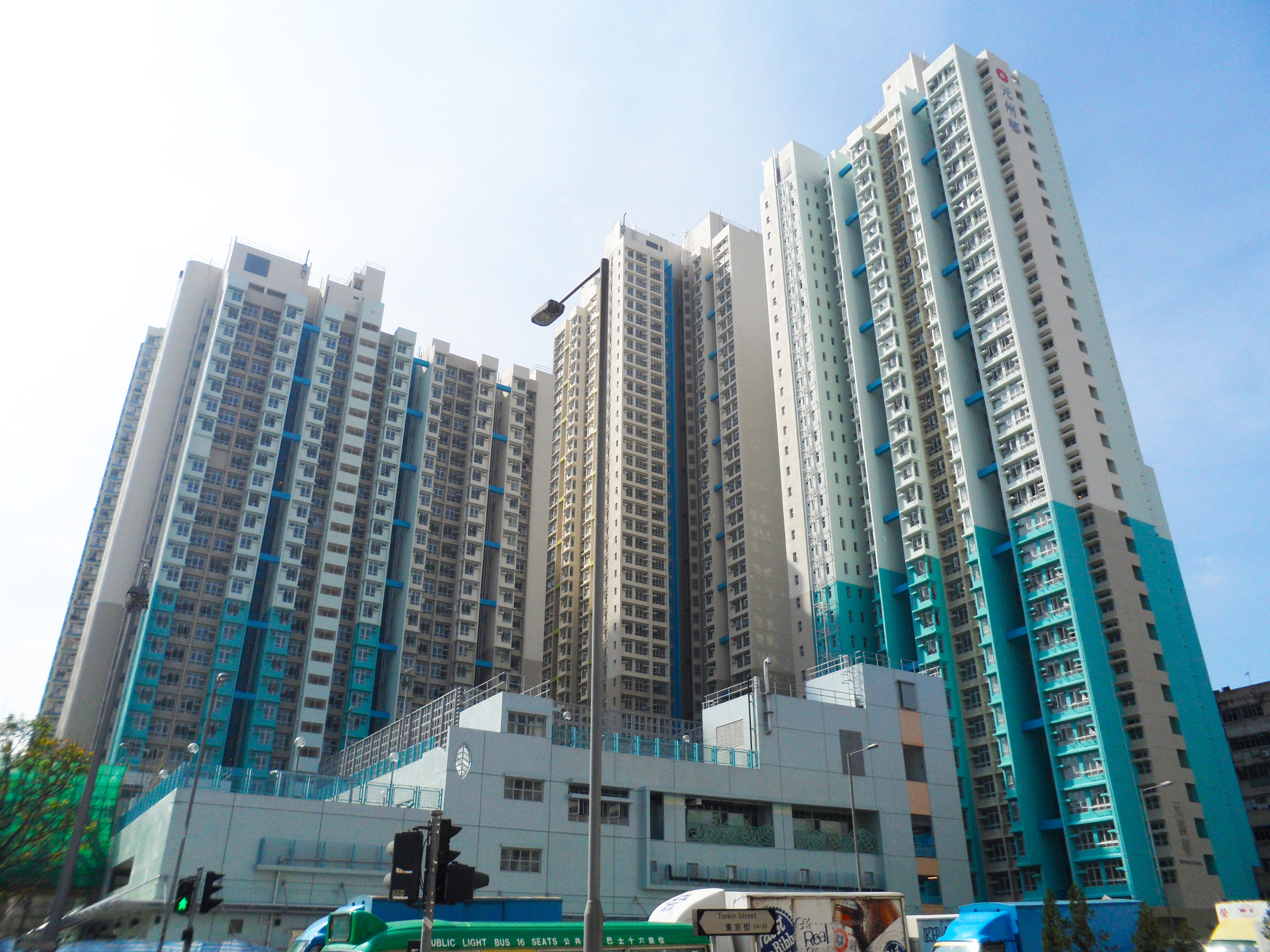
Phase 5 in 2012

== Houses ==
Name	Chinese name	Type	Completion
Un Hong House	元康樓	Senior Citizens	1998
Un Wo House	元和樓	Senior Citizens	1999
Un Fung House	元豐樓	Harmony 1	1999
Un Shing House	元盛樓	Harmony 1	1999
Un Tai House	元泰樓	Harmony 1	1999
Un Lok House	元樂樓	New Harmony 1	2008
Un Nga House	元雅樓	New Harmony 1	2008
Un Chi House	元智樓	New Harmony 1	2008
Un Hei House	元禧樓	New Harmony 1	2008
Un Kin House	元健樓	Small Household Block	2008
Un Mun House	元滿樓	Non-Standard Domestic Block	2012
Un Wai House	元慧樓	Non-Standard Domestic Block	2012
Un Yat House	元逸樓	Non-Standard Domestic Block	2012
Un Him House	元謙樓	Auxiliary facilities building	2012

Phase 2, 4 and 5 have been offered as alternate public housing for people displaced by the demolition of buildings in nearby So Uk Estate.

== See also ==
- Public housing in Hong Kong
- List of public housing estates in Hong Kong
