= Lei Cheng Uk =

Lei Cheng Uk (Chinese: 李鄭屋; Jyutping: lei5 zeng6 nguk1) was a group for villages of families of Lei/Lee/Li (李) and Cheng (鄭). The villages were demolished to build a public housing estate, Lei Cheng Uk Estate. At the beginning of the construction, a Han tomb was found there and named as "Lei Cheng Uk Han Tomb", which later became part of the Lei Cheng Uk Han Tomb Museum.

The name of a village, Sheung Lei Uk, is preserved in a park, Sheung Li Uk Garden (上李屋花園).

== See also ==
- Lei Cheng Uk Han Tomb Museum
- Lei Cheng Uk Estate
