= Tonkin Street =

Street in Hong Kong

Coordinates: 22.33743°N 114.15987°E

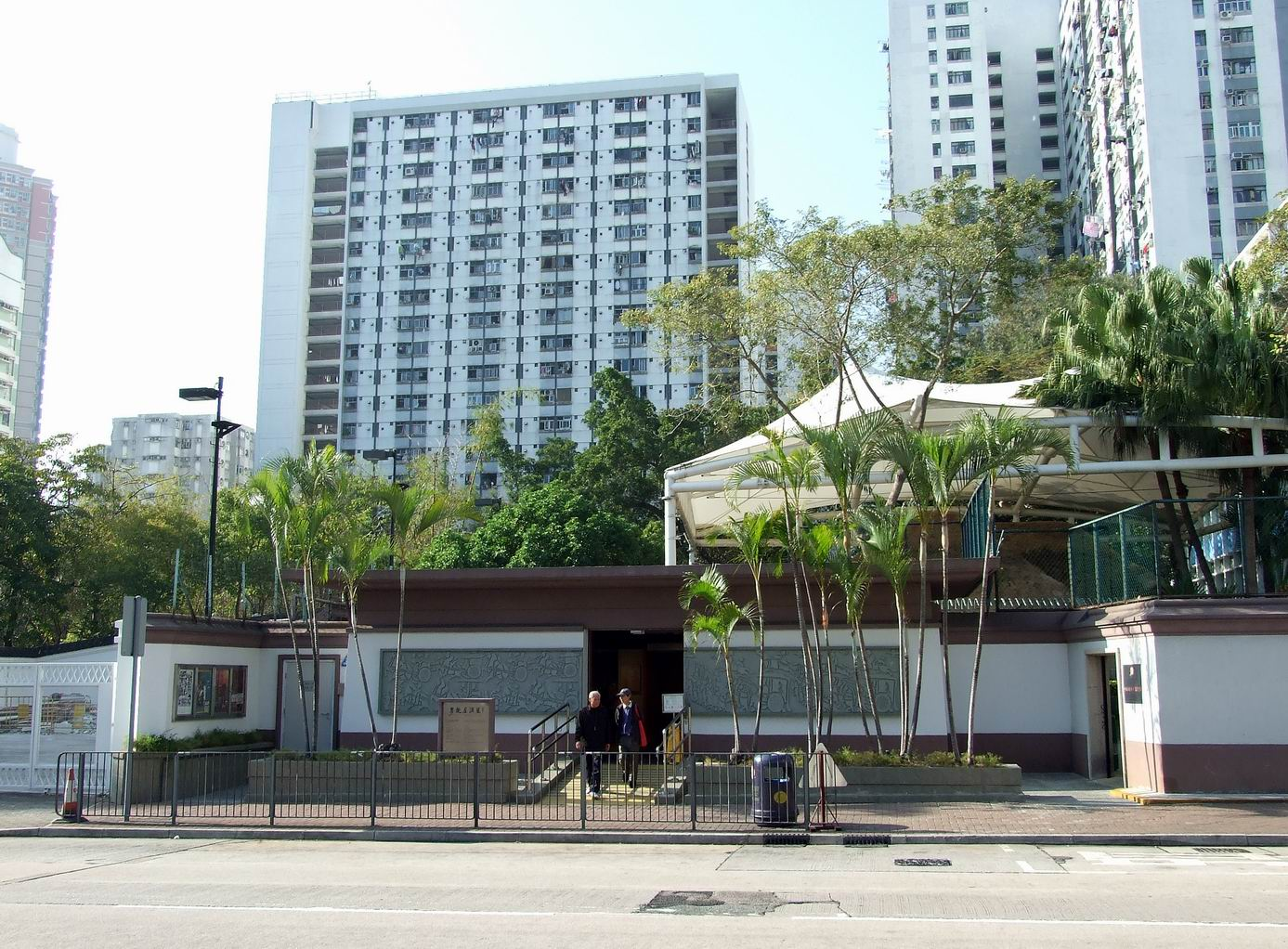
Entrance of the Lei Cheng Uk Han Tomb Museum in the northeastern part of Tonkin Street, with Lei Cheng Uk Estate in the background

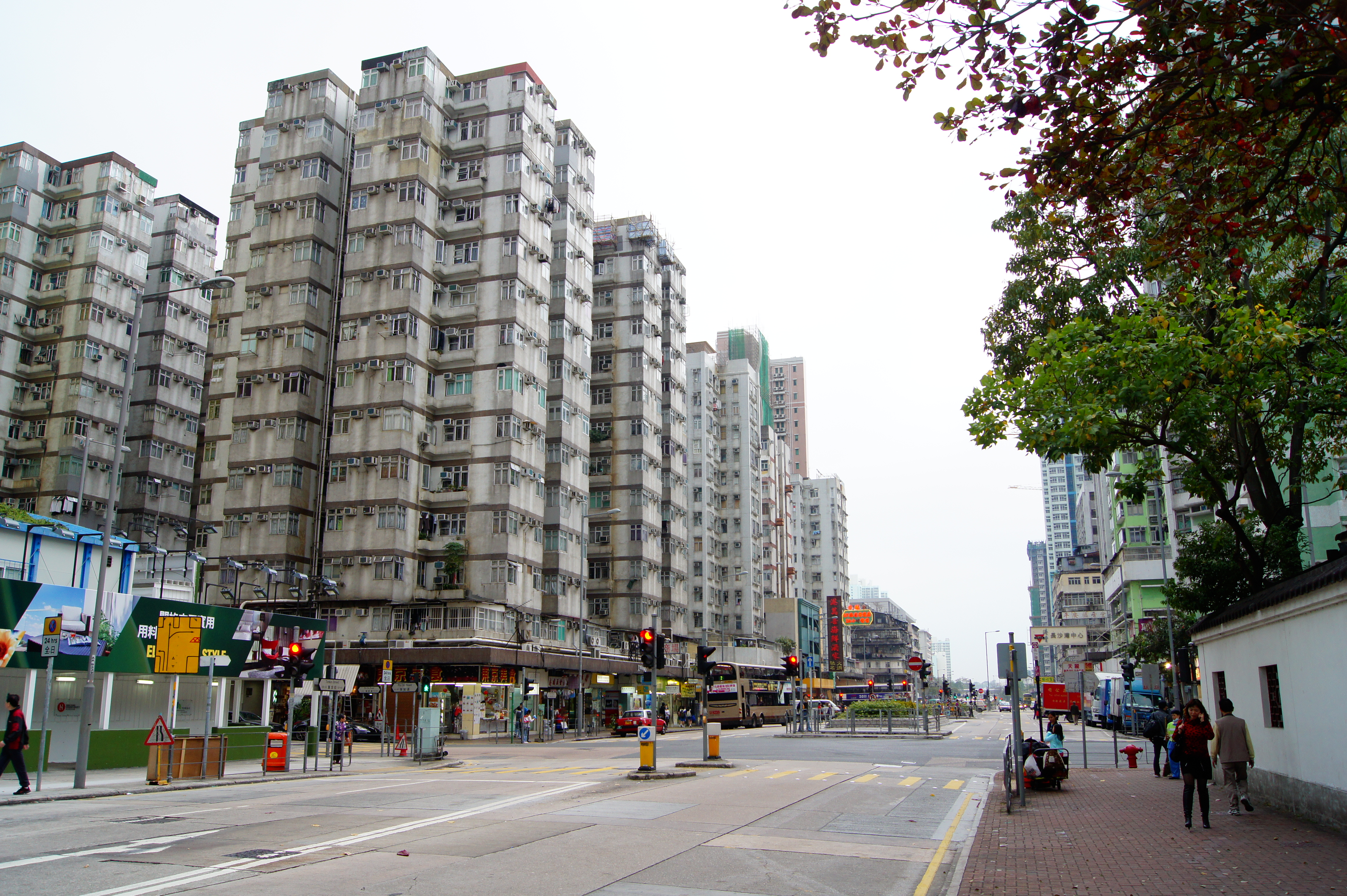
Tonkin Street, looking southwest from outside the Han Garden (漢花園), adjacent to the Lei Cheng Uk Han Tomb Museum

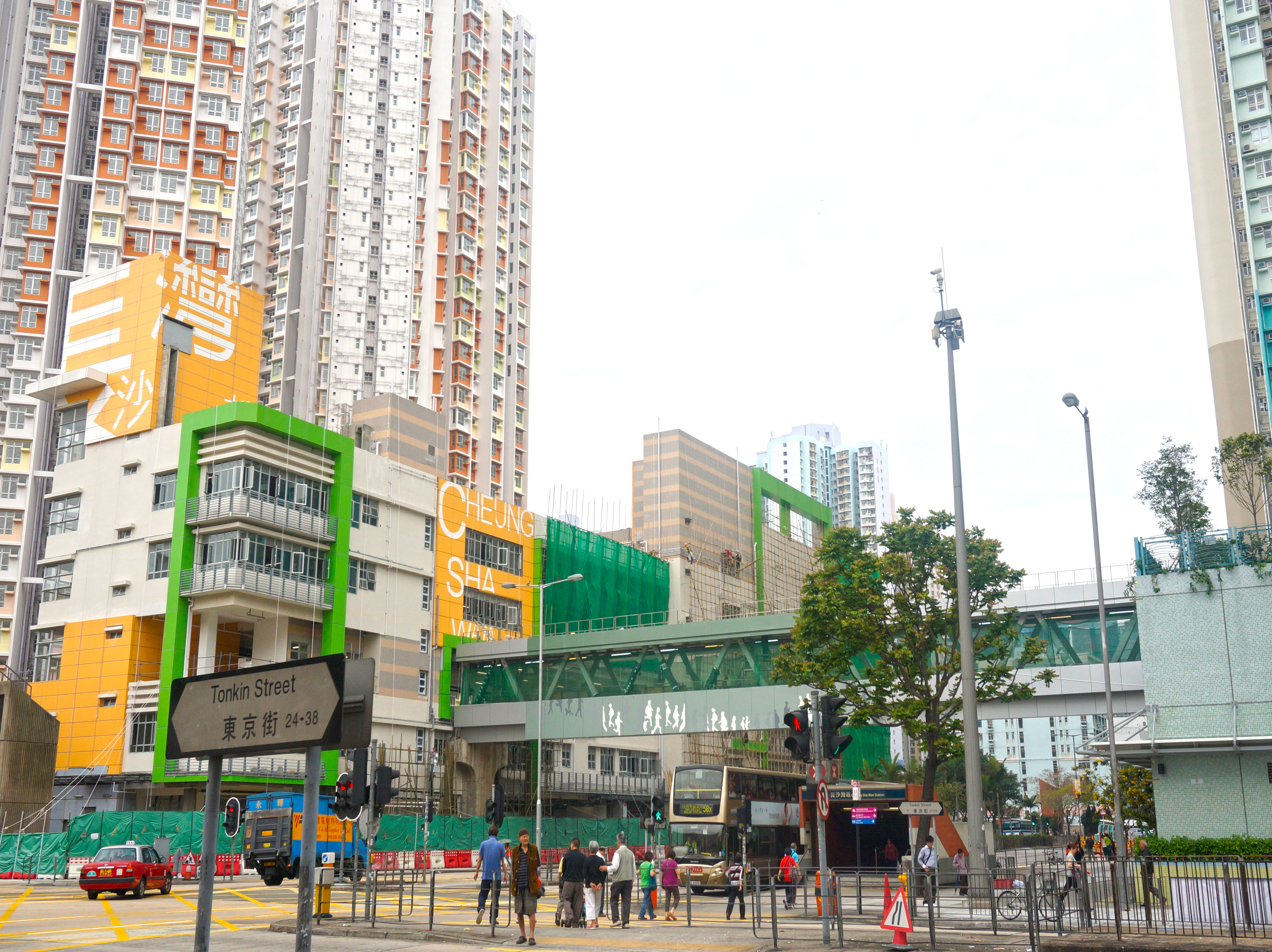
Intersection of Tonkin Street and Cheung Sha Wan Road, with Cheung Sha Wan Estate on the left

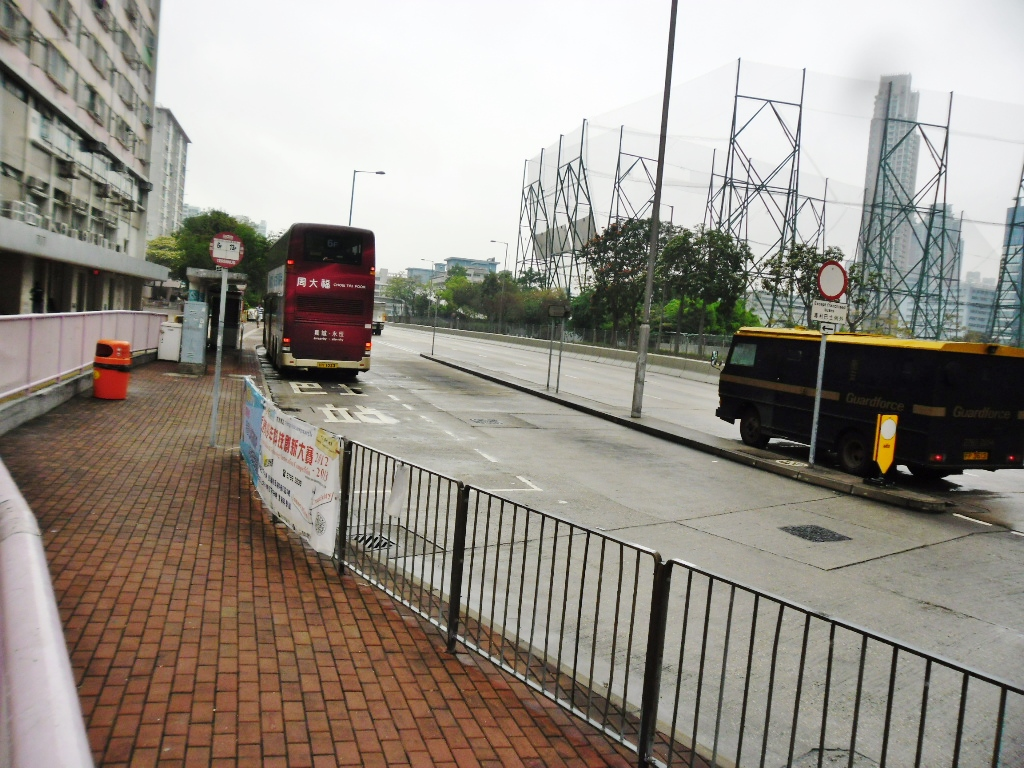
Southwestern part of Tonking Street, looking northeast, with Lai Kok Estate (left) and the Asia Golf Club (right)

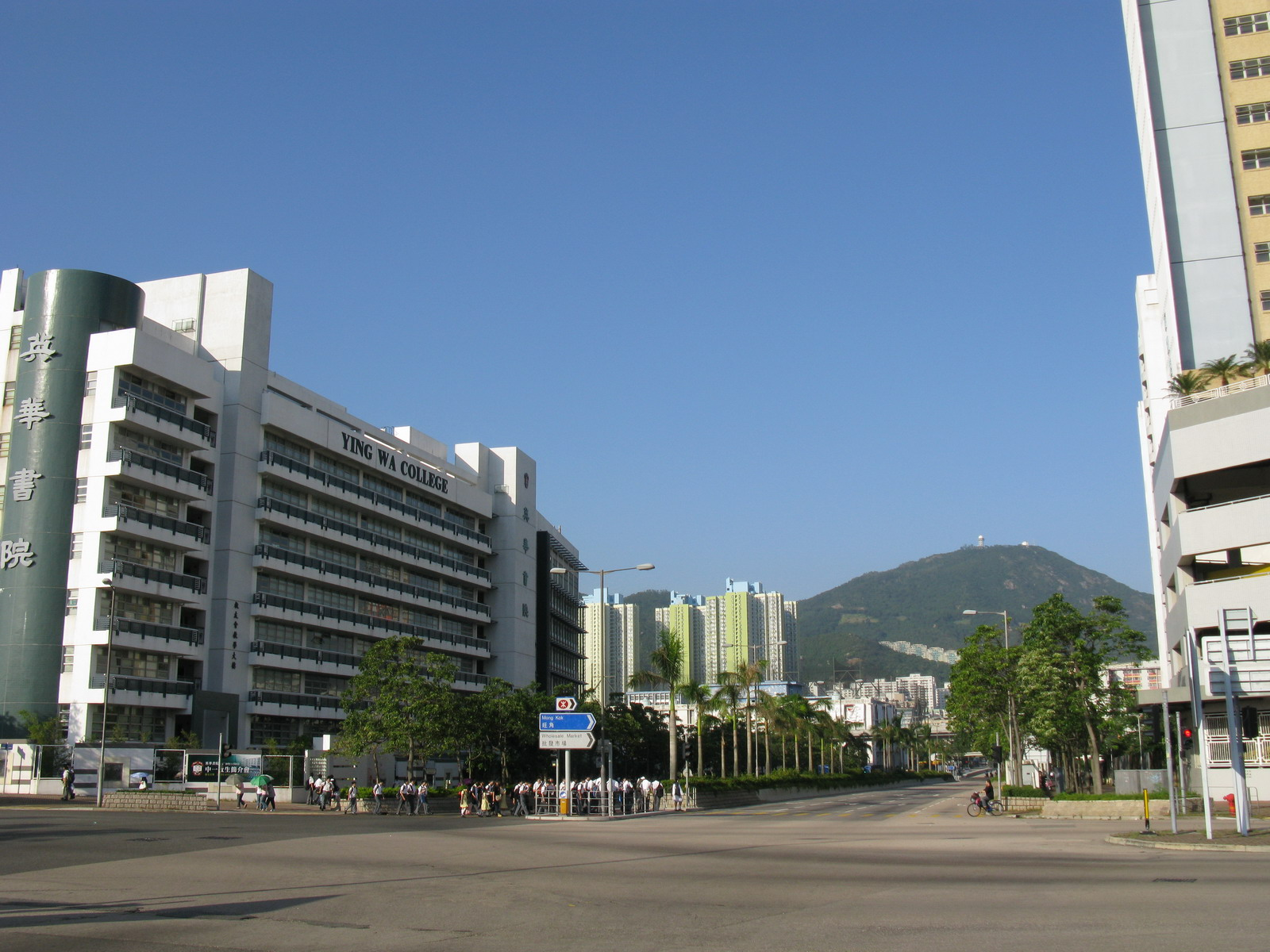
Ying Wa College along Tonkin Street West, looking northeast, with Beacon Hill in the distance

Tonkin Street (Chinese: 東京街) is a street between Sham Shui Po and Cheung Sha Wan of New Kowloon in Hong Kong. It runs northeast to southwest and crosses many major roads in the Cheung Sha Wan area. After extensive reclamation in West Kowloon during the 1990s, an extension Tonkin Street West (東京街西) was built.

== Name ==
Its Chinese name Tung King (東京) means eastern capital, which is a very common name in historical China and neighbour countries. Although the name in Chinese character is currently only used by Tokyo, eastern capital of Japan, a hint from its English name suggests that the name is associated with the eastern capital of Vietnam, Tonkin, namely modern-day Hanoi. British named roads and streets in the area by the trading cities in the surrounding of Hong Kong.

== Tonkin Street ==
Tonkin Street starts north from the junction with Kwong Lee Road near Lei Cheng Uk Estate and runs south across Po On Road, Shun Ning Road, Castle Peak Road, Un Chau Street, Fuk Wa Street, Cheung Sha Wan Road, Lai Chi Kok Road and ends at Tung Chau Street.

Part of the street maintains a nullah in the middle. Some notable landmarks can be found along the street. Lei Cheng Uk Estate is one of the early public housing estates in Hong Kong. Lei Cheng Uk Han Tomb Museum embedded a tomb dating back to Eastern Han Dynasty (AD 25–220). The former Cheung Sha Wan Factory Estate marked the prosperity of Hong Kong industry from 1950s to the early 1980s. The estate was suggested to be workshops for fashionists. Other abandoned buildings like Cheung Sha Wan Police Quarters and Cheung Sha Wan Abattoir are the colonial marks in Hong Kong. Amidst the city, an enclosed golf court can be found at the junction with Lai Chi Kok Road.

In 2016, a red-light camera was installed at Tonkin and Cheung Sha Wan Road.

=== Unearth of World War II explosive ===
On 8 April 2006, workers unearthed 588 pieces of explosive articles including cannon shells, bullets and grenades, in a drainage project in the street near Fuk Wing Street. The explosive was buried 1 to 3 metres beneath the surface. It belonged to former British Army around the period of World War II. Streets and MTR exits of surrounding area were closed to let the ammunition experts from Hong Kong Police Force to detonated these explosive. More pieces were unearthed at the same site on 27 April 2006.

== Tonkin Street West ==
Tonkin Street West (東京街西) continues Tonkin Street from Tung Chau Street to Lin Cheung Road near the interchange station of West Rail line Nam Cheong station and MTR Nam Cheong station, via Ying Wa Street and Sham Mong Road.

== See also ==
- List of streets and roads in Hong Kong
