= Frederick Seguier Drake =

Baptist missionary and sinologist (1892–1974)

- Born: 13 April 1892; Zouping, Shandong, Qing China
- Died: 21 August 1974 (aged 82)
- Other name: 林仰山 (Lín Yǎngshān)

Academic background
- Education: University of London

Academic work
- Discipline: Sinology
- Institutions: Cheeloo University; University of Hong Kong

Frederick Seguier Drake (Chinese: 林仰山; pinyin: Lín Yǎngshān, 13 April 1892 – 21 August 1974) was a Chinese-born English Baptist missionary, sinologist, and archaeologist. Born in 1892 to a family of British missionaries in Zouping, Shandong, he attended school in Britain before returning to Shandong with the Baptist Missionary Society (BMS) in 1914. After a decade of missionary service, he received a Teacher's Diploma and began work as an associate professor of education at Cheeloo University in Jinan. He briefly served as the principal of a high school in Qingzhou before returning to Cheeloo as a church history professor. He conducted archaeological work in the 1930s, discovering the Shang city of Daxinzhuang.

The operations of the Baptist church in Shandong were restricted following Japanese occupation in the Second Sino-Japanese War. Separated from his wife and child, Drake continued his work throughout the occupation and the succeeding Chinese Civil War. Large portions of Cheeloo University were destroyed during the capture of Jinan in September 1948, at which point Drake was the sole remaining BMS member in the city. He assisted in rebuilding following the war, although the BMS's duties were largely restricted to the operations of Cheeloo in the wake of an increasingly self-sufficient regional Baptist church and repression from the incipient Communist government. Drake left Cheeloo in 1951, obtaining a position as Professor of Chinese Studies at the University of Hong Kong the following year. His career at the university saw the recruitment of a number of prominent Chinese scholars, excavations of the Lei Cheng Uk Han Tomb, and the foundation of what would become the University Museum and Art Gallery. He retired in 1964, dying ten years later.

== Biography ==
On 13 April 1892, Frederick Seguier Drake was born to a family of British missionaries in Zouping, Shandong. He enrolled at the University of London, attending University College, Birkbeck, and the School of Oriental and African Studies. He obtained his B.A. in 1912, followed by a B.D. in 1914. That same year, he was appointed by the Baptist Missionary Society (BMS) as a missionary in northern China. Drake was among the first missionaries in Jinan to enjoy friendly relations with the Guiyidao, a locally prominent folk religious sect. In 1922, he led a group of theology students to a Guiyidao sanctuary, where they heard preaching incorporating universalist Christian and Daoist messages. Drake thought favorably of the experience and published a series of articles about the sect in the Chinese Recorder, one of a relatively small number of accurate second-hand accounts of the movement.

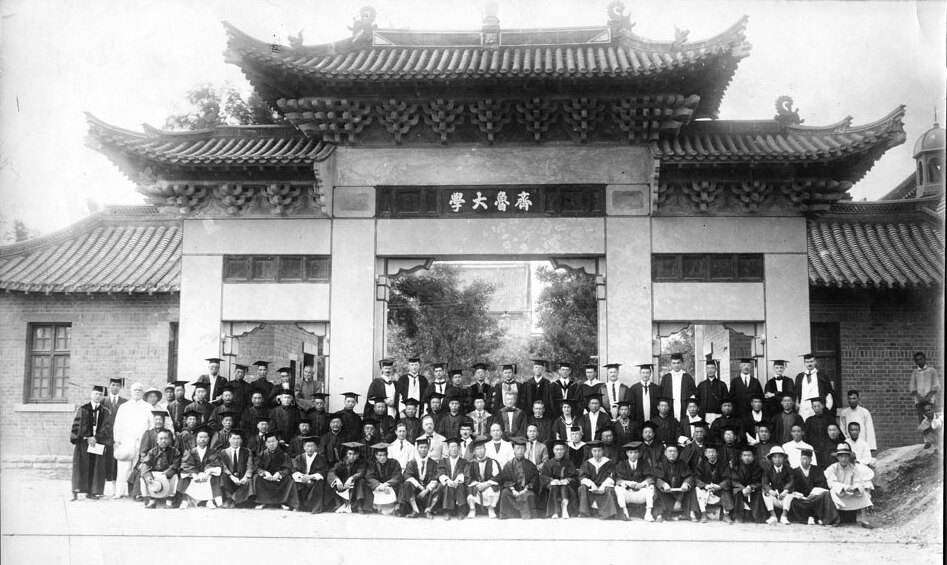
Faculty of Cheeloo University, 1924

Drake received a Teacher's Diploma in 1923, and was appointed as associate professor of education at Cheeloo University in Jinan the following year. Following a brief stint as principal of Gotch-Robinson High School (a BMS-founded academy in Qingzhou also known as Shoushan Middle School) in the late 1920s, Drake returned to Cheeloo as an associate professor of church history. In January 1930, he married Dora Mabel Cracknell. He declined an offered readership at the University of Hong Kong in 1934.

In 1935, during an archaeological survey along the Qingdao–Jinan railway, he discovered the Shang dynasty city of Daxinzhuang. He published numerous papers about his findings in 1939 and 1940. During this period he worked alongside Canadian missionary and sinologist James Mellon Menzies, a specialist in Shang pottery.

=== Japanese occupation ===
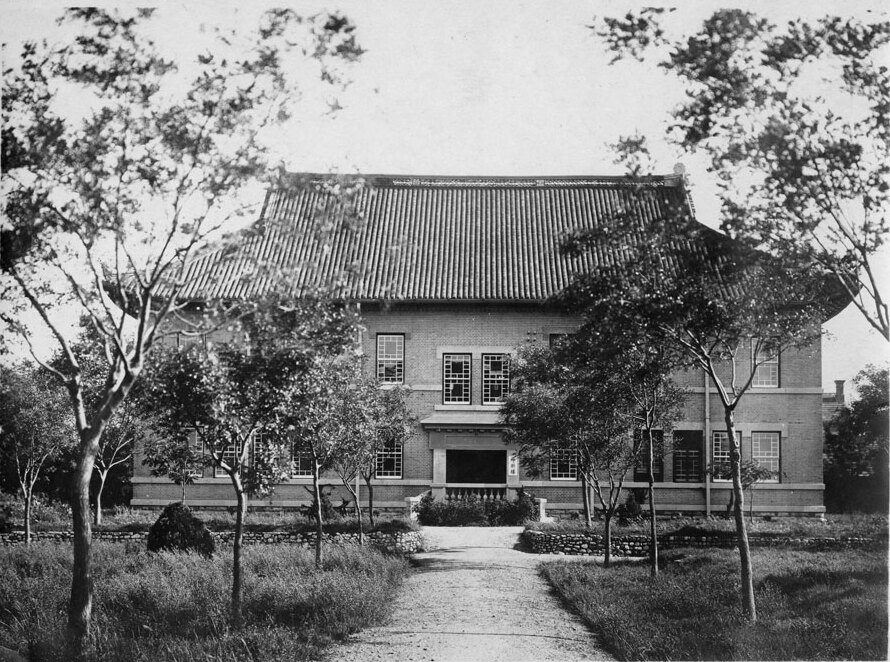
Hall of Theology at Cheeloo, c. 1940

In the late 1930s, Drake was appointed as Provincial Secretary of the BMS in Shandong. Alongside Zhang Sijing, he reestablished the Zhoucun Middle School (now Zibo No. 6 Middle School). Following the occupation of Shandong in the Second Sino-Japanese War, church activities became subject to increasing repression by Japanese occupation forces. Drake, alongside his wife and their son, visited England in 1938. Wartime conditions rendered educational opportunities unfeasible in China. Unwilling to subject his son to boarding school and the "whole sacrifice of the divided home", Drake returned to Shandong alone, while Dora and the child remained in England.

Japan initiated a major anti-British political campaign in July 1939. Missionaries were forced out of service, and three BMS hospitals in the province were shut down following a wave of death threats against Chinese employees. Drake remained confident in the ability of the Baptist church to survive in China, writing that it would "carry on whatever happens" under independent Chinese leadership. Relations with Japanese military authorities in Zhoucun improved in late 1939, following the appointment of a cordial military chief in the region. Baptist missionaries in the area were once again allowed to work alongside churches, and mission hospitals resumed operations.

=== Chinese Civil War and aftermath ===
Following the surrender of Japan, Drake and other Baptist missionaries in Shandong worked to restore the mission's institutions in the area, with a focus on medical facilities. Drake returned to Jinan shortly after the end of the war and reported significant damage to mission property in the city. He worked with local Chinese Baptist leaders to restore church hospitals and schools in the region. Efforts to restore operations at Cheeloo were frustrated by the Japanese military's use of the site as a military hospital during the war. Around 1,200 wounded Japanese soldiers, alongside hundreds of medical staff, remained on the campus in December 1945, several months after surrender. Drake helped to reopen the university's hospital itself in 1946, with material aid from the British, American, and Canadian Red Cross, alongside belated support from the United Nations Relief and Rehabilitation Administration and the Chinese National Relief and Rehabilitation Administration. Jinan alternated between Communist and Nationalist control during the reemerging Chinese Civil War; Drake described it as an "island held by guerrillas [...] surrounded by a sea of Communism".

In March 1946, Drake attempted to return home to visit his wife and child, whom he had not seen since 1938. Sea travel to Great Britain was subject to extreme delays during the period. Dora Drake attempted to secure air transport for her husband from the BMS, but this was repeatedly denied by the Mission.

Although relations between the missionaries and Communist forces were more relaxed in the city than other regions of Shandong, significant political resentment remained. The staff of the BMS hospital in Qingzhou was abducted by a small group of Communist soldiers during the evacuation of the city in late June 1947, allegedly to conscript them into providing medical service for Communist forces. Drake, alongside fellow missionary Ronald Still, negotiated with Nationalist, Communist, and American officials active in the region in order to secure the safety of the medical staff. Colonel Huang, a Communist official in Qingzhou, was receptive to the missionaries' requests and pledged to arrange their release; the staff was returned to the hospital after several months.

It is not possible to describe in detail here the conditions in which the University found itself during the year; but they may be surmised by reference to Luke 10:30. (Note: Luke 10:30: "And Jesus answering said, A certain man went down from Jerusalem to Jericho, and fell among thieves, which stripped him of his raiment, and wounded him, and departed, leaving him half dead.")

— Drake, Report of the English Baptist Mission, Shantung, for the year 1949

Communist forces established a firm control over Shandong with the capture of Jinan in late September 1948. Communist shelling of Nationalist fortifications on the Cheeloo University campus damaged nearly all the university's buildings. By this point, Drake was the sole remaining BMS member in the city. Missionaries in China came under increasingly strict surveillance under the People's Republic. They strictly avoided mentioning state persecution in correspondence home, euphemistically stating that the situation was "not possible to explain fully in letters". The Baptist church in Shandong continued independent growth, with BMS support mainly relegated to operations at Cheeloo.

=== Hong Kong ===
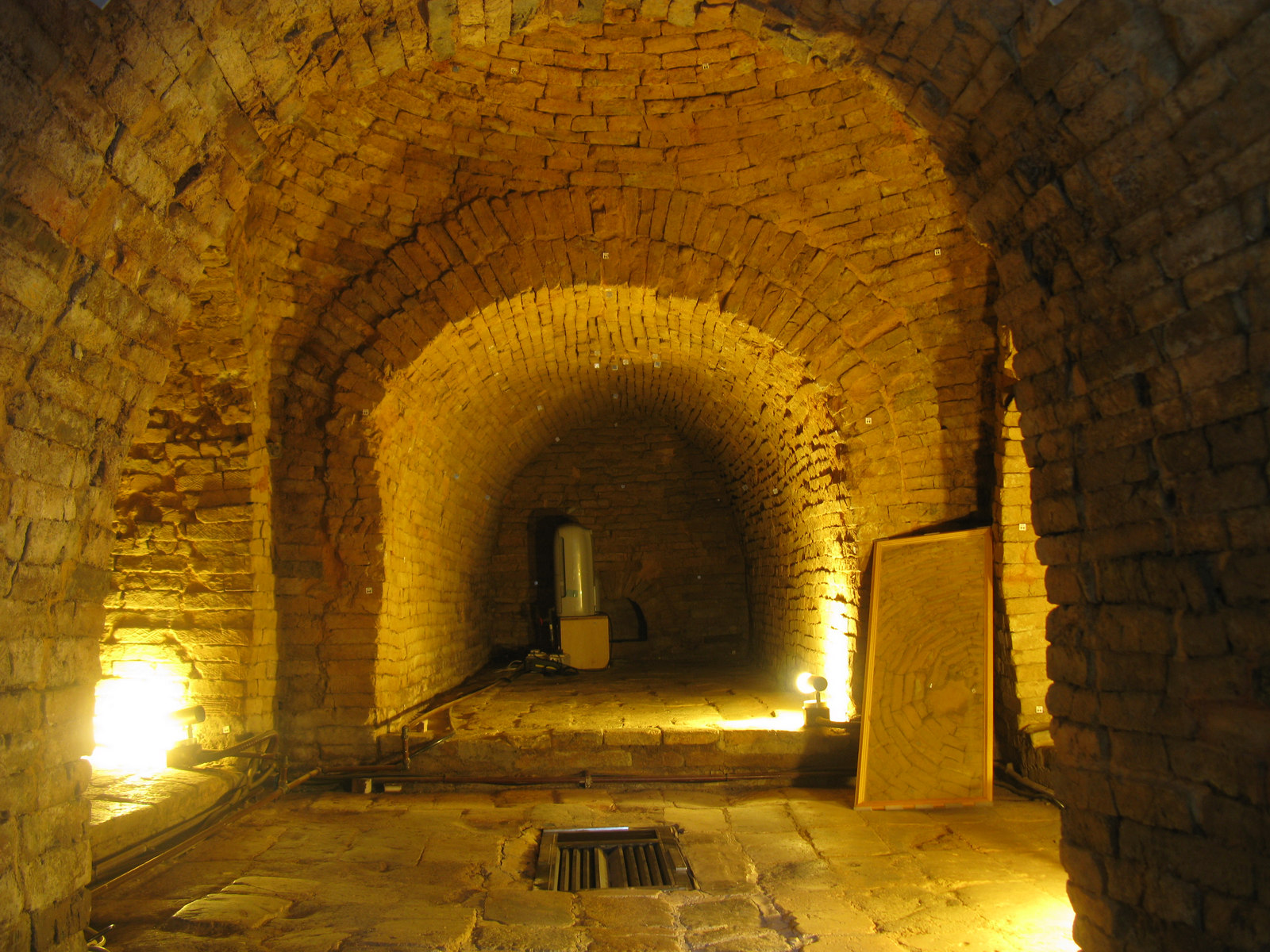
Interior of the Lei Cheng Uk Han Tomb, excavated by Drake in 1955.

Drake left Cheeloo in 1951, accepting a position as Professor of Chinese Studies at the University of Hong Kong in 1952. His appointment to the position followed a two-year vacancy; it was previously held by J. K. Rideout, who left the position a month after being appointed in 1950. Drake organized what would later become the university's Department of Chinese Studies. He recruited a number of prominent scholars to the university, including Jao Tsung-I, Lo Hsiang-lin, Tang Chun-i, and Mou Zongsan. The university placed greater emphasis on Chinese history classes for all three years of instruction, whereas it was previously reserved for third-year students. He led excavations of the Lei Cheng Uk Han Tomb in 1955, organizing a team consisting of both staff and students.

Drake additionally served as the Dean of the Faculty of Arts from 1956 to 1961. He established an art and archaeological collection at the Fung Ping Shan Building, appointing Mary Tregear as its first curator; this collection later became the University Museum and Art Gallery. Drake continued serving as Professor of the Department of Chinese Studies until his retirement in 1964. He died on 21 August 1974.

== Published works ==
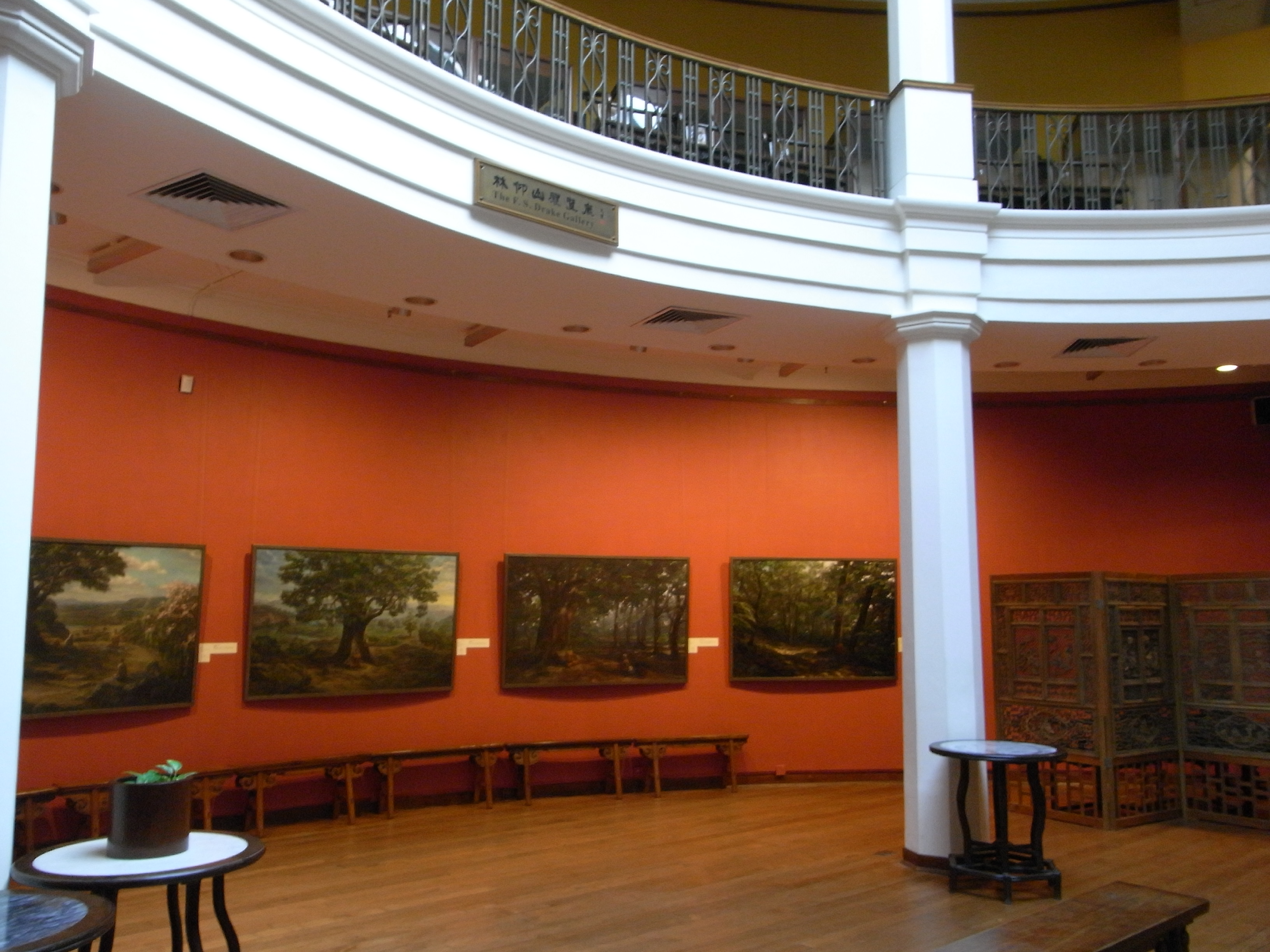
The F. S. Drake Gallery (林仰山展覽廳; Lín Yǎngshān zhǎnlǎntīng) at the University Museum and Art Gallery, Hong Kong

=== As author ===
==== Pre-1952 journal articles ====
- "The Tao Yuan: A New Religious and Spiritualistic Movement". The Chinese Recorder and Missionary Journal. 54 (3): 133–144. 1923.
- "Nestorian Literature of the T'ang Dynasty". The Chinese Recorder and Missionary Journal. 66: 291–300, 608–17, 677–87, 738–42. 1935.
- "Nestorian Monasteries of the T'ang Dynasty: And the Site of the Discovery of the Nestorian Tablet". Monumenta Serica: Journal of Oriental Studies. 2 (2): 293–340. 1936. doi:10.1080/02549948.1936.11745023.
- "Problems Before Christian Education in China". Religion in Education. 5 (4): 200–207. 1938. doi:10.1080/3808556147.
- "The Shên-T'ung Monastery and the Beginning of Buddhism in Shantung". Monumenta Serica: Journal of Oriental Studies. 4 (1): 1–39. 1939. doi:10.1080/02549948.1939.11745087.
- "Shang Dynasty Find at Ta-hsin Chuang, Shantung". The China Journal (2): 77–81. 1939.
- "Ta-hsin Chuang Again". The China Journal (1): 8–10. 1940a.
- "Stone Implements from Shantung". The China Journal (4): 138–144. 1940b.
- "Ancient Pottery from Shantung". Monumenta Serica: Journal of Oriental Studies. 4 (2): 383–405. 1940c. doi:10.1080/02549948.1940.11745103. JSTOR 40726762.
- "Mohammedanism in the T'ang Dynasty". Monumenta Serica: Journal of Oriental Studies. 8 (1): 1–40. 1943. doi:10.1080/02549948.1943.11745171. JSTOR 40725292.
- "Sculptured Stones of the Han Dynasty". Monumenta Serica: Journal of Oriental Studies. 8 (1): 280–318. 1943. doi:10.1080/02549948.1943.11745178. JSTOR 40725300.
- "The Christian teacher in China: I. The ancient Confucian background". Religion in Education. 15 (1). 1947. doi:10.1080/4708555977.
- "The Christian teacher in China: II. The modern system and the place of Christian education". Religion in Education. 15 (2). 1948. doi:10.1080/4708555977.
- "A Sculptured Panel from T'êng-Hsien". Monumenta Serica: Journal of Oriental Studies. 13 (1): 389–394. 1948. doi:10.1080/02549948.1948.11730929. JSTOR 40726564.

==== Pre-1952 books ====
- 創造教會的偉人 [Great Builders of The Church]. N.C.C.R.E. Lay Training Textbook (in Chinese). Translated by Zhang, Xueyan. Shanghai: Guangxuehui (廣學會). 1939.
- 教會史 [History of the Christian Church]. Cheeloo Manual (in Chinese). Shanghai: Guangxuehui (廣學會).
  - 第一卷: 古代教會 [Volume I: The Ancient Church]. 1940.
  - 第二卷: 中代教會 [Volume II: The Medieval Church]. 1941.
  - 第三卷: 近代教會 [Volume III: The Modern Church]. 1946.

==== Post-1952 works ====
- Chow, E. T.; Drake, F. S. (1959). "Kuan-Yao and Min-Yao: A Study on Imperial Porcelain and People's Porcelain from K'ang-Hsi to the End of the Ch'ing Dynasty". Archives of the Chinese Art Society of America. 13: 54–74. JSTOR 20067016.
- "The Study of Asia: a Heritage and a Task: Inaugural Address delivered on April 7, 1960". Journal of the Hong Kong Branch of the Royal Asiatic Society. 1: 11–17. 1960. JSTOR 23881283.
- "Nestorian Crosses and Nestorian Christians in China under the Mongols: A Lecture Delivered on December 11, 1961". Journal of the Hong Kong Branch of the Royal Asiatic Society. 2: 11–25. 1962. JSTOR 23881247.

=== As editor ===
- Drake, F. S.; Liu, Baimin, eds. (1955). 中國文選 [Selections of Chinese Literature]. Hong Kong: Hong Kong University Press. OCLC 502424775.
- Symposium on Historical, Archaeological and Linguistic Studies on Southern China, South-East Asia and the Hong Kong Region: Papers Presented at Meetings Held in September 1961 as Part of the Golden Jubilee Congress of the University of Hong Kong. Hong Kong: Hong Kong University Press. 1967.
