= Lei Cheng Uk Han Tomb Museum =

Museum and ancient tomb in Hong Kong

Lei Cheng Uk Han Tomb
- 李鄭屋漢墓 (Chinese)
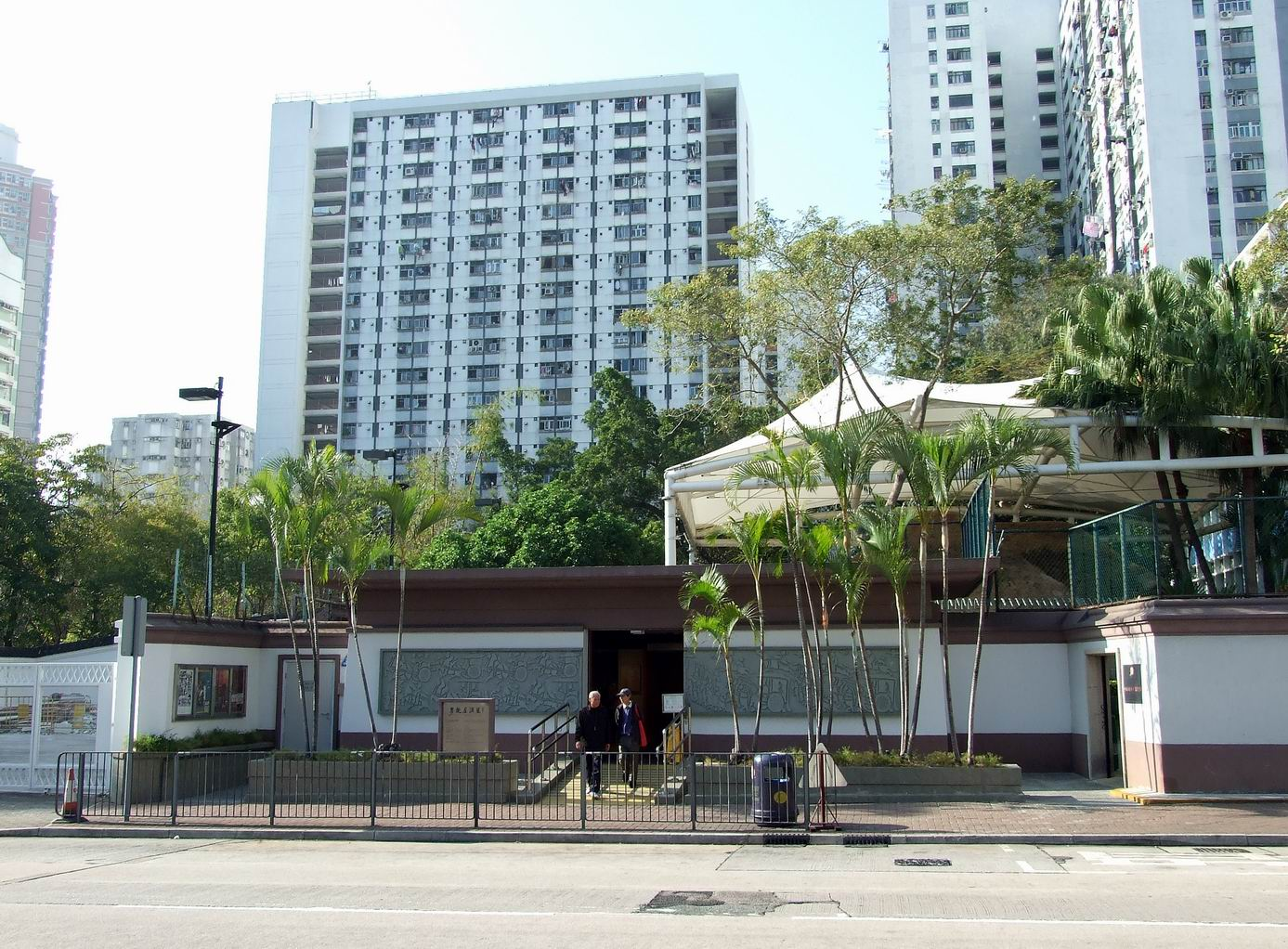
- Entrance of the Lei Cheng Uk Han Tomb Museum on Tonkin Street, with Lei Cheng Uk Estate in the background.

- Location within Hong Kong
- 22°20′17.14″N 114°09′36.08″E
- Location: 41 Tonkin Street, Cheung Sha Wan, Sham Shui Po District, Hong Kong
- Region: Kowloon Peninsula

History
- Built: Han dynasty

Site notes
- Restored: 1957
- Restored by: Government of Hong Kong
- Governing body: Leisure and Cultural Services Department
- Management: Hong Kong Museum of History
- Visitors: 29,000 (in 2024)
- Public access: No

Declared Monument of Hong Kong
- Type: Gazetted monument
- Designated: November 1988; 37 years ago
- Reference no.: 35

Lei Cheng Uk Han Tomb Museum
- Traditional Chinese: 李鄭屋漢墓博物館
- Simplified Chinese: 李郑屋汉墓博物馆
- Cantonese Yale: Léihjehng'ūk honmouh bokmahtgún
Transcriptions
Standard Mandarin
- Hanyu Pinyin: Lǐzhèngwū hànmù bówùguǎn
- Wade–Giles: Li^{3}-chêng^{4}-wu^{1} han^{4}-mu^{4} po^{2}-wu^{4}-kuan^{3}
- IPA: [lì.ʈʂə̂ŋ.ú xân.mû pwǒ.û.kwàn]
Yue: Cantonese
- Yale Romanization: Léihjehng'ūk honmouh bokmahtgún
- Jyutping: lei5 zeng6 uk1 hon3 mou6 bok3 mat6 gun2
- IPA: [lej˩˧.tsɛŋ˨.ʊk̚˥ hɔn˧.mɔw˨ pɔk̚˧.mɐt̚˨.kun˧˥]

The Lei Cheng Uk Han Tomb Museum (Chinese: 李鄭屋漢墓博物館) is a museum in Hong Kong which houses an ancient Chinese tomb. It is believed to have been built during the Eastern Han dynasty (AD 25–220) for a Chinese officer attached to the local garrison. The museum, administratively a branch of the Hong Kong Museum of History, is located at 41 Tonkin Street, in Cheung Sha Wan, Sham Shui Po District, in the northwestern part of the Kowloon Peninsula of Hong Kong.

== History ==
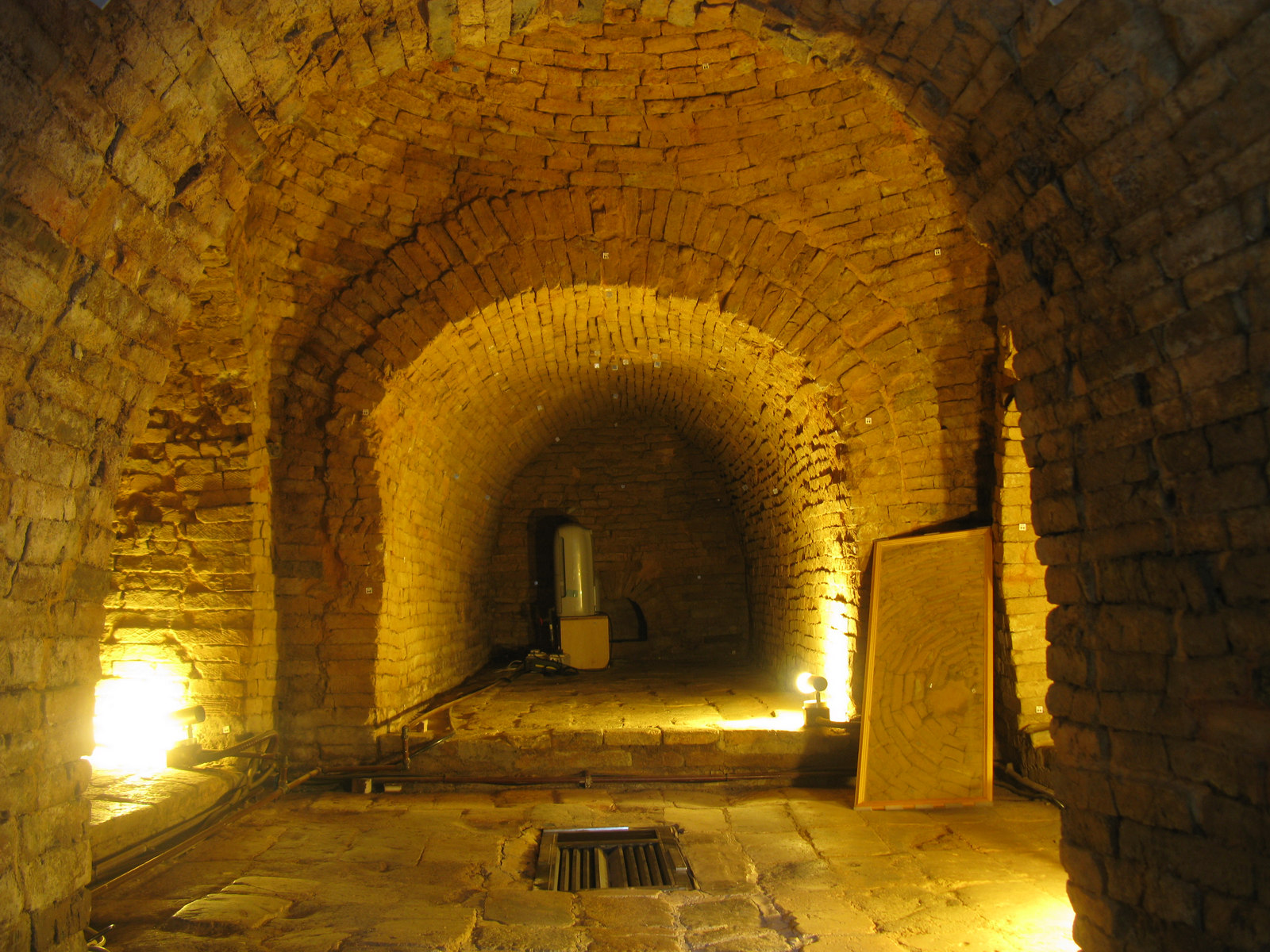
Interior of the tomb

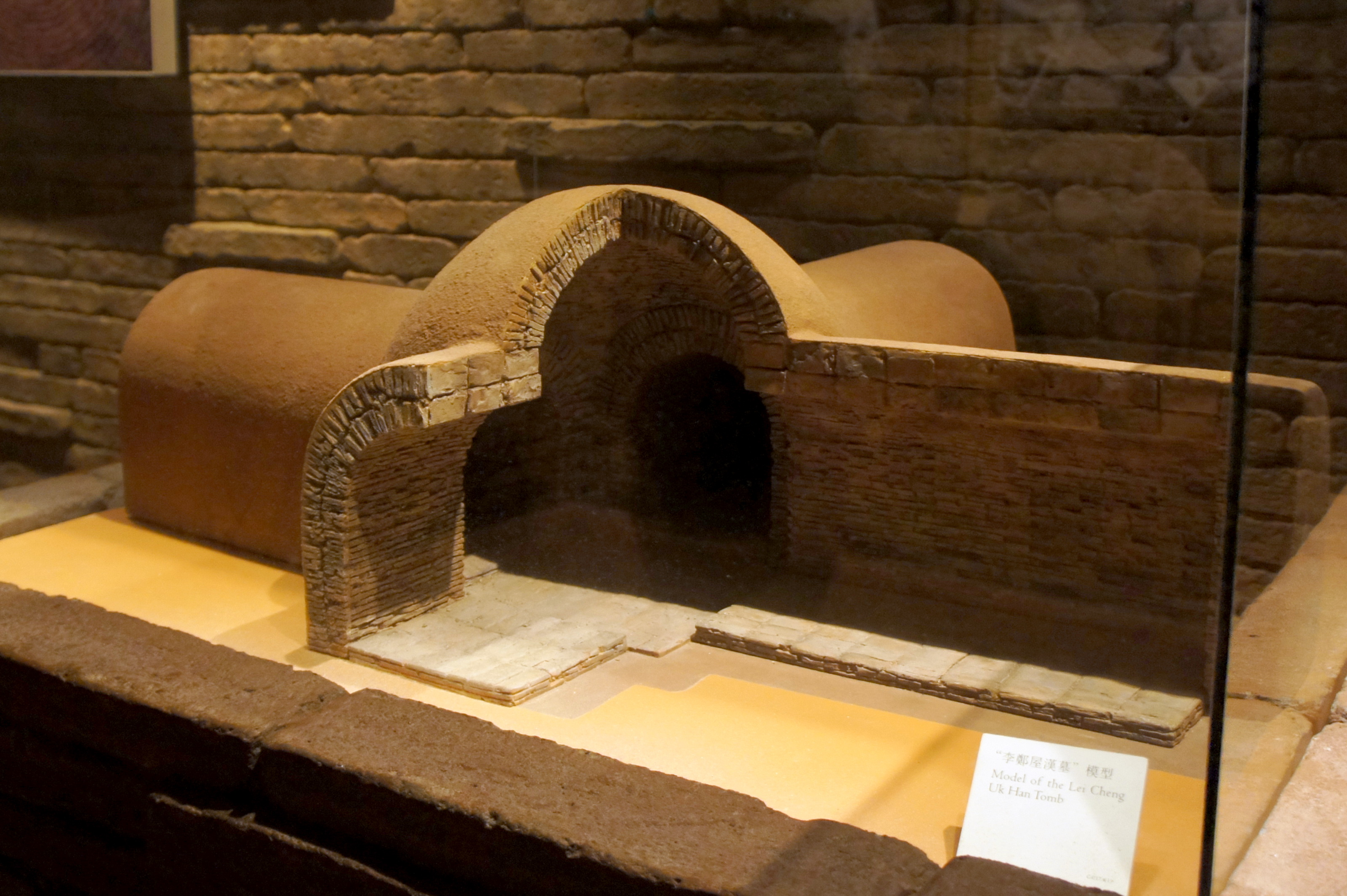
Model of the tomb, at the Hong Kong Museum of History

According to its structure, inscriptions on the tomb bricks and tomb finds, it is believed that the tomb was built in the Eastern Han dynasty (25–220 AD). The Hong Kong Museum of History explains the tomb as follows:

The cross-shaped tomb with domed roof was a popular tomb design in Guangdong at the time. The pottery ding tripod, zun wine warmer, kui (魁) food container and zhi (卮) wine container were common daily utensils and often appeared on pictorial bricks in Han tombs. The set of four pottery models – a house, granary, well and stove – were customary burial objects in the period. The characters Panyu (番禺) in the brick inscription refer to the county in which the Hong Kong region was located in the Han dynasty, and the calligraphic style of the characters Xue Shi (薛師) was widely used for Eastern Han bronze and stone inscriptions.

Although a number of Han tombs have been discovered in Guangdong province, south of China; the Lei Cheng Uk Han Tomb is the only Han brick tomb unearthed in Hong Kong to date. The tomb is an important site to understand the ancient history of Hong Kong and the early activities of Han people.

=== Discovery and preservation ===
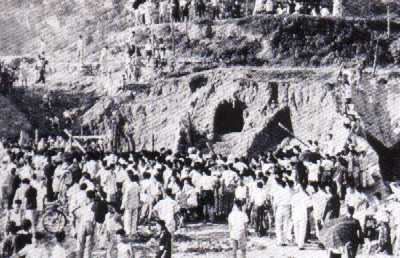
Discovery of the tomb in 1955

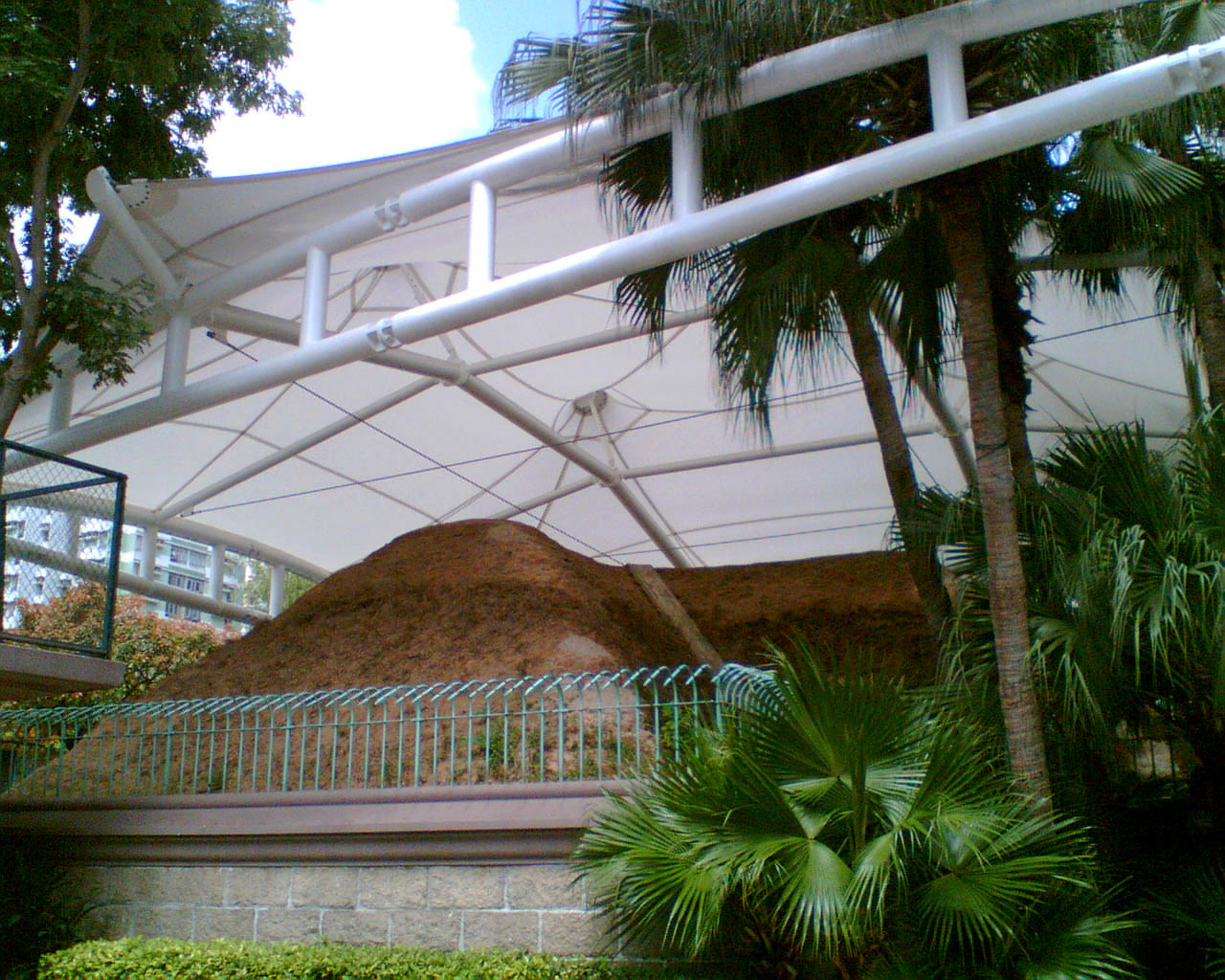
Outside view of the tomb and protective canopy

The tomb was accidentally discovered in August 1955, when the Hong Kong Government was levelling a hill slope for the construction of resettlement buildings at Lei Cheng Uk Village (present-day Lei Cheng Uk Estate). The tomb was then excavated by members of University of Hong Kong (HKU) and workers of the Public Works Department, under the supervision of Professor Frederick S. Drake, former head of the Chinese Department at HKU. After excavation, the government intended to demolish the tomb, but the tomb was eventually preserved due to high public interest. The tomb and its exhibition hall were formally opened to the public in 1957. In November 1988, the Han Tomb was declared as a gazetted monument by the Hong Kong Government, and is now protected and preserved permanently under the Antiquities and Monuments Ordinance.

Since the mid-1980s, visitors have no longer been allowed inside the tomb due to conservation concerns. It can instead only be viewed through glass panel at the entrance passage. The tomb is sealed in a temperature- and humidity-controlled environment, and is protected by concrete, waterproofing layers, topsoil, and turf. Following rainwater leakage problems, the tomb was renovated in 2005, with the addition of a canopy to cover the tomb.

3D laser scanning technology in the digital recording of the structures was applied to capture 3D images of the structure. An exhibition hall opened in 1988, when the tomb was declared a gazetted monument. The hall was refurbished in 2005. Details on the discovery and characteristics of the tomb, as well as bronze and pottery artefacts found in the tomb are on permanent display in the exhibition hall.

== The museum ==
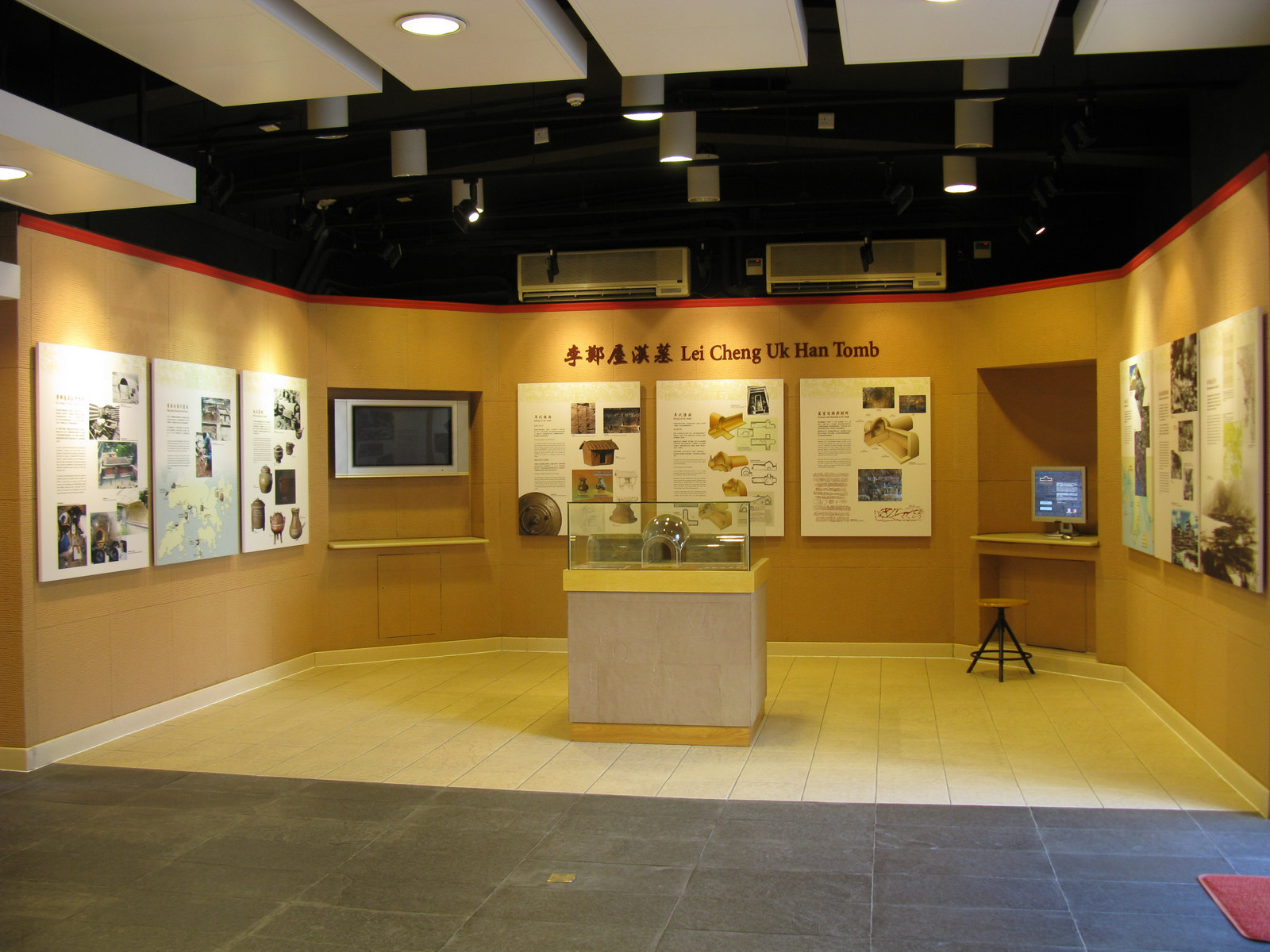
Displays in the museum

The tomb and gallery came under the management of the former Urban Council in 1969. The museum later became a branch of the Hong Kong Museum of History in 1975. As such, it is presently managed by the Leisure and Cultural Services Department of the Hong Kong government.

A 3D digital animation in the exhibition hall provides a detailed view of the interior of the tomb. Moreover, a 1:1 replica of the inside of the Lei Cheng Uk Han Tomb is displayed at the Hong Kong Museum of History.

=== Exhibition Hall ===
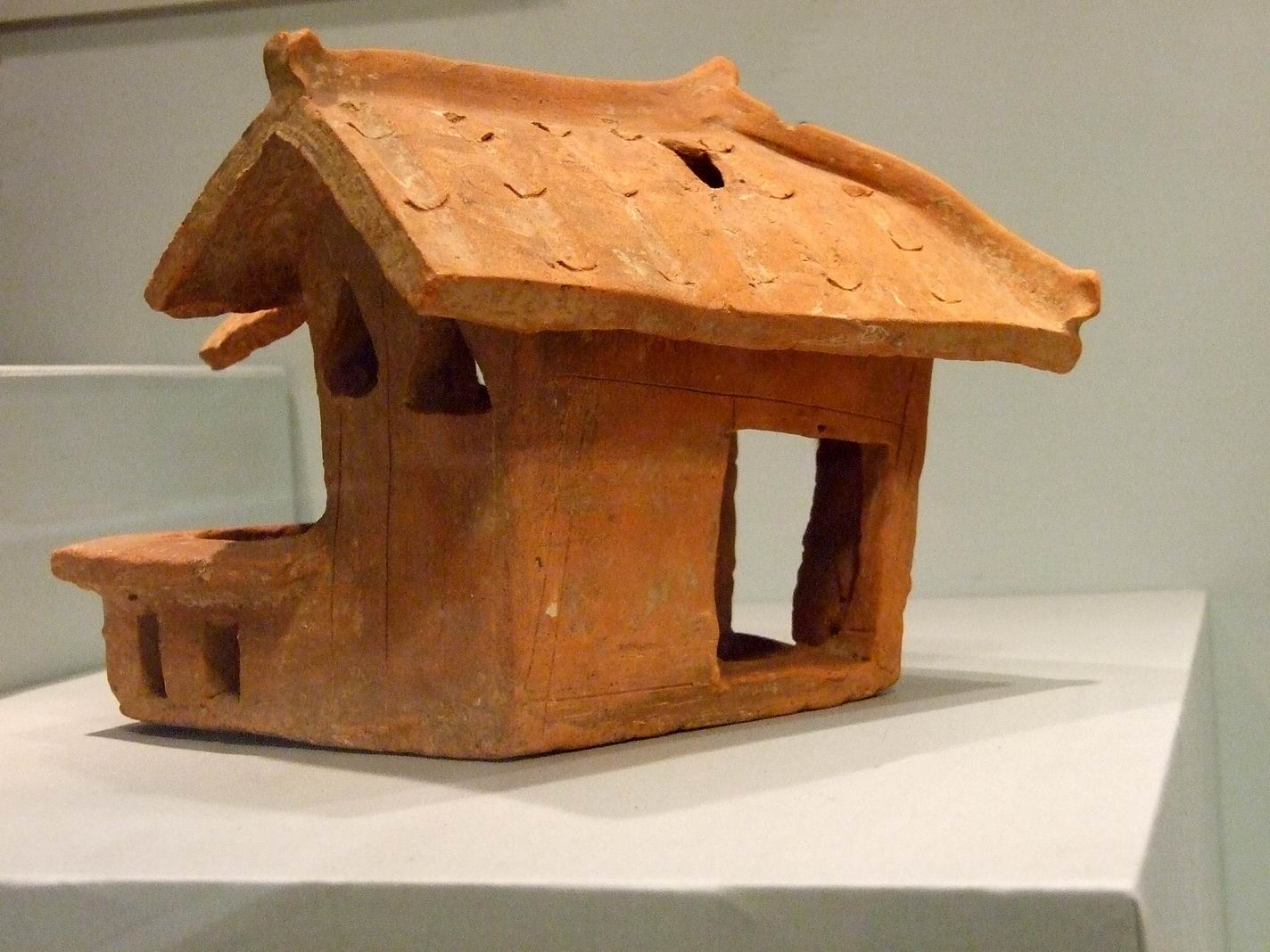
Granary model found at the tomb

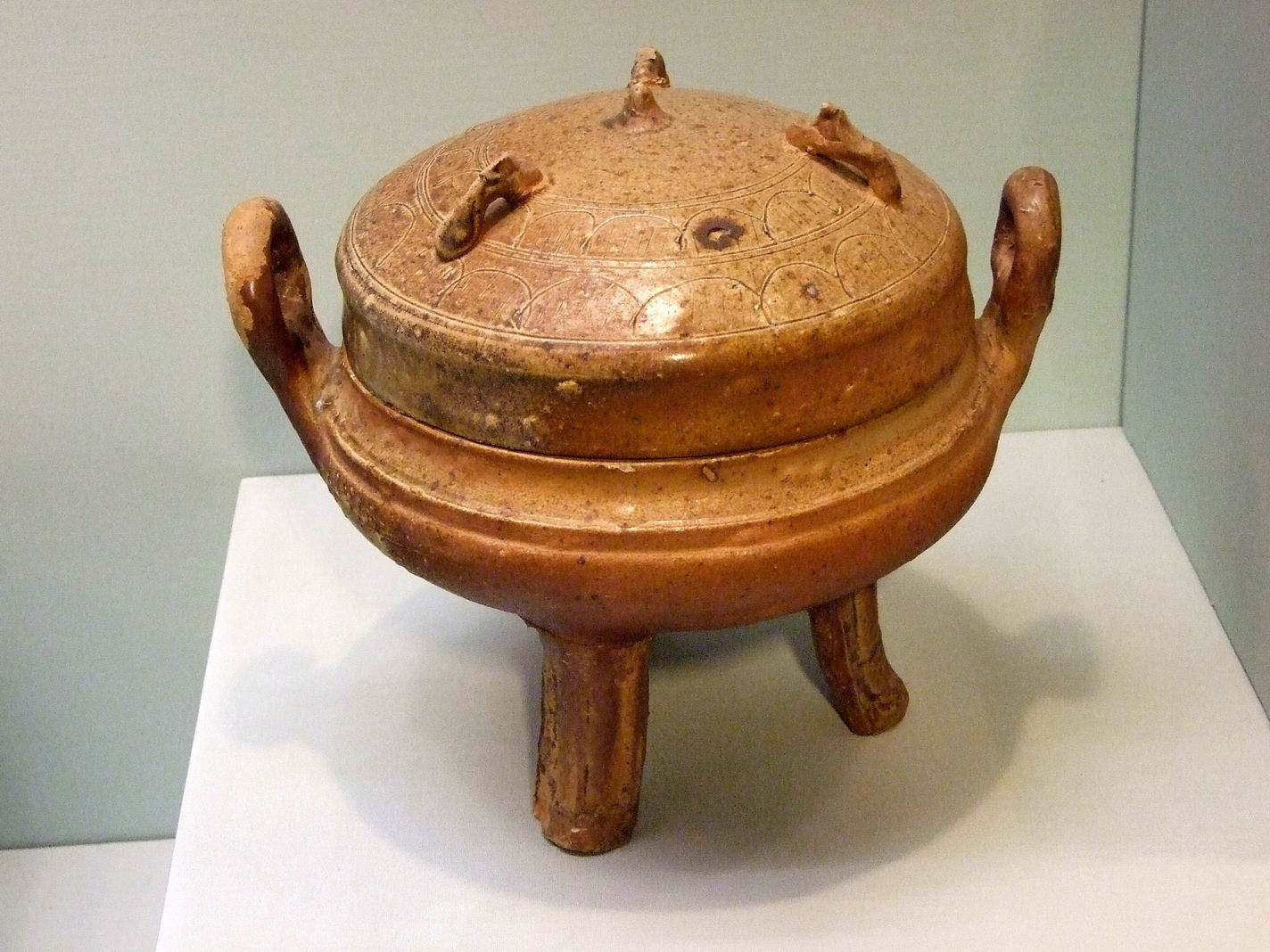
Ding found at the tomb

The Exhibition Hall is located next to the tomb. The first section is about food and drink in Han as it seems because most of what was found in the Han tomb is related to food. The display of this section begins with the old Chinese adage, 'food is the first necessity of the people'. There is a map depicting food distribution, a pictogram of rice distribution and a table of the major food groups. There are also three replicas of figurines. Two of the figurines are cooks, and another one is a farmer.

The second section is about the excavation of the Han tomb. The excavation process, the inside of the tomb and the archaeologists at work are shown with several photographs. The tomb's structure and layout are shown with the models and plans. This displays also how the professionals dated the tomb by using the inscriptions on the bricks.

The third part of the gallery shows the artefacts found in the tomb. As the only Eastern Han dynasty brick tomb ever found in Hong Kong, the Lei Cheng Uk Han Tomb has invaluable historic value containing 58 items found on site. Objects include cooking utensils, food containers, storage jars and models (a house, a granary, a well and a stove) made of pottery (50), as well as bowls, basins, mirrors, and bells made of bronze (8). No human skeletal remains were found.

== Transportation ==
The Lei Cheng Uk Han Tomb Museum is served by the Cheung Sha Wan station of the MTR (exit A3).

== Surrounding ==
The Han Garden, located next to the museum, was completed in December 1993. The features in this Chinese garden were built following the style of the Han dynasty and include pavilions, terraces, towers, fishponds and rock sculptures.

Once overlooking the seashore, the site of the tomb is now almost 2,000 m from the sea, following a series of land reclamations.

== See also ==
- List of museums in Hong Kong
- Declared monuments of Hong Kong
- Museum of the Mausoleum of the Nanyue King, in Guangzhou
