= Lei Cheng Uk Estate =

Housing estate in Kowloon, Hong Kong

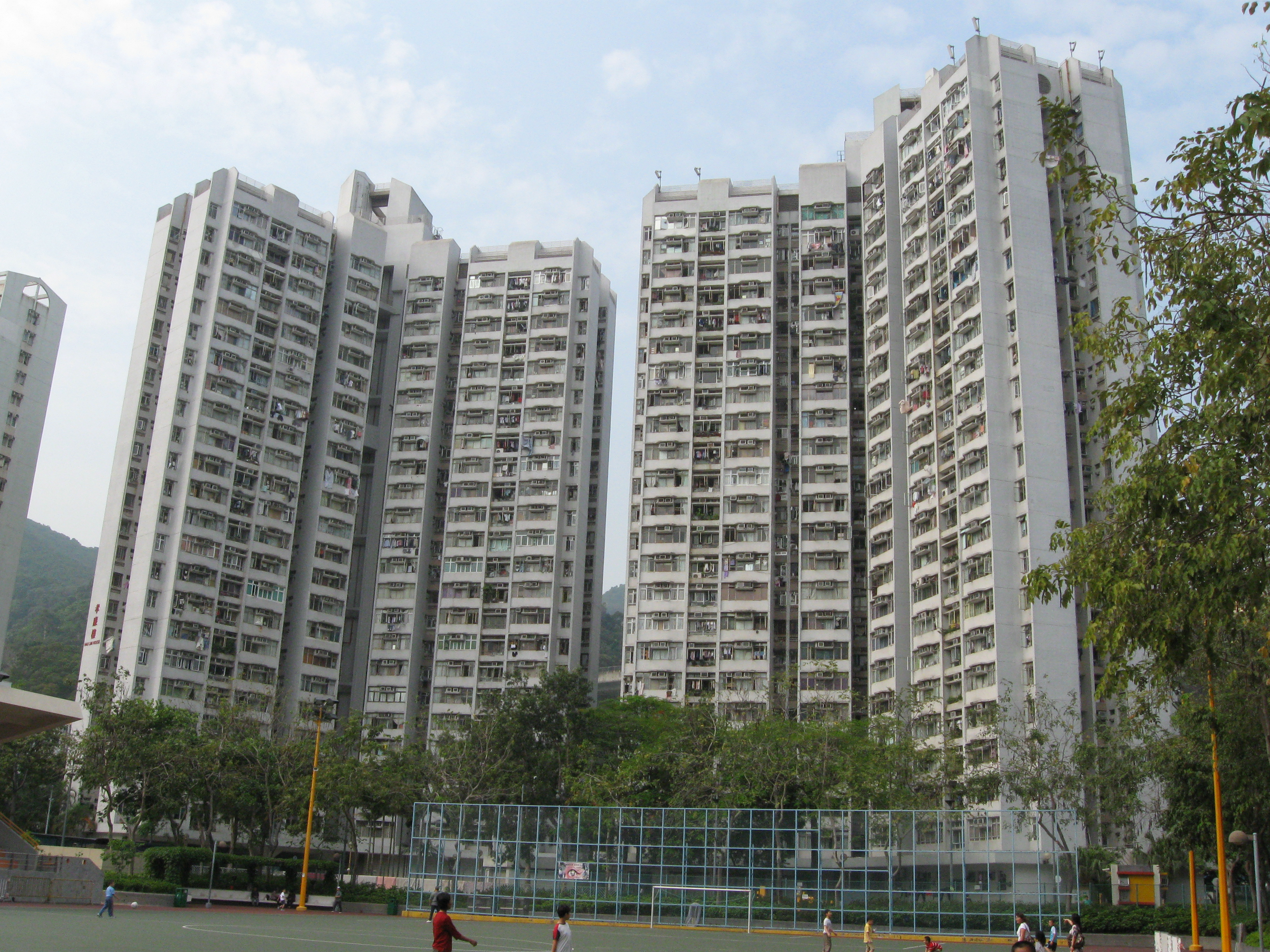
- Hau Lim House and Hau Chi House, Lei Cheng Uk Estate
- Interactive map of Lei Cheng Uk Estate

General information
- Location: 10 Fat Tseung Street, Cheung Sha Wan; Kowloon, Hong Kong
- Coordinates: 22.3388°N 114.1595°E
- Status: Completed
- Category: Public rental housing and Tenants Purchase Scheme
- Population: 12,043 (2016)
- No. of blocks: 10

Construction
- Authority: Hong Kong Housing Authority

Lei Cheng Uk Estate
- Chinese: 李鄭屋邨
- Cantonese Yale: léih jehng ūk chyūn
Transcriptions
Yue: Cantonese
- Yale Romanization: léih jehng ūk chyūn
- Jyutping: lei5 zeng6 nguk1 cyun1

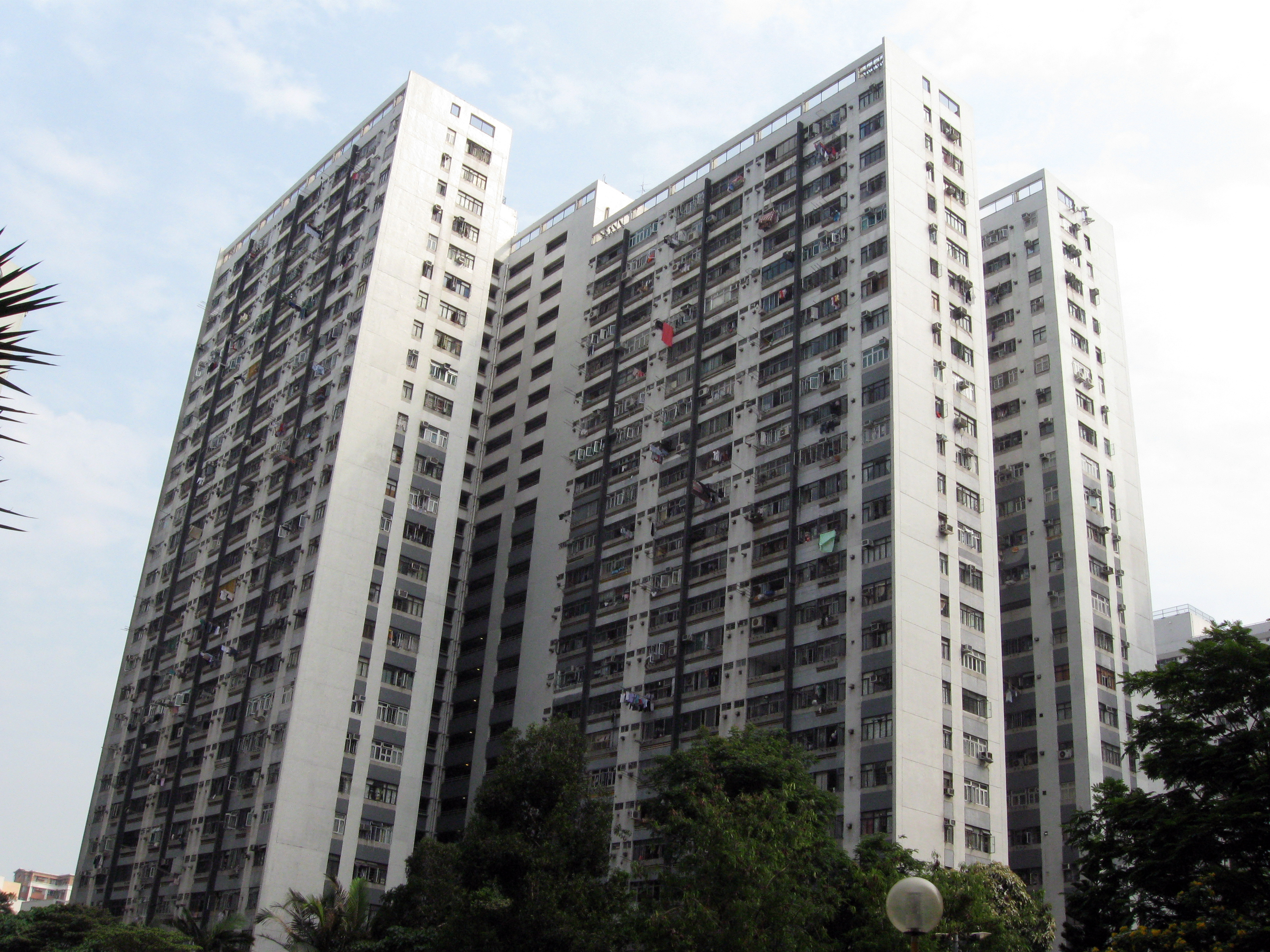
Yan Oi House and Chung Hau House, Lei Cheng Uk Estate

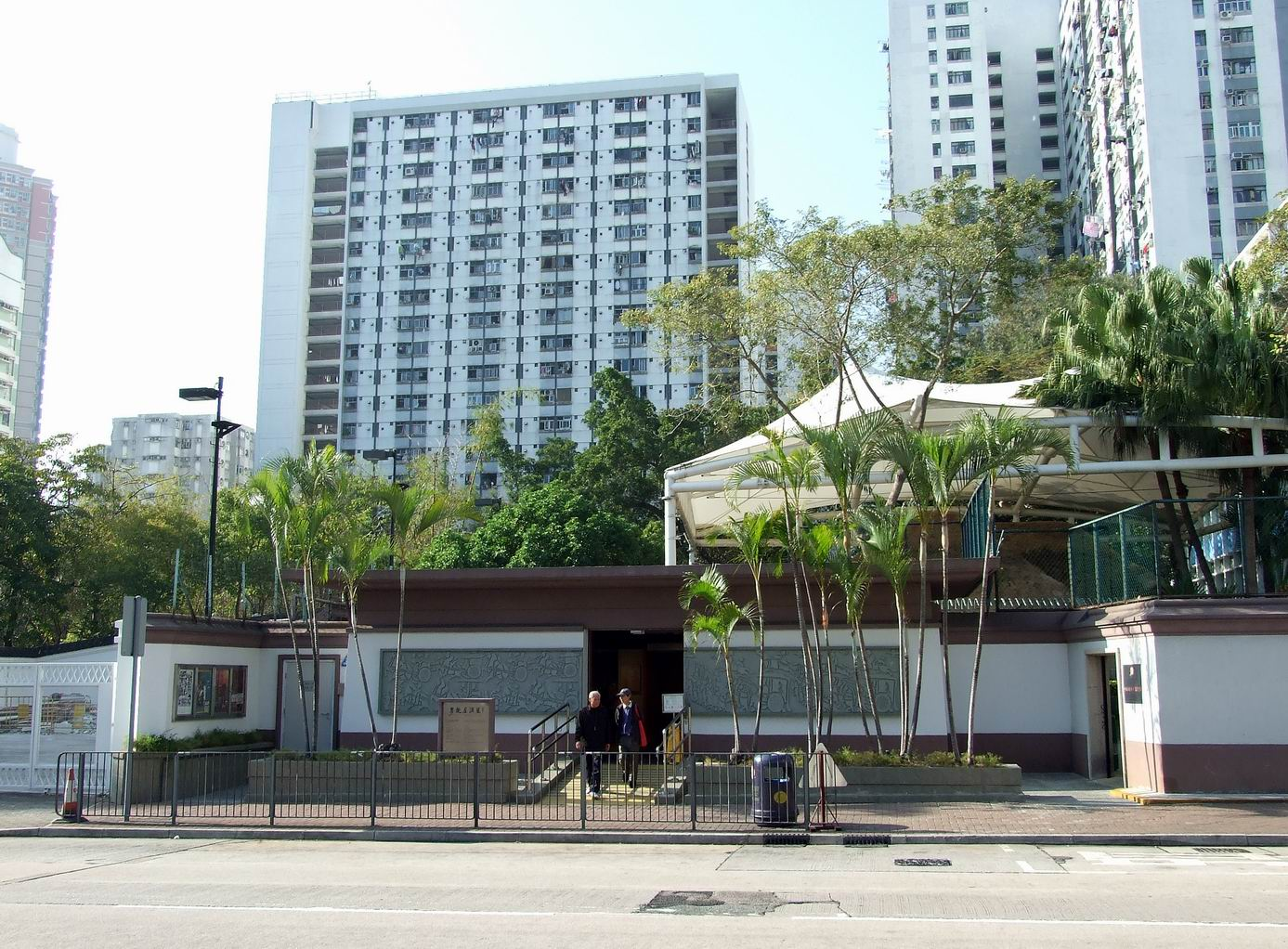
Entrance of the Lei Cheng Uk Han Tomb Museum on Tonkin Street, with Lei Cheng Uk Estate in the background.

Lei Cheng Uk Estate (Chinese: 李鄭屋邨; Jyutping: Lei5 Zeng6 Uk1 Cyun1; Cantonese Yale: Léihjehng'ūk Chyūn) is a public housing estate and Tenants Purchase Scheme estate in Lei Cheng Uk, downhill from Cheung Sha Wan, Kowloon, Hong Kong, located near the So Uk Estate. Since the redevelopment in 1980s, the estate consists of 10 residential buildings completed in 1984, 1989 and 1990 respectively. In 2002, some of the flats were sold to tenants through Tenants Purchase Scheme Phase 5. The estate is now managed by Hong Kong Housing Society.

== History ==
In 1955, while levelling a hill to construct the Lei Cheng Uk Resettlement Area, workers discovered an ancient brick tomb dating to the Eastern Han dynasty (25–220CE). A total of 58 pottery and bronze objects were found inside the tomb. The site is now the Lei Cheng Uk Han Tomb Museum.

In 1956, during Double Ten Day celebrations, a government officer ordered that a Republic of China flag be removed from the Lei Cheng Uk estate. This escalated into the Hong Kong 1956 riots, where Pro-ROC camp and pro-Communists clashed.

== Houses ==
Name	Type	Completion
Chung Hau House	Double H	1984
Yan Oi House	Double H	1984
Shun Yee House	Old Slab	1984
Wo Ping House	Old Slab	1984
Tao Tak House	Linear 1	1989
Wo Muk House	Linear 3	1989
Lim Kit House	Linear 3	1989
Lai Yeung House	Linear 3	1989
Hau Chi House	Trident 4	1990
Hau Lim House	Trident 4	1990

== Demographics ==
According to the 2016 by-census, Lei Cheng Uk Estate had a population of 12,043. The median age was 51.8 and the majority of residents (96 per cent) were of Chinese ethnicity. The average household comprised 2.6 persons. The median monthly household income of all households (i.e. including both economically active and inactive households) was HK$17,090.

== See also ==
- Public housing estates in Cheung Sha Wan
- San Wui Commercial Society YMCA of Hong Kong Christian School
