= Dragon Centre =

Shopping centre in Sham Shui Po, Hong Kong

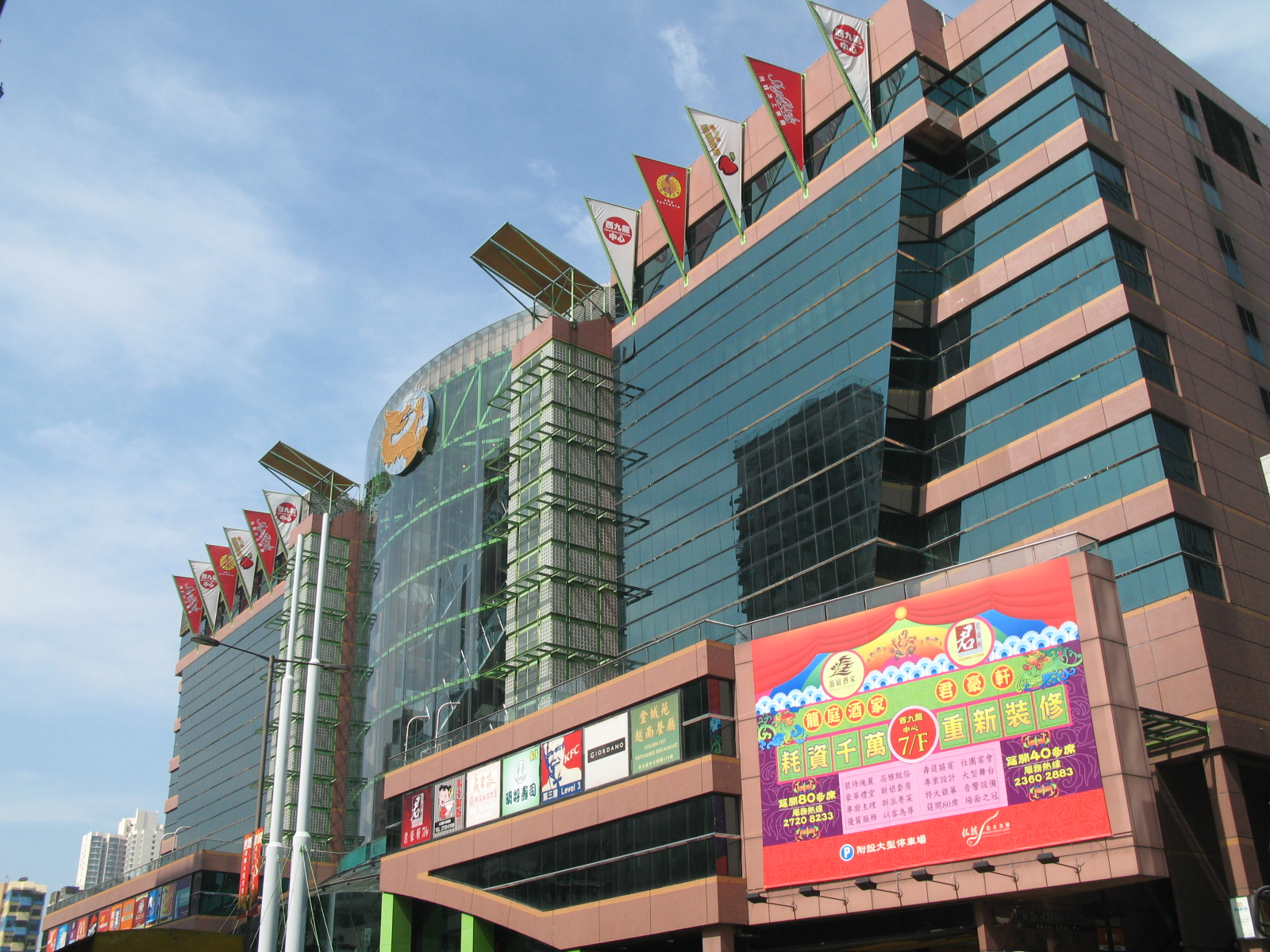
- Exterior view
- Location: Sham Shui Po, New Kowloon, Hong Kong
- Coordinates: 22°19′52″N 114°09′35″E
- Address: 37K Yen Chow Street
- Opened: 1994; 32 years ago
- Developer: Eton Properties
- Manager: Various
- Owner: Eton Properties
- Architect: Wong Tung & Partners
- Floor area: 45,000 m^{2} (480,000 sq ft); 77,700 m^{2} GFA
- Floors: 9 floors of retail 5 basement floors (service)
- Website: dragoncentre.com.hk

Dragon Centre
- Traditional Chinese: 西九龍中心
- Simplified Chinese: 西九龙中心
- Literal meaning: West Kowloon Centre
Transcriptions
Standard Mandarin
- Hanyu Pinyin: Xī Jiǔlóng Zhōngxīn
Yue: Cantonese
- Yale Romanization: Sāigáulùhng jūngsām
- Jyutping: Sai^{1}gau^{2}lung^{4} zung^{1}sam^{1}

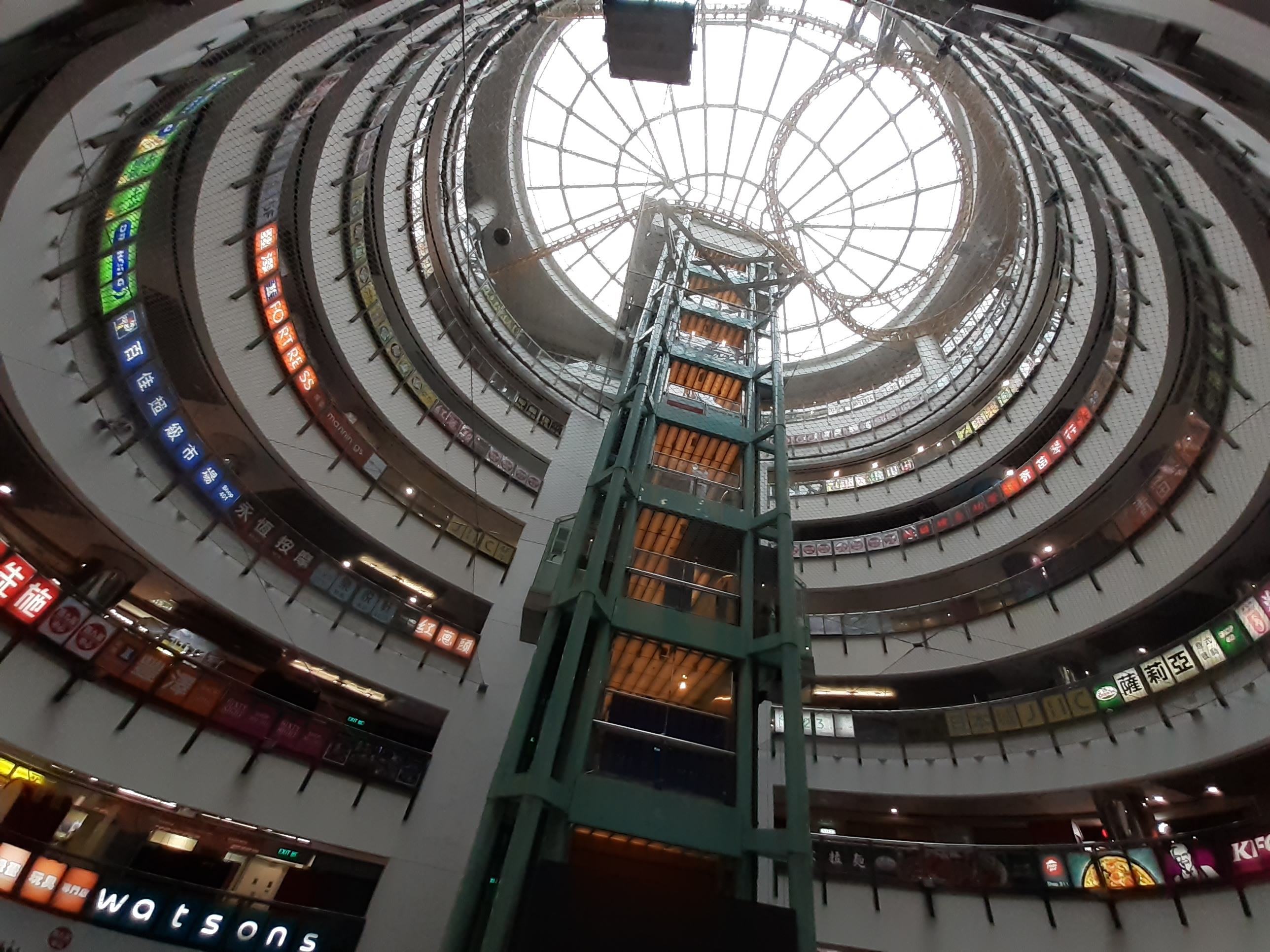
Atrium of Dragon Centre.

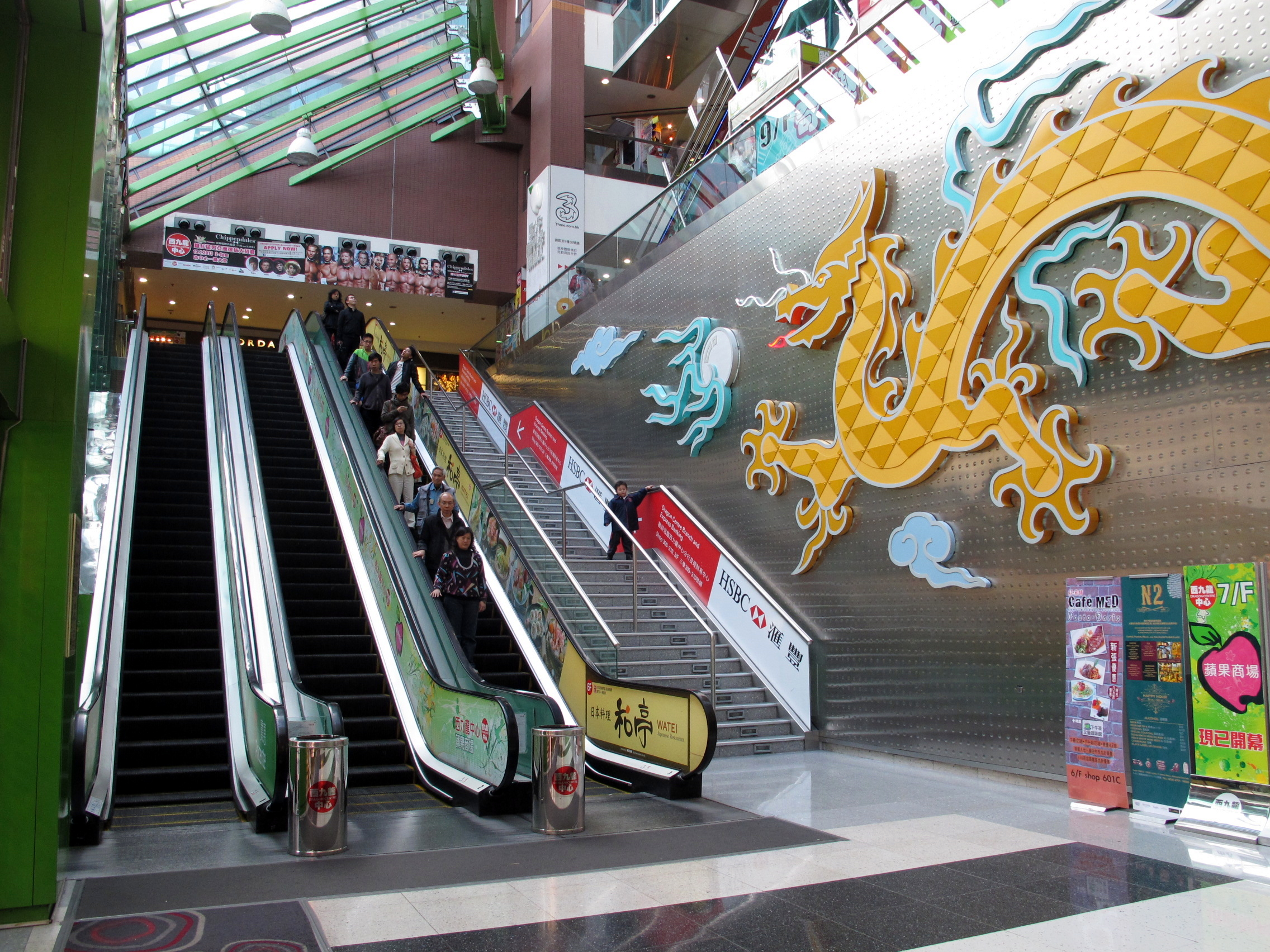
Ground floor of Dragon Centre.

Dragon Centre is a nine-storey shopping centre in the Sham Shui Po area of New Kowloon, Hong Kong.

== History ==
Located beside the historic Sham Shui Po Police Station, the mall was built on part of the site of the former Sham Shui Po Camp, a prisoner-of-war camp for Commonwealth forces captured during the Japanese occupation of Hong Kong, which was also used to house Vietnamese refugees in the late 1970s and 1980s.

== Features ==
The leading tenant is Sincere, a department store. Sunlight shines from the skylight through to the first floor. A bus terminus is located on the ground floor.

The ninth floor features Sky Fantasia (奇趣天地), a children's entertainment centre, and an indoor roller coaster, the Sky Train (天龍過山車). This hangs from the roof and was the second indoor roller coaster in Hong Kong (the first was located in the Wonderful World of Whimsy in Cityplaza), but it has been closed since the mid-2000s. The eighth floor features an ice skating rink, the Sky Rink (飛龍冰上樂園), and a food court.

The Dragon Centre won the Hong Kong Institute of Architects 1994 Certificate of Merit Award.

== Anchors and retailers ==
- Sixty Eight Store
- Apple Mall (蘋果商場), a mall-within-a-mall, split into 3 levels on the 5th, 7th, and 9th floors
- Baleno
- Bossini
- BSX
- City Chain
- Fortress World
- Pizza Hut
- McDonald's
- KFC
- Yoshinoya
- Ajisen Ramen
- Pokka Cafe
- Kee Wah Bakery
- Aji Ichiban Co., Ltd
- Bank of China
- HSBC ATM
- 7-Eleven
- Watsons
- Sincere
- Mannings
- ParknShop Superstore
- Lenscrafters
- Jumpin Gym USA
- Fairwood
- Cafe 360
- Kumon

== Transport ==
The Dragon Centre is served by the Sham Shui Po station of the MTR.
