= Sham Shui Po Barracks =

British Army facility built in the 1920s in Hong Kong

Coordinates: 22.332°N 114.158°E

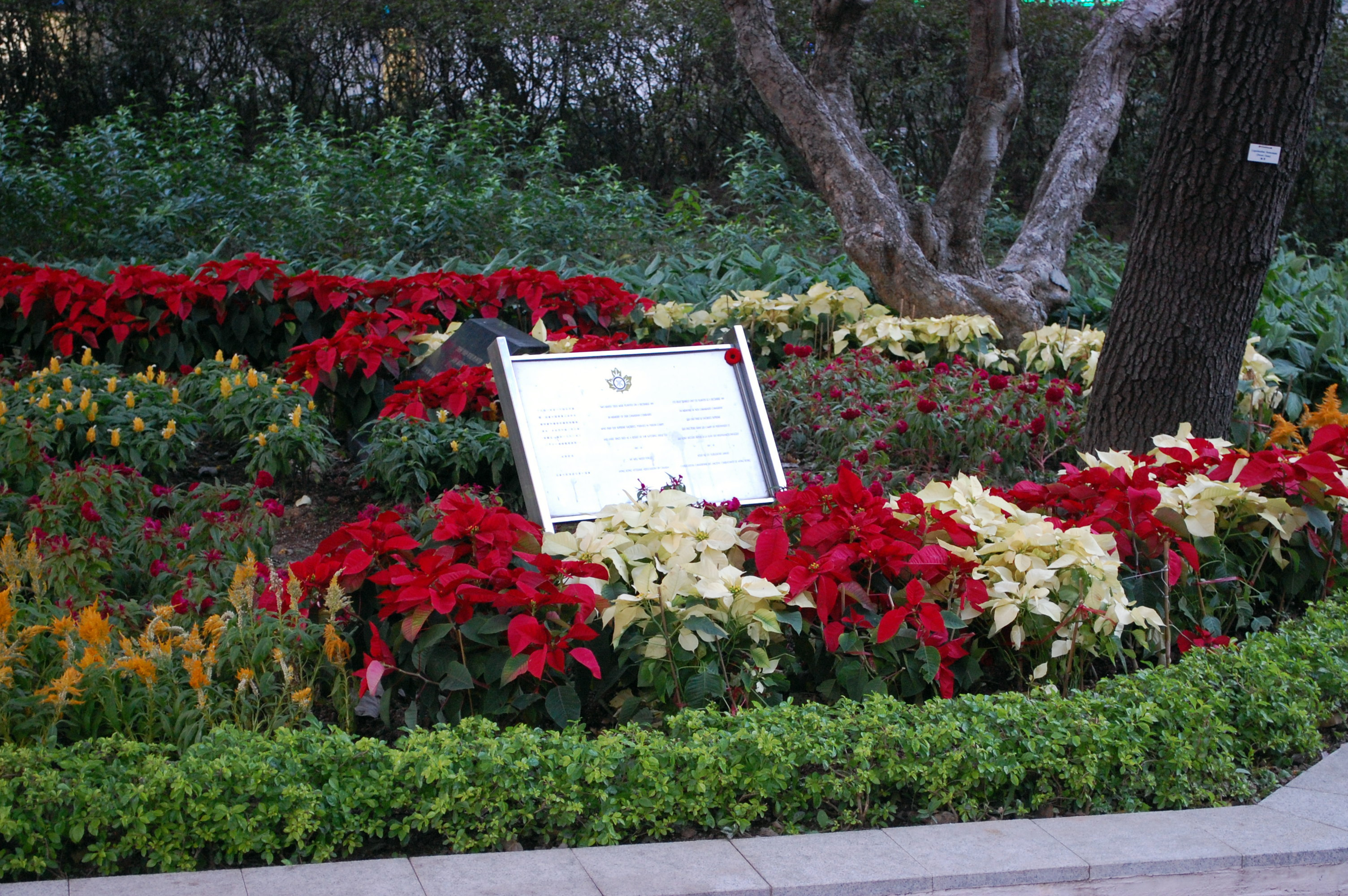
Canadian POW memorial

Sham Shui Po Barracks was a British Army facility built in the 1920s in the Sham Shui Po area of Kowloon, Hong Kong. The base was bounded by Fuk Wa Street to the east, by Yen Chow Street and to the west by Tonkin Street and Camp Street.

The buildings on one side were known as Hankow Barracks, and the other Nanking Barracks. There was a large parade ground. Smaller buildings were later added, and the large Jubilee Buildings were constructed as married quarters.

== World War II ==
During World War II, the Imperial Japanese Army used the facility as a prisoner of war (POW) camp for British, Indian and Canadian soldiers. This was the main POW Camp in Hong Kong, operating from before the British surrendered the Colony, until Japan surrendered at the end of the Second World War. By the later date, it was the only POW facility operating in Hong Kong, bar the hospital at the Central British School (now King George V School). Many POWs died here, especially in the diphtheria epidemic of 1942, and all shipments of POWs to Japan left from Sham Shui Po's Bamboo Pier.

== After the war ==
In 1959, the military handed a strip of land within the base to the Hong Kong government so that Lai Chi Kok Road could be extended.

In the late 1970s and early 1980s the camp was used to house Vietnamese refugees.

The camp was re-developed for housing in the early 1990s. None of the former military structures exist and only plaques commemorating the POW camp remain, together with maple trees commemorating the Canadians held here. These can be found at Sham Shui Po Park, also part of the former base.

== See also ==
- Dragon Centre
- Lindsay Tasman Ride
