= Sham Shui Po station =

MTR station in Kowloon, Hong Kong

Sham Shui Po 深水埗
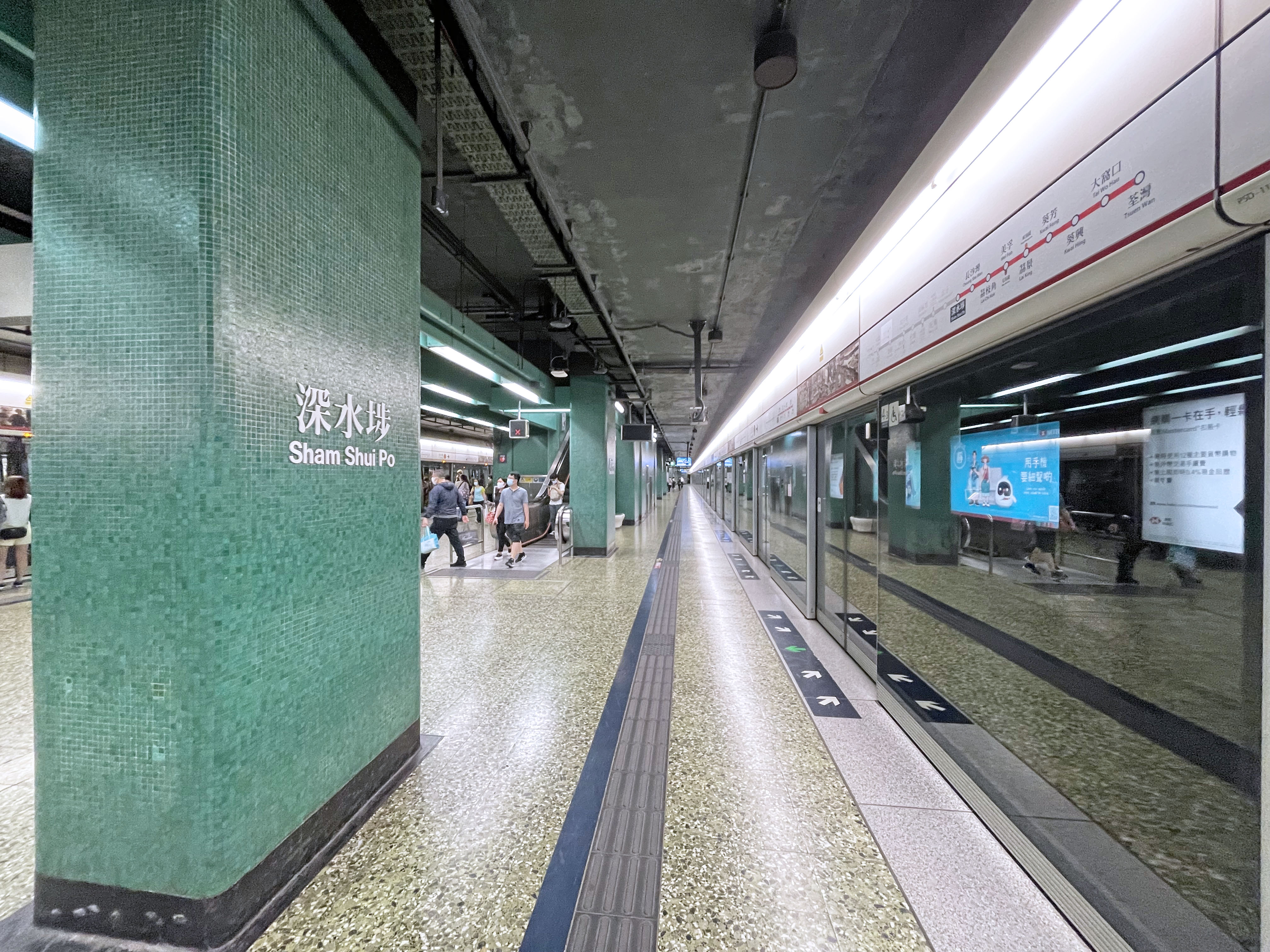
- Platform 1

Chinese name
- Chinese: 深水埗
- Cantonese Yale: Sāmséuibóu
- Literal meaning: Deep Water Pier
Transcriptions
Standard Mandarin
- Hanyu Pinyin: Shēnshuǐbù
Yue: Cantonese
- Yale Romanization: Sāmséuibóu
- Jyutping: Sam1seoi2bou2

General information
- Location: Intersections of Cheung Sha Wan Road × Pei Ho Street/Kweilin Street, Sham Shui Po; Sham Shui Po District; Hong Kong
- Coordinates: 22°19′51″N 114°09′44″E
- System: MTR rapid transit station
- Owner: MTR Corporation
- Operator: MTR Corporation
- Line: Tsuen Wan line
- Platforms: 2 (1 island platform)
- Tracks: 2
- Connections: Bus, minibus

Construction
- Structure type: Underground
- Platform levels: 1
- Accessible: yes

Other information
- Station code: SSP

History
- Opened: 17 May 1982; 44 years ago

Services
Preceding station	MTR	Following station
Prince Edward towards Central	Tsuen Wan line	Cheung Sha Wan towards Tsuen Wan
Track layout
Location
- Location within MTR

Sham Shui Po (Chinese: 深水埗; Cantonese Yale: Sāmséuibóu) is an MTR station located in Sham Shui Po, New Kowloon, Hong Kong. The station is located under Cheung Sha Wan Road between Cheung Sha Wan and Prince Edward stations on the Tsuen Wan line. Sham Shui Po's signature livery is dark green. The station has an island platform which serves two tracks.

== History ==
On 10 May 1982, Tsuen Wan line opened to the public, but Sham Shui Po station did not open until 17 May, a week later. Nishimatsu Construction was the contractor for the station.

== Station layout ==
G	Ground level	Exits
L1	Concourse	Customer Service, MTRShops
L1	Concourse	Vending machine, ATMs
L1	Concourse	Octopus promotion machine
L2; Platforms	Platform 2	Tsuen Wan line towards Central (Prince Edward) →
L2; Platforms	Island platform, doors will open on the right
L2; Platforms	Platform 1	← Tsuen Wan line towards Tsuen Wan (Cheung Sha Wan)

== Entrances and exits ==
These are located within the quadrant bounded by Kweilin Street (NW), Pei Ho Street (SE), Fuk Wa Street (NE) and Apliu Street (SW).
