= Yen Chow Street Hawker Bazaar =

Market in Hong Kong

Yen Chow Street Hawker Bazaar 欽州街小販市場
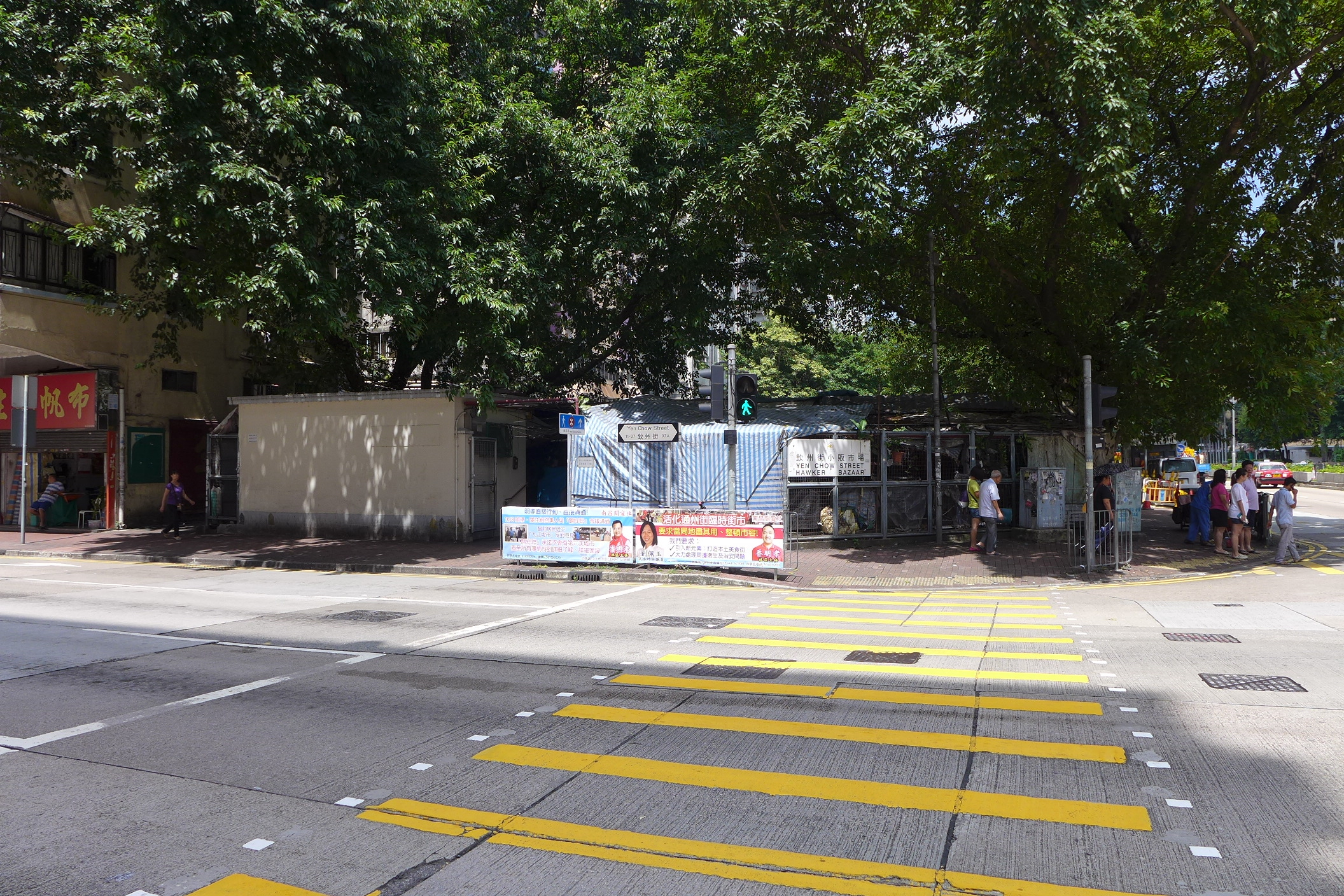
- Yen Chow Street Hawker Bazaar, September 2015
- Location: 373 Lai Chi Kok Road, Sham Shui Po, Kowloon; Hong Kong
- Opening date: 1978
- Management: Food and Environmental Hygiene Department
- Goods sold: Textiles
- Number of tenants: 192
- Interactive map of Yen Chow Street Hawker Bazaar

Yen Chow Street Hawker Bazaar
- Traditional Chinese: 欽州街小販市場
Transcriptions
Yue: Cantonese
- Yale Romanization: Yām jāu gāai síu faan síh chèuhng
- Jyutping: Jam^{1} zau^{1} gaai^{1} siu^{2} faan^{3*2} si^{5} coeng^{4}

Pang Jai
- Traditional Chinese: 棚仔
Transcriptions
Yue: Cantonese
- Yale Romanization: Pàahng zái
- Jyutping: Paang^{4} jai^{2}

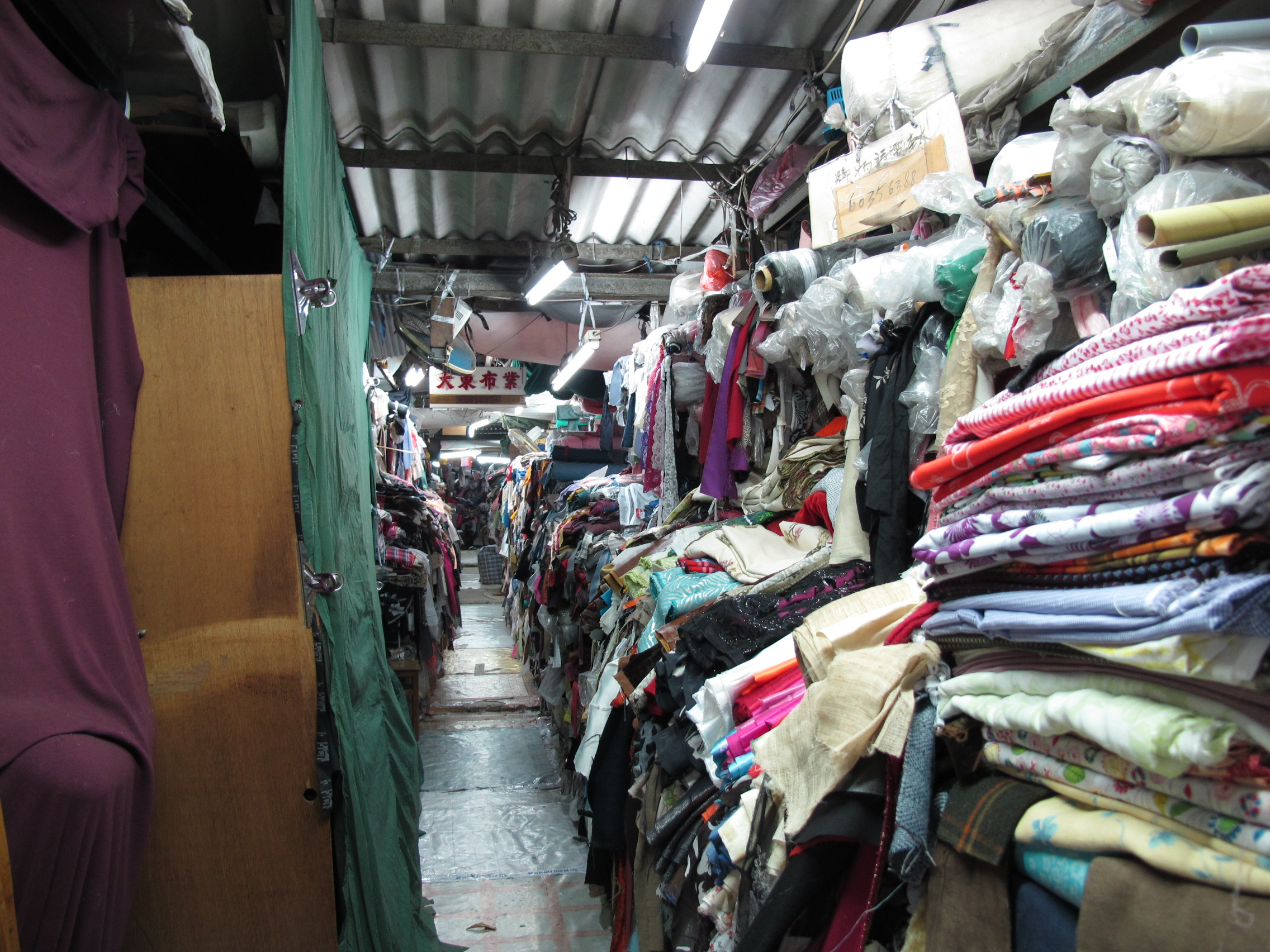
Yen Chow Street Hawker Bazaar 2012

The Yen Chow Street Hawker Bazaar, also known as Pang Jai (棚仔), is a covered market located at the intersection of Yen Chow Street and Lai Chi Kok Road in Sham Shui Po, Hong Kong. The market is known for selling fabrics, textiles, and other fashion-related paraphernalia. The market has been popular with craft enthusiasts, design students, and professionals in the fashion industry for decades.

== History ==
The market was established in 1978, after construction on the Tsuen Wan line for the MTR forced the market to move to its current location on Yen Chow Street. At one point, over 200 sellers were selling their merchandise in the market.

== Closure ==
In 1981, the government decided to repurpose the site for residential use. The issue of the rezoning was discussed by the Sham Shui Po District Council in 2005. In August 2016, the Food and Environmental Hygiene Department issued a notice to the tenants of the market that the government intended to close the site to make way for a public housing development. The government proposed that the current licensed tenants be moved to the Tung Chau Street Temporary Market. Alternatively, the government would buy back the licence from the licence holders for HK$80,000, well below the usual market price of HK$120,000.

On September 28, 2016, the cloth vendor received a letter from the FEHD notifying the arrangement and details of the relocation of the "shack", requesting the cloth vendor to reply in mid-October to accept (a letter of commitment), otherwise the stall will be withdrawn. At the same time, the letter does not recognize the identities of 17 of them as operators (there were 50 operators in the shed at that time), and all relocation and compensation arrangements do not apply to these 17 people. Part of the reason for not recognizing the identity of the operator is that there will only be one registrant for a "husband and wife file". However, among the 33 people who were recognized as operators, some couples were recognized at the same time. The hawker complained to the FEHD. The FEHD required the hawker to provide proof that he was the operator, but there was no public identification criteria. Some hawkers took out electricity bills, sales receipts and other documents, all of which were accused of being unable to prove their identity its identity. The Shed Tsai Concern Group issued a statement saying that the FEHD's identification process lacked objective criteria and was not transparent, and demanded that the FEHD collectively acknowledge it and firmly refused to differentiate.
