= Sham Shui Po Police Station =

Police station in Hong Kong

- 深水埗警署
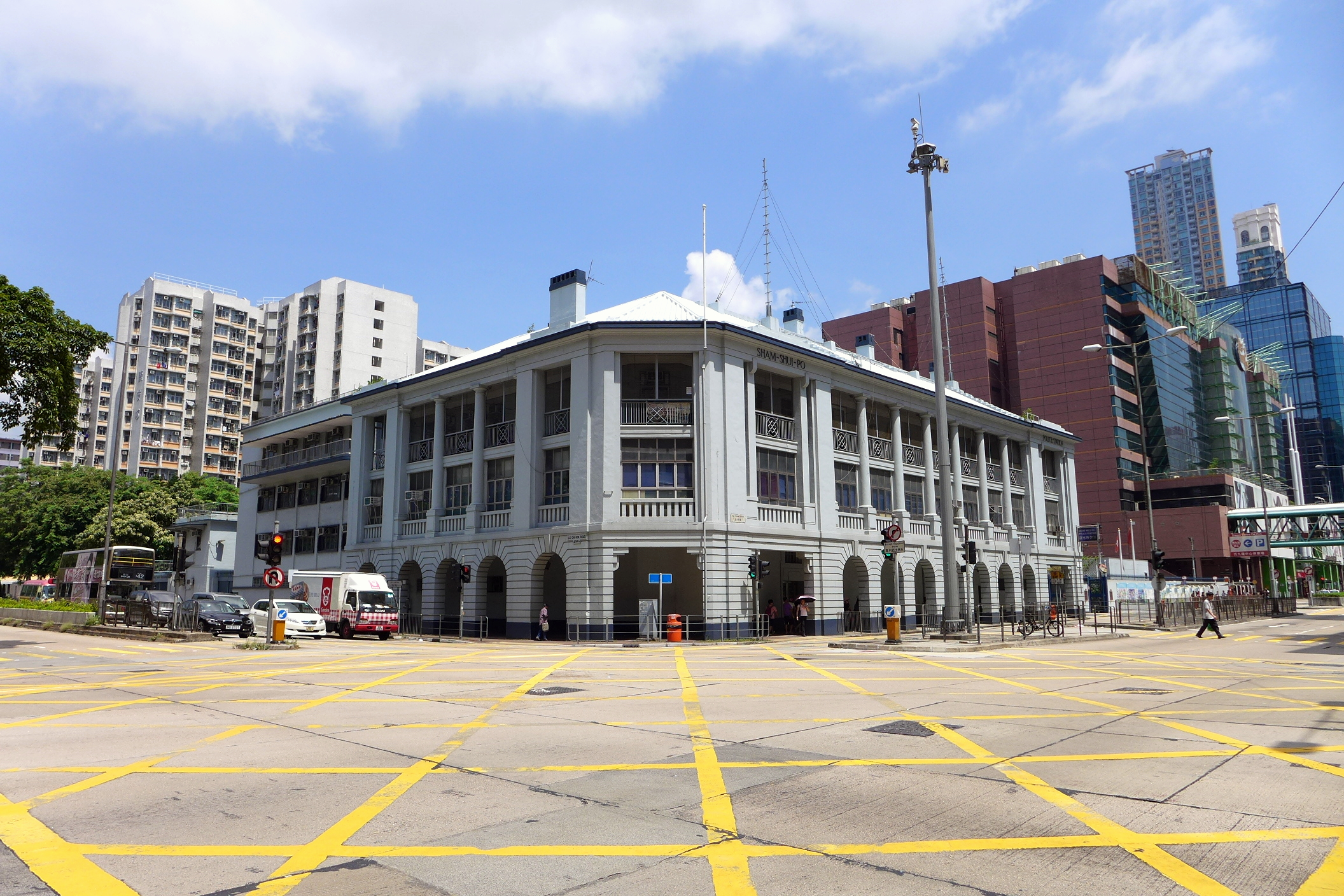
- Sham Shui Po Police Station
- Interactive map of the Sham Shui Po Police Station area

General information
- Type: Police station
- Architectural style: Neo-Classical
- Classification: Grade II historic building
- Location: 37A Yen Chow Street, Sham Shui Po, Kowloon, Hong Kong
- Coordinates: 22.329986°N 114.159088°E
- Current tenants: Hong Kong Police Force
- Completed: 15 June 1925; 101 years ago

Technical details
- Floor count: 3

Design and construction
- Architecture firm: P&T Architects and Engineers

Sham Shui Po Police Station
- Traditional Chinese: 深水埗警署
Transcriptions
Yue: Cantonese
- Yale Romanization: Sām séui bóu gíng chyúh
- Jyutping: Sam^{1} seoi^{2} bou^{2} ging^{2} cyu^{3}

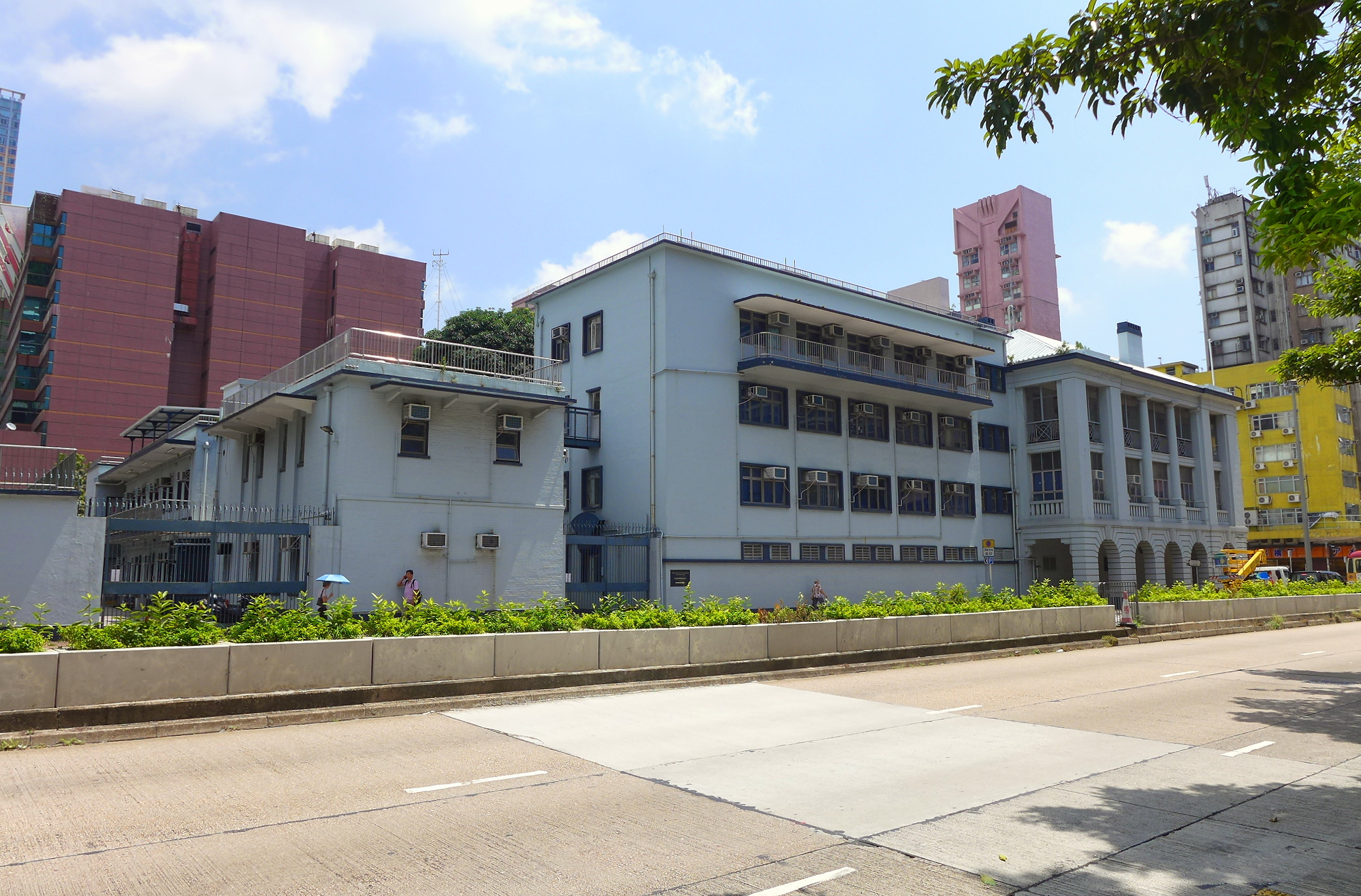
Sham Shui Po Police Station. Lai Chi Kok Road facade

Sham Shui Po Police Station is situated at the junction of Lai Chi Kok Road and Yen Chow Street, Sham Shui Po, in Kowloon, Hong Kong. It was built in 1924 with three storeys. It is graded as Grade III historic building.

The police station is adjacent to the former Sham Shui Po British Army and POW Camp, and later Dragon Centre.

== History ==
Shortly after the British executed the 99-year lease of the New Territory, a police station, also served as the Harbour Master’s Station, was built at Sham Shui Po. The British established a base at Sham Shui Po with military camps and police stations as it overlooked the western side of the Victoria Harbour. The current Sham Shui Po Police Station building was completed in 1924 to replace the older station at the area.

The building was built before World War II for a small population, before the rapid industrial and residential development of the area after the war. In addition, a large influx of immigrants from mainland China, settling in the area after the war, caused the district to become one of the worst squatter areas in Hong Kong. Therefore, the station underwent a series of additions and alterations to cater for its growing need for personnel and facilities.

Sham Shui Po Station is still serving its community today even though its role changed from the station for the whole district to a sub-station in 1967.

== See also ==
- Historic police station buildings in Hong Kong
