= Kee Wah Bakery =

Bakeries of Hong Kong

- Native name: 奇華餅家公司
- Industry: Chinese Bakery
- Founder: Wong Yip Wing
- Number of locations: Hong Kong, Chinese Mainland (Shenzhen, Guangzhou, Shanghai), Taiwan, Los Angeles and San Francisco
- Products: traditional Chinese pastries and delicacies, Chinese Bridal Cakes and mooncakes.
- Website: http://en.keewah.com/

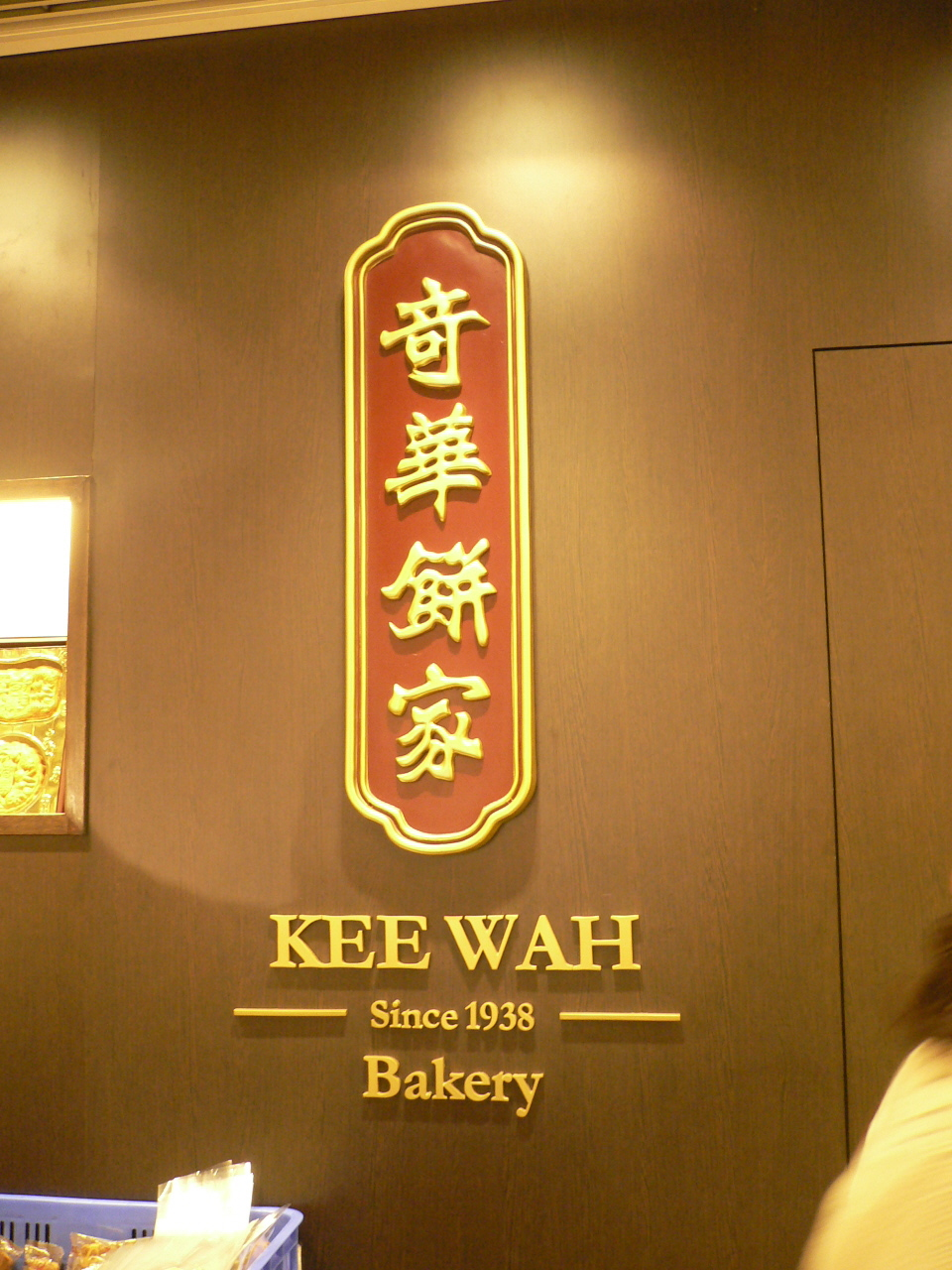
Kee Wah Bakery's 1938 original logo

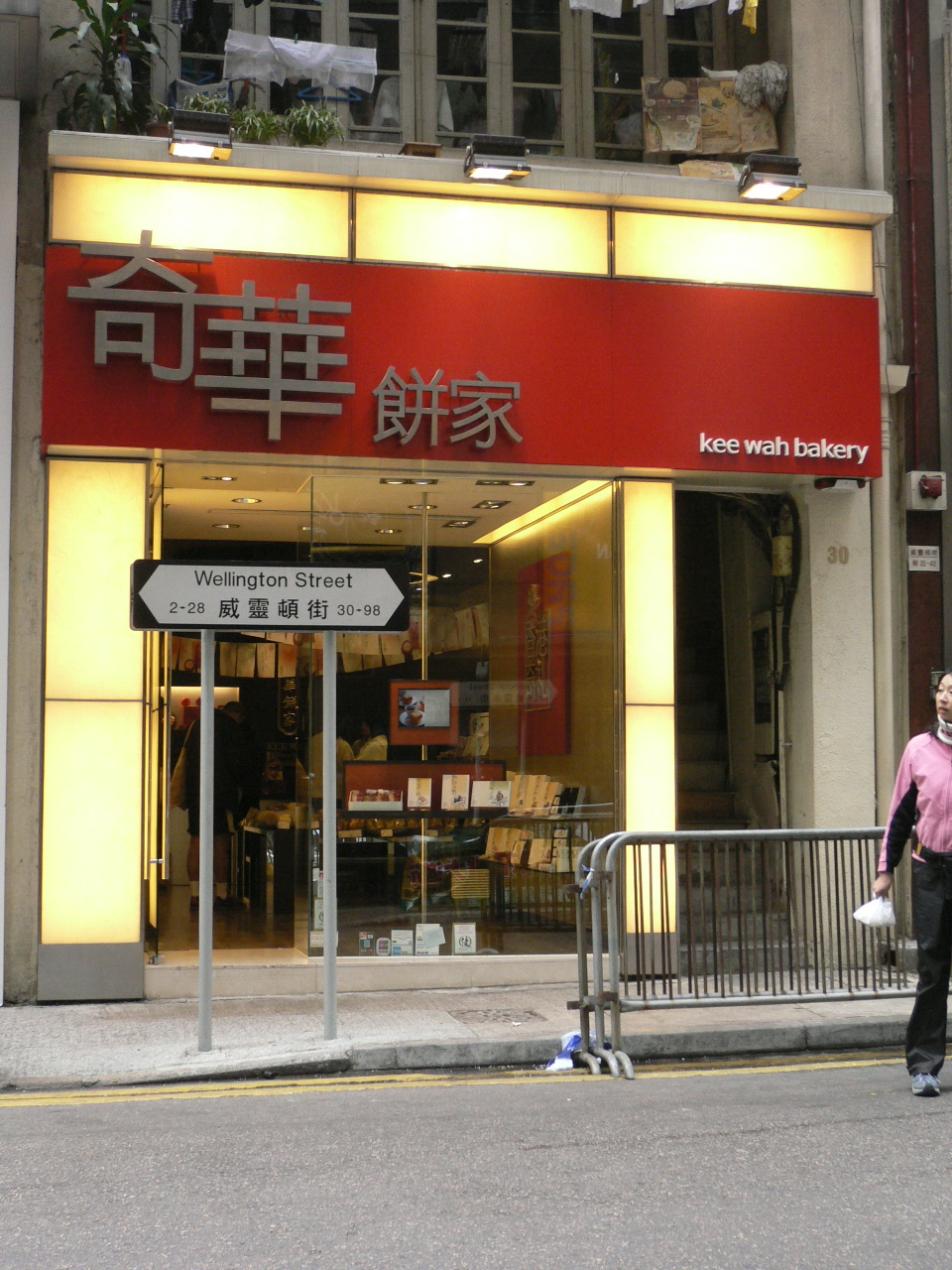
Kee Wah on Wellington Street, Hong Kong

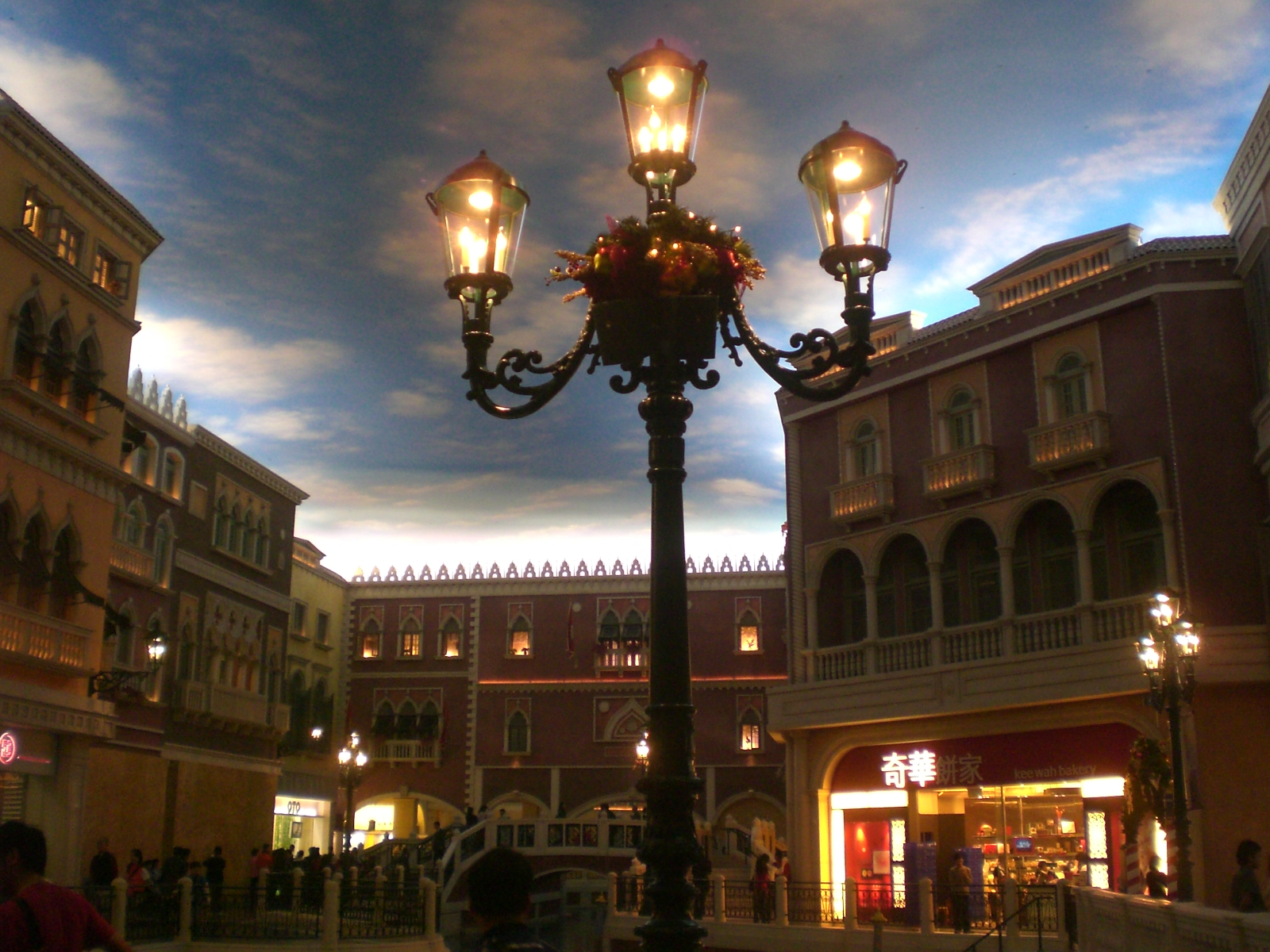
A Kee Wah store in the Venetian Macao.

Kee Wah Bakery (Chinese: 奇華餅家公司) is a chain of bakery stores in Hong Kong, mainland China (Shenzhen, Guangzhou, Shanghai), Taiwan, and Los Angeles and San Francisco.

== History ==
Kee Wah Bakery was founded by Mr. Wong Yip Wing in 1938 as a small grocery store in a corner of Shanghai Street in Kowloon, Hong Kong. A few years later World War II began and the store was forced to close. At that time one of the employees used some simple tools and an old oil barrel as an improvised oven, and began baking pastries to sell to the boat dwellers on the harbour. This marked the beginning of Kee Wah Bakery. Since then, Kee Wah has become one of Hong Kong's oldest bakeries, and has made its name in Chinese Wedding Cakes and Mooncakes. In 1997 the baton of the business were passed to the second generation; Mr Kevin S Wong revamped the company's branding and product packaging by engaging renowned graphic designer Mr Suen Siu Wah to overhaul the corporate identity, product packaging, outlet interiors and staff uniforms. Headquarter is located at Kee Wah Industrial Building, 666 Castle Peak Road, Cheung Sha Wan, with production lines; There is also a production centre in Taipo Industrial Estate which started in 2009.

Hong Kong actor Eric Tsang is the endorser for Kee Wah Mooncake and Kee Gift Series. Taiwanese actress Annie Liu is the endorser for Kee Wah Chinese Bridal Cakes.

The Kee Wah Bakery in California was established in 1985 and continues to produce freshly baked goods daily. Many well known favorites are the egg tarts and the pineapple buns.

== Collaboration ==
In 2008, Hong Kong lifestyle retail store G.O.D. collaborated with Kee Wah Bakery to design mooncakes for the Chinese Mid-Autumn Festival. G.O.D. came up with presenting the traditional treats in the shape of bottoms in eight different designs, but still filled with traditional white lotus seed paste and salted yolks.

In 2012, Kee Wah opened its first nostalgia-themed store in Hong Kong in Ocean Park's “Old Hong Kong” attraction. Based on Kee Wah's flagship store in Shanghai during the 40s, the décor and ambience of the store aims to offer visitors a chance to reminiscence the past while tasting fresh baked traditional pastries and snacks. A series of co-branded products are launched which are available for sale not only inside the Park but also in other Kee Wah outlets in Hong Kong.
