= Sham Shui Po =

Area of Kowloon, Hong Kong

- Chinese: 深水埗
- Cantonese Yale: Sāmséuibóu
- Literal meaning: "deep water pier"
Transcriptions
Standard Mandarin
- Hanyu Pinyin: Shēnshuǐbù
Yue: Cantonese
- Yale Romanization: Sāmséuibóu
- Jyutping: Sam1seoi2bou2
- IPA: [sɐ́m.sɵ̌y̯.pǒu̯]

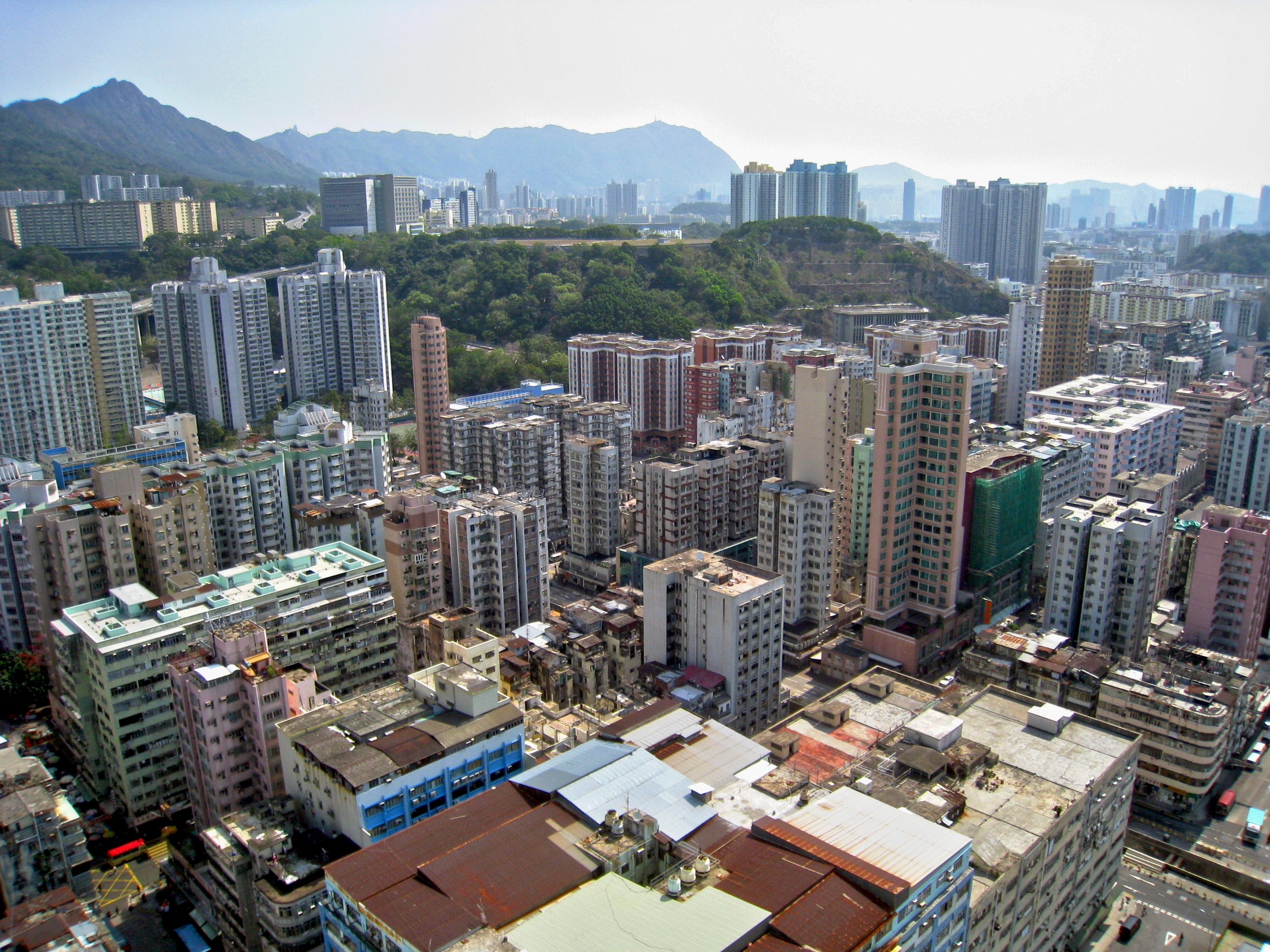

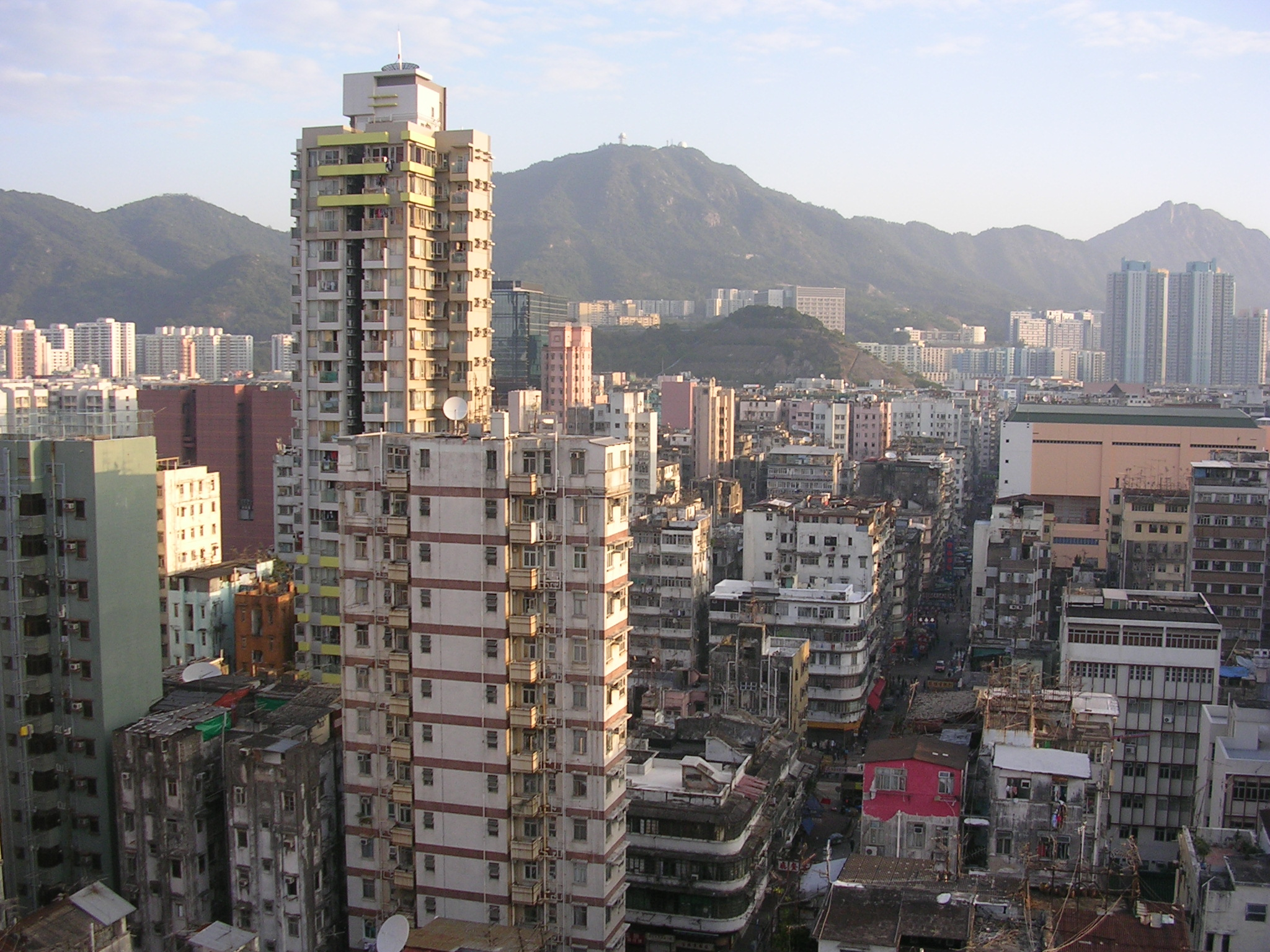
Views of Sham Shui Po

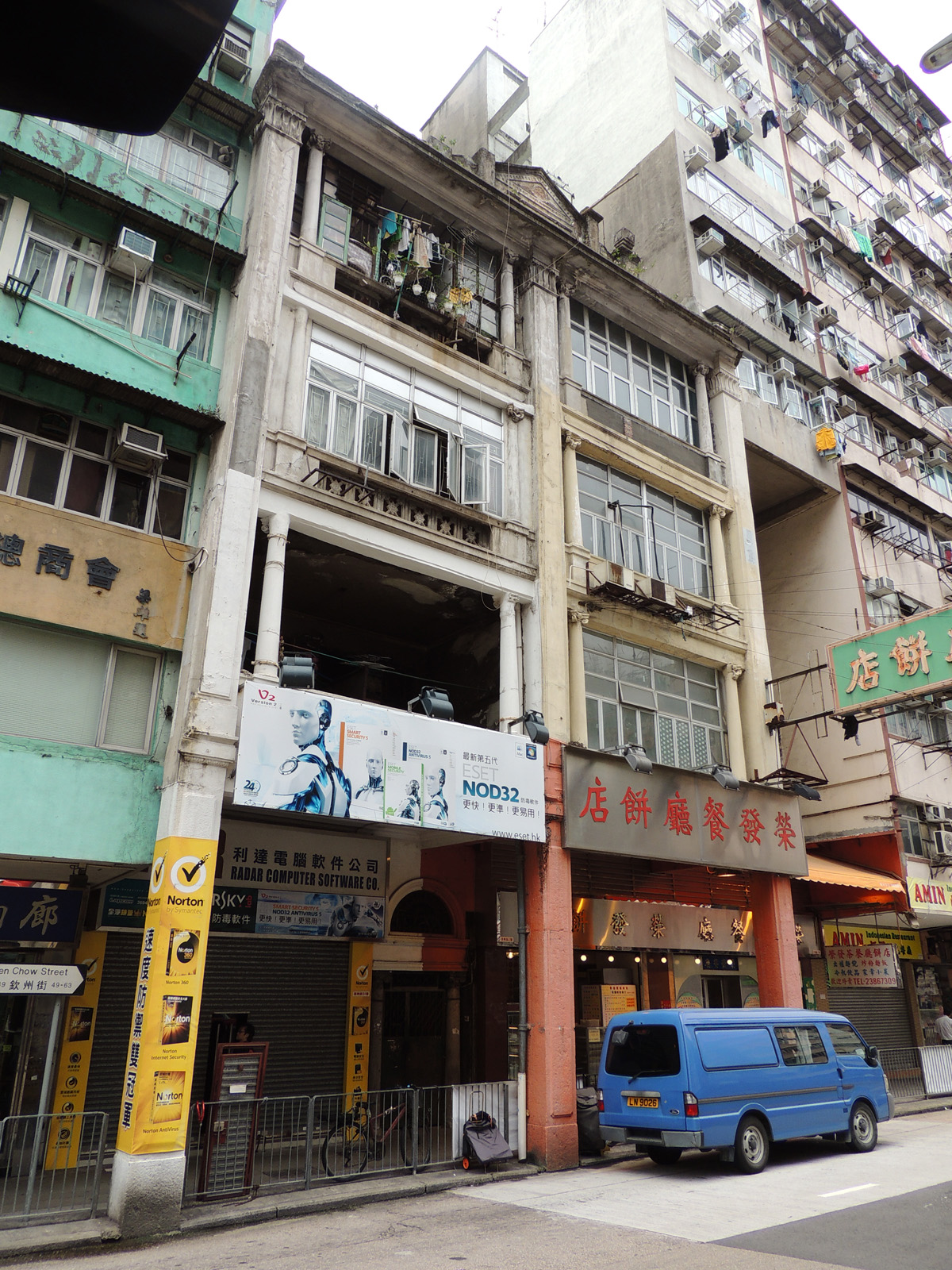
A 1930s Tong Lau in Shum Shui Po

Sham Shui Po (Chinese: 深水埗) is an area of Kowloon, Hong Kong, situated in the northwestern part of the Kowloon Peninsula, north of Tai Kok Tsui, east of Cheung Sha Wan and south of Shek Kip Mei (石硤尾). It is located in and is the namesake of the Sham Shui Po District.

A predominantly lower-income neighborhood, Sham Shui Po is one of the densest and most vibrant neighbourhoods in Hong Kong. It has a diverse mix of migrants from rural China, working-class families and seniors, with many living in cage homes, subdivided flats and public housing estates. Sham Shui Po has many lively street markets, electronics outlets, fabric stores, restaurants and food vendors. It is famous for its Golden Computer Shopping Arcade for bargain electronics and accessories.

== History ==
The discovery in 1955 of the Lei Cheng Uk Han Tomb indicates that as early as 2,000 years ago, there were Chinese people settled in what is now Sham Shui Po. Sham Shui Po means "Deep Water Pier" in Cantonese. At the time, the water in Sham Shui Po was deeper than the beach of Cheung Sha Wan to the northwest. It is close to the former peninsula of Tai Kok Tsui, the low ridge of which ends in Sham Shui Po.

At the time of the 1911 census, the population of Sham Shui Po was 1,577. The number of males was 1,028.

In the first stage, the town of Sham Shui Po was bounded by Yen Chow Street, Tung Chau Street, Wong Chuk Street, and Apliu Street. Part of the town was on reclamation land. The town was surrounded by the villages of Un Chau, Tin Liu, and Tong Mei. A nullah along Nam Cheong Street was constructed to drain the water of rivers to the north and east (which explains the street's wideness). The town was closed to Cosmopolitan Dock on the outer shore of Tai Kok Tsui.

Under Japanese occupation, a prisoner of war camp was maintained here for most of the duration of the Second World War. An account of life by a British POW has been published as The Hard Way: Surviving Shamshuipo POW Camp 1941–45 by Victor Stanley Ebbage (Spellmount, 2011).

== Land use ==
As Sham Shui Po was one of the earliest developed areas in Hong Kong, it was once a commercial, industrial and transportation hub of the territory. As of 2003, Sham Shui Po is covered mainly by residential buildings, with public housing estates built on approximately 810,000 square metres (8,700,000 sq ft) of land. Factories and warehouses are still concentrated mainly in Cheung Sha Wan.

It is connected to the MTR rail network via the Sham Shui Po station on the Tsuen Wan line.

== Cityscape ==
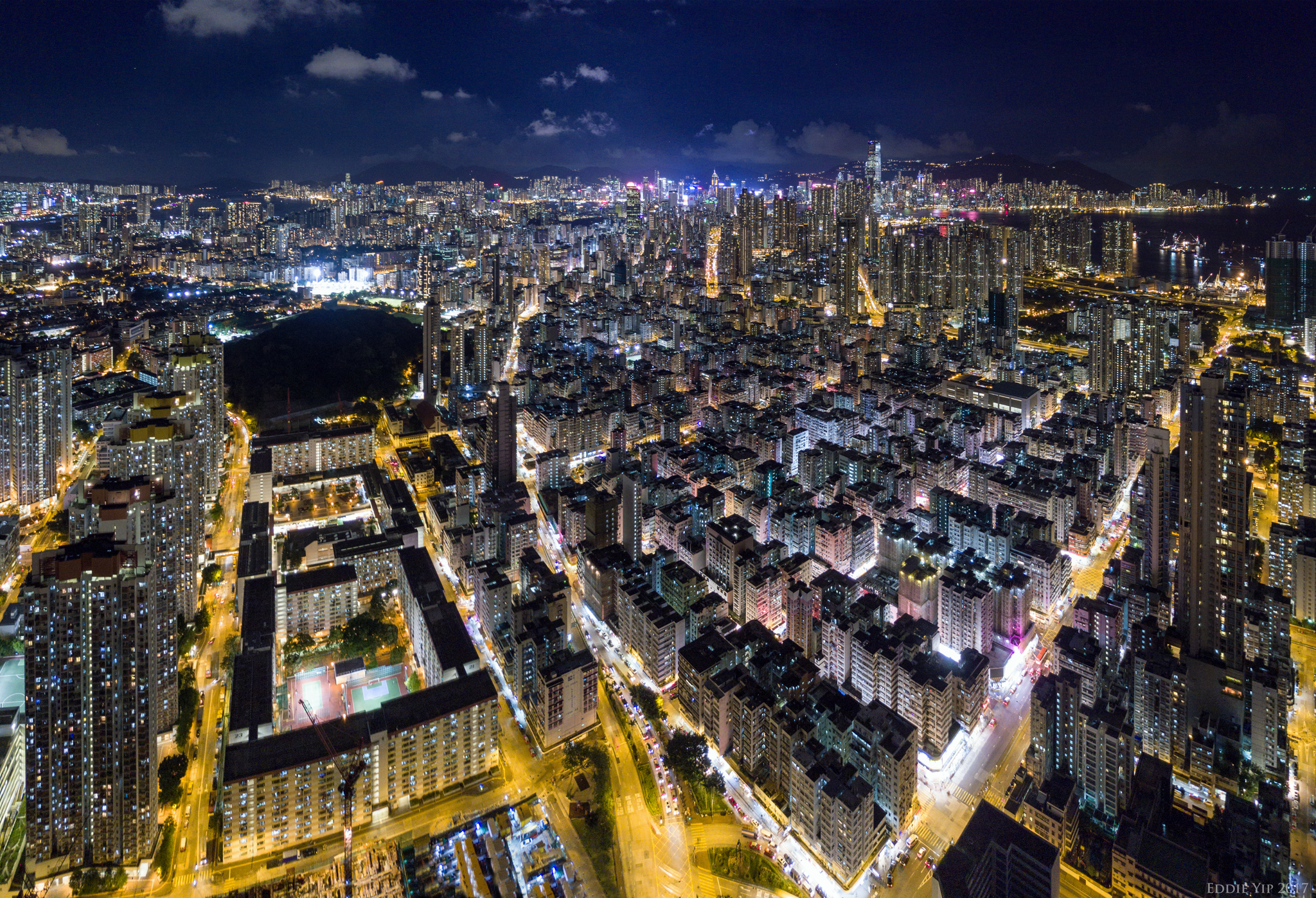
Aerial view of Sham Shui Po at night (2017)

== Urban renewal ==
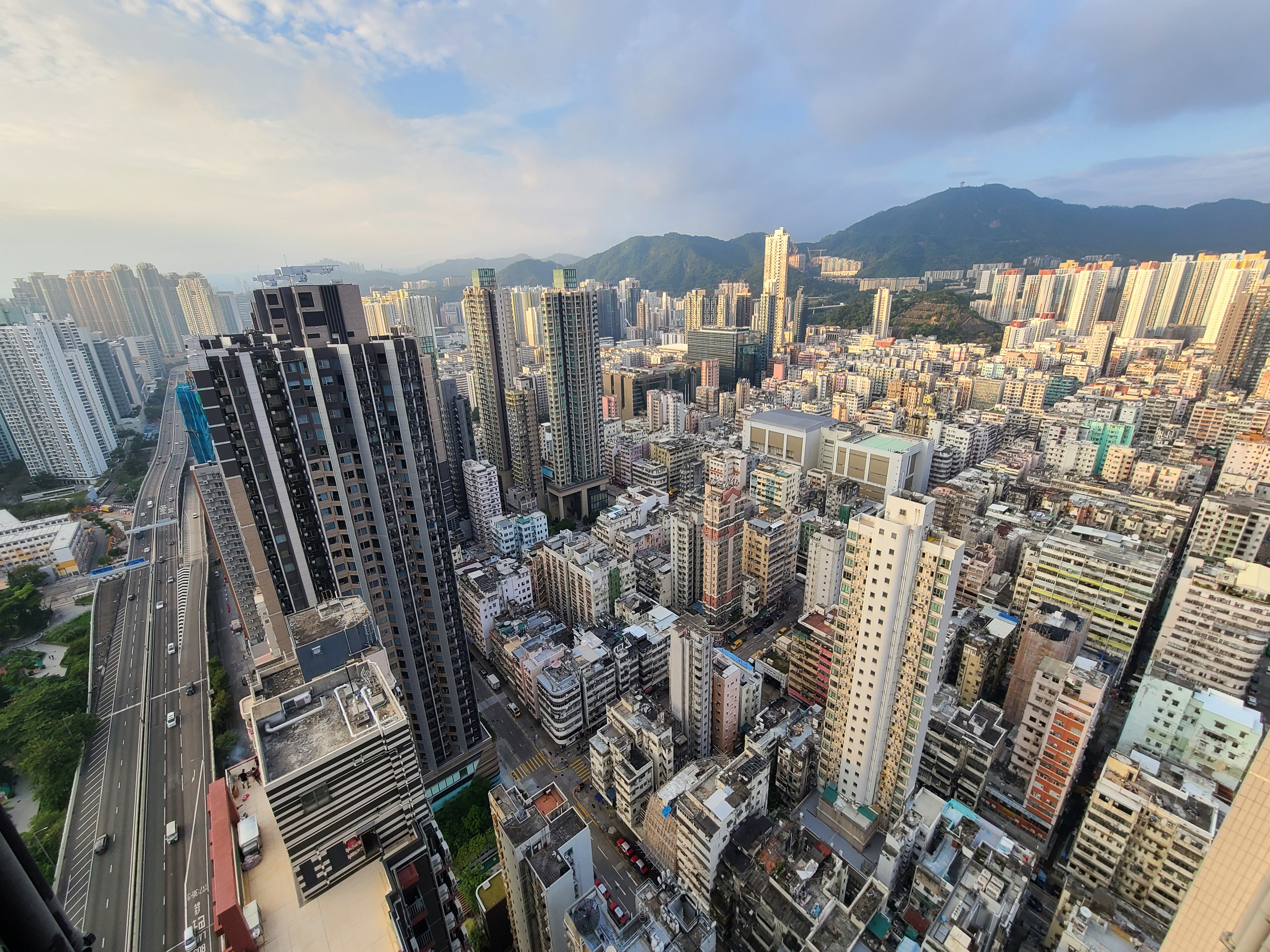
Overlook of Sham Shui Po from Nam Cheong Street

Sham Shui Po is an area where urban decay is serious in Hong Kong, so the government is carrying out urban renewal projects.

In July 2003 the Hong Kong Housing Society (HKHS) announced that its first urban renewal project would be to improve the living environment at Po On Road/Wai Wai Road in Sham Shui Po. Covering an area of 2,436 square metres (26,220 sq ft) and affecting approximately 500 households, this project will provide 330 residential flats and some retail units. Government, institutional, and community facilities will also be erected for the community. This development will require the HKHS to acquire about 157 properties, costing an estimated HK$240 million. The total development cost of the project is about HK$720 million. To promote creative tourism in old Hong Kong districts of Wan Chai and Sham Shui Po Hong Kong Design Centre unveiled a budget of HK$60 million.

== Shopping ==
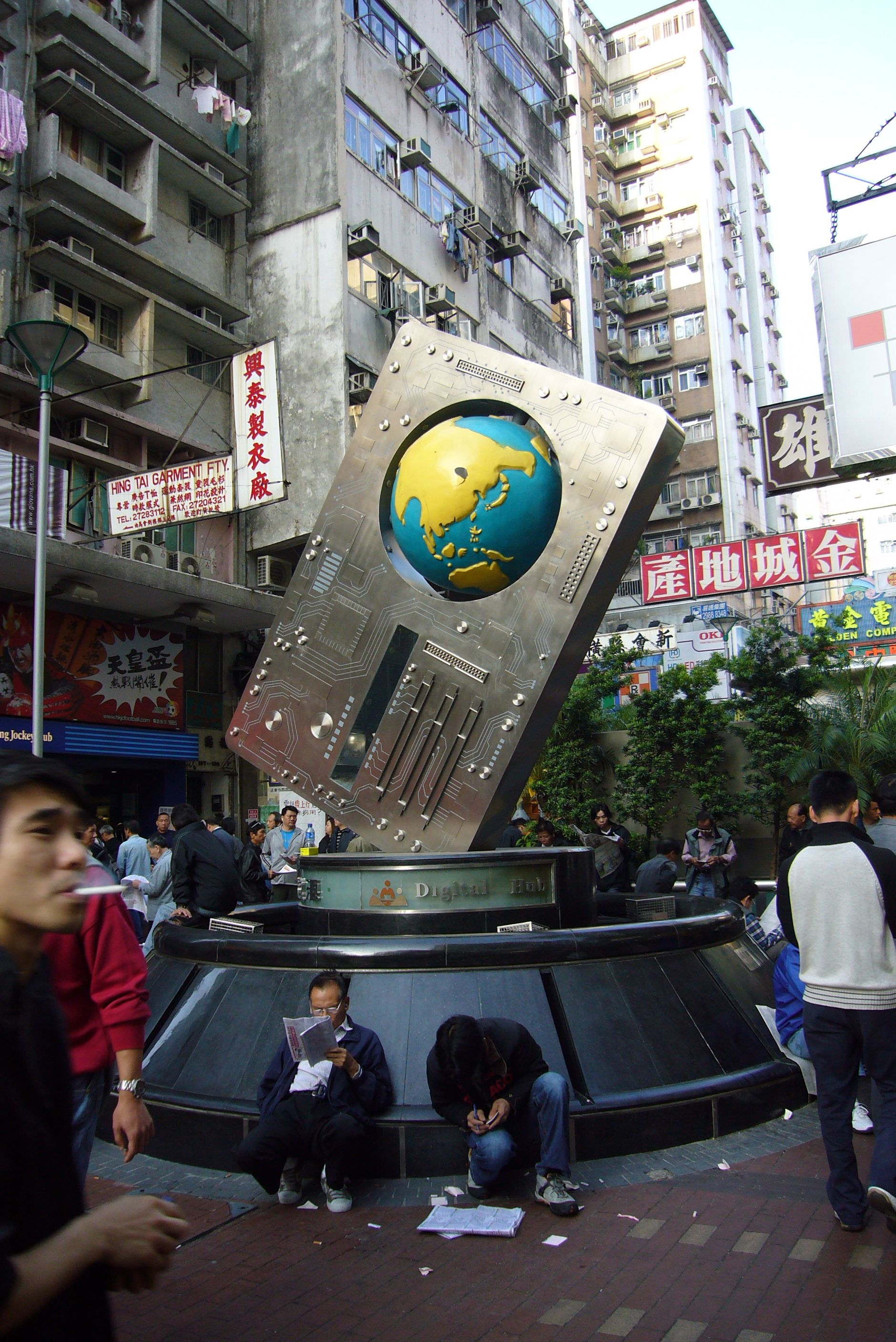
The Digital Hub Logo at Sham Shui Po

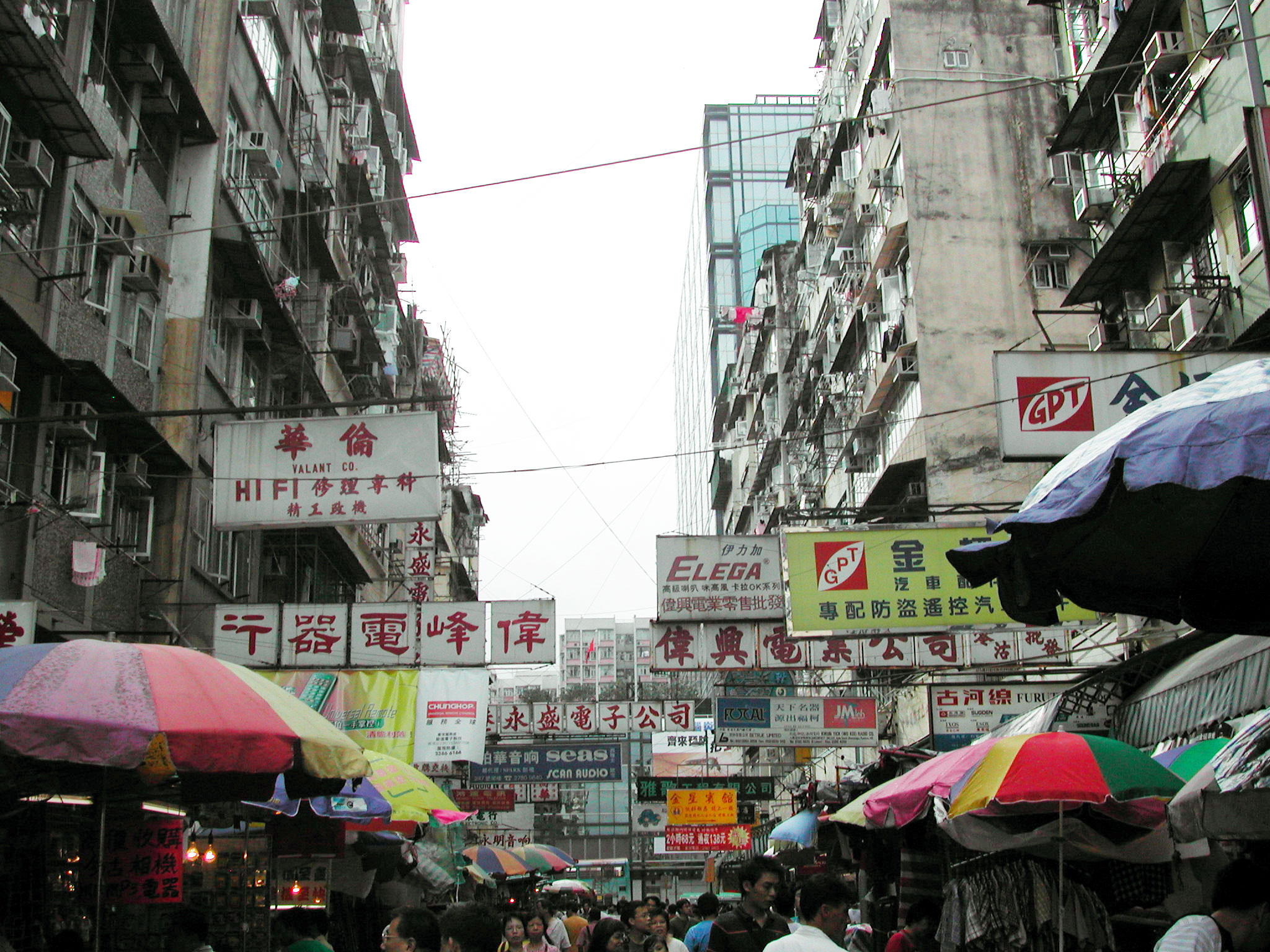
Colourful parasols cropped up along the busy Apliu Street

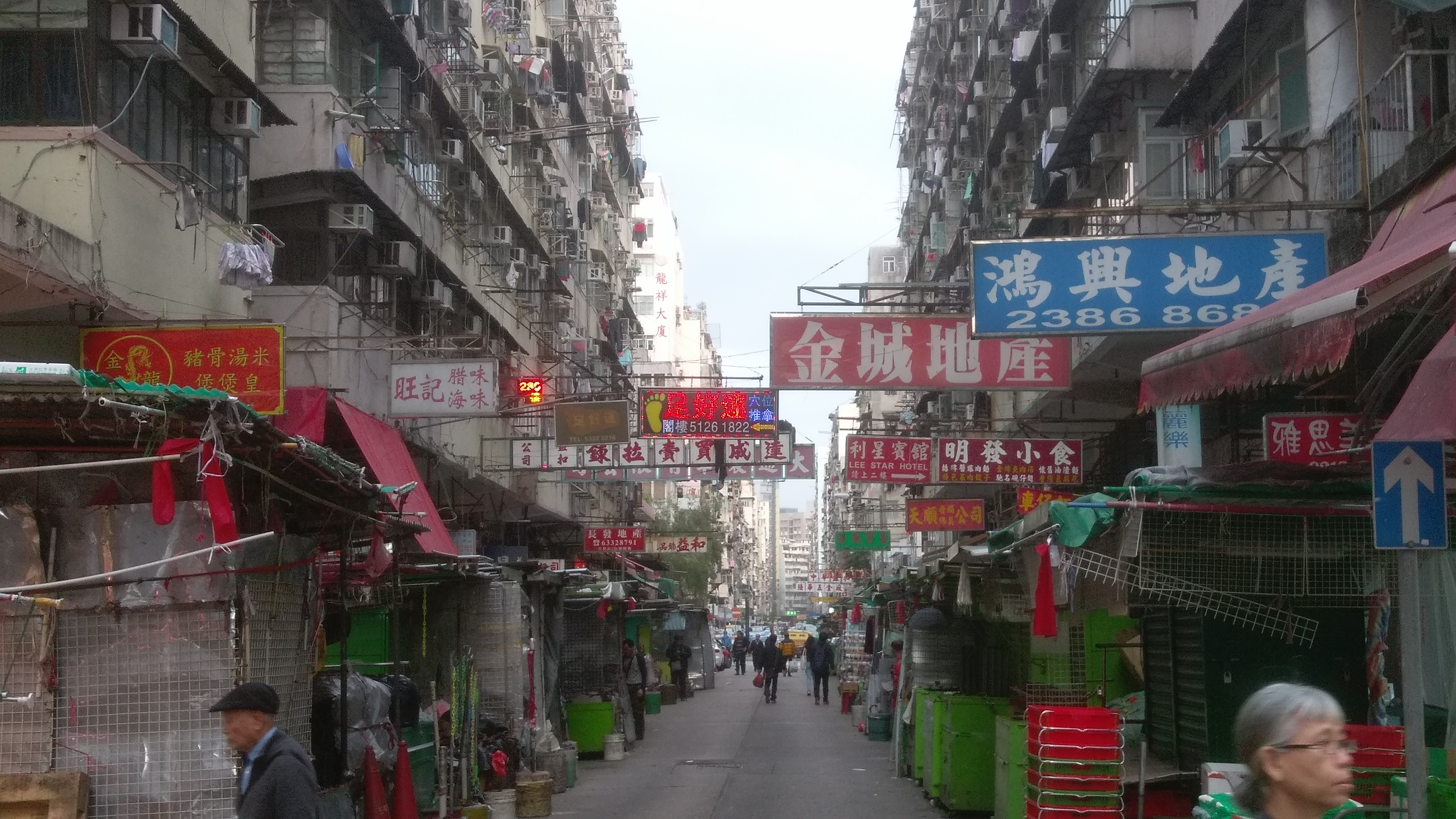
A market in Ki Lung Street

The street market in Sham Shui Po is a hotspot for both locals and tourists.

The Apliu Street market is well known in Hong Kong for its electronics. The vendors in this open-air street market sell a wide variety of products at reasonable prices, allowing individuals to trade second-hand goods here. Different shops sell a variety of goods including industrial electronics, analogue and digital radio communications equipment, disco effects equipment, crockery, 1940s-era radios, LPs, torches, and audiophile hi-fi amplifiers in various stages of repair. The Hong Kong government promotes Apliu Street as Hong Kong's answer to Akihabara (in Japan).

Golden Computer Centre is one of the major malls selling computer-related equipment (see next section).

The annual Hong Kong computer fair held in the streets of Sham Shui Po attracts a large crowd.

The market on Ki Lung Street is also famous for its fresh food and cheap prices. In the early 1990s, the Hong Kong government rebuilt the market and also added air conditioning.

There are numerous fashionwear wholesalers along Cheung Sha Wan Road. On weekends, some shops allow retail purchases, offering quality clothes at very affordable prices.

Nam Cheong Street and Ki Lung Street are most famous for their fabric stores, containing cloth, sash, ribbons and buttons.

=== Golden Shopping Centre ===
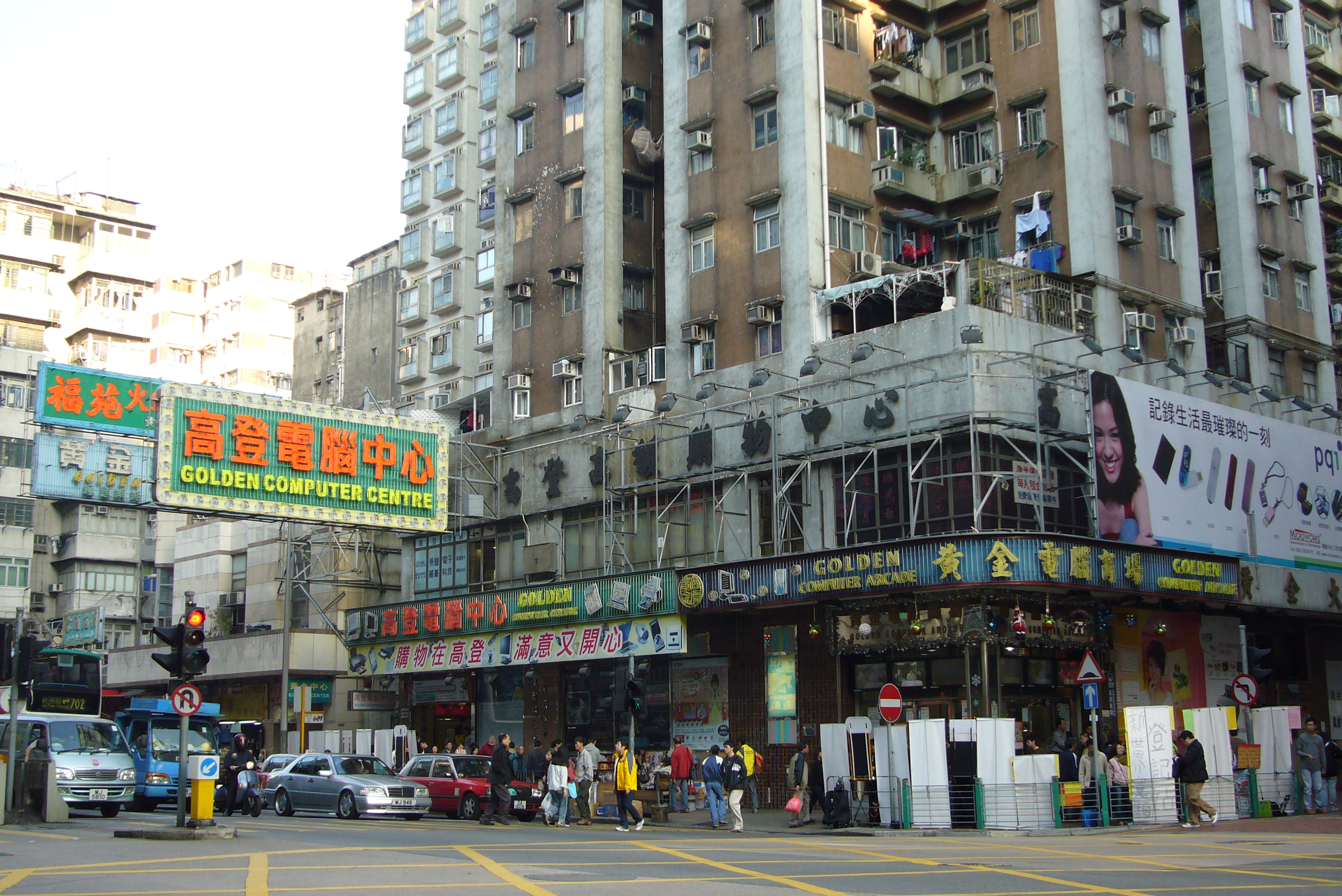
Golden Shopping Centre at the corner of Fuk Wa Street and Yen Chow Street

Once infamous for counterfeit software but today considered one of the cheapest places in Hong Kong to purchase a personal computer, the Golden Shopping Centre is a prominent IT shopping centre. Products range from complete systems, cell phones, to various peripherals. Unlike purely consumer-oriented IT shopping centres, Golden features several stores specializing in professional and esoteric network equipment.

The Golden Shopping Centre is also known for the number of video game stores it contains, where people purchase gaming systems, software and accessories at either a slightly discounted price, or in special in-store packages which might include an extra game or extra accessories. Since the halls are extremely narrow, it is often very congested, especially on weekends. The mall has three floors. The 1st floor, Golden Computer Centre (高登電腦中心), mainly sells games and gaming software, while the (upper) ground floor and lower ground floor, Golden Computer Arcade (黃金電腦商場), focuses on the sales of computer-oriented hardware. They were originally fashion markets named "Golden Shopping Centre" and "Golden Shopping Arcade" respectively.

==== Influence on Hong Kong's Internet culture ====
In the late 1990s, when the Internet started becoming popular, the shop owners of the Golden Computer Centre launched a website to post the prices of computer hardware and software. Later, a forum known as HKGolden was set up on the website, which later became one of the largest Internet forums in Hong Kong.

=== Dragon Centre ===
Dragon Centre is a nine-storey shopping centre. It was the largest shopping centre in West Kowloon until Elements opened its doors above the Kowloon MTR station.

== Local delicacies ==
As Sham Shui Po is usually regarded as one of the poorest and oldest districts in Hong Kong, it is well known for people to find cheap and local food in Sham Shui Po. A lot of local restaurants are located in Fuk Wa Street, Fuk Wing Street, Pei Ho Street and Kweilin Street. Some of the famous restaurants include Kung Wo Beancurd Factory, Wai Kee Noodle Cafe, Man Kee Cart Noodle and Kwan Kee Store, which are highly praised for their soy milk and pudding, pork liver noodles, cart noodles and traditional puddings respectively.

== Streets ==
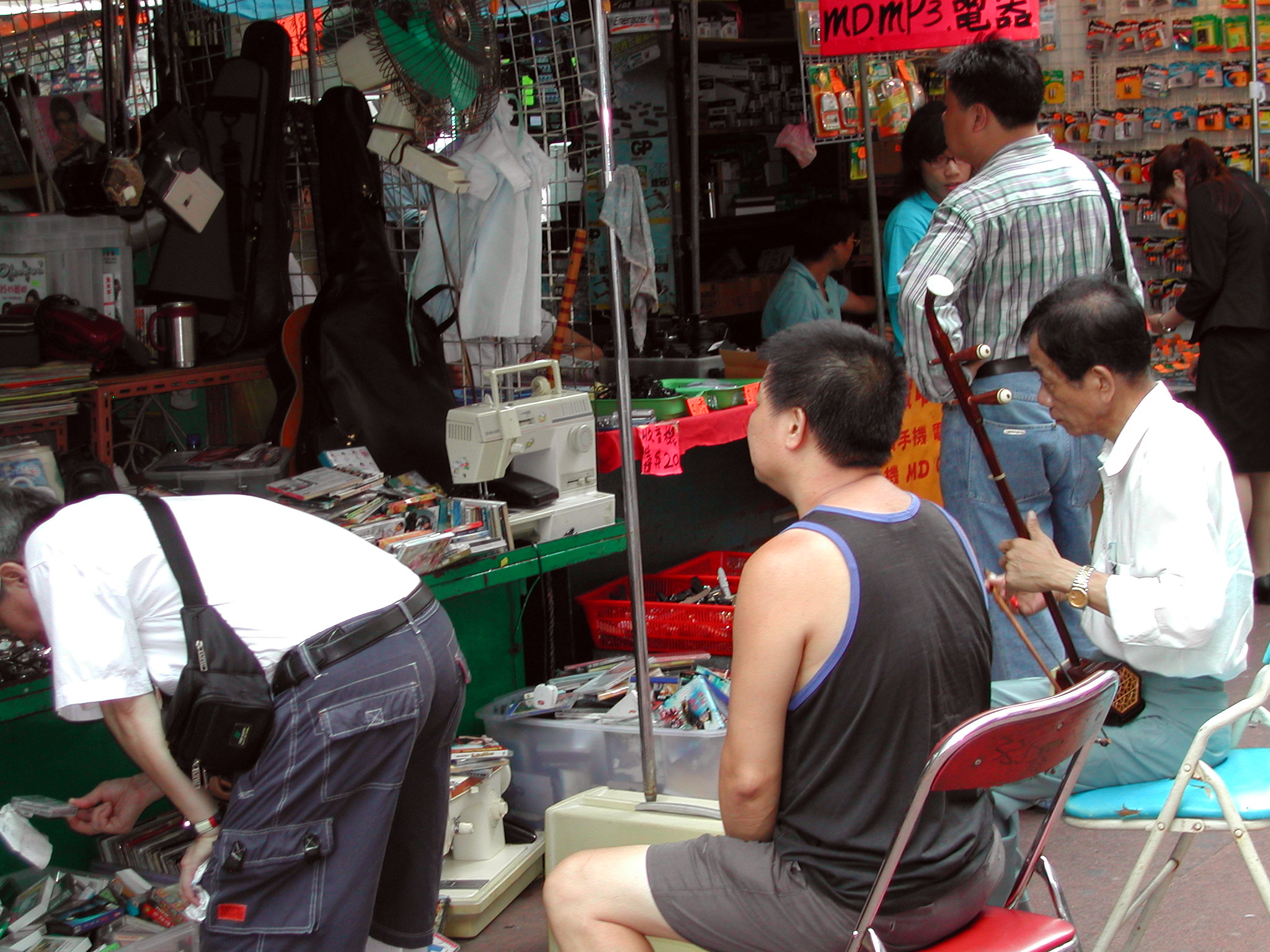
Erhu performance is a popular pastime for the district dwellers.

Streets and roads in Sham Shui Po include:

- Apliu Street (鴨寮街)
- Boundary Street (界限街)
- Castle Peak Road (青山道)
- Cheung Sha Wan Road (長沙灣道)
- Fuk Wa Street – street market with numerous stalls selling varieties of goods like old books and clothes. It spans from Castle Peak Road to Tai Po Road. Unlike the names of streets nearby, it does not follow the place names in China. Its name means blessing (fuk, 福) and prosperous (wa, 華).
- Fuk Wing Street – Toy Street in Hong Kong. Unlike the names of streets nearby, it does not follow the place names in China. Its name means blessing and glorious.
- Ki Lung Street (基隆街)
- Lai Chi Kok Road (荔枝角道)
- Nam Cheong Street (南昌街)
- Pei Ho Street
- Tai Po Road
- Tonkin Street
- Yen Chow Street
- Un Chau Street

== Historic buildings ==
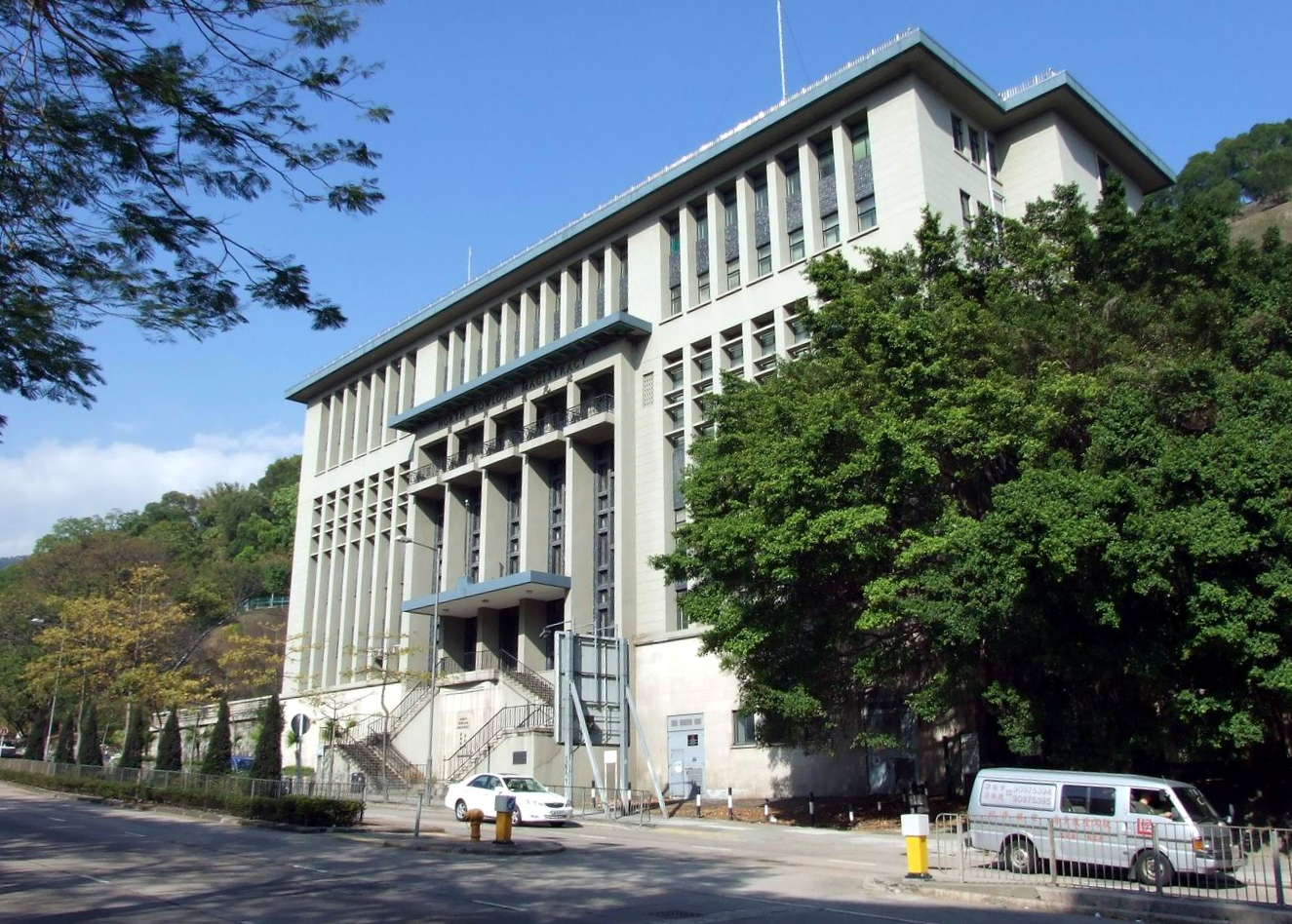
North Kowloon Magistracy

- Lei Cheng Uk Han Tomb
- Lui Seng Chun
- North Kowloon Magistracy. In 2008, the building was part of the seven buildings of Batch I of the Hong Kong Government's Revitalising Historic Buildings Through Partnership Scheme seeking adaptive reuse of government-owned historic buildings. This building was used by the Savannah College of Art and Design (SCAD) as its Hong Kong campus from 2010 until 2020.
- Sam Tai Tsz Temple and Pak Tai Temple Complex
- Sham Shui Po Police Station
- Ex-Sham Shui Po Service Reservoir

== Education ==
The district is home to several prestigious schools, including

- San Wui Commercial Society YMCA of Hong Kong Christian School
- St. Francis of Assisi's English Primary School
- St. Margaret's Co-educational English Secondary and Primary School
- Tsung Tsin Primary School And Kindergarten, among others.

Sham Shui Po is in Primary One Admission (POA) School Net 40. Within the school net are multiple aided schools (operated independently but funded with government money) and two government schools: Fuk Wing Street Government Primary School and Li Cheng Uk Government Primary School.

Hong Kong Public Libraries maintains the Sham Shui Po Public Library in the Sham Shui Po Leisure and Cultural Building, as well as the Po On Road Public Library in the Po On Road Municipal Services Building.

== Other facilities ==
- Lei Cheng Uk Swimming Pool
- Precious Blood Hospital (Caritas)
- Nam Cheong Park
- Sham Shui Po Park
- Sham Shui Po Park Swimming Pool
- Shek Kip Mei Park
- Tung Chau Street Park
- Public housing estates in Sham Shui Po
- Yen Chow Street Hawker Bazaar

== Notable people ==
Ladies World Snooker champion Ng On-yee grew up in the area, and learned the game at her father's snooker hall there.

== See also ==
- List of buildings, sites and areas in Hong Kong
- Sham Shui Po Barracks
