= Fuk Wa Street =

Street in Sham Shui Po, Hong Kong

Coordinates: 22.33081°N 114.16327°E

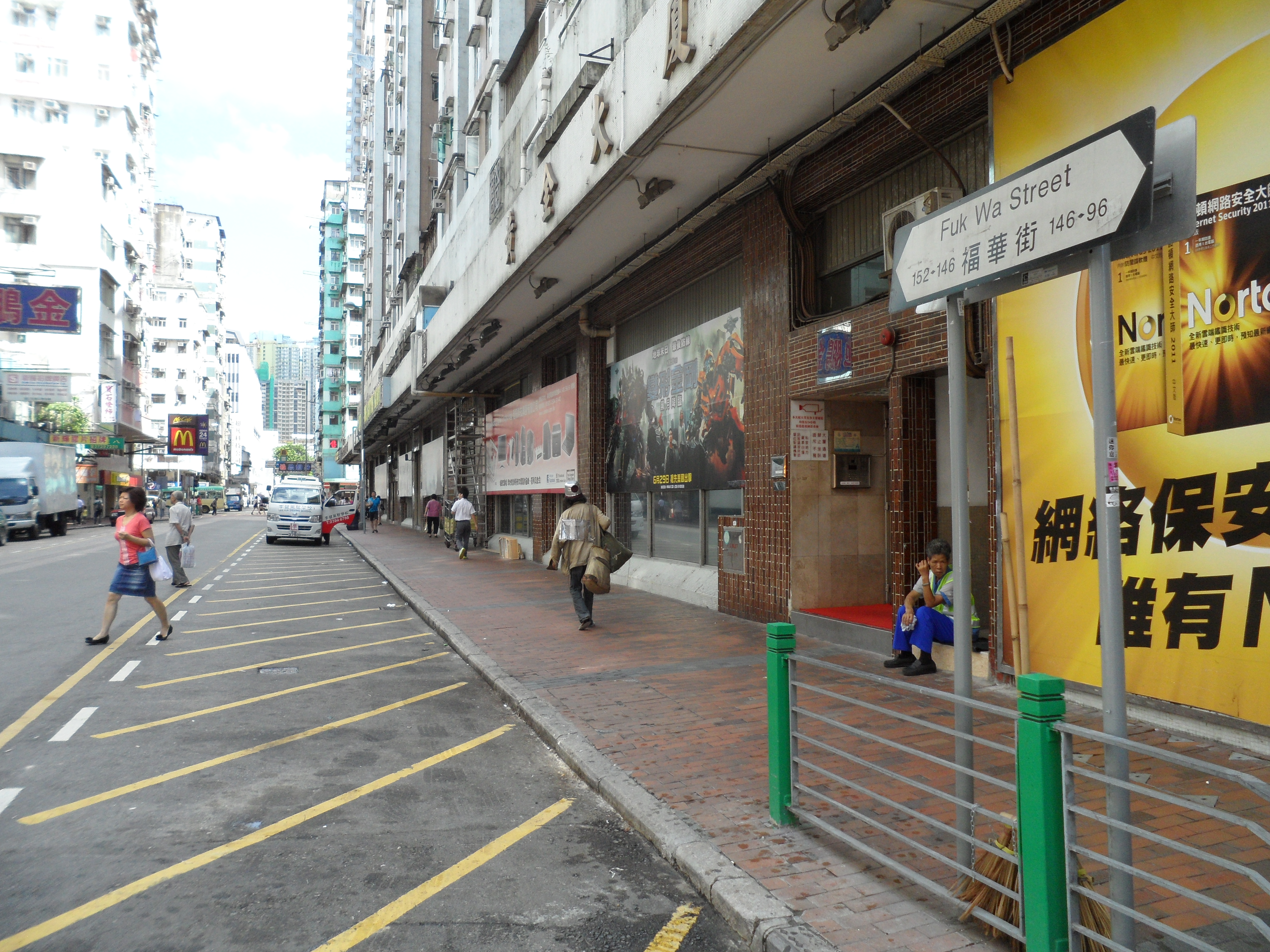
Roadsign of Fuk Wa Street in front of Golden Computer Arcade

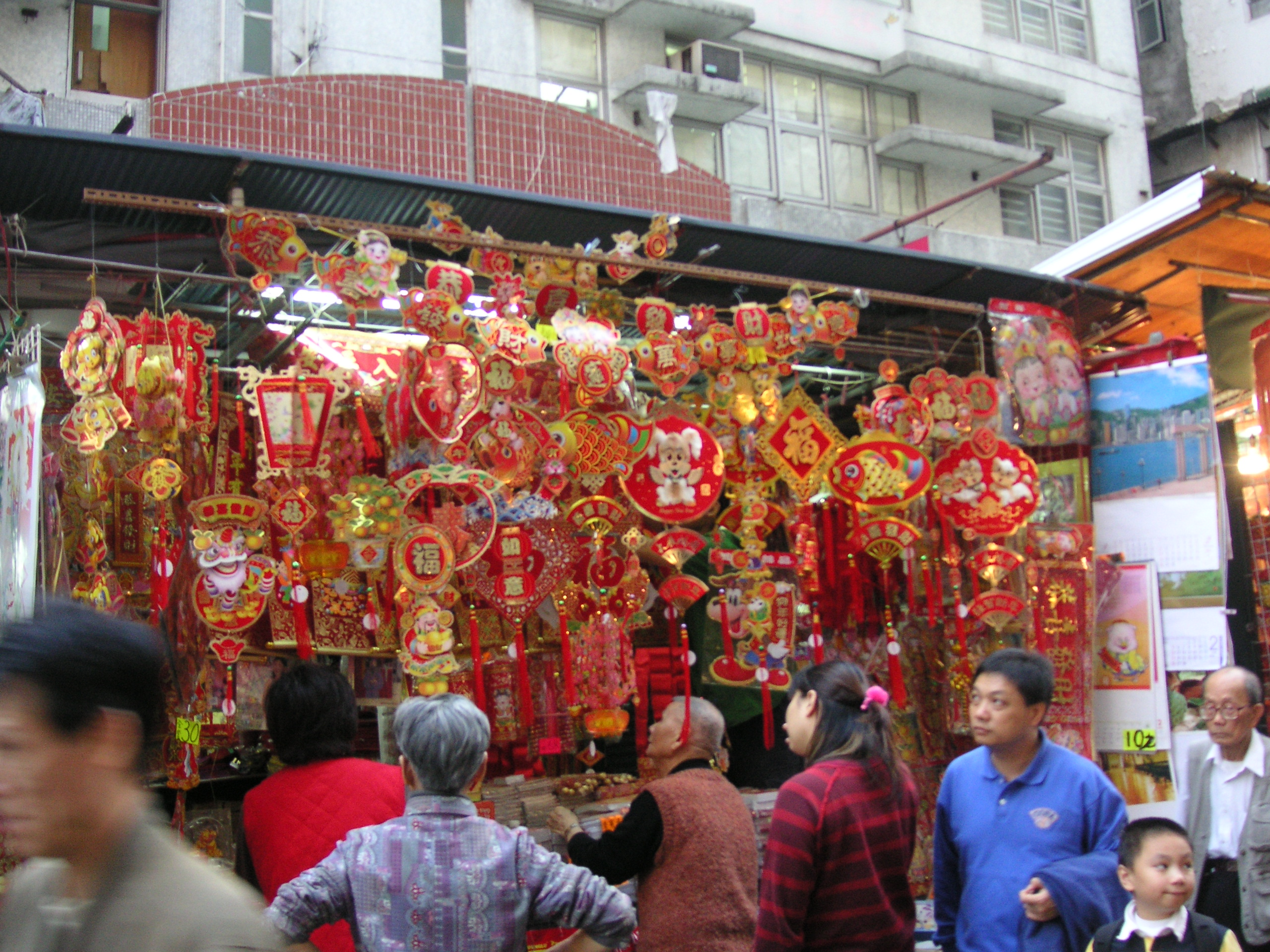
Blessing of Fuk Wa Street

Fuk Wa Street (Chinese: 福華街; Cantonese Yale: fuk1 wa4 gaai1) is a street in Cheung Sha Wan and Sham Shui Po, New Kowloon, Hong Kong.

== Name ==
Unlike other streets in the area, Fuk Wa Street is not named after a place in China. Its name means blessing (fuk, 福) and prosperous (wa, 華) while its brother street Fuk Wing Street glorious, prosperous (wing, 榮). Upon creation, it was named Om Yau Street (菴由街), but was later changed.

== Retail ==
Part of the street from Nam Cheong Street to Kweilin Street is a street market from 12 noon until 9 pm, with numerous stalls selling varieties of goods like old books and clothes. The Golden Computer Arcade is located in its section between Yen Chow Street and Kweilin Street. The section of the road due south of Nam Cheong Street is notorious for being the red-light district of Sham Shui Po.

== Features ==
Fuk Wa Street spans from Castle Peak Road to Tai Po Road. It is divided into several sections, interrupted by various building structures.

- A covered nullah on Nam Cheong Street
- Schools including Kowloon Technical School, Cheung Sha Wan Factory Estate, Un Chau Estate and Cheung Sha Wan Catholic School, between Camp Street and Cheung Wah Street

== See also ==
- List of streets and roads in Hong Kong
