= Lai Chi Kok Road =

Road in Kowloon, Hong Kong

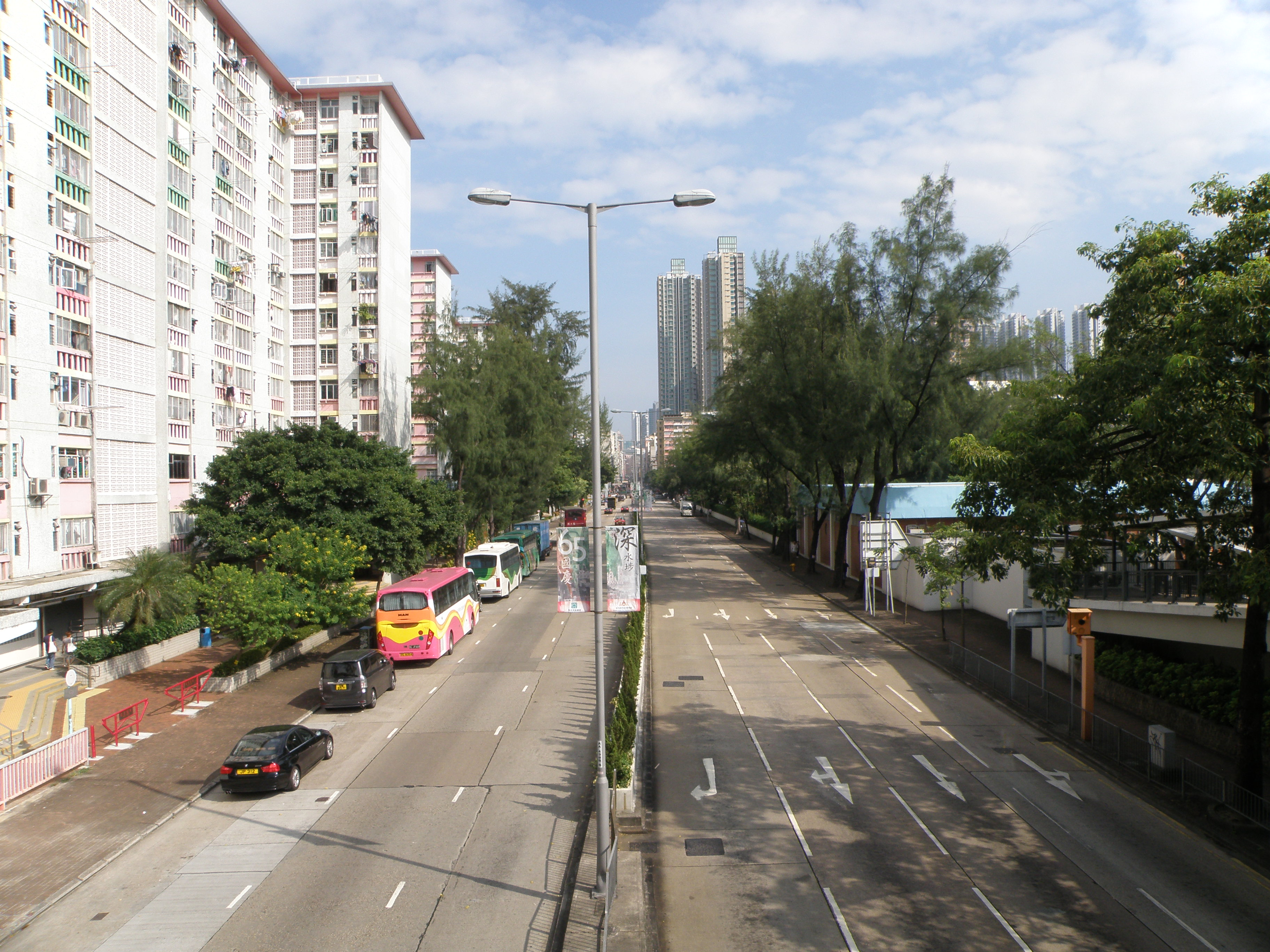
- Lai Chi Kok Road near Lai Kok Estate
- Native name: 荔枝角道 (Yue Chinese)
- Maintained by: Highways Department
- Length: 3.6 km (2.2 mi)
- Location: Kowloon, Hong Kong
- Coordinates: 22°19′53.15″N 114°9′25.08″E

Lai Chi Kok Road
- Chinese: 荔枝角道
Transcriptions
Standard Mandarin
- Hanyu Pinyin: Lìzhījiǎo Dào
Yue: Cantonese
- Jyutping: lai6 zi1 gok3 dou6

Lai Chi Kok Road (Chinese: 荔枝角道) is a road in western Kowloon, Hong Kong. It links Lai Chi Kok to Mong Kok, via Tai Kok Tsui, Sham Shui Po and Cheung Sha Wan. It starts from a junction with Nathan Road near Pioneer Centre in the south and ends near Mei Foo Sun Chuen. The road is bidirectional except the section at Lai Chi Kok, between the junction with Butterfly Valley Road and Mei Foo Sun Chuen, where it serves New Territories-bound traffic only. The Kowloon-bound traffic uses Cheung Sha Wan Road, separated by the flyover of Kwai Chung Road. The road once hosted shipyards, fish, meat and vegetable wholesale markets, which were moved closer to the coast after extensive reclamation.

== Description ==
Lai Chi Kok is classified by the Hong Kong government as a primary distributor road. It is approximately 3.6 kilometres (2.2 mi) long and is maintained by the Highways Department.

== Development ==
Lai Chi Kok Road was created in the early 20th century after New Kowloon was acquired by the United Kingdom under the 1898 lease of the New Territories. The government was keen to develop New Kowloon, which was then a rural area, and Sham Shui Po was the first area where work was started. Indigenous residents of Sham Shui Po Village were moved out with monetary compensation or land exchange. According to one source, the rectangular road network there, within which Lai Chi Kok Road forms a principal thoroughfare, was planned in 1905. Some of the first residential buildings in the redeveloped Sham Shui Po were completed in 1911 along Lai Chi Kok Road between Pei Ho and Kweilin streets. Land reclamation in the area began in 1912 and continued in stages for years.

After a military base, Sham Shui Po Camp, was constructed on part of the reclaimed land, Lai Chi Kok Road terminated at the entrance to the base, just beyond Sham Shui Po Police Station. In 1959, the British Forces gave 9.69 hectares of the Sham Shui Po Camp to the Hong Kong government so that Lai Chi Kok Road could be extended to the new reclamation area in Cheung Sha Wan. The base was thereafter bisected by Lai Chi Kok Road.

The area north-west of Tonkin Street was reclaimed from Victoria Harbour in the early 1960s. Lai Chi Kok Road was subsequently extended onto the new land, with the section between Tonkin Street and Kom Tsun Street opening on 1 September 1967. This end of the road was then connected to Kwai Chung Road and Lai Chi Kok Bridge, which opened in 1968. Altogether, the scheme provided a critical new access route to the fast-growing Kwai Chung-Tsuen Wan new town (as well as parts of the western New Territories beyond), thereby relieving the congested and steep Castle Peak Road (which was until then the only route between Kowloon and Tsuen Wan).

The ground-level westbound road south of the Kwai Chung Road flyover, next to Mei Foo Sun Chuen and approximately 570 metres long, was left unnamed after it was constructed. In 1978, the Urban Council decided to name this road section "Lai Chi Kok Road", treating it as a westward extension of Lai Chi Kok Road. This brought Lai Chi Kok Road to its present western terminus at an access ramp to Kwai Chung Road.

The section of Lai Chi Kok Road adjacent to the Cheung Sha Wan industrial area (near Cheung Lai Street) was expanded and reconstructed in the mid-1980s to accommodate the terminus of a western extension to the West Kowloon Corridor, an elevated motorway. The extension to Lai Chi Kok Road opened to traffic on 28 November 1987.

== Landmarks ==
The section in Sham Shui Po was close to the camp of the British Army, where once a detention camp for prisoners of war during the Japanese occupation during World War II was. The Sham Shui Po Police Station at the junction of Yen Chow Street is another historical building.

The historical four-storey building Lui Seng Chun (Chinese: 雷生春) is on 119 Lai Chi Kok Road. The building was restored by the Government of Hong Kong and hosts a Chinese medicine teahouse operated by the Hong Kong Baptist University.

== See also ==
- List of streets and roads in Hong Kong

Preceded by West Kowloon Corridor	Hong Kong Route 5 Lai Chi Kok Road	Succeeded by Kwai Chung Road
