= Pei Ho Street =

Street in Sham Shui Po, Hong Kong

Coordinates: 22.33052°N 114.16293°E

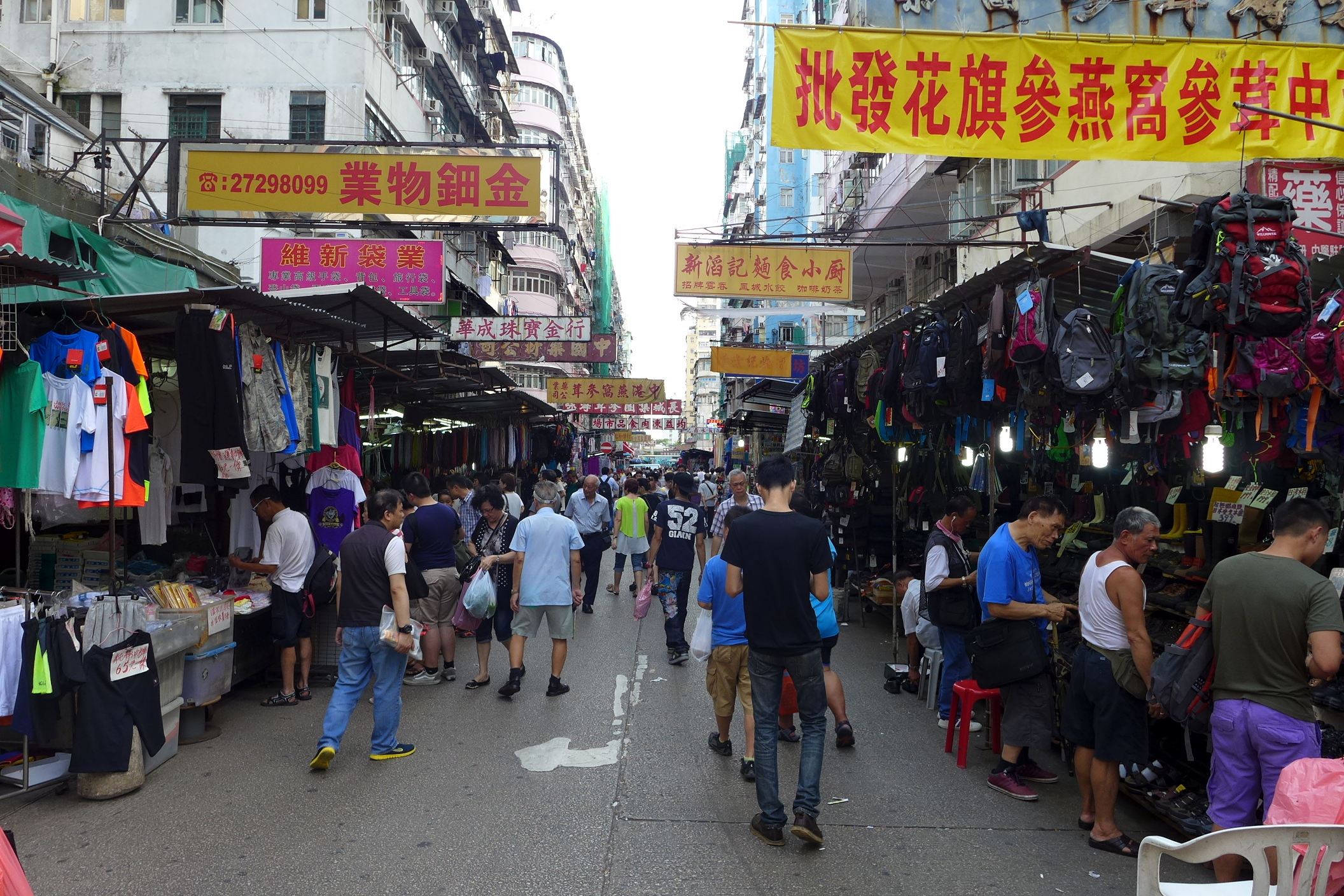
Hawkers at Pei Ho Street

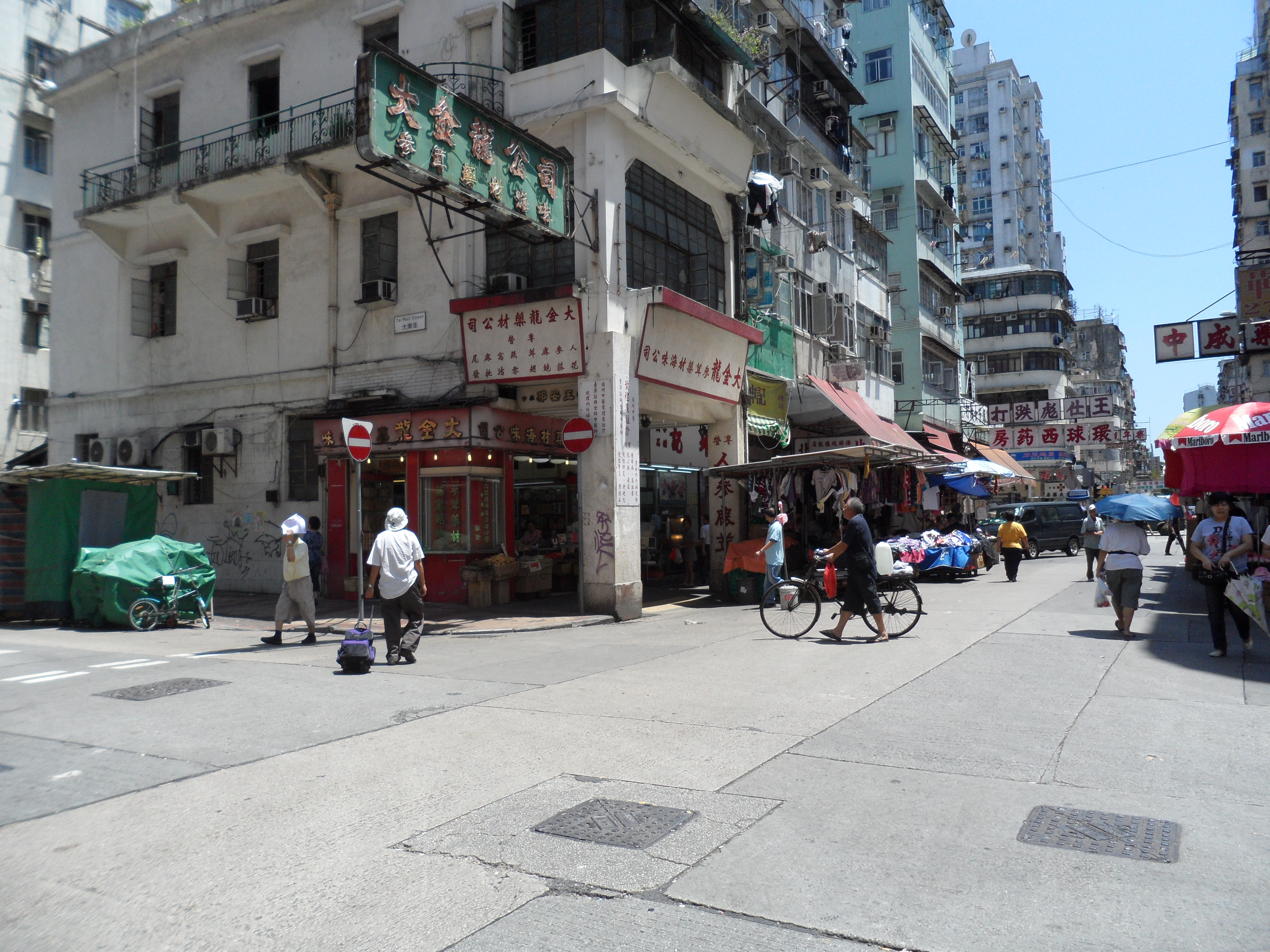
No.58 Pei Ho Street, a Verandah Type tong lau, at the corner of Tai Nan Street.

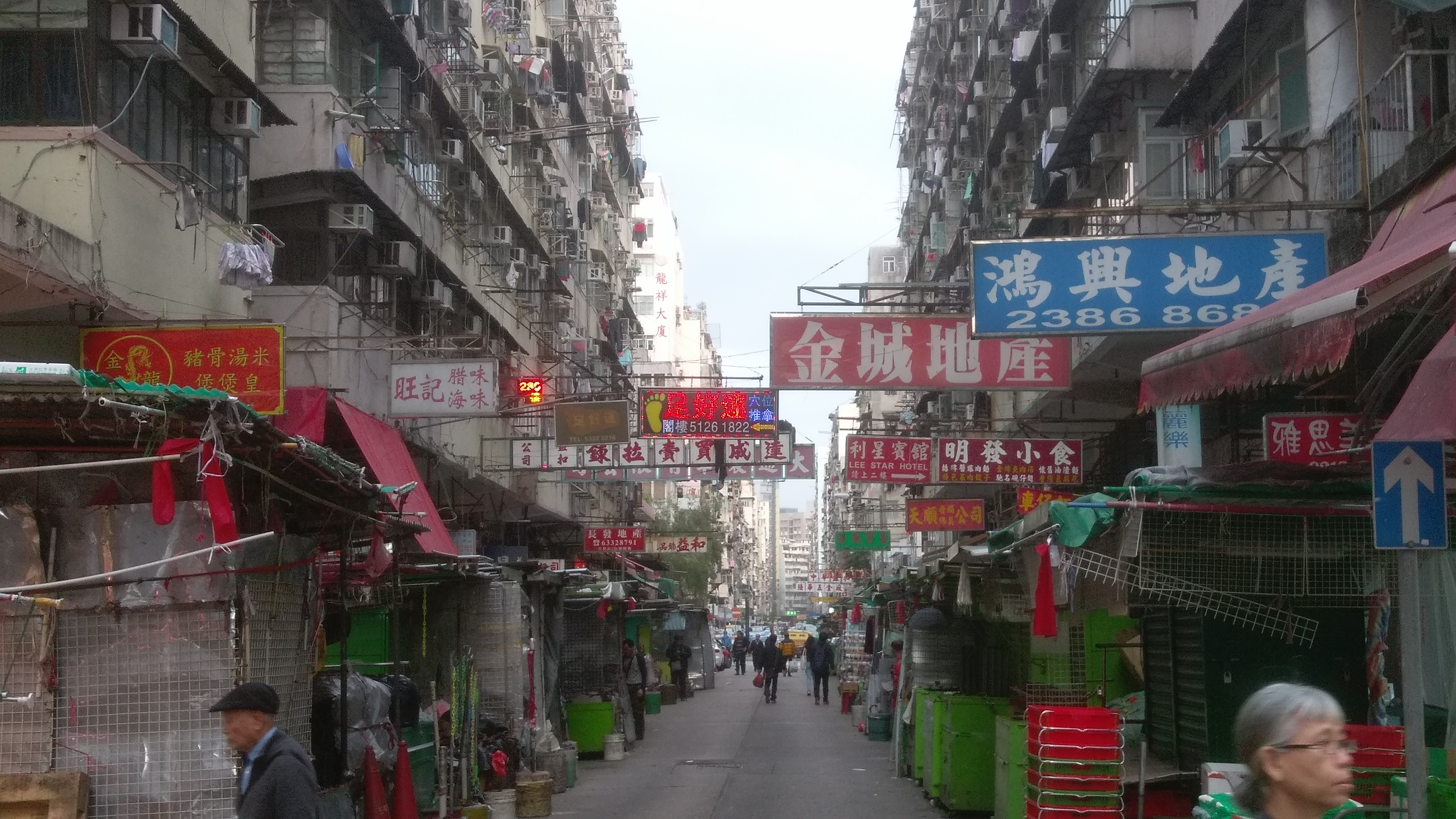
Intersection of Pei Ho Street with Ki Lung Street

Pei Ho Street (Chinese: 北河街; Cantonese Yale: bak1 ho4 gaai1) is street in Sham Shui Po, New Kowloon, Hong Kong. The street is also a market and full of hawkers. The former Urban Council had built a Pei Ho Street Municipal Services Building (then known as Pei Ho Street Urban Council Complex) accommodating some stalls in the old market.

Low economic profile and height limit of buildings on airway of former Kai Tak Airport helps Pei Ho Street to preserve buildings on the earliest planned town of Sham Shui Po in Western Kowloon. The style of Ke Lau (騎樓), balcony with two front pillars, once popular in colonial Hong Kong prior to World War II are easily found on the street.

The end of the Pei Ho Street was the former Sham Shui Po Ferry Pier. The pier was an important ferry pier from 1920s to 1970s. Thousands of commuters took ferry to Central on the Hong Kong Island.

No.58 Pei Ho Street, a tong lau, is a grade II historic building in Hong Kong.

== Name ==
Like many other streets in the surrounding area, the street is named after a major trading city in China. Pei Ho is a river in northern China, collecting water from four other rivers and runs to sea near Taku fortress, the gate to protect Peking. There is also another legend that Pei Ho was the name of a little stream in Pei Ho Street, and the stream was called Pei Ho ( Literally mean stream flows to the north ). References: ( 北河街（ Pei Ho Street ) ( 北河街 )

== See also ==
- List of streets and roads in Hong Kong
