= Yen Chow Street =

Street in Kowloon, Hong Kong

Coordinates: 22.33128°N 114.16089°E

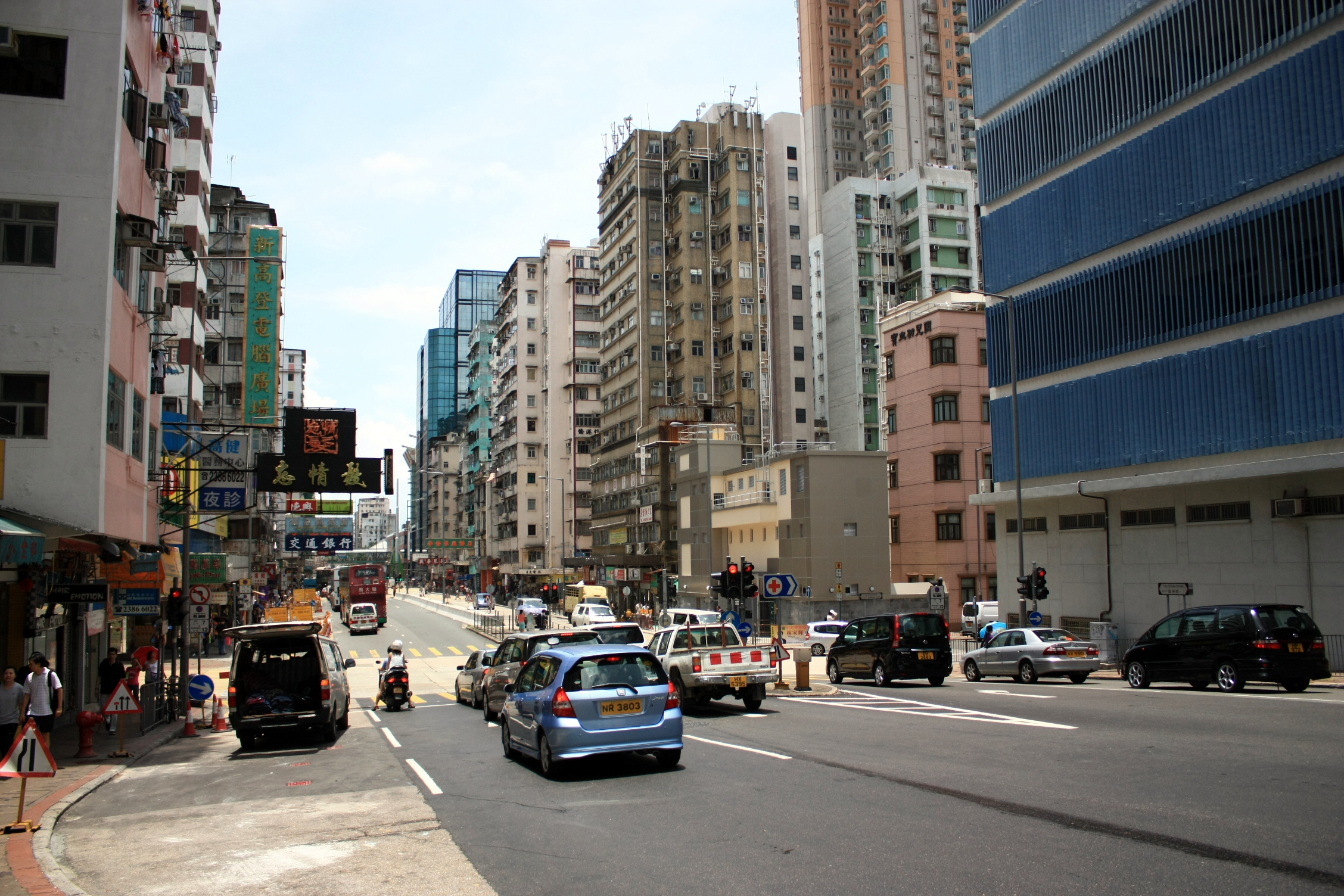
Yen Chow Street

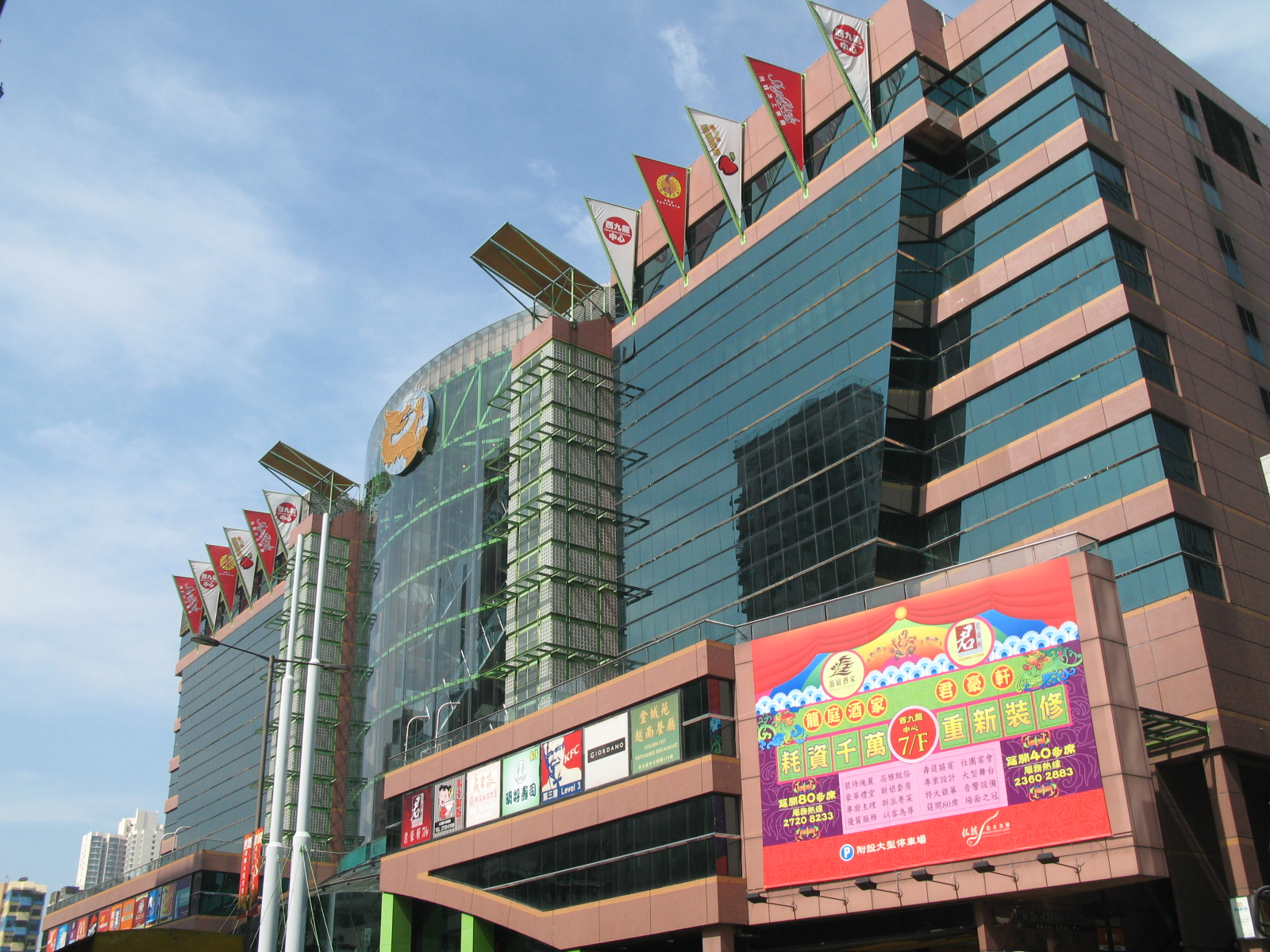
Dragon Centre along Yen Chow Street

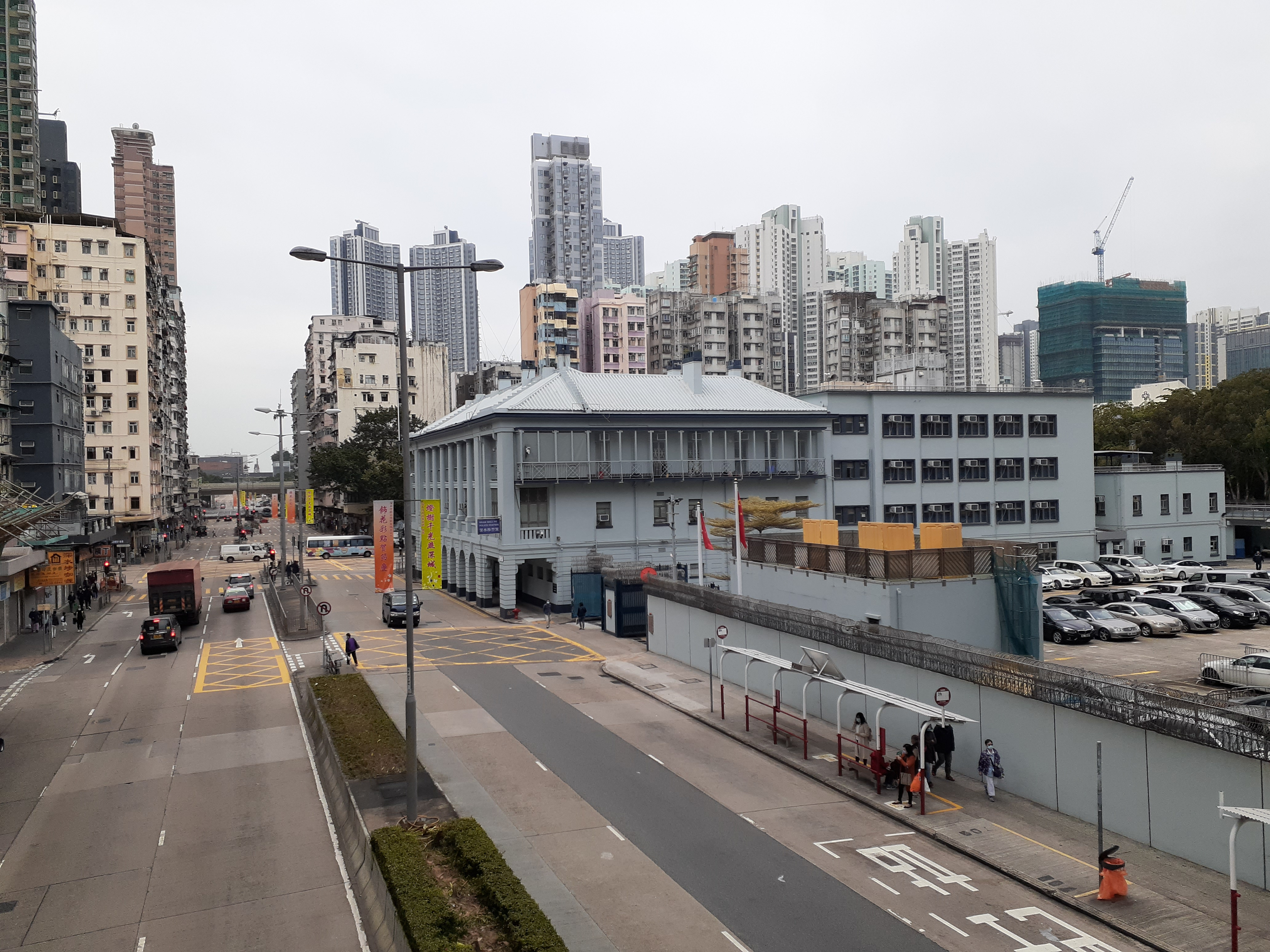
Sham Shui Po Police Station along Yen Chow Street

Yen Chow Street (Chinese: 欽州街) is a main street in Sham Shui Po, New Kowloon, Hong Kong. It runs from hill side towards the shore of Victoria Harbour, between Castle Peak Road and Sham Mong Road. Its extension Yen Chow Street West (欽州街西) spans further to the reclamation shore.

== Name ==
The street was named after Yen Chow, also spelt Yamchow, a coastal city in western Kwangtung (Guangdong) in China at that time. The city is currently under the administration of Guangxi and spelt Qinzhou.

== Yen Chow Street ==
Yen Chow Street (欽州街) crosses many main streets such as Castle Peak Road, Cheung Sha Wan Road and Lai Chi Kok Road. Featured landmarks and attractions in the area could be found on both side of the street. Golden Computer Centre, Sham Shui Po Police Station, Dragon Centre, the Yen Chow Street Hawker Bazaar, and Apliu Street are some of examples.

== Yen Chow Street West ==
Yen Chow Street West (欽州街西) is a street extension on West Kowloon Reclamation. The interchange station of West Rail line Nam Cheong station and MTR Nam Cheong station is located near its junction with Sham Mong Road and Nam Cheong Park on the other side. On the southwestern end of the street, which is on the border between Sham Shui Po and Yau Tsim Mong districts, is the Cheung Sha Wan Wholesale Fish Market.

== See also ==
- List of streets and roads in Hong Kong
