= Bai =

BAI or Bai may refer to:

== BAI ==
=== Organizations ===
- BAI Communications, telecommunications infrastructure company
- BAI (organization), professional organization for financial services in the United States
- Badminton Association of India, India's governing body for badminton
- Banco Angolano de Investimentos, a bank in Angola
- Black in AI, a technology research organization in the United States
- Board of Audit and Inspection, supreme audit institution of South Korea
- Brittany Ferries, a French shipping company
- Broadcasting Authority of Ireland, regulator of broadcasting in Ireland
- Bureau of Animal Industry, formerly an agency of the United States Department of Agriculture
- WBAI, a listener-supported radio station in New York City

=== Science ===
- Beck Anxiety Inventory, a psychological assessment tool
- Body adiposity index, a method of measuring body fat in humans
- Brain-specific angiogenesis inhibitor 1

=== Other uses ===
- BAI (file format), file format for performing electronic cash management balance reporting
- BA-I, a Soviet armoured car
- Battlefield air interdiction, a military tactic
- Bachelor of Engineering aka Baccalaureus in Arte Ingeniaria, an academic degree

== Bai ==
=== People ===
- Bai (surname), a Chinese surname
- Marcus Bai (born 1972), Papua New Guinean rugby league player
- Matt Bai (1968-), American political columnist
- Seremaia Bai (born 1979), Fijian rugby union player

=== Places ===
- Bai, Iran, a village in Razavi Khorasan Province, Iran
- Bai, Nepal, village in Bajura District, Nepal
- Bai Prefecture, a prefecture in Imperial China
- Baicheng County, Xinjiang, China, known in Uyghur as Bai
- Băi, a village in Vidra Commune, Alba County, Romania
- Băi, a river in Dâmbovița and Giurgiu Counties, Romania
- Mbeli Bai, Congo

=== Ethnicity or language ===
- Bai people, a Chinese ethnic group
  - Bai language, language spoken by Bai people
- Bai people (South Sudan), ethnic group in South Sudan
  - Bai language (South Sudan), a Ubangian language
- Bai (Kibay), a dialect of the Bantu Sakata language
- Balong (Bai), a variety of the Bantu Bafaw-Balong language
- Bamileke languages (ISO 639 alpha-3, bai), a group of languages spoken in Cameroon

=== Other uses ===
- Bai (decoration), an imperial Vietnamese decoration for merit set with rubies
- Bai (house), a traditional village meeting house
- Bai (suffix), a naming tradition in Maratha and Rajput dynasties
- Obai, pre-colonial rulers of the Temne state of Koya
- Bai Brands, a beverage company

== See also ==
- Bai Island, an island in Malaysia
- Bai Bing (disambiguation)
- Bai Di (disambiguation)
- Bai Lang (disambiguation)
- Bais (disambiguation)
- Pai (surname)
