= Nam Cheong =

Nam Cheong (Chinese: 南昌) is both the Cantonese name for Nanchang and the name of a street in Sham Shui Po, Hong Kong.

In the latter context, several features have been named after Nam Cheong Street:

- Nam Cheong Estate
- Nam Cheong Park
- Nam Cheong station

== See also ==
- Nanchang (disambiguation)
