= Sham Shui Po Park =

Public park in Sham Shui Po, Hong Kong

Coordinates: 22.3308°N 114.1563°E

- 深水埗公園
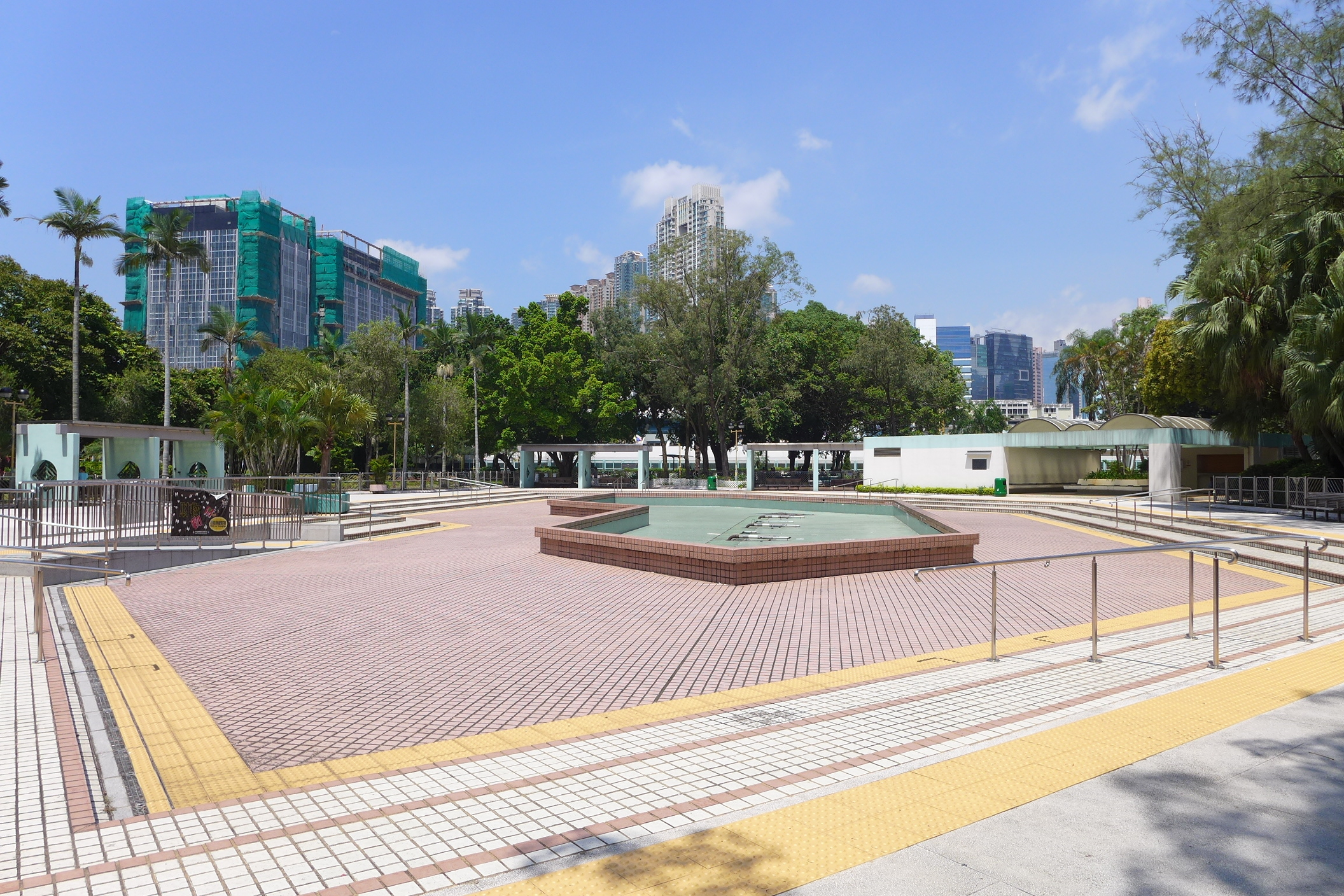
- Fountain plaza
- Location: Sham Shui Po, New Kowloon
- Area: 3.75 hectares (9.3 acres)
- Opened: 9 March 1984; 42 years ago
- Operator: Leisure and Cultural Services Department
- Open: Year round
- Public transit: Cheung Sha Wan station Sham Shui Po station Nam Cheong station

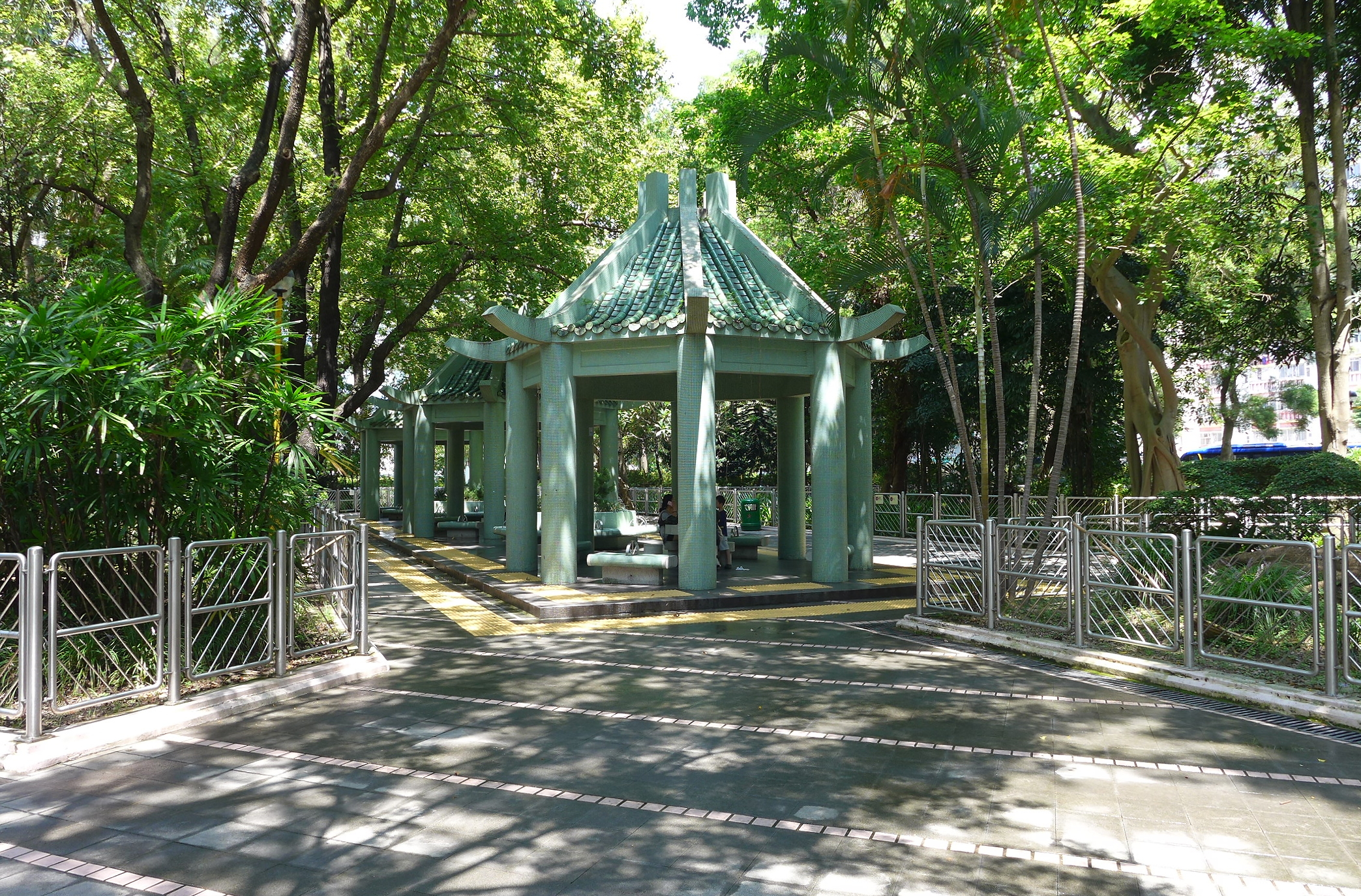
Chinese-style pavilion

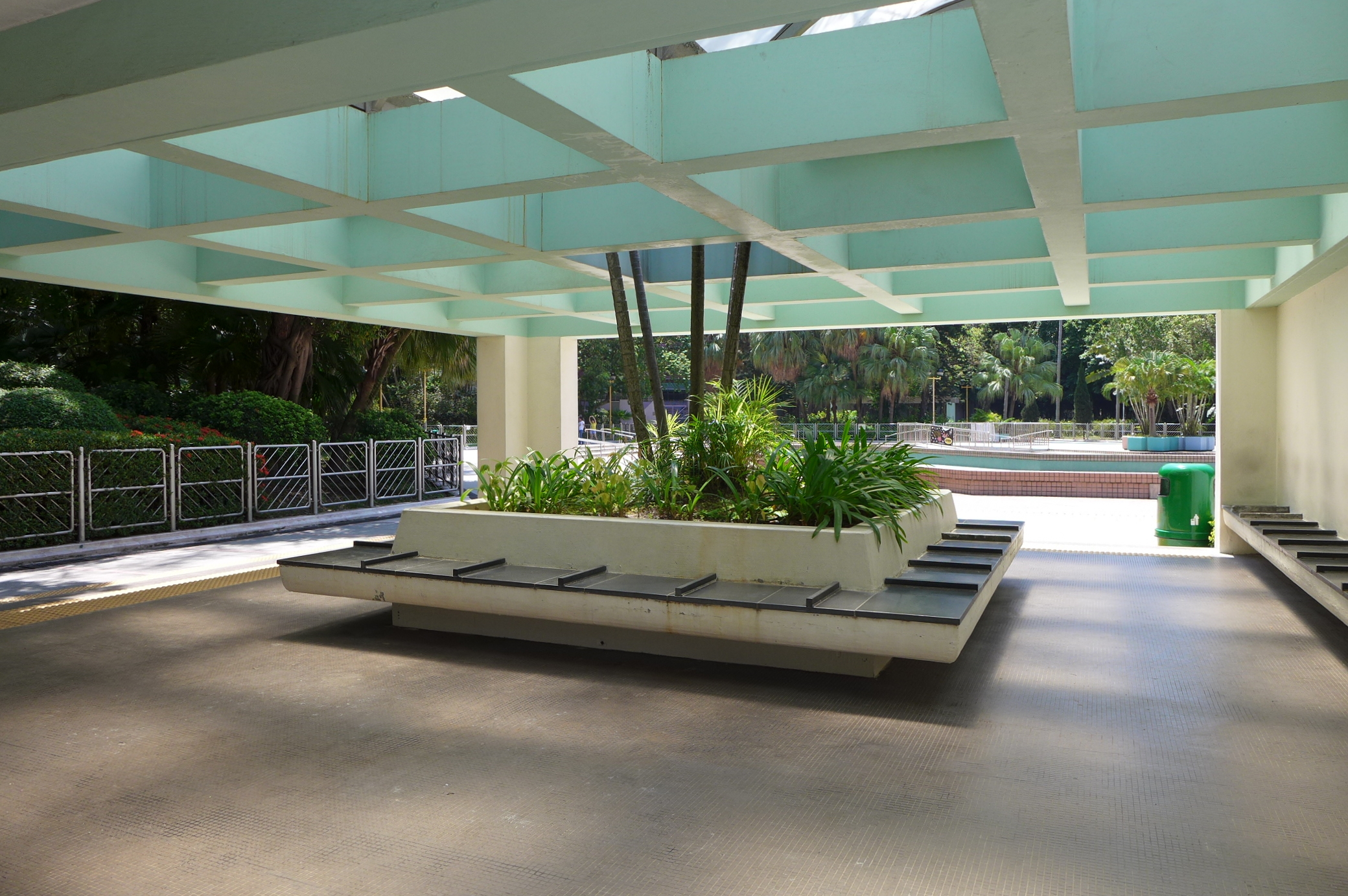
Pavilion

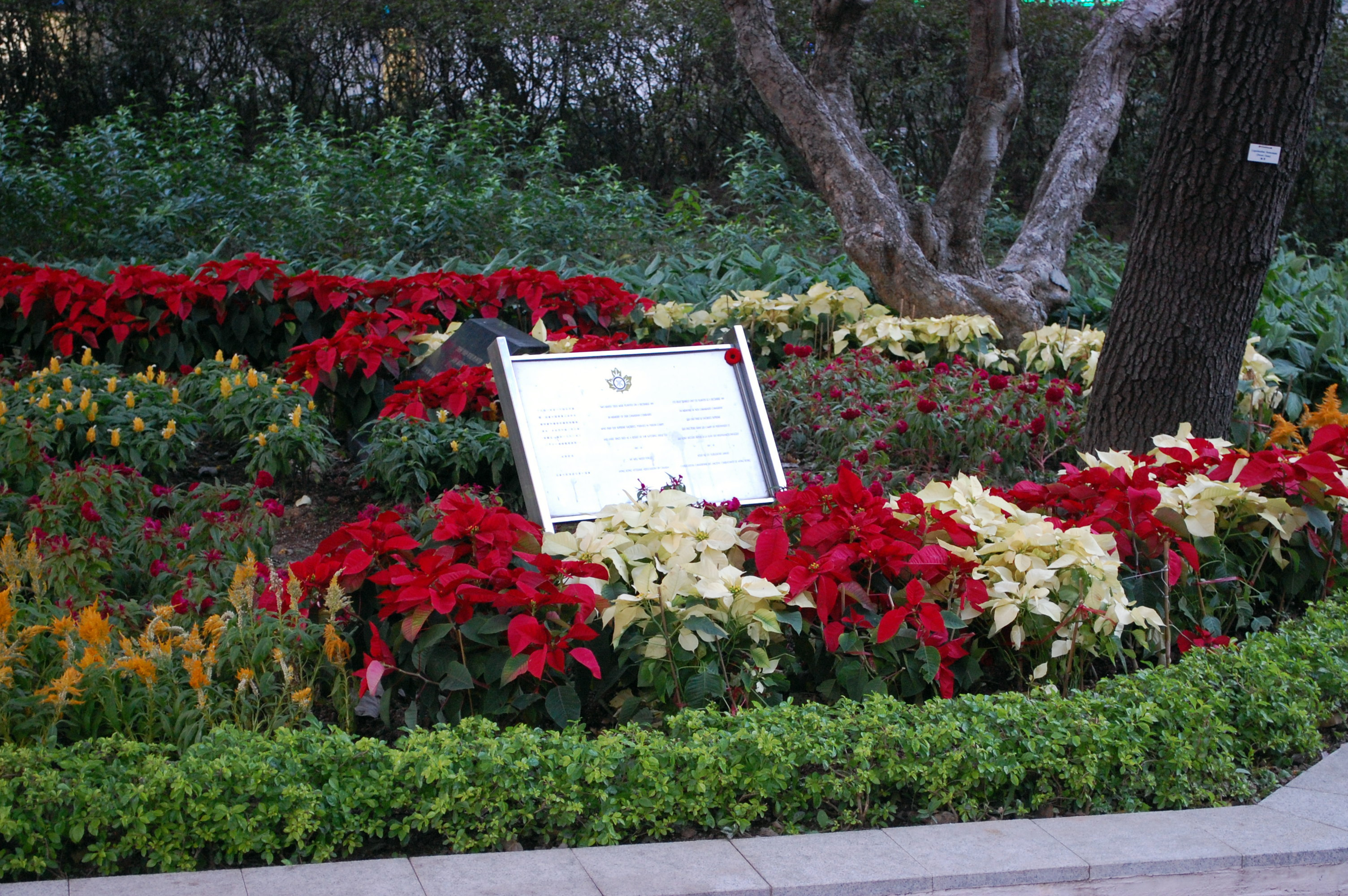
The two memorial plaques (one barely visible behind the other), inaugurated in 1989 and 1991 respectively

Sham Shui Po Park (Chinese: 深水埗公園; Jyutping: sam1 seoi2 bou4 gung1 jyun4) is a park in Sham Shui Po, New Kowloon, Hong Kong. It comprises two physically discontiguous sites on either side of Lai Chi Kok Road. The larger site is more well-known as Sham Shui Po Park. The smaller, located within Lai Kok Estate and originally managed by the Housing Authority, became part of Sham Shui Po Park when it was transferred to the Leisure and Cultural Services Department.

The park was built on reclaimed land originally home to the Sham Shui Po Barracks.

== History ==
The first phase of the park, built at a cost of $9.8 million, was completed in November 1983. It was officially opened on 9 March 1984 by Urban Councillor Elsie Elliott. The Sham Shui Po Park Swimming Pool opened in 1985.

Sham Shui Po Park (Stage II) was an extension of the park on two physically separate sites – one contiguous with the original park. The contiguous site was once occupied by a temporary housing area and the Cheung Sha Wan Temporary Fresh Water Fish Market. Part of the fish market site was eventually used for the construction of the Ka Ling School of The Precious Blood, which was originally slated to be built within the boundary of Lai Kok Estate. The Urban Council gave up the land for this school in exchange for land within Lai Kok Estate (see below). Stage II was completed in 2008.

The Yen Chow Street Temporary Housing Area site was once occupied by the Jubilee Buildings, apartments for British Army families completed in 1935. These were used (as was the whole site) as a prisoner-of-war camp during the Japanese occupation from 1941 to 1945. Following the Vietnam War and the influx of Vietnamese refugees to Hong Kong it became the Jubilee Transit Centre. Originally designed to house 500 members of army families, the population of Vietnamese refugees swelled to more than 3,000 by 1983. Caritas Hong Kong took over the camp and managed it, running within its confines a nursery, a recreation centre, a clinic, minors quarters, and a school.

The refugee camp site was then occupied by the temporary housing area, with a capacity of 278 housing units. It was cleared in the late 1990s for the park extension and most of the families were resettled in public housing.

The smaller site also used for the Stage II expansion, discontiguous with the first phase of the park, is located within Lai Kok Estate, on the opposite side of Lai Chi Kok Road, and formerly came under the management of the Housing Department. It was opened as a park in 1984 and redeveloped in the 2000s (as part of the Stage II expansion project). During the redevelopment the bicycle field and the volleyball courts were removed and replaced with a landscaped garden.

== Memorial ==
The park was once occupied by the Sham Shui Po Camp. During the Japanese occupation of Hong Kong between 1941 and 1945, the camp was used for prisoners of war. Many of them died in the camp.

Inside the park, several trees were planted 26 August 1989 by Hong Kong Prisoners of War Association in memory of the soldiers who died during the Battle of Hong Kong and in the prison during that period.

Furthermore, two maple trees were planted by Hong Kong Veterans Association of Canada on 5 December 1991 in memory of Canadian soldiers who died in the detention camp.

== Crows ==
In the early 2000s, the park and surrounding areas attracted many crows to resite to cause much nuisance to residences nearby. The first wave of bird flu outbreak of type H5N1 at the time aroused much concern to the community.

== Features ==
- Basketball court
- Fountain (no longer operable)
- Gateball court
- Jogging track
- Swimming pool
- Tai chi courts
- Toilets
- War memorial plaques

== See also ==
- List of urban public parks and gardens in Hong Kong
- Nam Cheong Park
- Tung Chau Street Park
