= Nan Chiang =

Nan Chiang may refer to:

- SS Nan Chiang, a Panamanian cargo ship in service 1947-50
- Chiang Nan (actor), Chinese actor in 18 Bronzemen

== See also ==
- Nanchang (disambiguation)
