= William Burgess Pryer =

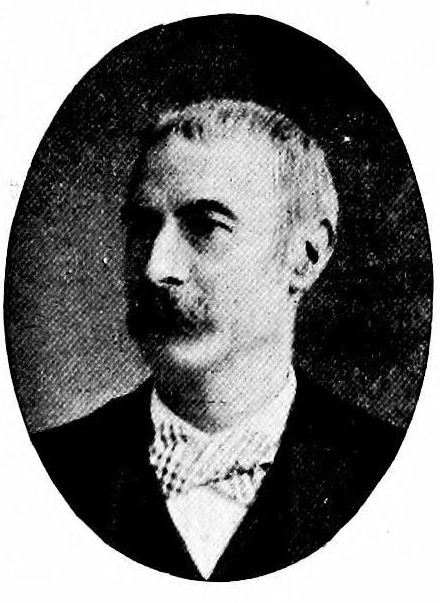
William B. Pryer, the founder of Sandakan.

William Burgess Pryer (7 March 1843 in London, England; – 7 January 1899 in Suez, Egypt) was the first British Resident in Sandakan of North Borneo. Pryer's character is described as adventurous, diligent, and goal-oriented. He spent 12 years in Shanghai, and also explored large parts of the Spanish East Indies (Philippines), and he was a former amateur boxing champion.

== Personal life ==
Pryer was born in London on 7 March 1843 as the son of Thomas and Isabel Pryer. He was the elder brother of Henry Pryer (died in 1888), (Note: Henry James Stovin Pryer, English Entomologist, born 10.vi.1850, London; died 12.ii.1888, Yokohama, Japan.) who is well known in connection with Japanese Lepidoptera and was a corresponding member of the Zoological Society since 1880.

=== Early career ===
In his earlier days, he was an enthusiastic collector of British Lepidoptera. In 1860, he went out to China in connection with the silk and tea house of his relatives Messrs. Thorne Bros., Shanghai, where he remained for twelve years, and devoted considerable attention to collecting the Lepidoptera, of which very little was then known. An account of an expedition he made to the wonderful Snowy Valley appeared in the 'Entomologist's Monthly Magazine,' vol. xiv. Among the results of his work in China was the discovery of many new species, which were described by Messrs. Butler, Moore, and others, and a few by himself in a paper in the 'Cistula Entomologiea,' vol. ii. The collection he formed there afterwards passed into the possession of Messrs, Salvin, Godman and the British Museum. In 1887, he wrote on the butterflies of Borneo with William Lucas Distant.

=== North Borneo Chartered Company ===
He then began his professional career as an accountant at Thorne & Company, a British company in Shanghai. During his time in China where he met Baron von Overbeck and Alfred Dent, who negotiated with the rulers of the territories in northern Borneo a concession for their colonial interests. Overbeck and his business partners then sailed to England to raise funds for the planned company. After a short experience of business in London, he began to travel to North Borneo in 1877. After the treaty had been done with the help of William Clark Cowie, a European close friend of the Sultan of Sulu on 22 January 1878, Pryer was given the title Resident of the East Coast on 11 February 1878 as a sign of their claim to the new territory in northern Borneo at the old trading station of Cowie.

The trading station was founded on Timbang Island by German settlers who were Pryer's predecessors in the region, although located further southwest of today's port town. From his provisional "residence", Pryer began to explore the environment and implement Overbeck's orders to build up friendly relations with the indigenous population, respecting the local customs, to include their chiefs in jurisprudence and to deal with matters of acquisition and sale of land concerned. In 4 September 1878, Pryer's resolve was tested; El Dorado, a Spanish cannon boat had entered the port. The boat captain, Lobe, informed Pryer that he would raise the Spanish flag on the order. Pryer resisted and convinced the Suluk chief, Nakoda Alee to position his warriors in front of the houses in full warfare. In view of the belligerent presence, the Spaniards renounced further hostilities and threatened to return with reinforcement from Manila; a threat which never materialised.

On 15 June 1879, the German settlement was burnt down completely, Pryer took the opportunity to move the settlement to the present place in Sandakan Bay. His decision proved to be a wise one because the settlement that was founded on 21 July 1879 on the previously uninhabited jungles and mangrove forests grew faster than any other in North Borneo. Pryer named the settlement as Elopura (beautiful town in Sanskrit) and became the founder of Sandakan. It was also Pryer, who proposed to make William Hood Treacher the governor of North Borneo. Treacher had already been present at the negotiations with the Sultan of Sulu, and had appointed Pryer as a consular agent, before being left by Overbeck in the German settlement. Treacher and Pryer were united by the enthusiasm with which they pioneered their task, but the arrival of other officials increasingly led to conflicts.

On 10 December 1883, Pryer married Ada Blanche Locke and began to retire from the administration post. After his retirement, he purchased the Bai Island in Sandakan Bay, planting coconuts, coffee and betel nut palms and ran cattle. At Beatrice Estate, which is another plantation near Elopura, Pryer experimented with the cultivation of new products. He completely failed in the cultivation of tobacco starting in 1892, but predicted a decade before the natural rubber boom that the rubber tree was the ideal working plant for the indigenous coastal inhabitants.

=== Correspondence with Rizal ===
Pryer and his wife met with José Rizal, the national hero of the Philippines, on their trip to Hong Kong sometime in 1892. Rizal shared his idea of a Filipino community in North Borneo for those who were dispossessed of their lands in Calamba by the Dominicans under the North Borneo Project. Pryer was receptive of the idea, and corresponded with Rizal to finalise the details of the lease. Rizal then request the permission of the Governor-General of the Philippines at the time, Eulogio Despujol for the proposed project and he also reportedly request for permission to change his nationality to be qualified to emigrate to North Borneo, although the request were rejected by the Governor-General.

== Retirement and death ==
Pryer retired in 1892 after an agreement with the supervisory board of the North Borneo Chartered Company to acquire his estate, about 20 kilometres north of Sandakan along with a further property at Kabeli, an inflow of Sandakan Bay where Pryer cultivated sugar cane, nutmeg, cocoa, cotton, gambier plant and rubber. At the same time, his health had been worsening; as he was increasingly suffering from severe and unexplained painful conditions. Following this, Pryer decided to return to England in 1898, but died on the way, between 7–8 January 1899 at Suez and was buried there on 11 January. He left his wife without any children.

== Legacy ==
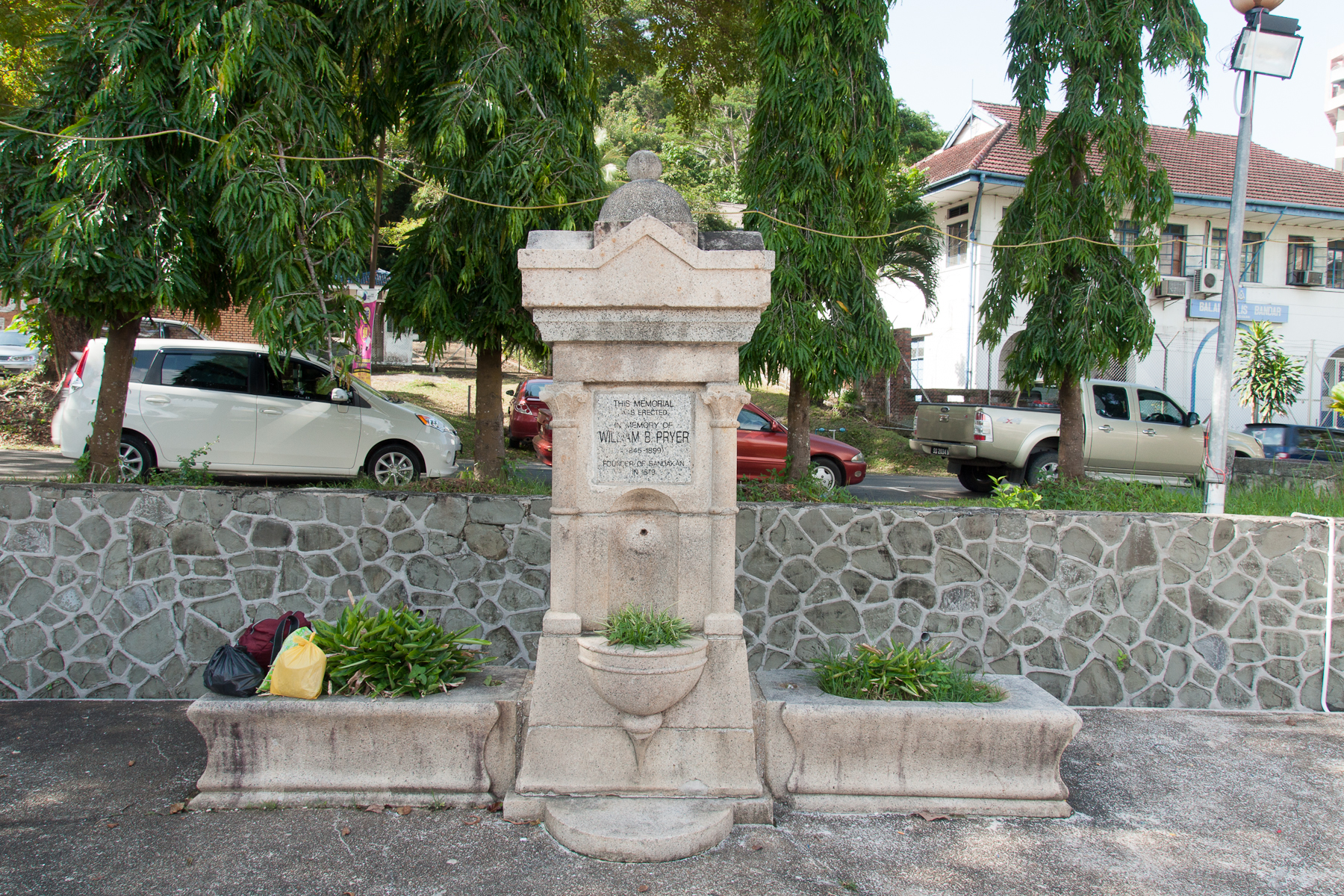
William Burgess Pryer Memorial in Sandakan.

In honour for Pryer, a memorial in the form of a fountain stand in the town of Sandakan. An inscription on the monument says:

This Memorial
was erected
in Memory of
William B. Pryer
1845-1899
Founder of Sandakan
in 1879

== Literature ==
- K. G. Tregonning "William Pryer, The Founder of Sandakan", Journal of the Malayan Branch of the Royal Asiatic Society, Vol. 27, No. 1 (165) (May, 1954), pp. 35–50
- K. G. Tregonning (1965). A History of Modern Sabah (North Borneo, 1881-1963). University of Singapore.
- Mrs. W.B. Pryer: "A Decade In Borneo", London, 1893
