= BAI (organization) =

Bank Administration Institute

BAI (the Bank Administration Institute) is a nonprofit organization in the United States that provides research, training, and thought leadership events for the financial services industry. Headquartered in Chicago, Illinois, BAI also operates Banking Strategies, a daily online financial services publication.

== Organization ==
BAI's mission is to give financial services leaders confidence, information, and resources in order to make smart business decisions, every day. BAI's mission is created on the belief that a strong financial services industry helps consumers, businesses, and communities thrive.

BAI's members include national and global banks, credit unions, mortgage and auto loan providers, money service businesses, and larger lending institutions. In 2016, over 250,000 financial services individuals at more than 1,500 financial services organizations took compliance and professional training courses through BAI.

== History ==
In 1924, several representatives of regional auditors' groups met to discuss issues in the auditing industry. Later that same year they created a national organization—the National Association of Bank Auditors and Controllers (NABAC) —and began to hold annual conventions and distribute a magazine focused on financial industry topics.

In the 1940s, the NABAC established its own office—first in Cleveland and later in Chicago. And the organization began to provide both education and technical research for its members. In 1957, the organization set up the NABAC Research Institute as the first official, collective research effort for the banking industry.

In 1969, NABAC rebranded as Bank Administration Institute (BAI), and had approximately 8,000 member institutions across the U.S.

In 1981, BAI, with Dynamic Data Corp. launched the first electronic information services—Innerline—providing 24-hour access to world news briefs, American Banker news service, financial information on 8,500 publicly held corporations, and email and online registration for BAI conferences.

As of 1997, BAI co-sponsored with ECCHO (Electronic Check Clearing House Organization) the National Electronic Check and Image Exchange Conference.

In 2014, BAI recognized 90 years of service to the financial services industry and provided more than 250,000 individuals with compliance and professional training.

== Business lines ==
BAI is organized into three major divisions: Research, Learning and Development, and Conferences and Events.

BAI's Research division conducts data analysis using account-level data provided from participating financial services organizations. Once data is gathered, the data is then analyzed and compiled using BAI's proprietary database. BAI uses the data in order to present individual organizations with a comparison of their data with the larger peer group of participating organizations. All individual company data is kept confidential, and competitive data is available to participating organizations only in aggregate. As a non-profit organization, BAI does not provide advice or consulting as a part of its research services. Comparative data is presented without additional insight or opinion. BAI Research topics include industry trends, small business banking, retail banking, and commercial banking. Analytics that can be compared include deposit performance, forecasts, market opportunities, and branch performance.

BAI Learning and Development division maintains a software course catalog through BAI's proprietary learning management system, the BAI Learning Manager, which can be accessed and managed by training administrators. The catalog includes more than 250 courses for banks, credit unions, mortgage lenders, and other financial services organizations. Topics cover areas including financial regulations, compliance, professional skills, certifications, and human resources issues. Courses are available from entry to executive level. BAI's course catalog is regularly updated to reflect the latest regulatory trends and issues in compliance and can also be provided to a financial institution's own learning management platform. BAI compliance and professional training can be customized, is updated continually, and is compliant with national regulatory standards.

BAI's Conferences and Events division hosts several industry events with the help of sponsors. Events include a comprehensive banking conference, a global awards program learning conference, executive roundtables, certification programs, and webinars throughout the year.

The following are a few of the main events:

- BAI Global Banking Innovation Awards: An annual awards program that has operated since 2011, the BAI Global Banking Innovation Awards event recognizes innovators within the financial services industry worldwide. Nominations are submitted by the financial services organizations themselves, with winners selected by an independent judging panel, and given the awards at the annual ceremony. A majority of finalists and award winners have historically been awarded to financial services organizations located outside the U.S.
- BAI Beacon: Formerly two separate conferences—BAI Retail Delivery and BAI Payments Connect—BAI Beacon is a two-day "immersive experience" for those in the financial services industry. Topics include sales, marketing and product development, channel strategies, payments strategy and fraud, compliance, small business, analytics, and technology. In 2016, BAI Beacon served as the premiere of the U.S. FinTechStage. Speakers focus on innovation and industry trends.
- Webinars: BAI offers a variety of webinars each year month based on topics deemed relevant to the financial services industry. Topics include regulatory updates, small business banking, mobile payments, retail banking, security and fraud, and key industry trends.

== See also ==
- BAI (file format)
