= Nanchang (disambiguation) =

Nanchang (南昌) is the capital of Jiangxi Province, China

Nanchang may also refer to:

== Locations ==
- Nanchang County (南昌县), a county in Jiangxi, China, under the administration of Nanchang City
- Nanchang District (南长区), a district in Wuxi, Jiangsu, China
- Nanchang Subdistrict (南长街道), a subdistrict in Qiaoxi District, Shijiazhuang, Hebei, China
- Bai Prefecture, a historical prefecture in modern Guangxi, China, known as Nanchang Commandery between 742 and 758

== Military uses ==
- Nanchang Aircraft Manufacturing Corporation, now known as Hongdu Aviation Industry Group
  - Nanchang J-12, supersonic fighter built in the People's Republic of China for use by the PLAAF
  - Nanchang Q-5, Chinese-built jet ground-attack aircraft based on the Soviet MiG-19
  - Nanchang CJ-6, aircraft designed and built in China for use by the People's Liberation Army Air Force (PLAAF)
- CNS Nanchang (DDG-101), the lead ship of the Type 055 destroyer class of guided-missile destroyer in the People's Liberation Army Navy

== Other uses ==
- Nanchang dialect, dialect in Nanchang, Jiangxi, China

== See also ==
- Nam Cheong (disambiguation), Cantonese equivalent
- Nanchong, Sichuan, China
