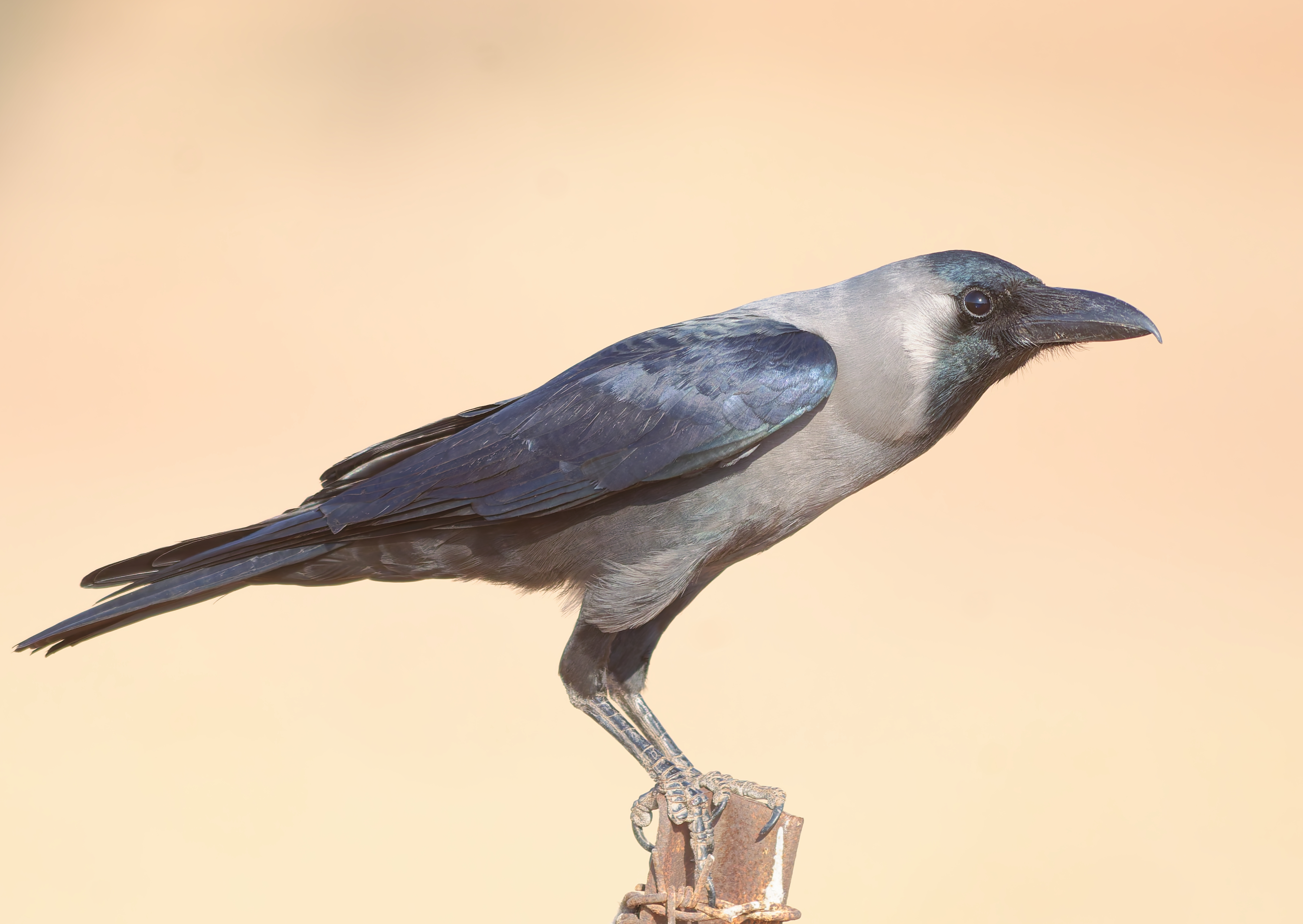
- Corvus splendens ssp. zugmayeri at Desert National Park

Conservation status
- Least Concern (IUCN 3.1)

Scientific classification
- Kingdom: Animalia
- Phylum: Chordata
- Class: Aves
- Order: Passeriformes
- Family: Corvidae
- Genus: Corvus
- Species: C. splendens

Binomial name
- Corvus splendens Vieillot, 1817
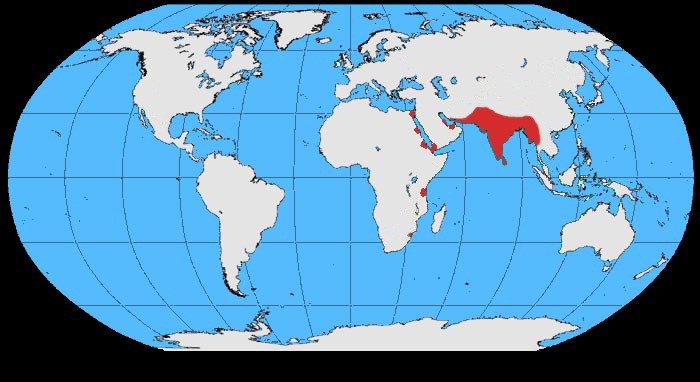

= House crow =

Species of bird

The house crow (Corvus splendens), also known as the Indian, greynecked, Ceylon or Colombo crow, is a common bird of the crow family that is of Asian origin but now found in many parts of the world, where they arrived assisted by shipping. It is between the jackdaw and the carrion crow in size (40 cm (16 in) in length) but is slimmer than either. The forehead, crown, throat and upper breast are a richly glossed black, whilst the neck and breast are a lighter grey-brown in colour. The wings, tail and legs are black. There are regional variations in the thickness of the bill and the depth of colour in areas of the plumage.

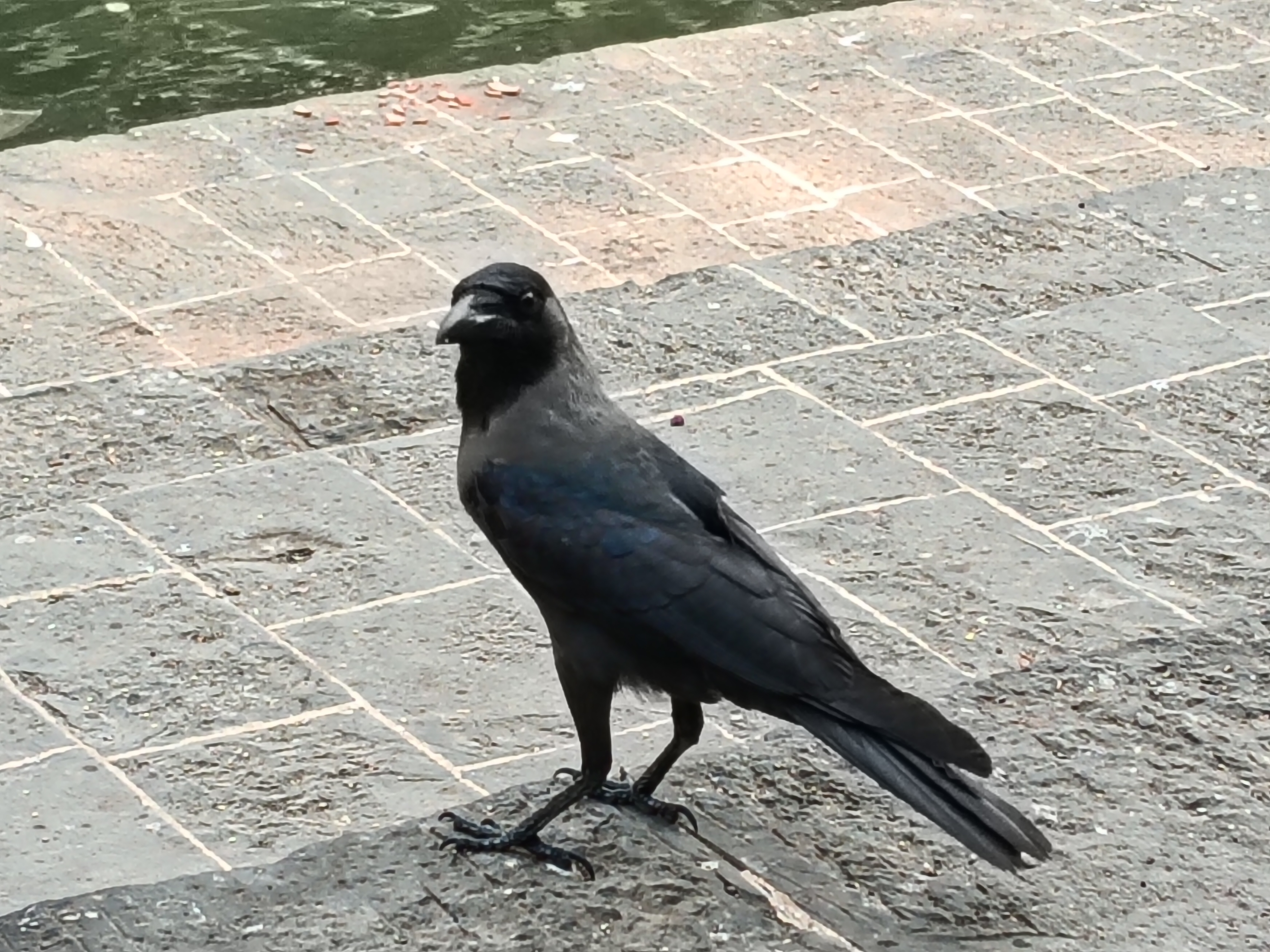
Indian house crow at the bank of Banganga tank in Walkeshwar area of Mumbai.

== Taxonomy ==
The house crow was formally described in 1817 as Corvus splendens by the French ornithologist Louis Vieillot based on a specimen collected in Bengal. The specific epithet is from Latin splendens, splendentis meaning "brilliant" or "glittering".

The nominate race C. s. splendens is found in Pakistan, India, Nepal and Bangladesh and has a grey neck collar. The subspecies C. s. zugmayeri is found in the dry parts of South Asia and Iran and has a very pale neck collar. The subspecies C. s. protegatus is found in southern India, the Maldives (sometimes separated as maledivicus) and Sri Lanka and is darker grey. C. s. insolens, found in Myanmar, is the darkest form and lacks the grey collar.

== Distribution and habitat ==
It has a widespread distribution in southern Asia, being native to Nepal, Bangladesh, India, Pakistan, Sri Lanka, Maldives and Laccadive Islands, southern Myanmar, south Thailand, and coastal southern Iran. It was introduced to East Africa around Zanzibar (about 1897) and Port Sudan. It arrived in Australia via ship but has up to now been exterminated.

A population between 200 and 400 birds has been present in Sham Shui Po, New Kowloon, Hong Kong, in particular Lai Kok Estate and Sham Shui Po Park, as well as Kowloon Tsai Park in Kowloon Tsai.

Recently, it has made its arrival in Europe and has been breeding in the Dutch harbour town Hook of Holland since 1998. An individual has been present in Cork Harbour on the south coast of Ireland since early September 2010. In the New World, a small population of house crows is established in the area around St. Petersburg, Florida. As of April 2009, the introduced population of house crows in Socotra Island, Yemen, has been eradicated to avoid negative ecological effects to endemic species of Socotra.

It is associated with human settlements throughout its range, from small villages to large cities. In Singapore, there was a density of 190 birds/km^{2} in 2001 with efforts to suppress the population in planning.

Due to a human population explosion in the areas it inhabits, this species has also proportionately multiplied. Being an omnivorous scavenger has enabled it to thrive in such circumstances.

== Invasive species ==
The invasive potential for the species is great all over the tropics. This species can make use of resources with great flexibility and appears to be associated with humans, and no populations are known to exist independently of humans. Based on niche-modelling it is estimated that it can also persist in some coastal areas in southern and northwestern Europe. In 2016, house crow was added to the list of invasive alien species of Union concern. The breeding population of this species is reported from Netherlands (Hoek van Holland), while individuals were seen in Belgium, Hungary, Poland and Spain.

== Behaviour ==
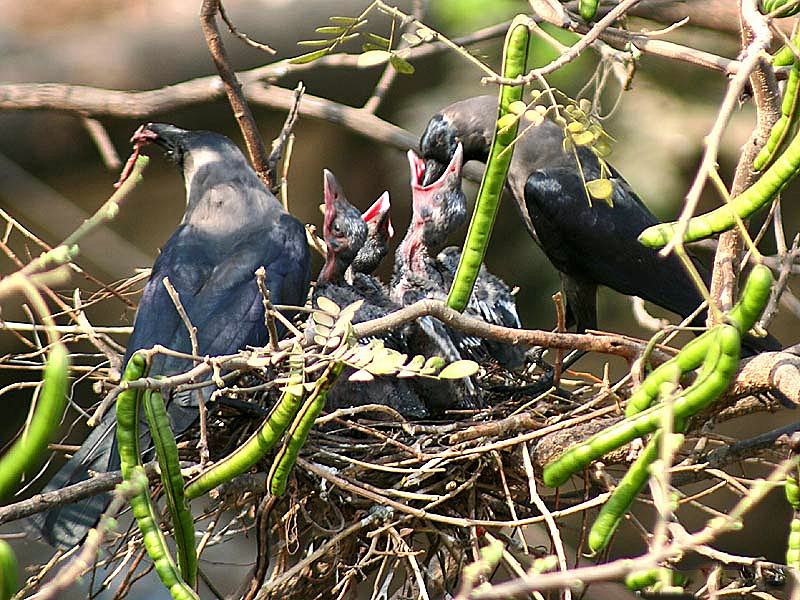
Parents feeding nestlings

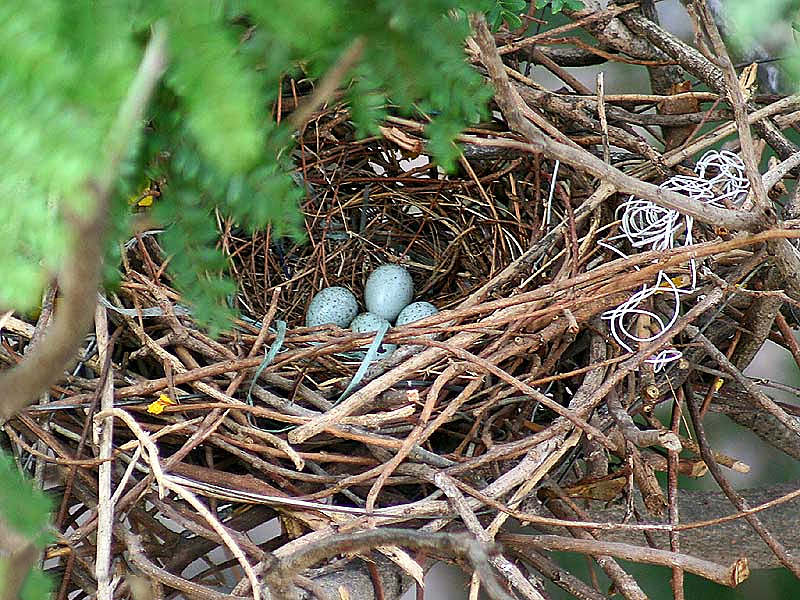
Nest with eggs

=== Diet ===
House crows feed largely on refuse around human habitations, small reptiles and mammals, and other animals such as insects and other small invertebrates, eggs, nestlings, grain and fruits. House crows have also been observed swooping down from the air and snatching baby squirrels. Most food is taken from the ground, but also from trees as opportunity arises. They are highly opportunistic birds and given their omnivorous diet, they can survive on nearly anything that is edible. These birds can be seen near marketplaces and garbage dumps, foraging for scraps. They have also been observed to eat sand after feeding on carcasses.

=== Nesting ===
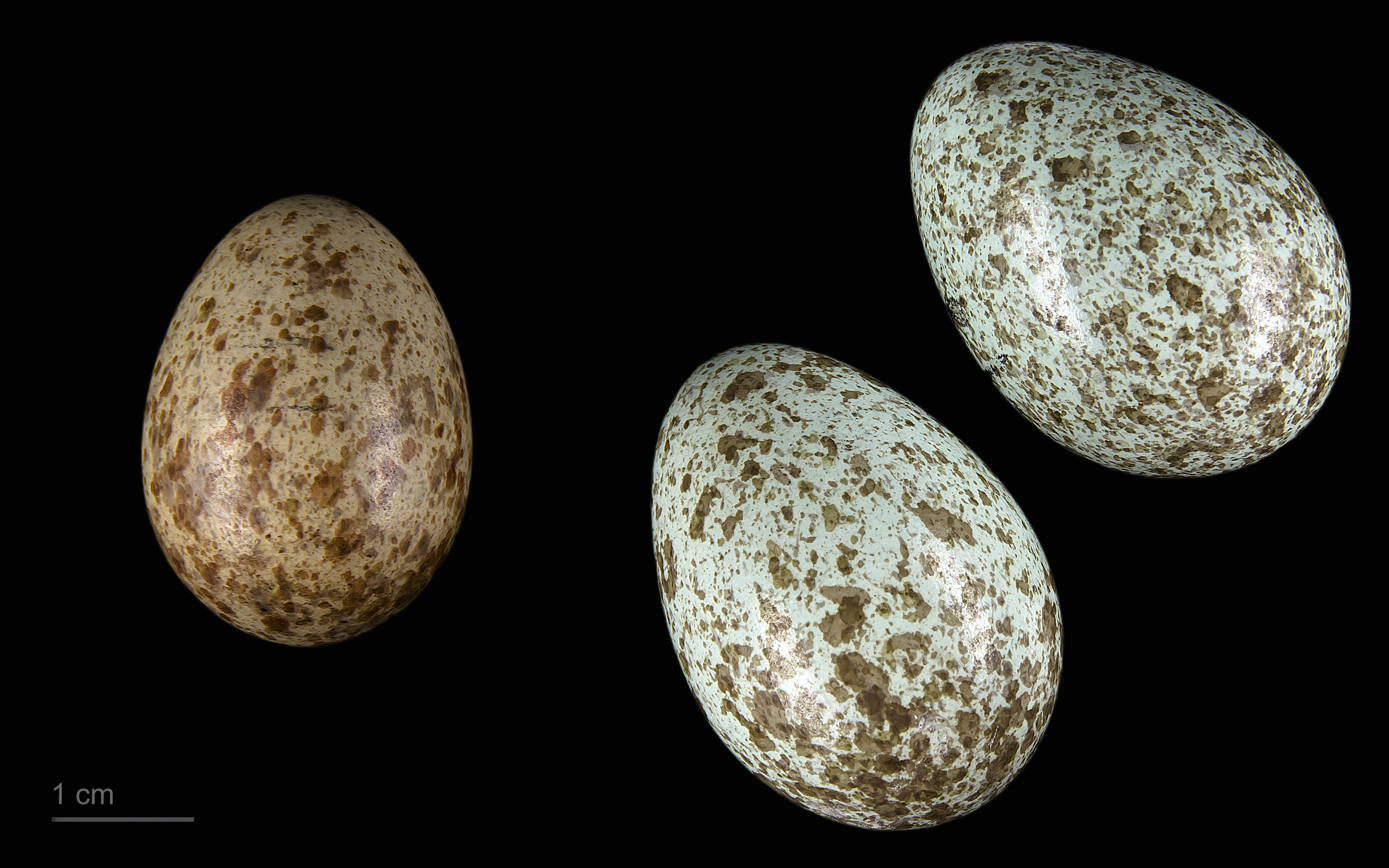
Eudynamys scolopaceus in a clutch of Corvus splendens - MHNT

At least some trees in the local environment seem to be necessary for successful breeding although house crows occasionally nest on telephone towers. It lays 3–5 eggs in a typical stick nest, and occasionally there are several nests in the same tree. In South Asia they are parasitized by the Asian koel. Peak breeding in India as well as Peninsular Malaysia is from April to July. Large trees with big crowns are preferred for nesting.

=== Roosting ===
House crows roost communally near human habitations and often over busy streets. A study in Singapore found that the preferred roost sites were in well-lit areas with a lot of human activity, close to food sources and in tall trees with dense crowns that were separated from other trees. The roost sites were often enclosed by tall buildings. Before flying into roost trees, crows make pre-roosting aggregations perched on TV antennas, roof tops, wayside trees, open fields, and feed or preen during this time.

=== Voice ===
The voice of the house crow is harsh and usually represented by the onomatopoeia "kaaw-kaaw".

=== Tool usage ===
House crows are one of the few corvid species whose tool usage has been well documented

=== Self-recognition ===
It is currently the only known corvid species with an ability to successfully perform the mirror-mark test used for identifying the self-recognition behavior in animals in a laboratory setting.

== Relationship to humans ==
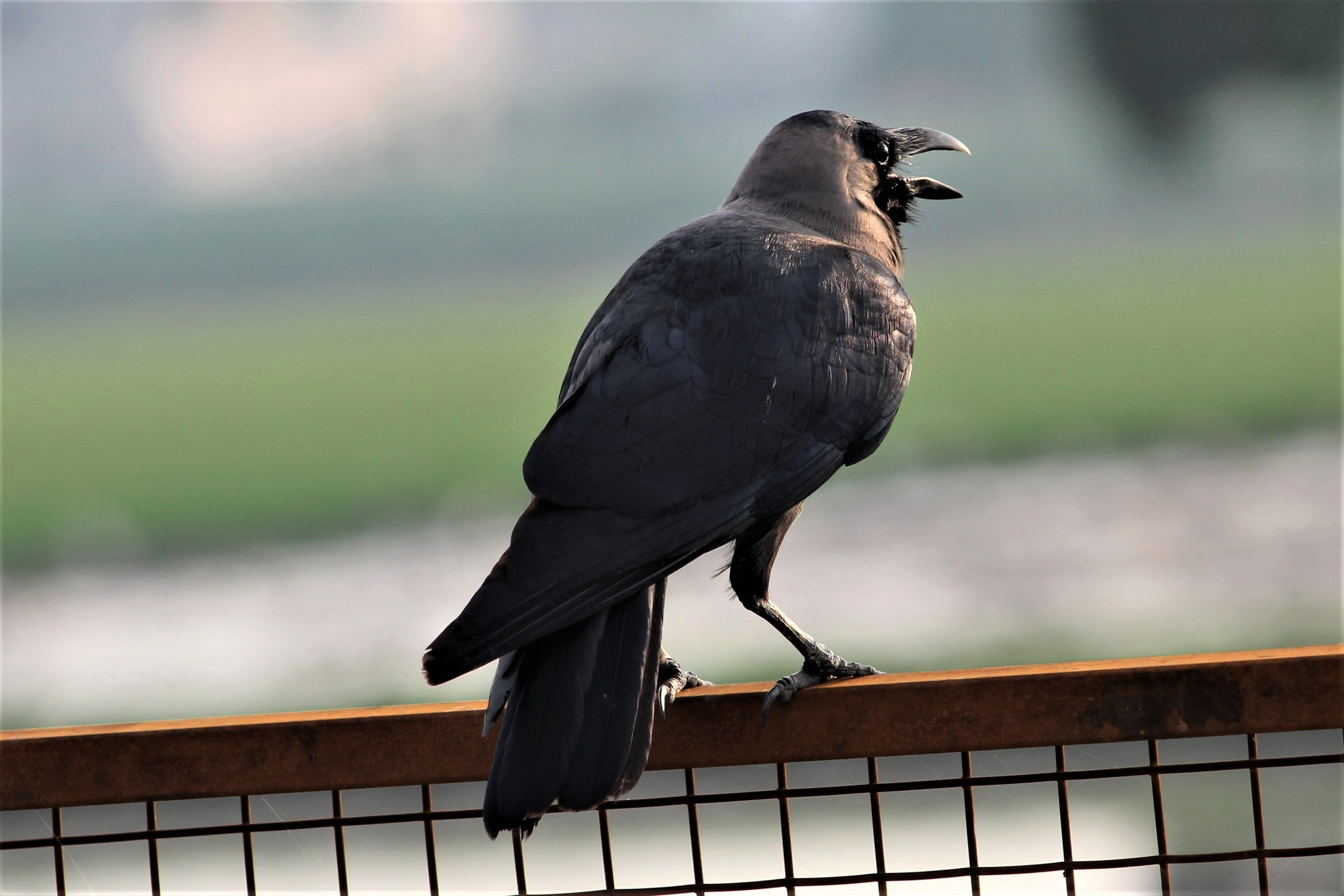
House crow near Chandigarh.

It is suspected that paramyxoviruses, such as PMV 1 that causes of Newcastle disease may be spread by Corvus splendens. Outbreaks of Newcastle disease in India were often preceded by mortality in crows. They have also been found to carry Cryptococcus neoformans, which can cause cryptococcosis in humans.

House crows in Tanzania curiously showed an absence of blood parasites, although some species such as Trypanosoma corvi have been first described from this species. Pathologist T.R. Lewis expressed surprise at the numbers of haematozoa present in the blood of house crows from Calcutta.

== Cultural depictions ==
Due to their large populations around human settlements, The house crows are very common in cultural arts of South Asia such as music, paintings, poems, etc.

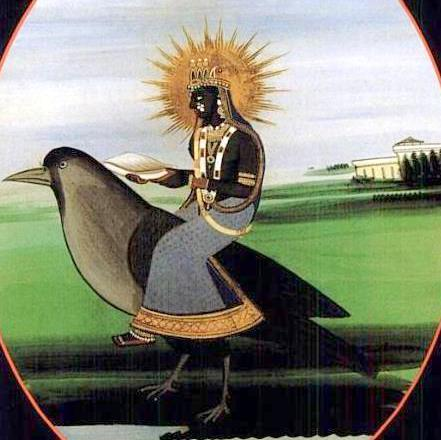
Goddess Dhumavati riding a crow.

The Hindu god Dhumavati, is usually depicted in artworks as riding a crow or in a horseless chariot bearing an emblem of a crow.

== Gallery ==
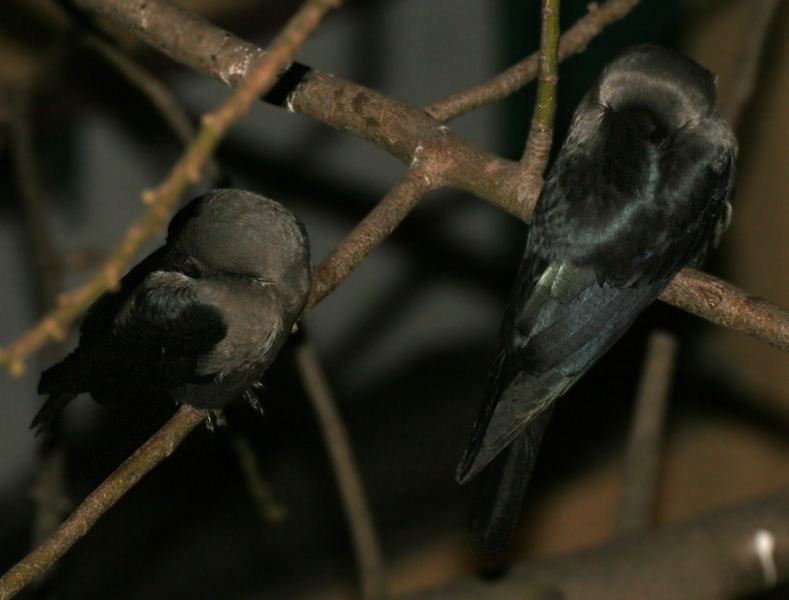
Sleeping at night in Kolkata, West Bengal, India.

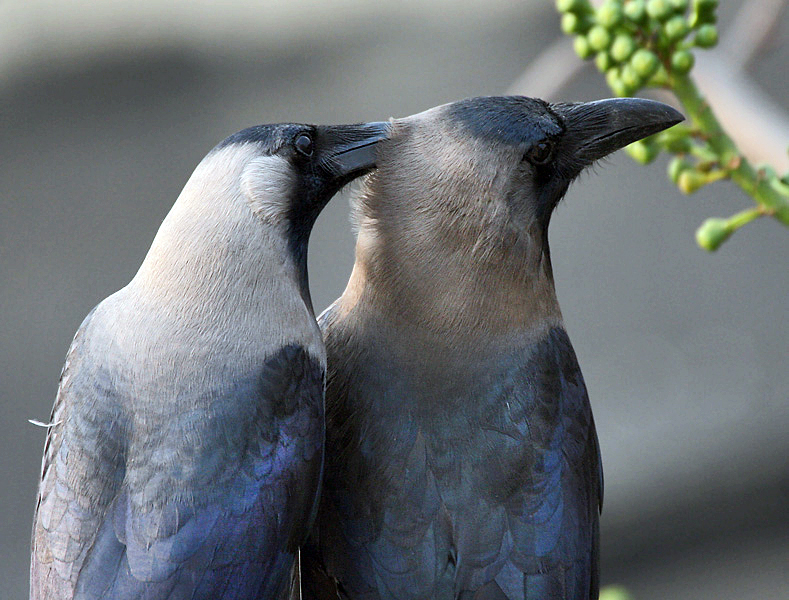
Grooming behaviour in India.

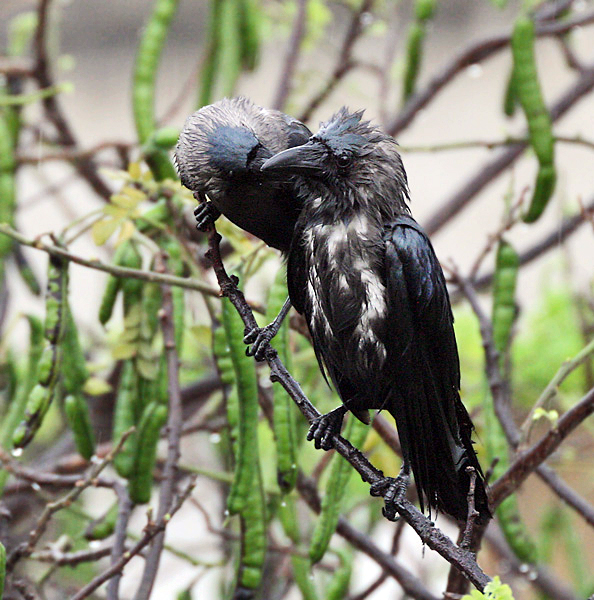
Grooming after bath in the rain in India.

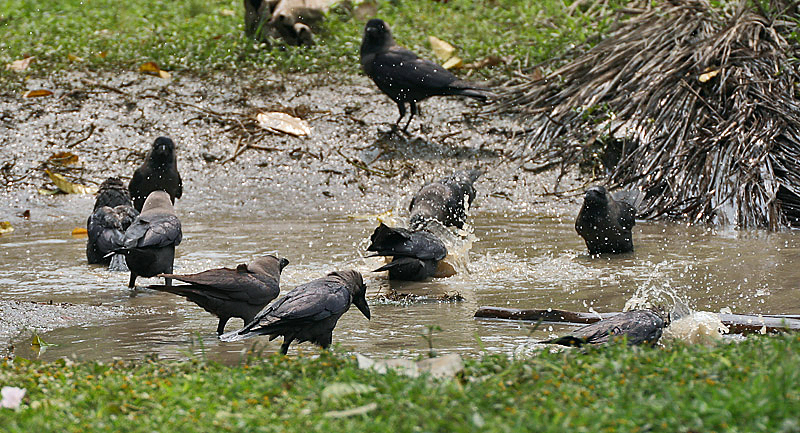
Bathing in India.

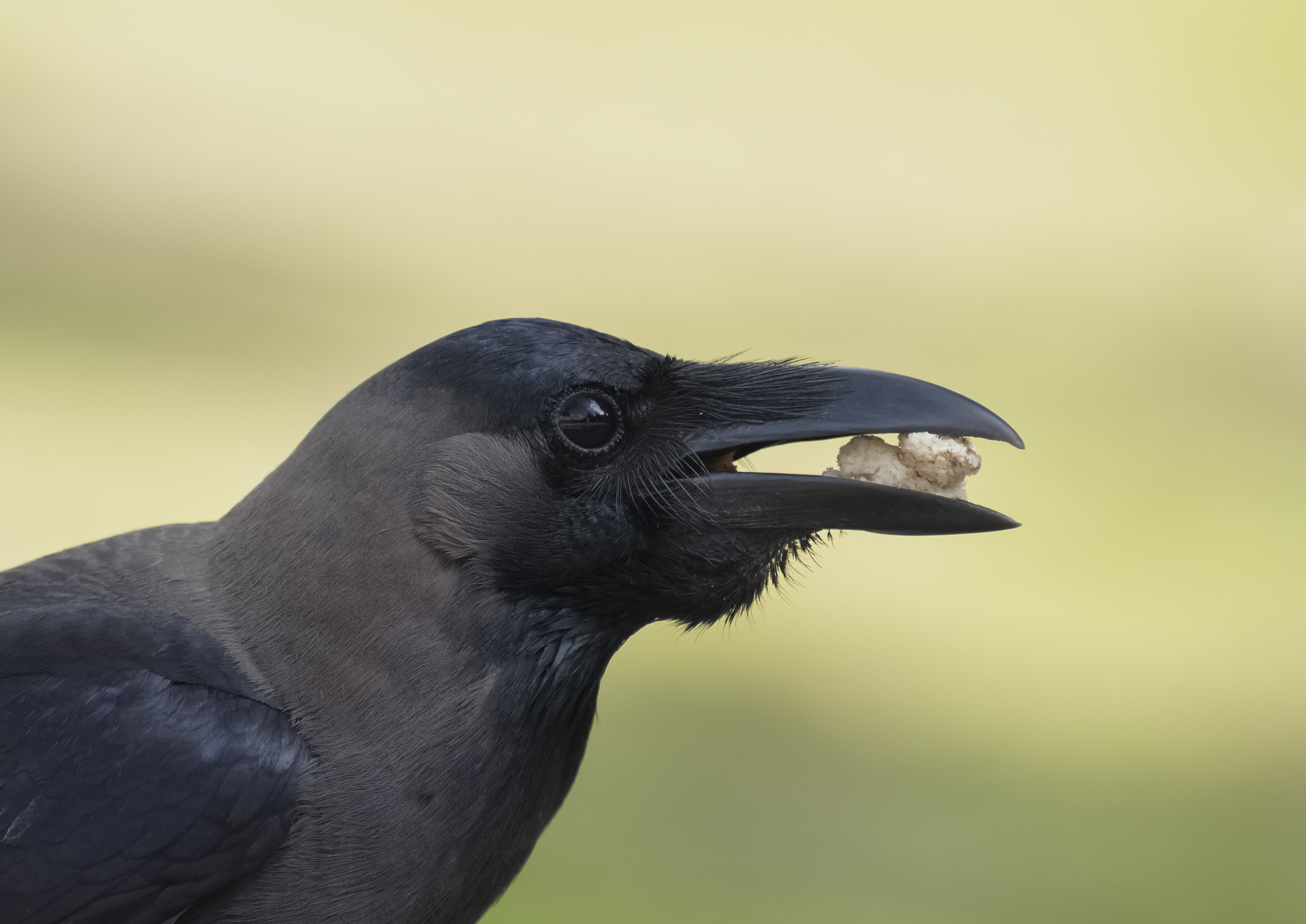
House Crow swallowing bread in Kuala Lumpur.

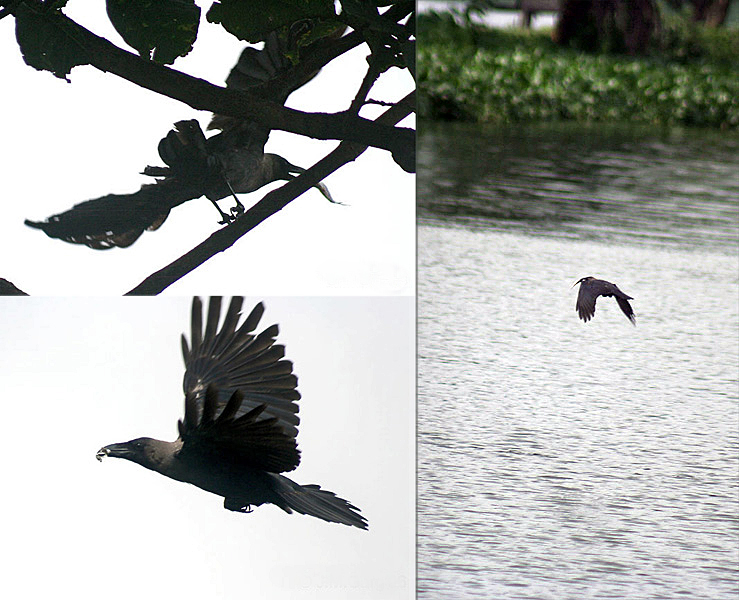
Eating fish

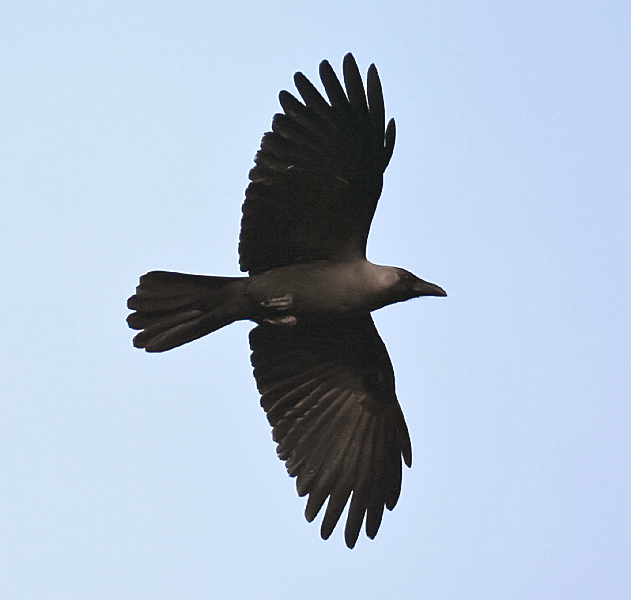
In flight in Kolkata, West Bengal, India.

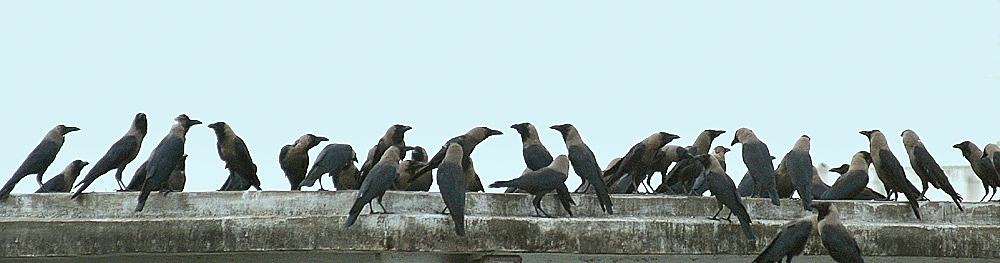
Assembling in the evening

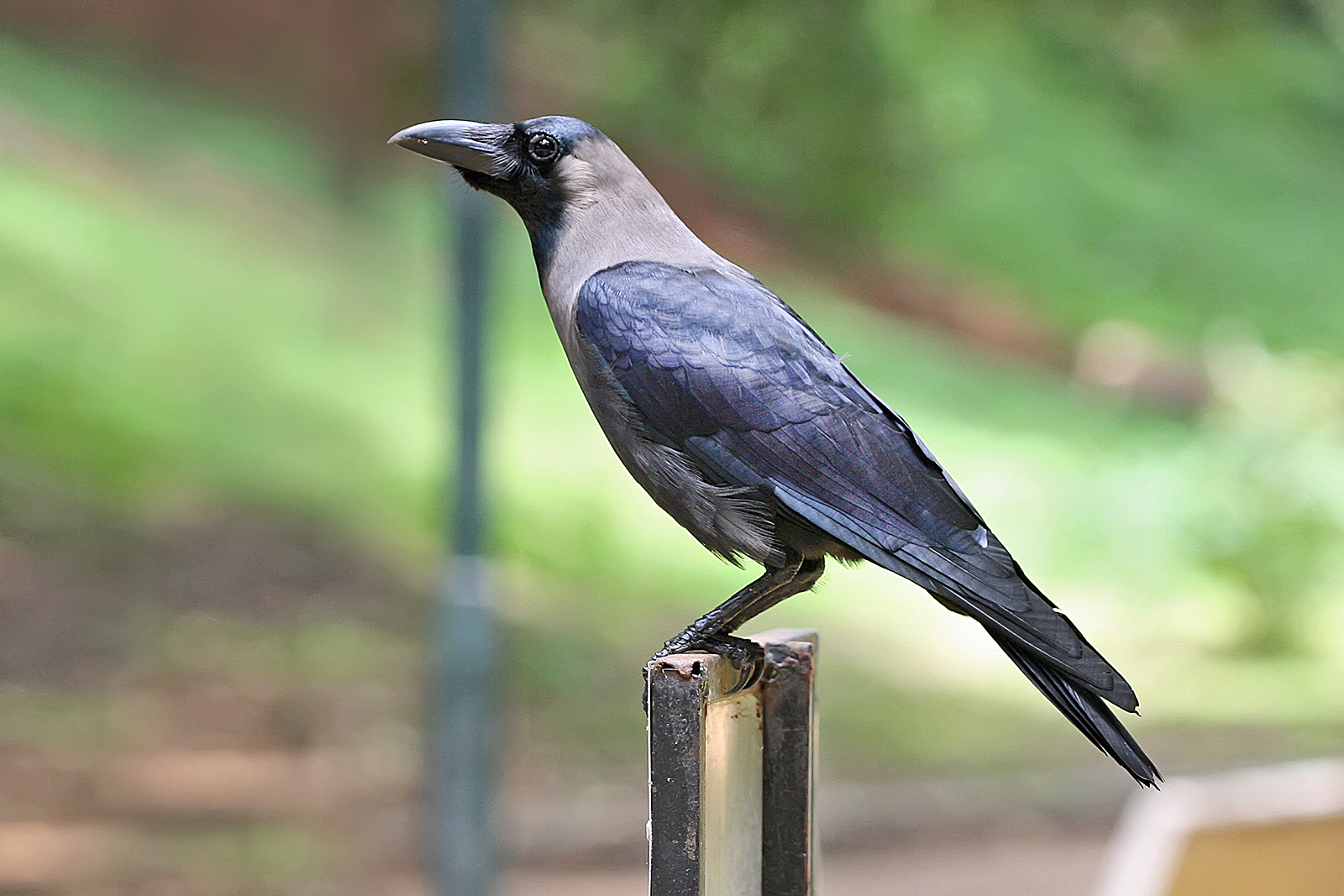
In Bengaluru, India

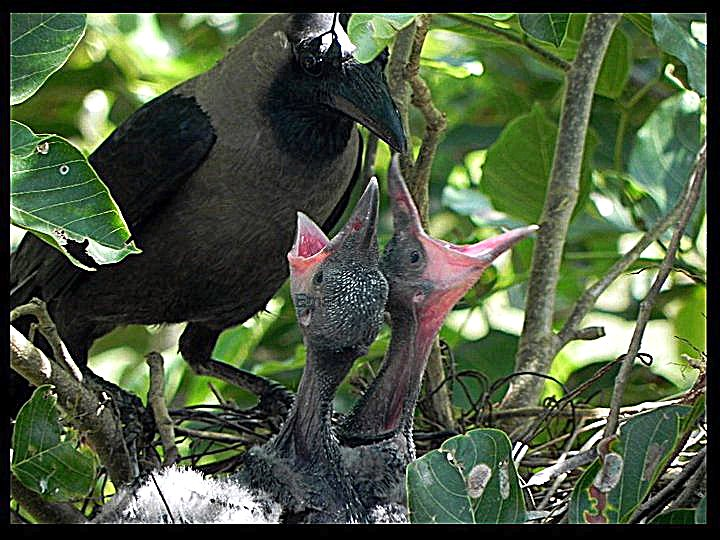
House crow feeding chicks in Chennai, India

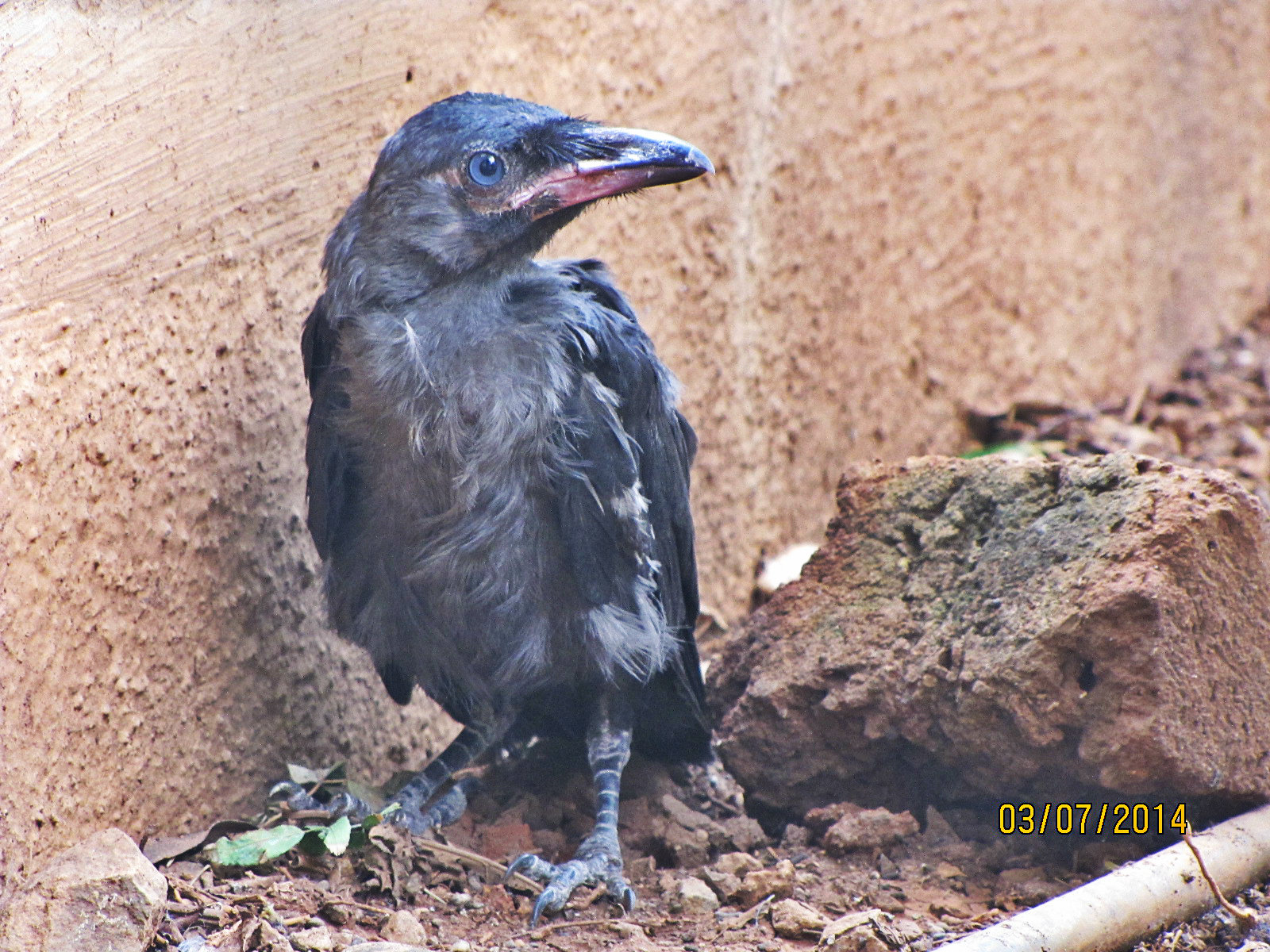
House crow fledgling

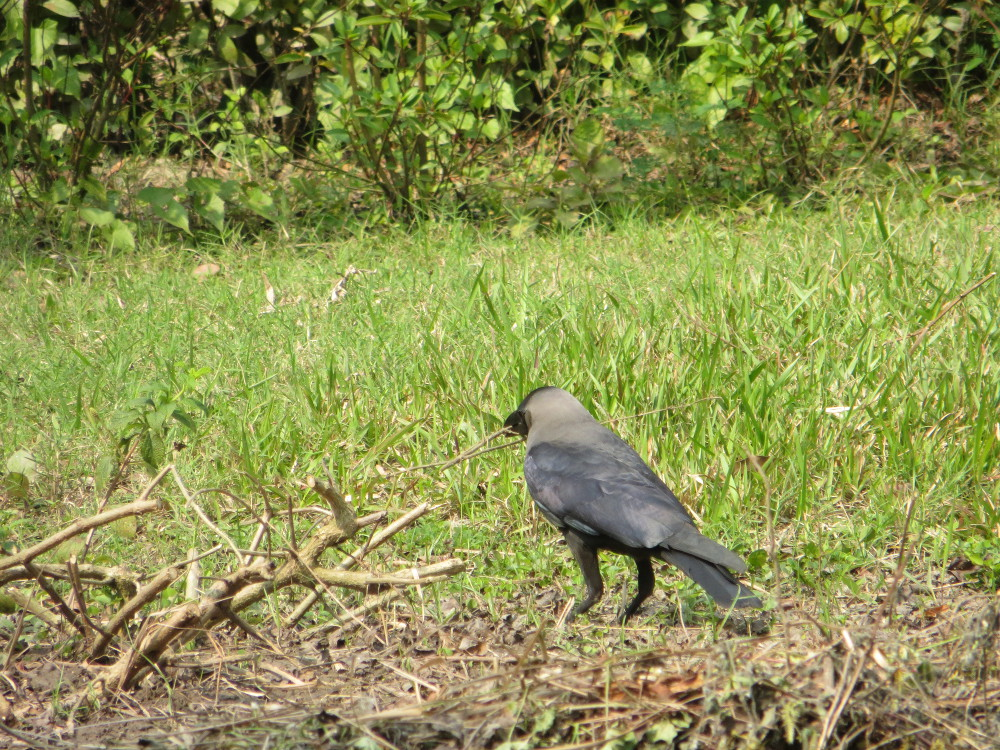
Collecting twigs for building a nest, Central Park (Kolkata)

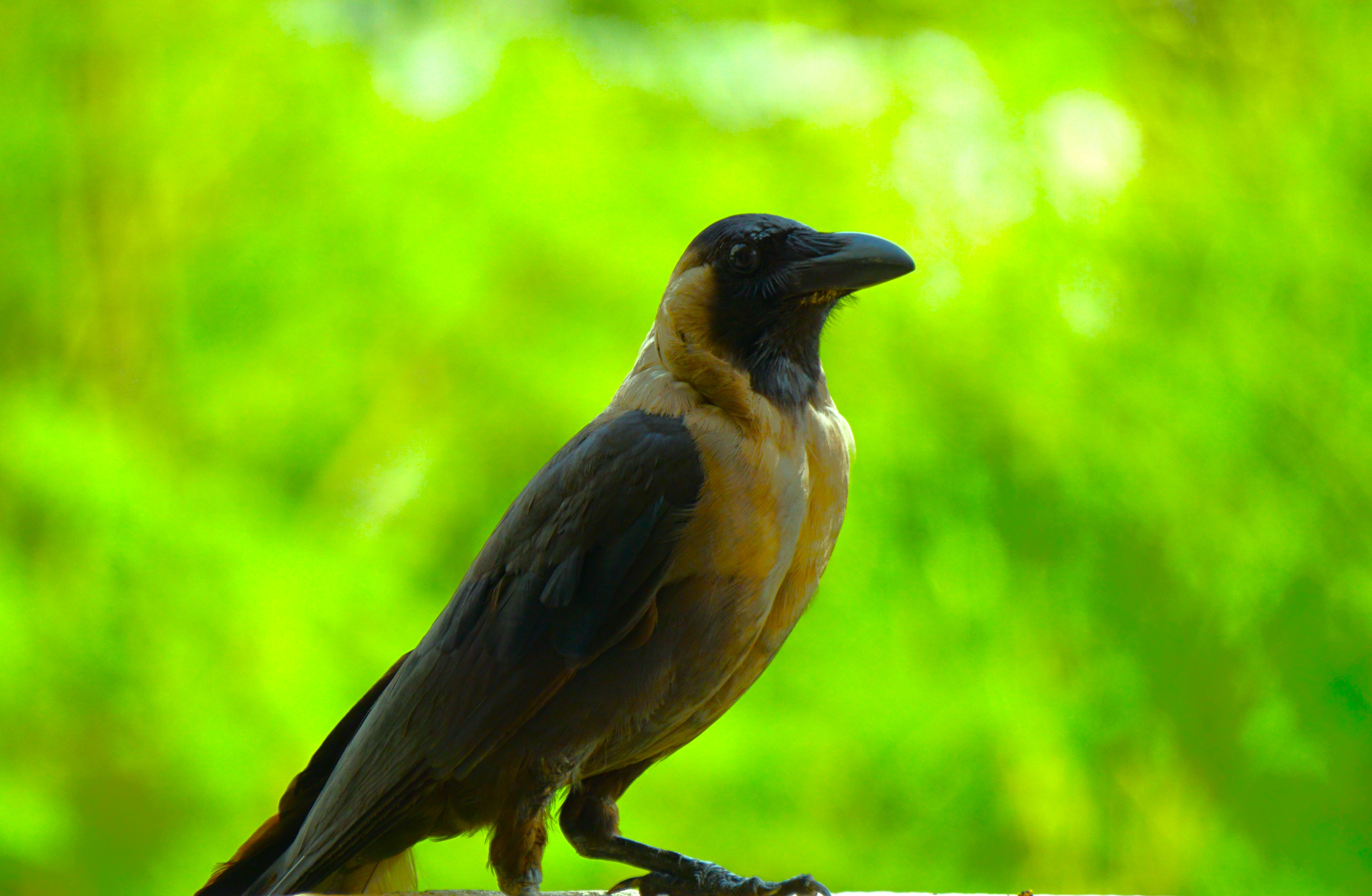
House Crow in Chennai, Tamil Nadu, India
