= Henry James Stovin Pryer =

British naturalist who worked in Japan

- Born: 10 June 1850; Middlesex
- Died: 17 February 1888 (aged 37); Yokohama, Japan
- Scientific career
- Fields: Entomology; Ornithology

Henry James Stovin Pryer (10 June 1850 - 17 February 1888) also known as Harry Pryer, was a British merchant and naturalist who worked in Japan. Pryer's special interest areas were entomology and ornithology. He was the younger brother of Isabel Thorne and William Burgess Pryer.

== Biography ==
Pryer's parents were Thomas Pryer, a Solicitor, and his wife Isabel (née Charlton), who were married on 2 June 1833. The couple had six children: Isabel Jane, Annette, Thomas Neremiah, William Burgess, Jessy Courtney and Henry James Stovin who was born on 10 June 1850 and baptised at Saint Paul's, Bunhill Row, Finsbury on 3 March 1851. At the time of Pryer's baptism his family lived at Artillery Place, Finsbury Square.

Pryer's father Thomas had died by 18 March 1851, as John Edmund Cox gave a sermon in Thomas' memory at St Helen's, Bishopsgate on that date. Isabel Pryer appears on the 1851 England Census, taken on the night of 30 March 1851, as a widow looking after her six children (including 9 month old Henry) with a live-in nurse and cook.

In 1856 Pryer's older sister Isabel Jane married Joseph Thorne, a Merchant who with his brother Augustus ran Thorne and Company, a textile trading business with links to Hong Kong and China. Isabel and Joseph Thorne would live in Shanghai, China for several years due to Joseph's work. Pryer's older brother William became a clerk working for Thorne and Company, and was also based in Shanghai. Following his siblings by travelling to Asia, Henry Pryer is described as first going to Japan in 1870 and is also recorded as a passenger travelling to Shanghai by steamship in February 1871.

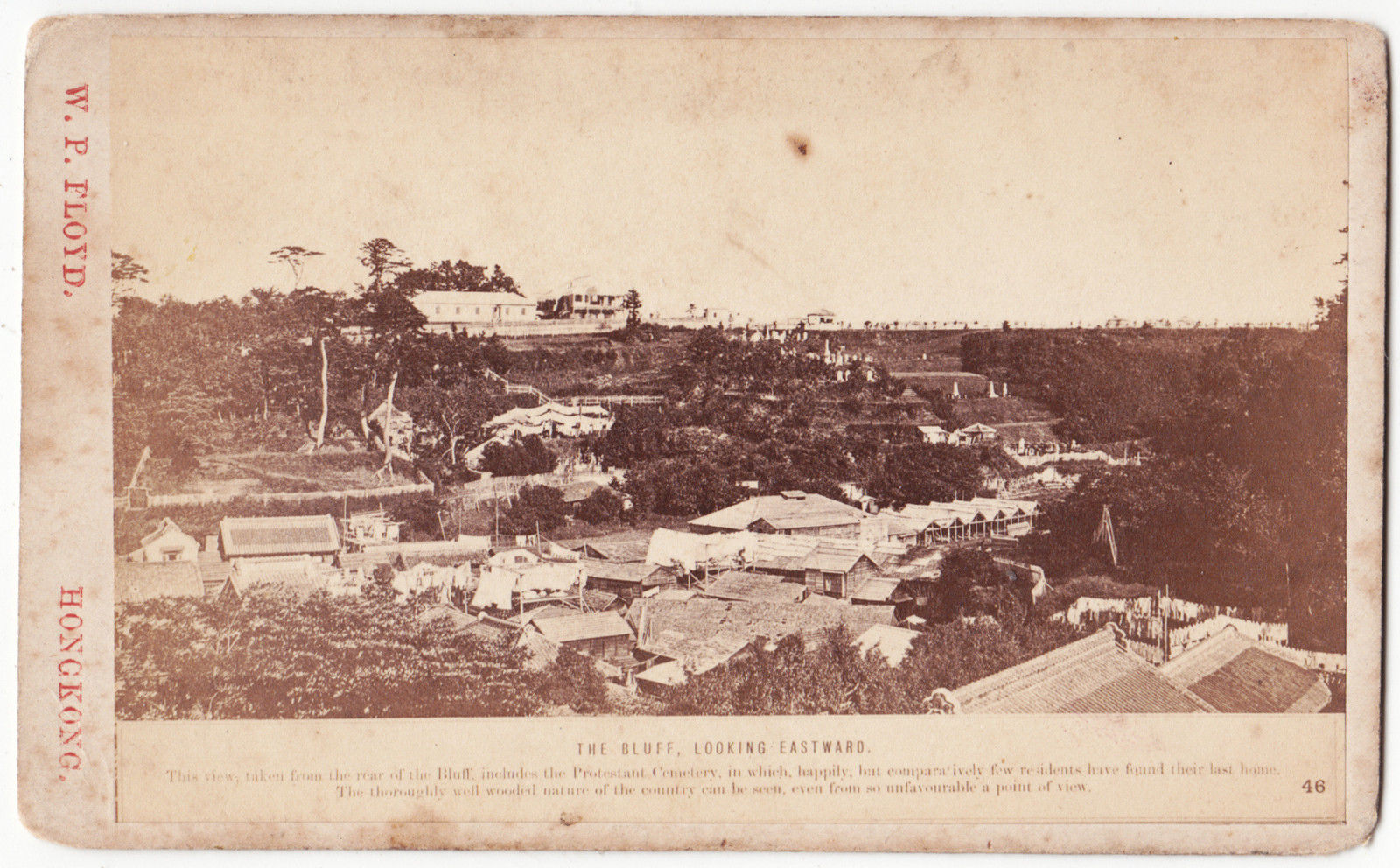
A carte-de-visite photograph of 'The Bluff, looking Eastwards, Yokohama' by W.P. Floyd of Hong Kong

By 1875 Pryer was living in Yokohama, Japan. He lived in a residence numbered 127 in "The Bluff", now Yamate District, once known as the gaikokujin kyoryūchi (foreign settlement). Pryer initially worked as a Clerk for Adamson, Bell and Company (later Dodwell & Co.), a company which traded tea and silk. In 1879 Pryer began working for a business named Bisset and Company.

Pryer was described as having a retiring but amiable disposition, and being a good friend to people who knew him well.

== As a naturalist ==
Pryer had become a member of the Entomological Society of London while still a teenager living in England, joining in 1867. Siblings Isabel and William had also shown interest in science from a young age, so Pryer had a supportive family.

While in Yokohama Pryer began to study and write about the local wildlife. Pryer was a supporter of Darwin's Theory of Evolution and tried to apply evolutionary theory to his own observations of nature. Pryer said in the introduction to his butterfly monograph Rhopalocera Nihonica that he had devoted 16 years (i.e. all the time he had been resident in Japan) to the study of butterflies from Japan's Islands. In the same volume Pryer gives his detailed methodology for collecting and preserving insect specimens - Pryer favoured the "Continental system" with insects being set flat and high on a long pin to avoid damage and accommodate labels underneath as opposed to the English system (using short pins) which he felt was 'a decided mistake.' Pryer also criticised entomologists who did not properly catalogue or label their collections: 'Most specimens have no intrinsic value; it is the facts concerning them which are of instruction and value.'

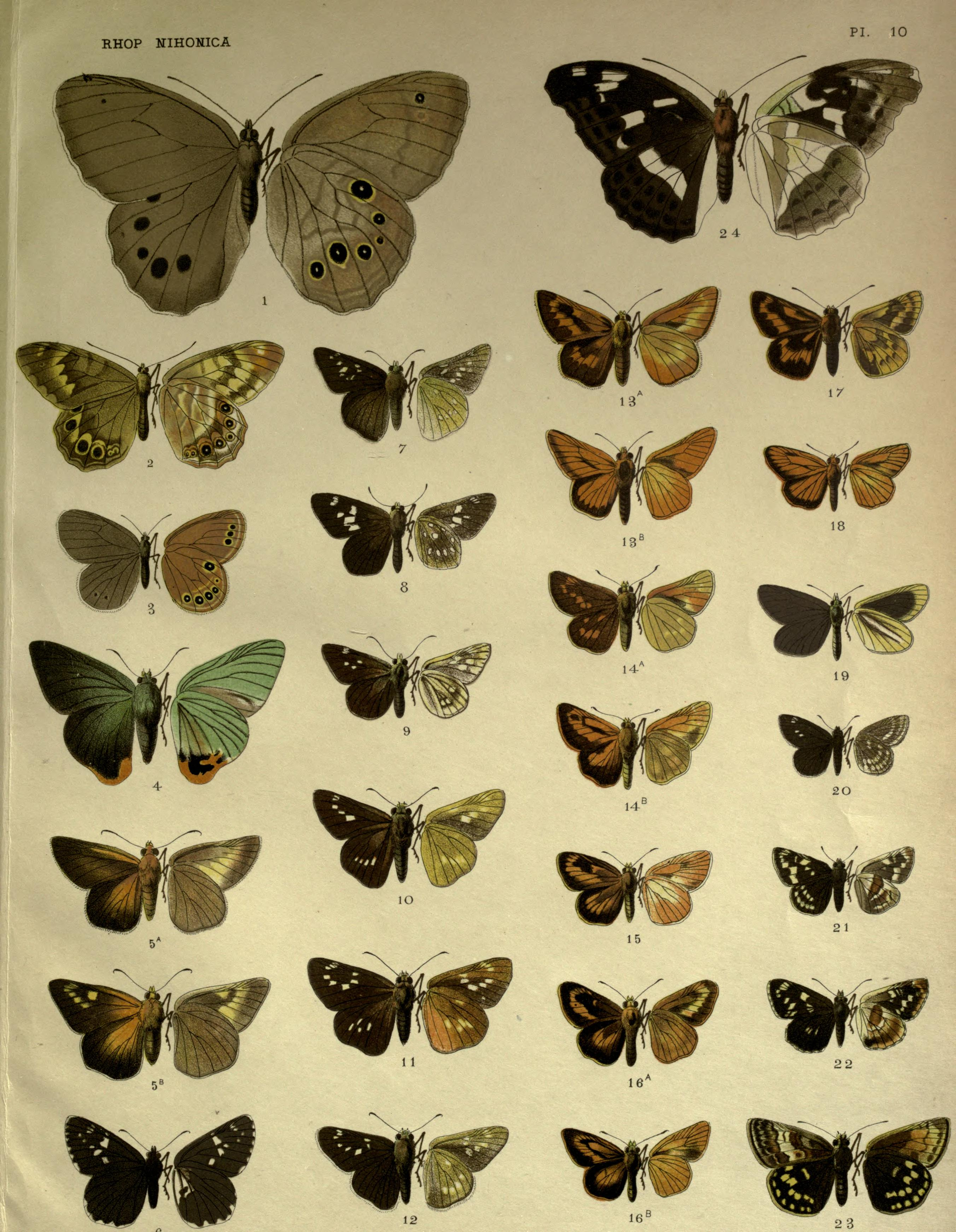
A plate from Pryer's book Rhopalocera nihonica

Pryer's butterfly collection included examples from all over Japan: he mentions studying specimens from Yokohama, Yezo [Ezo, northeast Honshu], Nagasaki, Tosa (southern Shikoku), Gifu Prefecture, Nikkō, Asama-yama (Mount Asama), Ohoyama, Tonosawa, Atami, Kanozan, Mount Fuji, Ontakisan (Mount Ontake), Yamato, Ogasawara, Ryukyu, possibly the Kuriles, Niigata, Ô-Yama, Chichibu, Usui-toge, Maibashi [Maebashi], Sonogi, Hachijo, Kanosan and Tokyo. Pryer's obituary in The Japan Weekly Mail notes that Pryer had a weak constitution, was not in the habit of collecting his own specimens and 'abstented from the healthy exercise of personally collecting specimens of natural history' because he instead concentrated on his business and studies. Pryer gives credit for some of his specimens to other collectors, including "Mr H. Loomis" (perhaps Henry Loomis, who was an American Missionary in Yokohama), "Fenton" of Tokyo (possibly John William Fenton), Mr Maries of Nikkō (probably Charles Maries), and a Mr Ota of Nagasaki.

In July 1873, via his sister Annette's husband Percy Wormald, Pryer communicated to the journal The Zoologist a report about his visit in March 1873 to see a dead giant squid that had been recovered by fishermen "off the coast of Kessarradzu, in Kadzuzar" [probably Kisarazu, Kazusa Province, now part of Chiba Prefecture]. Pryer took a measuring ruler with him and observed the squid to have had a body about 8 feet in length, with its longest arms being 6 feet long and its eyes having a diameter of 8 inches. Pryer also mentions that he had to light a cigar because by the time he visited the squid, which was being exhibited in a temple enclosure, the smell of 'bad fish' was very strong.

In 1878, with Thomas Blakiston, Pryer published a catalogue of the birds of Japan. The paper contains observations of bird habitat and behaviours, observed or compiled from correspondence by the authors, and the Japanese-language names for each species.

In 1879 Pryer was elected a Corresponding Member of the Zoological Society of London: in 1878 he had sent a living "Japanese Wild Dog" to the Zoological Society's menagerie, although a contemporary Zoo catalogue suggests there was a question mark as to how wild it actually was. In 1879, Pryer sent the Society a living male example of the Japanese serow Capricornis crispus, the first time the living species had been seen in the U.K. The serow was described as suffering in confinement on its long voyage to England, losing weight, and being aggressive with a companion animal placed in its enclosure when it first arrived at the zoo, though it improved in health after some time.

== Sickness and death ==
Pryer contracted bronchial pneumonia and died at his home in Yokohama on 17 February 1888 after 12 days.

== Legacy ==
John Henry Leech purchased most of Pryer's entomological collections after Pryer's death. Leech's collection of palearctic butterflies, including Pryer's Japanese material, was gifted to the British Museum by Leech's mother Eliza after Leech died in 1900.

A specimen of the crested ibis (Nipponia nippon), which had belonged to Pryer, then Henry Seebohm, and is now part of the collection of the Natural History Museum (specimen NHMUK:1897.10.30.4), was examined as part of a molecular study using museum specimens to study the historic genetics of the species compared with the current living population now that the species is critically endangered.

In 2018 on Pryer's birthday June 10, local historians led by Kiyoshi Miura held a graveside ceremony at Pryer's memorial in Yokohama Foreign General Cemetery to honour Pryer's contribution to natural history research.

== Select publications ==
- Pryer, H.: 'A Large Squid exhibited in Japan' The Zoologist, July 1873, pages 3591-3593 (1873)
- Blakiston, T. & Pryer, H.: 'A Catalogue of the Birds of Japan.' The Ibis, fourth series, number VII, pages 209-250 (July 1878)
- Pryer, H.: Rhopalocera nihonica: a description of the butterflies of Japan. (1886-1889) [published in three parts, the last two parts being published posthumously - part 1, part II, part III]
