= Nam Cheong West (constituency) =

Hong Kong constituency

- Elected constituency for the Sham Shui Po District Council
- Boundary of Nam Cheong West in Sham Shui Po District
- District: Sham Shui Po
- Legislative Council constituency: Kowloon West
- Population: 20,211 (2019)
- Electorate: 8,569 (2019)

Current constituency
- Created: 1994
- Number of members: One
- Member: Vacant

Nam Cheong West (Chinese: 南昌西) is one of the 25 constituencies in the Sham Shui Po District of Hong Kong which was created in 1994.

The constituency loosely covers Nam Cheong Estate with an estimated population of 20,211.

== Councillors represented ==
| Election | Member | Party |
|---|---|---|
| 1994 | Wai Woon-nam→Vacant | ADPL |

== Election results ==
=== 2010s ===
Sham Shui Po District Council Election, 2019: Nam Cheong West
| Party | Candidate | Votes | % | ±% |
|---|---|---|---|---|
| ADPL | Wai Woon-nam | 3,573 | 63.27 | +2.66 |
| Nonpartisan | Navis Ha Wing-ka | 2,074 | 36.73 | |
| Majority | | 1,499 | 26.54 | |
| Turnout | | 5,677 | 66.29 | |
| ADPL hold | | Swing | | |

Sham Shui Po District Council Election, 2015: Nam Cheong West
| Party | Candidate | Votes | % | ±% |
|---|---|---|---|---|
| ADPL | Wai Woon-nam | 1,873 | 60.61 | −6.54 |
| Independent | Heung Ming-hau | 1,217 | 39.39 | |
| Majority | | 656 | 21.22 | |
| Turnout | | 3,090 | 41.16 | |
| ADPL hold | | Swing | | |

Sham Shui Po District Council Election, 2011: Nam Cheong West
| Party | Candidate | Votes | % | ±% |
|---|---|---|---|---|
| ADPL | Wai Woon-nam | 1,629 | 67.15 | −9.59 |
| FTU (DAB) | Chan Kin-man | 797 | 32.85 | |
| Majority | | 832 | 34.30 | |
| Turnout | | 2,426 | 40.59 | |
| ADPL hold | | Swing | | |

=== 2000s ===
Sham Shui Po District Council Election, 2007: Nam Cheong West
| Party | Candidate | Votes | % | ±% |
|---|---|---|---|---|
| ADPL | Wai Woon-nam | 1,514 | 76.74 | −3.14 |
| Independent | Kwok Tak-leung | 459 | 23.26 | |
| Majority | | 1,055 | 53.48 | |
| ADPL hold | | Swing | | |

=== 2000s ===
Sham Shui Po District Council Election, 2003: Nam Cheong West
| Party | Candidate | Votes | % | ±% |
|---|---|---|---|---|
| ADPL | Wai Woon-nam | 1,910 | 79.88 | +4.19 |
| FTU (DAB) | Chan Siu-ping | 481 | 20.18 | −4.19 |
| Majority | | 1,429 | 59.70 | |
| ADPL hold | | Swing | | |

=== 1990s ===
Sham Shui Po District Council Election, 1999: Nam Cheong West
| Party | Candidate | Votes | % | ±% |
|---|---|---|---|---|
| ADPL | Wai Woon-nam | 1,750 | 75.63 | +10.86 |
| DAB | Li Sze-hung | 564 | 24.37 | |
| Majority | | 1,186 | 51.26 | |
| ADPL hold | | Swing | | |

Sham Shui Po District Board Election, 1994: Nam Cheong West
| Party | Candidate | Votes | % | ±% |
|---|---|---|---|---|
| ADPL | Wai Woon-nam | 1,388 | 64.77 | |
| 123DA | Au Yeung Lun | 755 | 35.23 | |
| Majority | | 633 | 9.54 | |
| ADPL win (new seat) | | | | |
