= Bai Lang =

Bai Lang or Bailang may refer to:

- Chang An-lo (born 1948), a.k.a. Bai Lang (White Wolf), a Taiwanese gangster
- Bai Lang Rebellion (1911–1914), rebellion against Yuan Shikai
- Pai-lang language, or Bailang, earliest recorded Tibeto-Burman language
- Bailang County, Tibet Autonomous Region, China
- Bailang, Zixing, a town of Zixing City, Hunan
