= Nam Cheong Estate =

Public housing estate in Sham Shui Po, Hong Kong

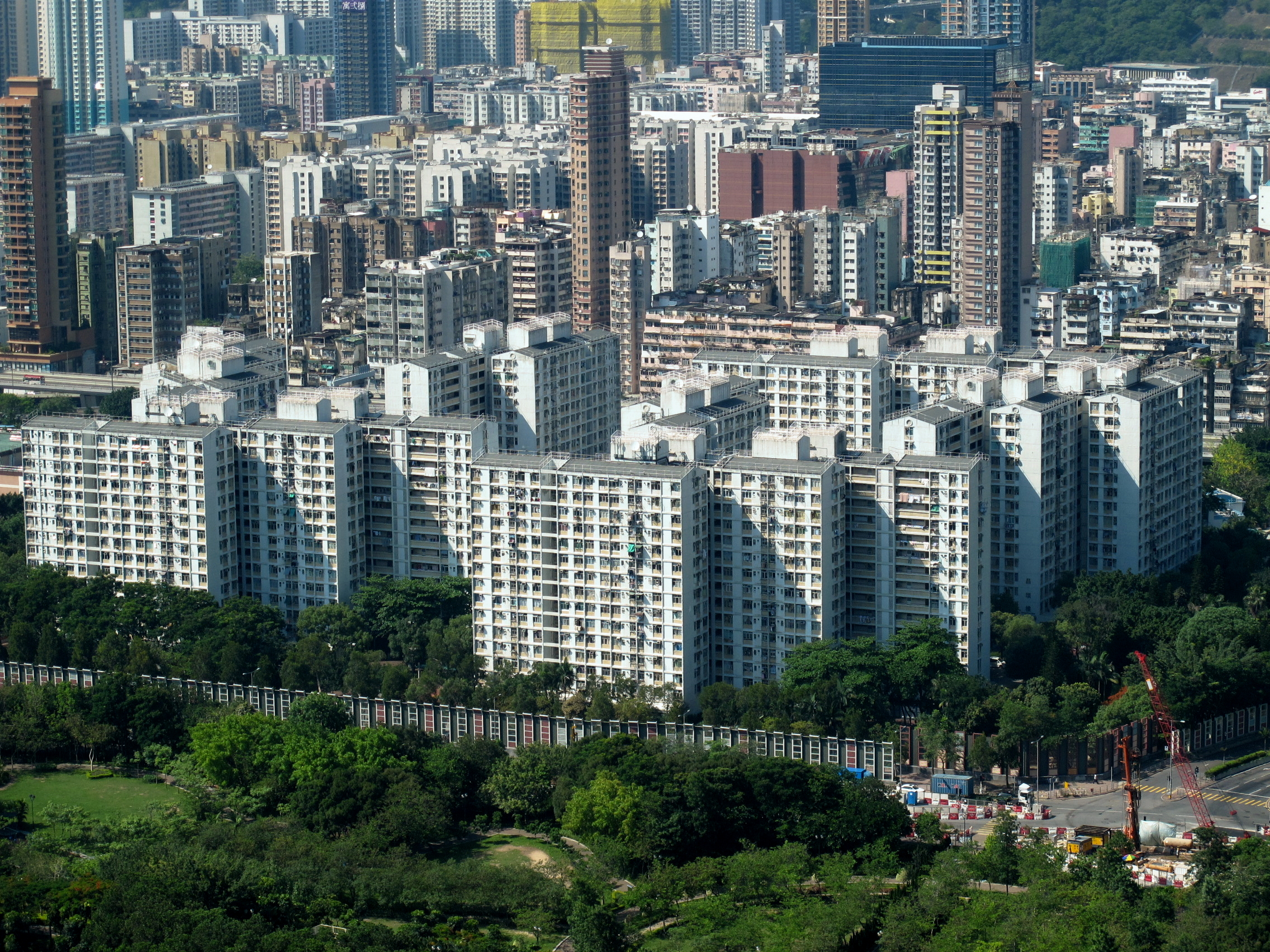
- Nam Cheong Estate
- Interactive map of Nam Cheong Estate

General information
- Location: 3 Cheong San Lane, Sham Shui Po; Kowloon, Hong Kong
- Coordinates: 22.3262°N 114.1575°E
- Status: Completed
- Category: Public rental housing
- Population: 4,847 (2016)
- No. of blocks: 7
- No. of units: 1,898

Construction
- Constructed: 1989; 37 years ago
- Authority: Hong Kong Housing Authority

Nam Cheong Estate (Chinese: 南昌邨) is a public housing estate in Sham Shui Po, Kowloon, Hong Kong near Nam Cheong Park, Tung Chau Street Park and MTR Nam Cheong station. It is named from nearby Nam Cheong Street, a main street in Sham Shui Po District. It consists of seven residential blocks completed in 1989. In 2005, the estate was sold to tenants through Tenants Purchase Scheme Phase 6B.

== Houses ==
Name	Chinese name	Building type	Completed
Cheong Him House	昌謙樓	Linear 1	1989
Cheong On House	昌安樓	Linear 1	1989
Cheong Shun House	昌遜樓	Linear 3	1989
Cheong Yat House	昌逸樓	Linear 3	1989
Cheong Chit House	昌哲樓	Linear 3	1989
Cheong Chung House	昌頌樓	Linear 3	1989
Cheong Yin House	昌賢樓	Linear 3	1989

== Demographics ==
According to the 2016 by-census, Nam Cheong Estate had a population of 4,847. The median age was 48.9 and the majority of residents (96.8 per cent) were of Chinese ethnicity. The average household size was 2.6 people. The median monthly household income of all households (i.e. including both economically active and inactive households) was HK$22,000.

== Politics ==
Nam Cheong Estate is located in Nam Cheong West constituency of the Sham Shui Po District Council. It was formerly represented by Wai Woon-nam, who was elected in the 2019 elections until July 2021.

== COVID-19 pandemic ==
Cheong Him House and Cheong Yat House at Nam Cheong Estate were placed under lockdown for mandatory covid test.

== See also ==
- Public housing estates in Sham Shui Po
