= Bai Di =

Bai Di may refer to:

- Baidicheng (白帝), ancient temple complex on a hill on the northern shore of the Yangtze River in China
- White Di or Bai Di (白狄), a subgroup of the Northern Di people
