= Bai Bing =

Bai Bing may refer to:

- Michelle Bai (born 1986), Chinese actress and singer
- Pai Bing-bing, also known as Bai Bingbing (born 1955), Taiwanese singer, actress, media personality and social activist
