= Bai, Nepal =

Wai, Nepal वाई
- Village development committee
- Location in Nepal
- Coordinates: 29.48°N 81.76°E
- Country: Nepal
- Zone: Seti Zone
- District: Bajura District

Population (1991)
  - Total: 2,878
  - Religions: Hindu
- Time zone: UTC+5:45 (Nepal Time)

Wai is a village in Bajura District in the Seti Zone of north-western Nepal. At the time of the 1991 Nepal census it had a population of 2,878 and had 551 houses in the village.
