= Tung Chau Street Park =

Public park in Sham Shui Po, Hong Kong

Coordinates: 22°19′33″N 114°09′34″E

- 通州街公園
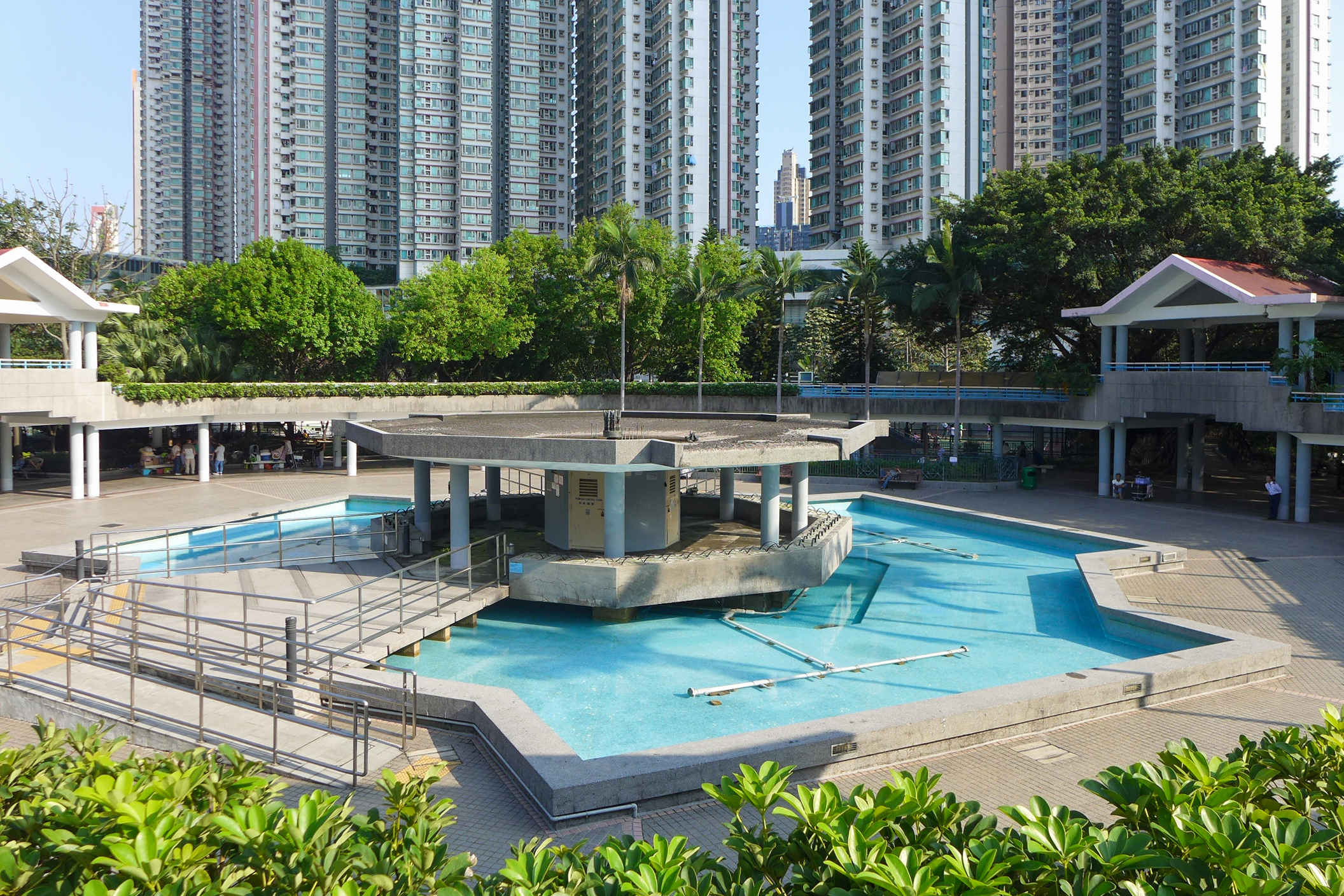
- Abandoned fountain in Park Plaza in April 2017
- Interactive map of Tung Chau Street Park
- Location: Sham Shui Po, Kowloon
- Area: 5.5 hectares (14 acres)
- Opened: 29 October 1989; 36 years ago
- Operator: Leisure and Cultural Services Department
- Public transit: Nam Cheong station (250 m)

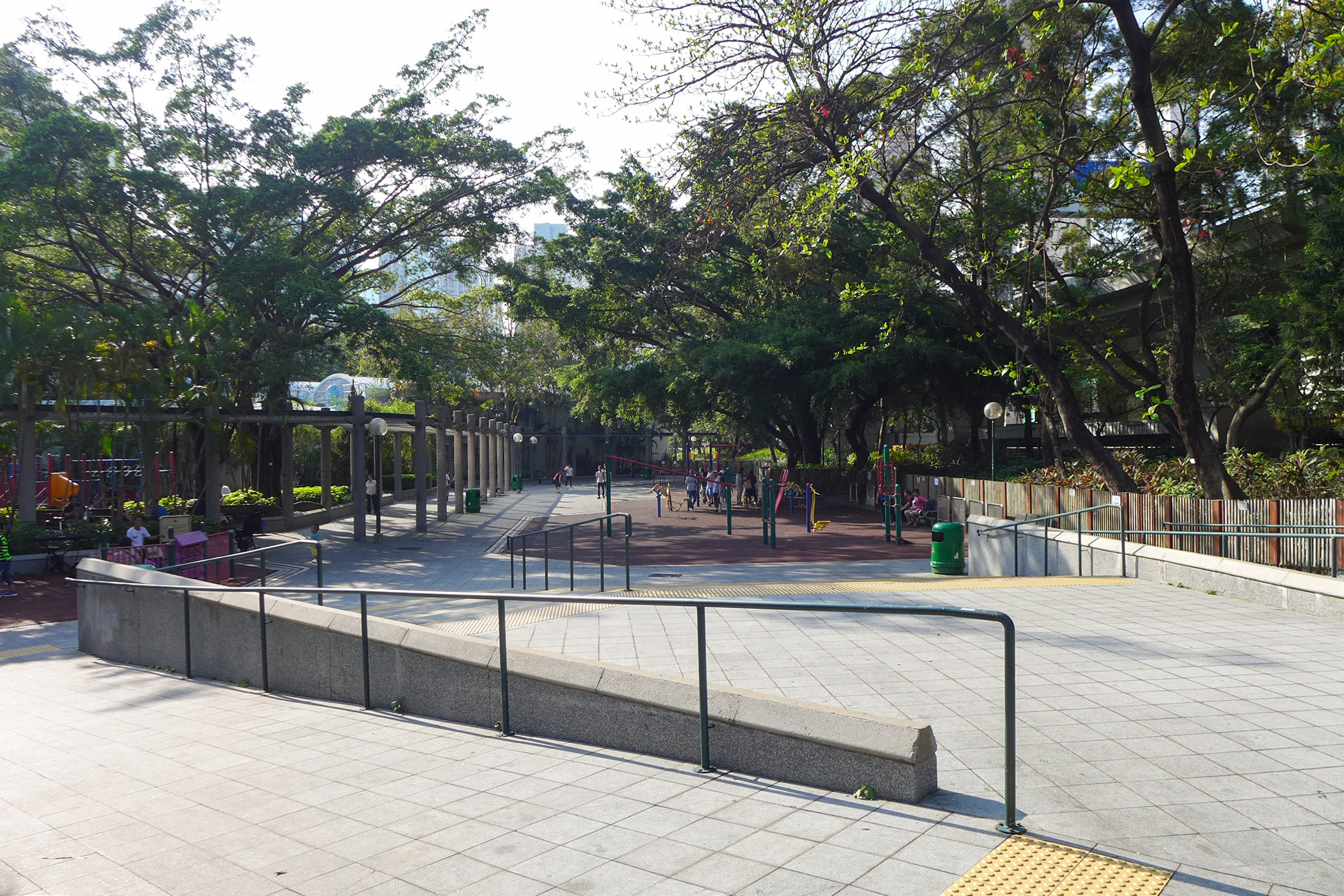
Children's playground in April 2017

Tung Chau Street Park (Chinese: 通州街公園) is an urban public park in Sham Shui Po, Kowloon, Hong Kong, around the Nam Cheong Estate. It was built as a joint venture between the Urban Council and the Housing Department. The park opened on 29 October 1989 and occupies 5.5 hectares (14 acres). It is across the street from Nam Cheong Park, another sizable park.

== History ==
The Urban Council held a formal opening ceremony at the park on 21 April 1990, attended by urban councillors Tong Kam-biu and Ronnie Wong.

== Features ==
- Basketball courts (2)
- Central piazza
- Children's play area
- Football pitch (5-a-side)
- Indoor games hall
  - Activity room
  - Squash courts (5)
- Mini football pitch
- Ornamental lake
- Tennis courts (5)
- Toilets and showers

== See also ==
- List of urban public parks and gardens in Hong Kong
