= BAI (file format) =

File format

BAI, or the BAI file format, is a file format for performing electronic cash management balance reporting. The BAI format was developed and previously maintained by the Bank Administration Institute (BAI). One common application of the BAI format is for use by banks to transmit returned item data to customers (for example, checks which have been marked insufficient funds (NSF)). The current release is Cash Management Balance Reporting Specifications Version 2, typically referred to as BAI2.

== History ==
In 1971, BAI created a precursor to the BAI format called the Lockbox Communications Standards for Banks, which supported reporting only for lockbox services. This standard was never updated and was eventually superseded by the BAI format.

In 1980, BAI, working with various U.S. banks, released BAI1, the Cash Management Balance Reporting Specification, Version 1, the first release of cash management balance reporting specifications. Some banks still use BAI1, but BAI discontinued formal support after 1990.

In 1987, the original specifications were replaced by BAI2.

In 2001, the BAI2 specifications were updated to include new codes for lending transactions.

Since the user base of the BAI format has reached critical mass and is considered self-supporting, BAI no longer actively supports (or charges for) the BAI format specifications, which are now freely available as a 104-page PDF document (see the external link below to the "Cash Management Balance Reporting Specifications").

The Society for Worldwide Interbank Financial Telecommunication (SWIFT) is the international financial industry messaging cooperative that maintains the official list of worldwide currency codes as used with BAI2. Appendix B of the BAI2 specifications mirrors the list as of June 2005.

In 2008, the Bank Administration Institute transferred copyright ownership of the BAI file format to the Accredited Standards Committee X9, Inc. - Financial Industry Standards (ASC X9). As of early 2009, the document is being revised by an X9 committee of bankers and corporate members to become an American National Standard. ASC X9 has been accredited to develop American National Standards for the financial services industry since 1984.
