= Nam Cheong Park =

Park in Sham Shui Po, Hong Kong

Coordinates: 22.3241°N 114.1573°E

- 南昌公園
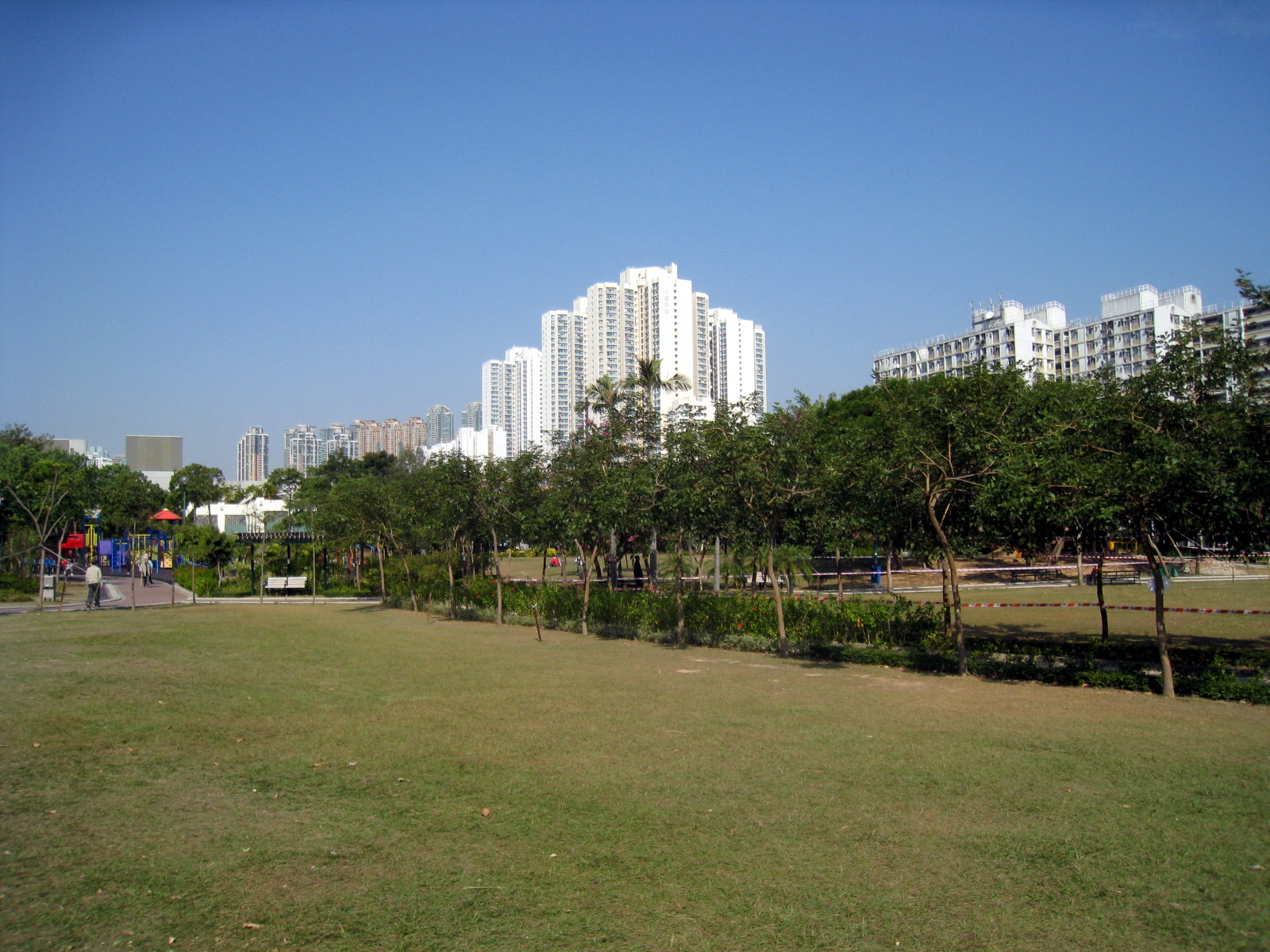
- View of lawns
- Type: Public park
- Location: Sham Shui Po, Hong Kong
- Area: 3.83 hectares (9.5 acres)
- Opened: July 1998; 28 years ago
- Operator: Leisure and Cultural Services Department
- Open: Year round, 24 hours
- Public transit: Nam Cheong station

The Nam Cheong Park is an urban park in the Sham Shui Po area of Kowloon, Hong Kong. The park is managed by the Leisure and Cultural Services Department. It is located near Nam Cheong station, Nam Cheong Estate, and Tung Chau Street Park. The park is bordered by Sham Mong Road in the east, Hoi Fai Road in the south, Lin Cheung Road to the west, and Yen Chow Street to the north.

== History ==
The park is built on land reclaimed in the 1990s as part of the Airport Core Programme. The site was zoned "District Open Space" to act as a buffer zone between Nam Cheong Estate and the West Kowloon Highway. This is similar to Lai Chi Kok Park, which acts as a buffer zone between the highway and Mei Foo Sun Chuen, which was developed at the same time. The park opened in July 1998.

In the early 2000s, half the park was occupied by West Rail line construction. More recently much of the park has been occupied by temporary works areas for the Express Rail Link.

== Features ==
- Children's playground
- Fitness equipment for elderly persons
- Lawns
- Toilets
- Running track

== See also ==
- List of urban public parks and gardens in Hong Kong
