= Bai Prefecture =

Historical administrative division in Guangxi, China

Bai Prefecture (白州) Nanchang Commandery (南昌郡)
- Population
  - 740s or 750s: 9,498
  - 1070s or 1080s: Unknown, 4,589 households
- History
  - Preceded by: Nan Prefecture (南州)
  - Created: 623 (Tang dynasty)
  - Abolished: 1136 (Song dynasty)
- Contained within
  - Circuit: Tang dynasty: Lingnan Circuit; Song dynasty: Guangnan Circuit; Guangnan West Circuit

Bai Prefecture
- Chinese: 白州
Transcriptions
Standard Mandarin
- Hanyu Pinyin: Bái Zhōu

Nanchang Commandery
- Chinese: 南昌郡
Transcriptions
Standard Mandarin
- Hanyu Pinyin: Nánchāng Jùn

Baizhou or Bai Prefecture was a zhou (prefecture) in imperial China in modern southern Guangxi, China. It existed intermittently from 623 to 1136, and between 742 and 758 it was known as Nanchang Commandery.

== Counties ==
Bai Prefecture administered the following counties (縣) through history:

- Bobai (博白), roughly modern Bobai County.
- Nanchang (南昌)
- Jianning (建寧)
- Zhouluo (周羅)

Nanchang, Jianning, and Zhouluo, all abolished by the Song dynasty in 972, are probably all in modern Bobai County.
