= Bai Island =

Island in Malaysia

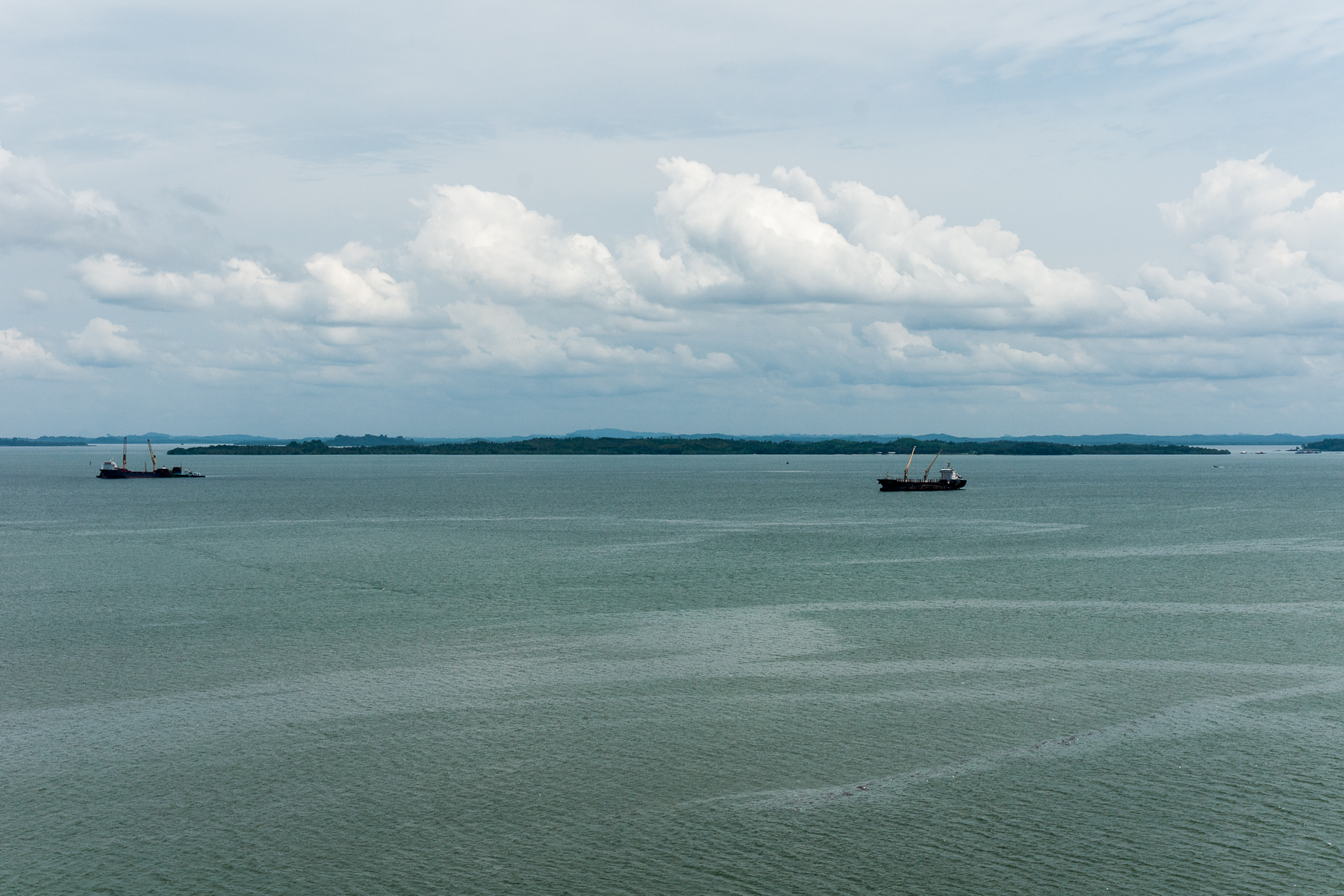
- View of Bai Island from Harbour Mall
- Interactive map of Bai Island

Geography
- Coordinates: 5°46′34.3″N 118°6′17.6″E

Administration
- Malaysia
- State: Sabah
- Division: Sandakan
- District: Sandakan

Bai Island (Malay: Pulau Bai) is an island located near Sandakan in the Sandakan Division, Sabah, Malaysia. It is also known as a perfect place for fishing.

== See also ==
- List of islands of Malaysia
