= List of endangered species in Missouri =

This is a list of species named endangered by the Missouri Department of Conservation, which are not necessarily on the U.S. Endangered Species List. It is not comprehensive.

== Invertebrates ==
- Nicrophorus americanus, American burying beetle
- Fusconaia ebena, ebonyshell mussel
- Elliptio crassidens, elephant ear mussel
- Lampsilis abrupta, pink mucket mussel
- Leptodea leptodon, scaleshell mussel
- Plethobasus cyphyus, sheepnose, or bullhead mussel
- Epioblasma triquetra, snuffbox mussel
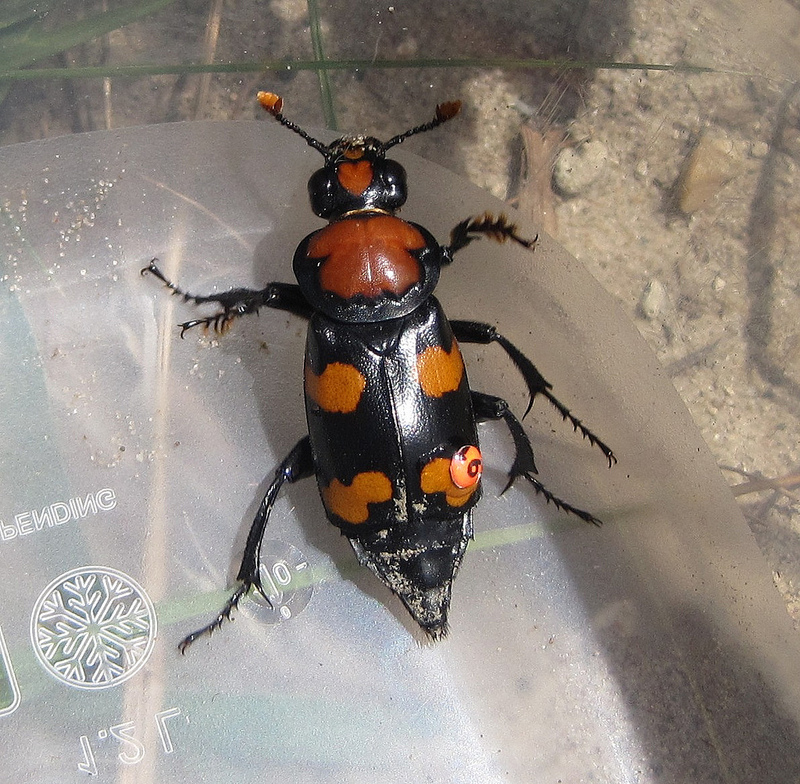
Both parents of Nicrophorus americanus care for their young.

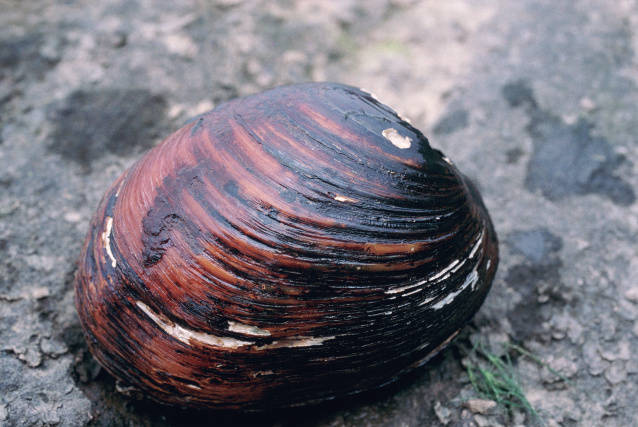
The pink mucket

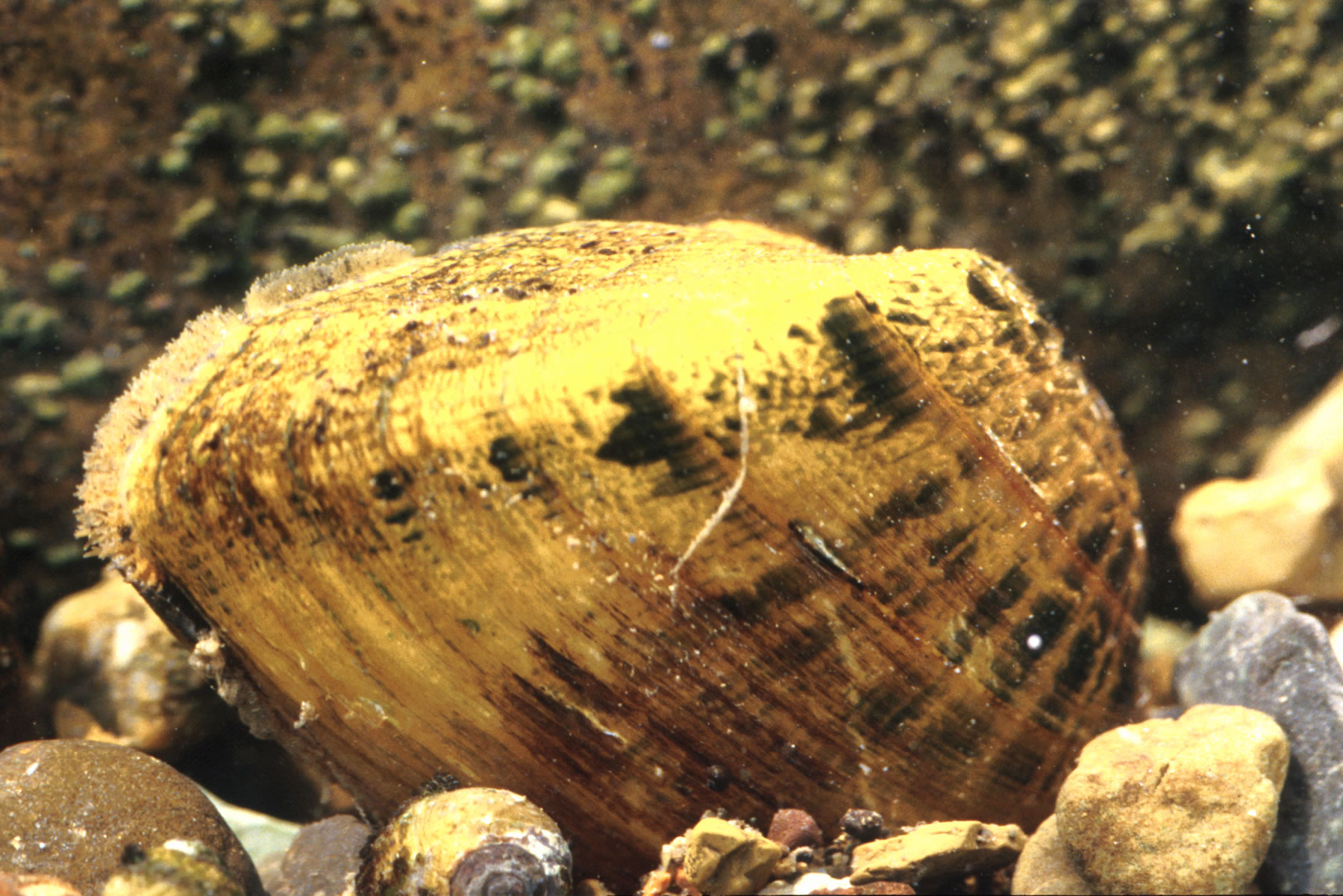
Snuffboxes are pending federal protection.

== Vertebrates ==
=== Birds ===
- Aimophila aestivalis, Bachmann's sparrow
- Tympanuchus cupido, greater prairie chicken
- Sternula antillarum, least tern
- Falco peregrinus, peregrine falcon, currently being reintroduced to the state in urban areas.

=== Reptiles ===
- Emydoidea blandingii, Blanding's turtle
- Sistrurus tergeminus tergeminus, the prairie massasauga rattlesnake, a subspecies of the western massasauga, which is a genus of venomous rattlesnakes.
- Deirochelys reticularia miaria, western chicken turtle
- Kinosternon flavescens flavescens, yellow mud turtle
- Nerodia cyclopion, Mississippi green watersnake

=== Amphibians ===
- Cryptobranchus alleganiensis, hellbender

=== Fish ===
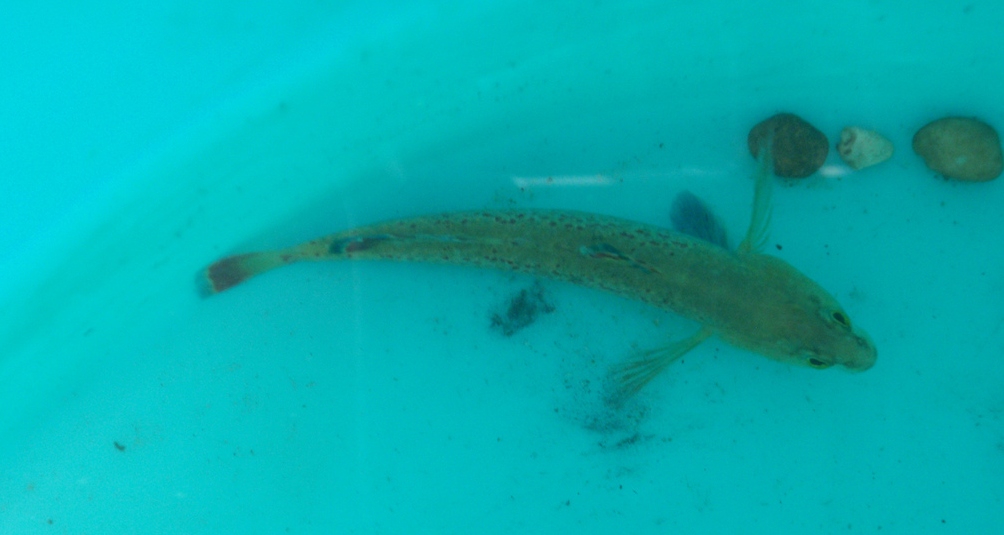
A redfin darter captured in a tank at the Natchitoches National Fish Hatchery.

- Umbra limi, central mudminnow
- Crystallaria asprella, crystal darter
- Hybognathus hayi, cypress minnow
- Platygobio gracilis, flathead chub
- Etheostoma parvipinne, goldstripe darter
- Cottus specus, grotto sculpin, a rare fish found only in Perry County, which is federally listed as endangered. It is of the order Scorpaeniformes.
- Etheostoma histrio, harlequin darter
- Acipenser fulvescens, lake sturgeon
- Percina nasuta, longnose darter
- Noturus eleutherus, mountain madtom
- Noturus placidus, Neosho madtom
- Etheostoma nianguae, Niangua darter
- Amblyopsis rosae, Ozark cavefish
- Scaphirhynchus albus, pallid sturgeon
- Etheostoma whipplei, redfin darter
- Notropis sabinae, sabine shiner, an eastern shiner
- Forbesichthys agassizi, spring cavefish, the only Missouri cavefish with eyes.
- Etheostoma fusiforme, swamp darter
- Notropis maculatus, taillight shiner, an eastern shiner
- Notropis topeka, Topeka shiner, an eastern shiner

=== Mammals ===
- Spilogale putorius, eastern spotted skunk
- Myotis grisescens, gray bat
- Myotis sodalis, Indiana bat
- Canis lupus, gray wolf (or timber wolf)

== Plants ==
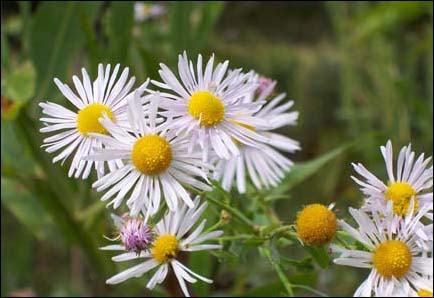
Boltonia decurrens

- Boltonia decurrens, decurrent false aster
- Geocarpon minimum, known as tinytim, earth fruit, or simply geocarpon
- Asclepias meadii, Mead's milkweed
- Physaria filiformis, Missouri bladderpod
- Lindera melissifolia, pondberry
- Trifolium stoloniferum, running buffalo clover
- Platanthera praeclara, western prairie fringed orchid
