= Snake soup =

Chinese soup

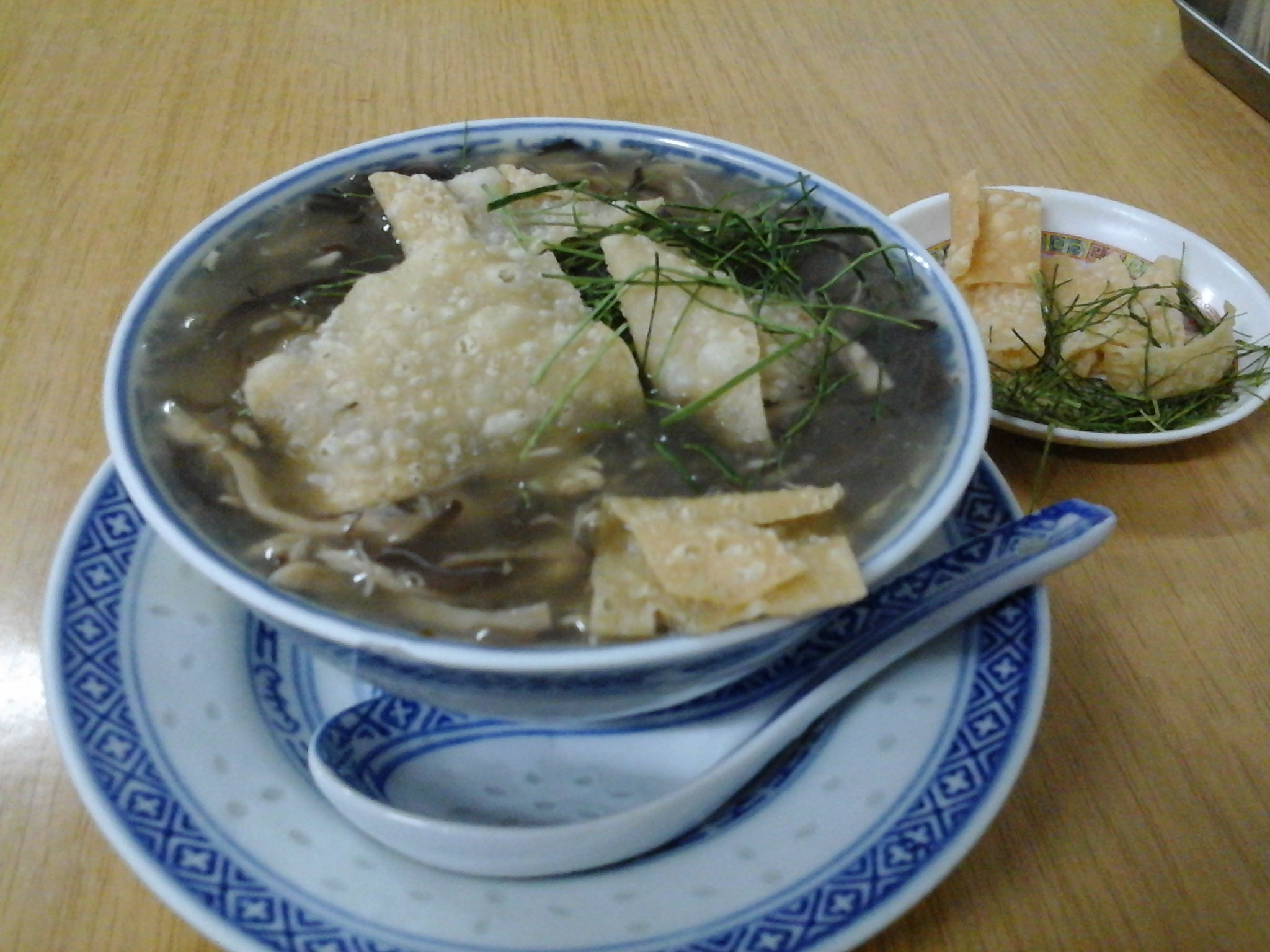
A bowl of snake soup with condiments of shredded lemon leaves and fried dough

Snake soup or stew (Chinese: 蛇羹; pinyin: shé gēng; Jyutping: se4 gang1) is a popular Cantonese delicacy and health supplement in Hong Kong, which contains the meats of at least two types of snakes as the main ingredients. The soup tastes slightly sweet because of the addition of chrysanthemum leaves and spices, while the snake meat in the soup is said to resemble the texture and taste of chicken meat. Snake soup is usually served in specialised stores known as "Snake King" or "Shea Wang", mostly located in Shum Shui Po and Kowloon City, in fall or winter season for approximately $60 HKD (US$7.75) per bowl. Originated centuries ago during the Era of Warring States, snake soup has been lauded in Chinese culture for its alleged medicinal benefits and high nutritional value. However, there are concerns in recent years that the snake soup industry in Hong Kong is on the decline because soup makers have few people to pass on their skills.

== Historical background ==
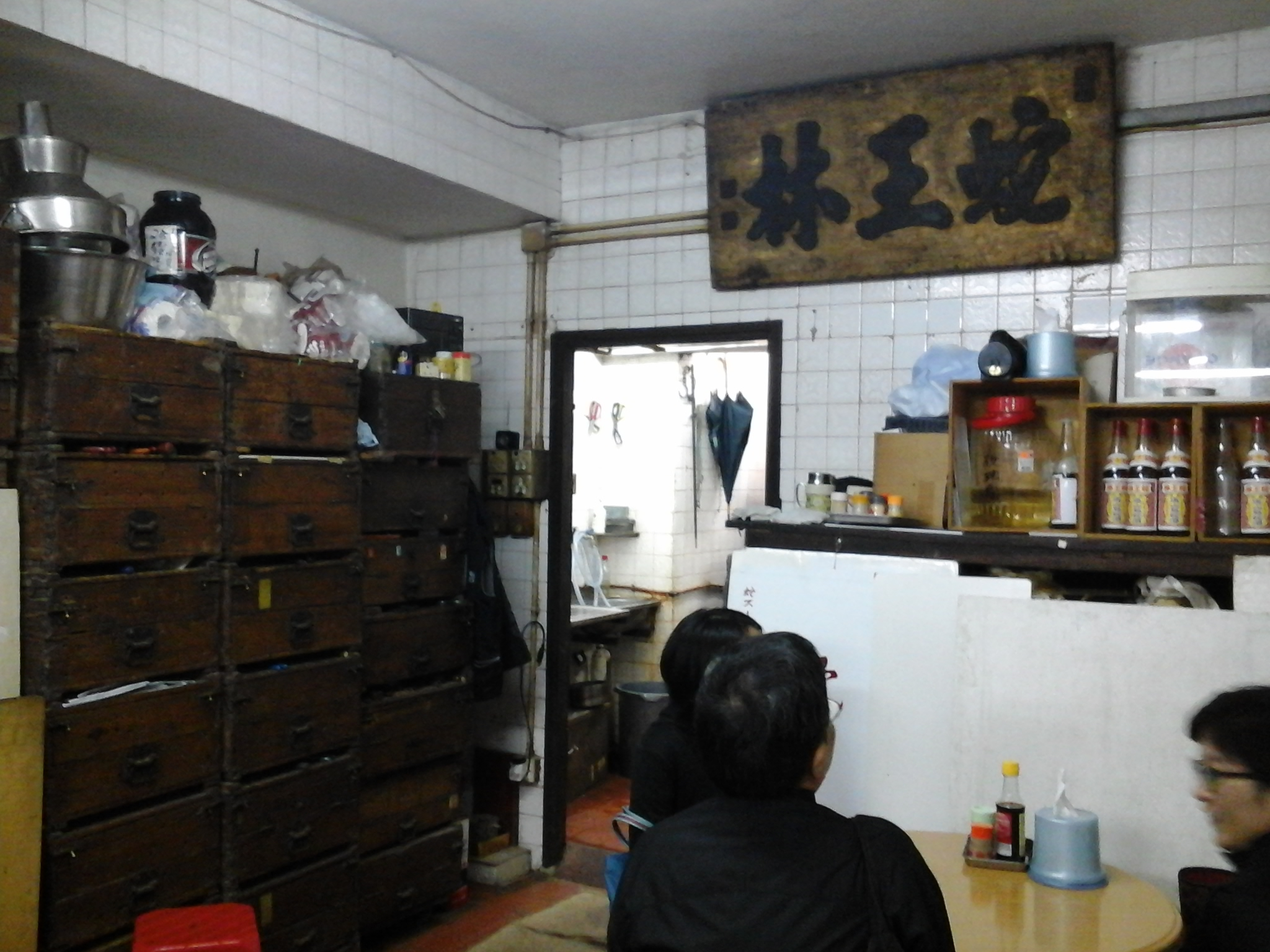
Snake emporium in Sheung Wan, Hong Kong; diners awaiting; wooden crates of "venomous snakes" on the left

Snake soup has been considered a delicacy in Chinese culture for over two thousand years. Pre-Qin's Shanhaijing recorded that inhabitants in Guangdong province started to consume snake soups; and the eating culture was widely popularised in China at the end of Qing Dynasty. Snake soup was regarded as a “high-status” dish because of its varied ingredients and complicated preparation, it was the symbol of wealth, bravery and respect; and was only served to certain officials and celebrities.

“Snake King Lam” was the first store specialising in selling snake soup in Hong Kong, which was set up on Bonham Street 110 years ago, but has relocated to Hillier Street in the same district. The snake-soup industry reached its golden period in the 1980s when there were over 100 eateries that prepared snake soup. Some stores in Hong Kong even had to open new branches to cope with the high demand.

Nowadays, the number of stores specialising in snake-soup has dropped down to 20 because of food price inflation and soaring rent. More importantly, it is also difficult for snake-soup makers to find successors. Fewer people enter the profession because of perceived hardship, danger and difficulty involved in the process, which requires frequent contact with venomous snakes. Moreover, severe supply problems caused by bureaucracy involved in snake importation are matched by the erratic pattern of demand from customers.

== Preparation ==
Typical snake soup recipe calls for at least two types of snakes whose flesh is shredded into thread-like wires. One course of action taken is that the flesh is put with stock into a machine that infuses the stock's taste. The flesh can also be air boiled with chicken, pork bone, lean meat, fish maw, fungus, ginger, lemon leaves, and other spices for flavor. The mixture is stewed for over six hours into a thick soup, seasoned with salt pepper and dark soy to taste. Most importantly, a thickener, typically corn starch or water caltrop paste, is added, making it a thick soup with a transparent appearance, rather than broth. More elaborate snake soup preparations involve additional ingredients such as pork chops, and herbs and spices, including star anise.

The species of snake used in cooking varies from place to place but water snake and python are popular choices. Chinese cobra, banded krait, Indo-Chinese rat snake, tri-rope beauty snake and hundred-pace viper are commonly used in snake soups. At many restaurants that serve snake soups, customers can choose, according to their preference, live snakes to be prepared.

== Taste ==
Snake meat is light pink in color. On a par with fish, snake meat tastes much richer and is chewier than the former. Ramy Inocencio of CNN describes that "Minced dark mushrooms, finely julienned chicken, fragrant chopped ginger and other herbs and spices fill out the recipe, making for a hearty broth. It tastes like chicken too – though a tad tougher."

Traditionally, serving snake soup with very thinly-shredded lemon leaves and chrysanthemum flowers dilutes the saltiness. Nowadays many also add pepper, vinegar and thin wafers of fried dough to enrich flavor and texture. With the preferred crab claw chrysanthemum in short supply, boltonia often replaces it.

== Folk medicine ==
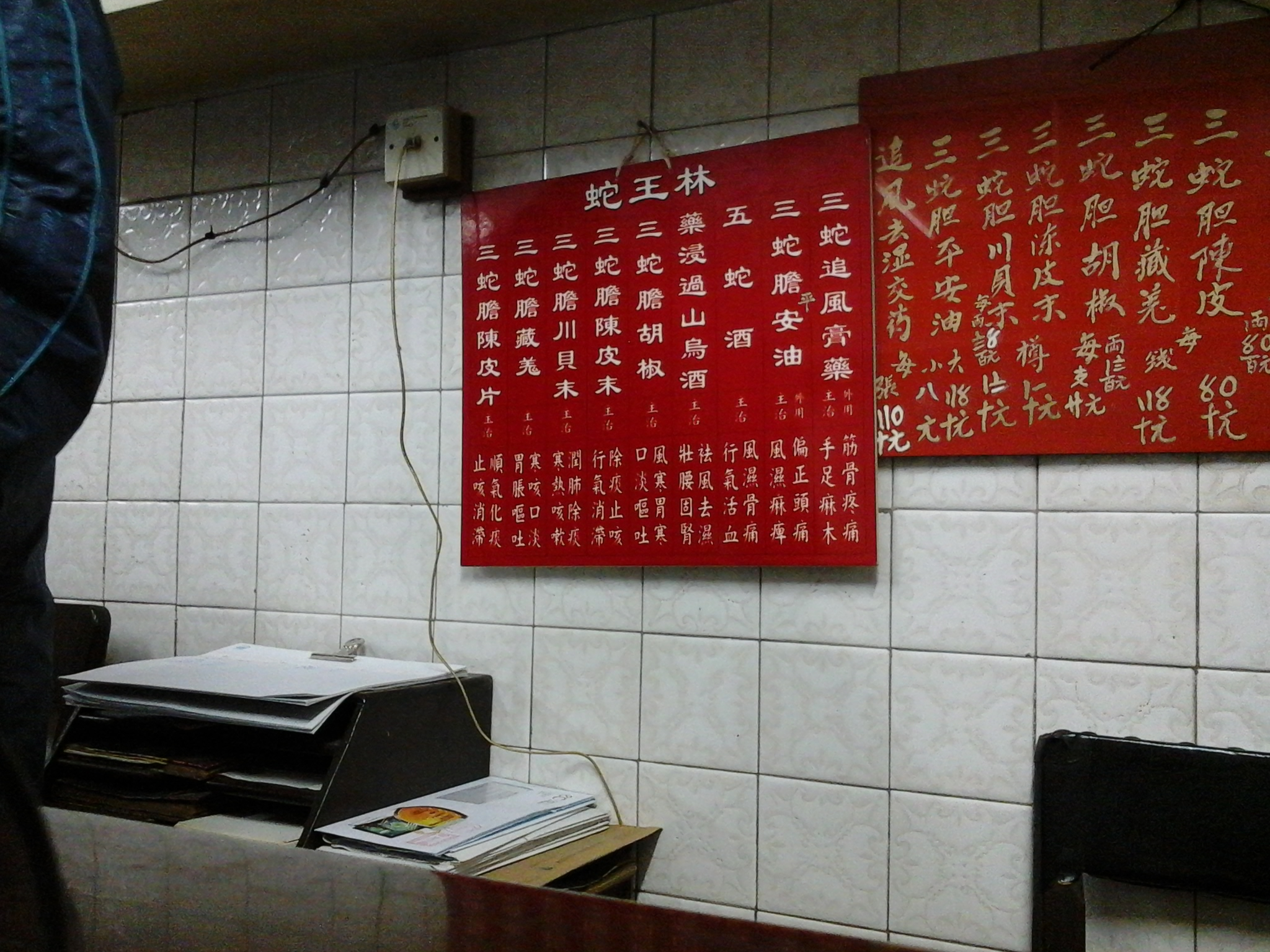
Plaque describing the supposed medicinal qualities of snake products on offer

It is believed in old Chinese medical books that snake soup has a number of medicinal benefits, including the cure of bodily ailments, blood nourishment, improvement of skin quality and increase in one's qi or energy levels. It is also widely believed among the Chinese people that snake soup is a "warming" food, which heats up the body (or gives it yang which can balance the "cooling" yin during the winter season.

== See also ==
- Shia Wong Hip, a restaurant specialising in snake dishes and snake soup, located on Apliu Street, Kowloon, Hong Kong
