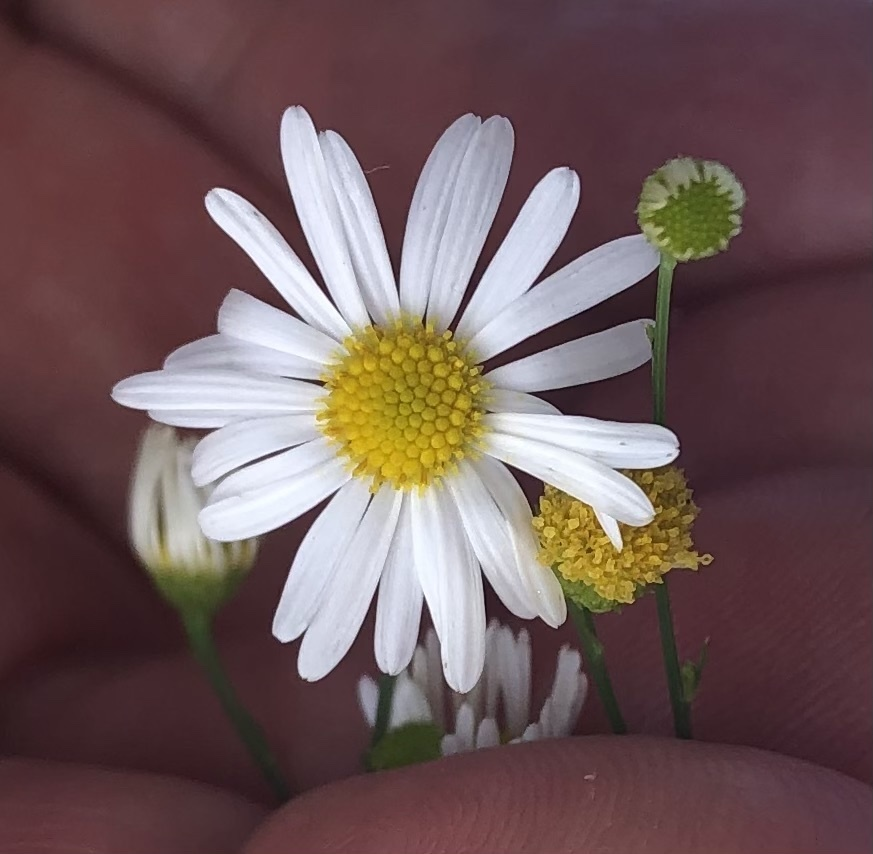

Conservation status
- Apparently Secure (NatureServe)

Scientific classification
- Kingdom: Plantae
- Clade: Tracheophytes
- Clade: Angiosperms
- Clade: Eudicots
- Clade: Asterids
- Order: Asterales
- Family: Asteraceae
- Genus: Boltonia
- Species: B. caroliniana

Binomial name
- Boltonia caroliniana (Walter) Fernald

Synonyms
- Boltonia ravenelii Fernald & Griscom; Chrysanthemum carolinianum Walter

= Boltonia caroliniana =

Species of flowering plant

Boltonia caroliniana, common name Carolina doll's-daisy, is a North American species of plants in the family Asteraceae. It is found only in the southeastern United States, primarily in the states of North Carolina, South Carolina, and Virginia with a few isolated populations in western Georgia.

Boltonia caroliniana is a perennial herb up to 200 cm (79 in) tall. It has many daisy-like flower heads with white or lilac ray florets and yellow disc florets.

The Carolina doll's-daisy can grow to 4–6 feet (1.2–1.8 m) tall, with a waxy smooth stem and leaves. Tends to be bushier than B. asteroides. It lacks wings on the seeds, unlike B. diffusa. NatureServe assigns Boltonia caroliniana a global conservation rank of G4, indicating that the species is apparently secure, although some uncertainty remains.
