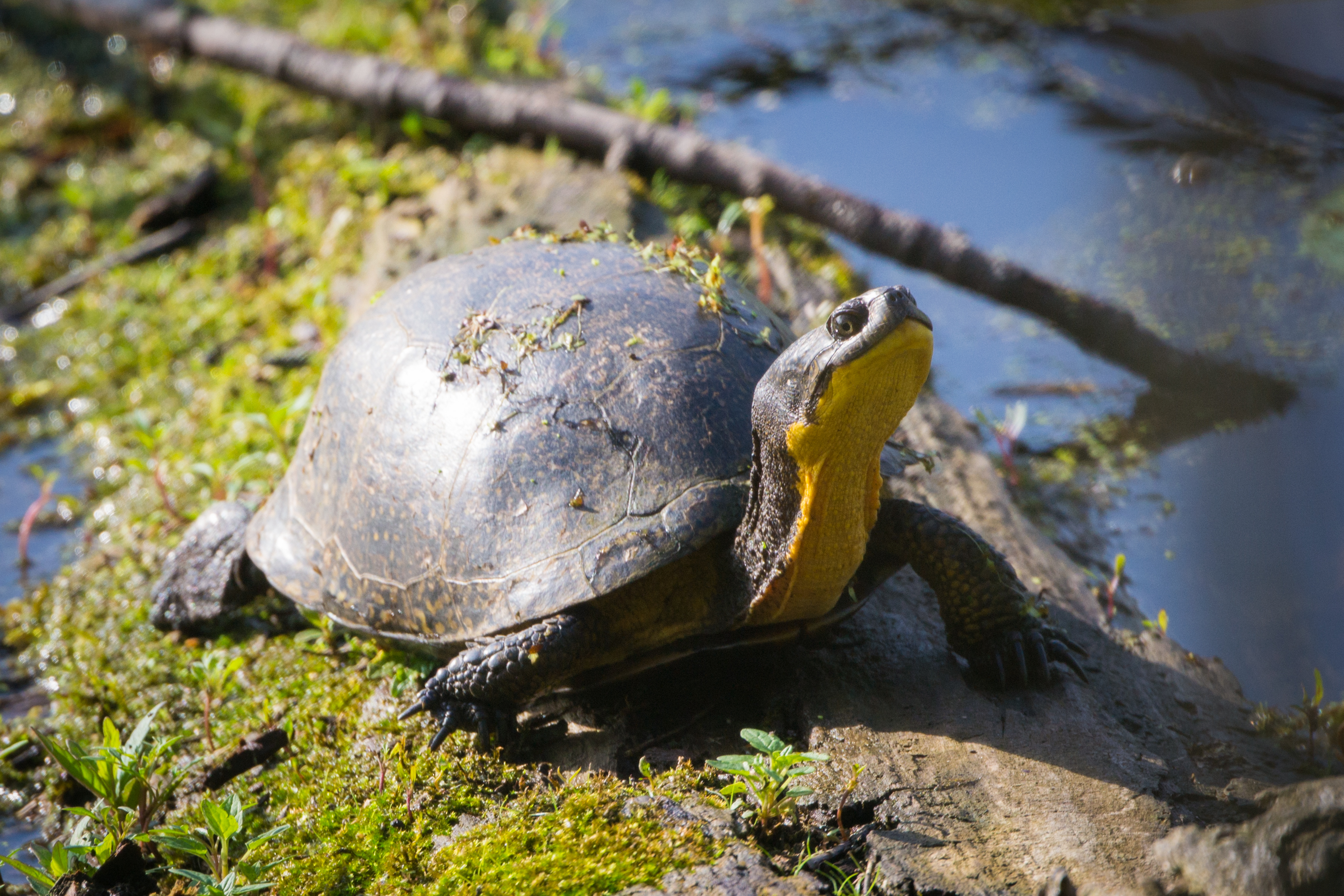

Conservation status
- Endangered (IUCN 3.1)
- CITES Appendix II

Scientific classification
- Kingdom: Animalia
- Phylum: Chordata
- Class: Reptilia
- Order: Testudines
- Suborder: Cryptodira
- Family: Emydidae
- Subfamily: Emydinae
- Genus: Emydoidea; JE Gray, 1870
- Species: E. blandingii

Binomial name
- Emydoidea blandingii (Holbrook, 1838)
- The range of Blanding's turtle

Synonyms
- Testudo flava Lacépède, 1788 (nomen suppressum); Testudo flava — Bonaterre, 1789 (nomen suppressum); Testudo meleagris Shaw, 1793 (nomen suppressum); Cistuda blandingii Holbrook, 1838 (nomen conservandum); Emys blandingii — Strauch, 1862; Emydoidea blandingii — Gray, 1870; Emys twentei Taylor, 1943

= Blanding's turtle =

Species of turtle

Blanding's turtle (Emydoidea blandingii) is a species of semi-aquatic turtle of the family Emydidae. This species is native to central and eastern parts of Canada and the United States. It is considered to be an endangered species throughout much of its range. Blanding's turtle is of interest in longevity research, as it shows few or no common signs of aging and is physically active and capable of reproduction into eight or nine decades of life.

== Taxonomy ==
There are differences of opinion as to the genus for this species; both Emys and Emydoidea occur in published sources in 2009, 2010, and 2011.

== Etymology ==
Both the specific name, blandingii, and the common name, Blanding's turtle, are in honor of American naturalist Dr. William Blanding (1773–1857). The Blanding’s turtle is also known as “the turtle with the sun under its chin,” a name that comes from Indigenous oral traditions. In one Indigenous creation story, the turtle is said to have rescued the sun and returned it to the sky by carrying it in its mouth. This left the turtle with the permanent glow of the sun on its neck and chin.

== Description ==
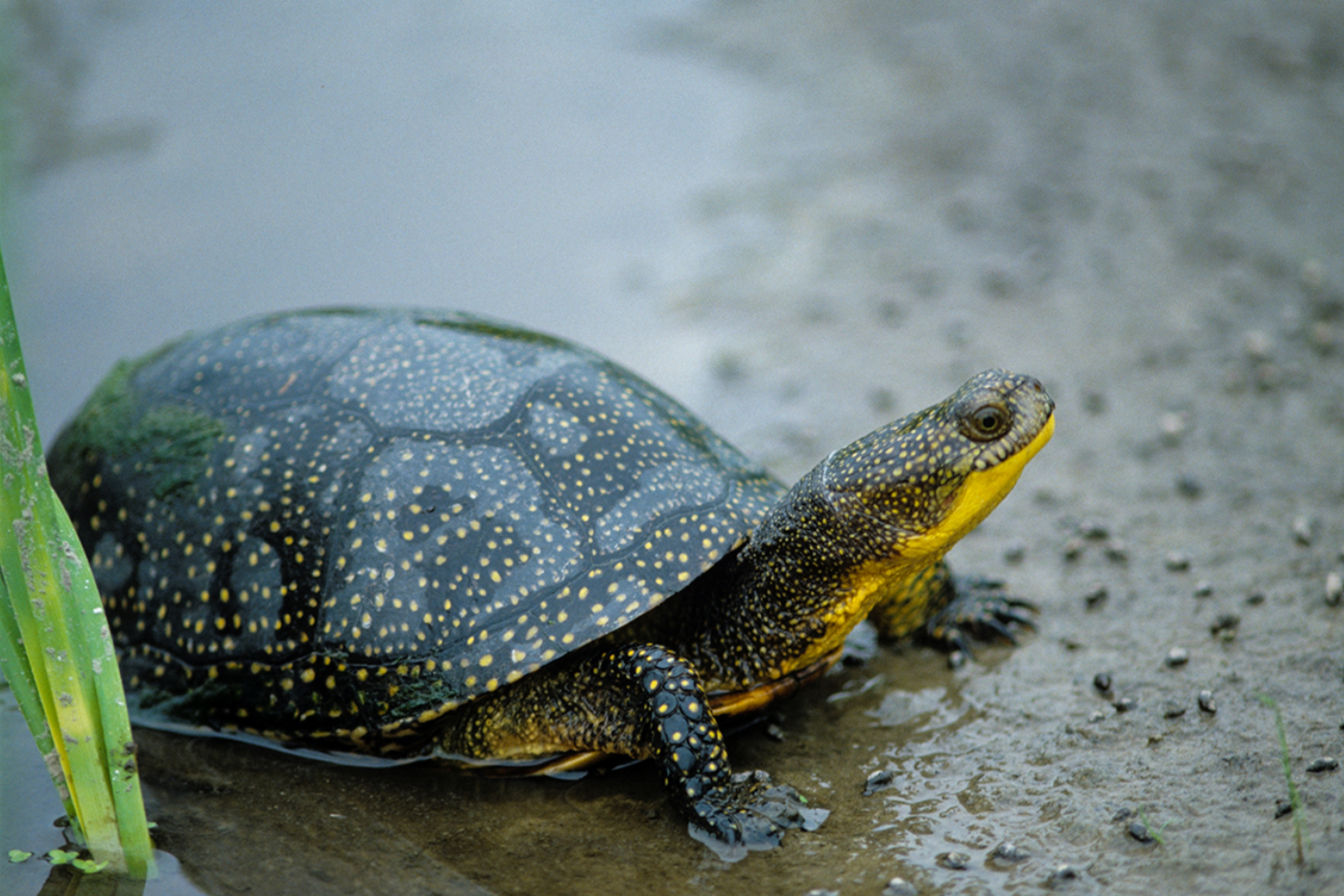
Blanding's turtle.

Blanding's turtle is a medium-sized turtle with an average straight carapace length of approximately 18 to 23 cm (7.1 to 9.1 in) with a maximum of 25.5 cm (10.0 in). A distinguishing feature of this turtle is the bright yellow chin and throat. The carapace, or upper shell, is domed, but slightly flattened along the midline, and is oblong when viewed from above. The carapace is speckled with numerous yellow or light-colored flecks or streaks on a dark background. The plastron, or lower shell, is yellow with dark blotches symmetrically arranged. The head and legs are dark, and usually speckled or mottled with yellow. Blanding's turtle is also called the "semi-box" turtle, for although the plastron is hinged, the plastral lobes do not shut as tight as the box turtles'.

== Reproduction ==
Blanding's turtle takes 14–20 years to reach sexual maturity. Mating begins between March and April and nests are dug from late May into early July . Clutch size varies from region to region. In New York, the clutch size ranges from five to twelve eggs, with an average of eight. The sex of the hatchlings is determined by the temperature of the eggs during development. Colder temperatures produce males, while warmer temperatures produce female hatchlings.

== Behavior and life span ==
Blanding's turtle overwinters under or near water, in mud, or under vegetation or debris. This is known as brumation. During the nesting season, a female Blanding's turtle may be found more than a kilometer from where it hibernated. It is omnivorous, eating crustaceans (including crayfish), insects (such as dragonfly nymphs and aquatic beetles), snails and other invertebrates, fish, fish eggs, frogs, carrion, berries, seeds, and vegetable debris. It will eat coontail, duckweed, sedge, and bulrush. It is capable of catching live fish. Based on the extreme lack of aging symptoms and lack of age related decline, this turtle is considered a negligibly senescent species.

The Blanding's turtle exhibits timid defensive behaviors, retiring to its shell or remaining underwater for hours when disturbed. It is a highly agile and effective swimmer.

== Distribution and habitat ==
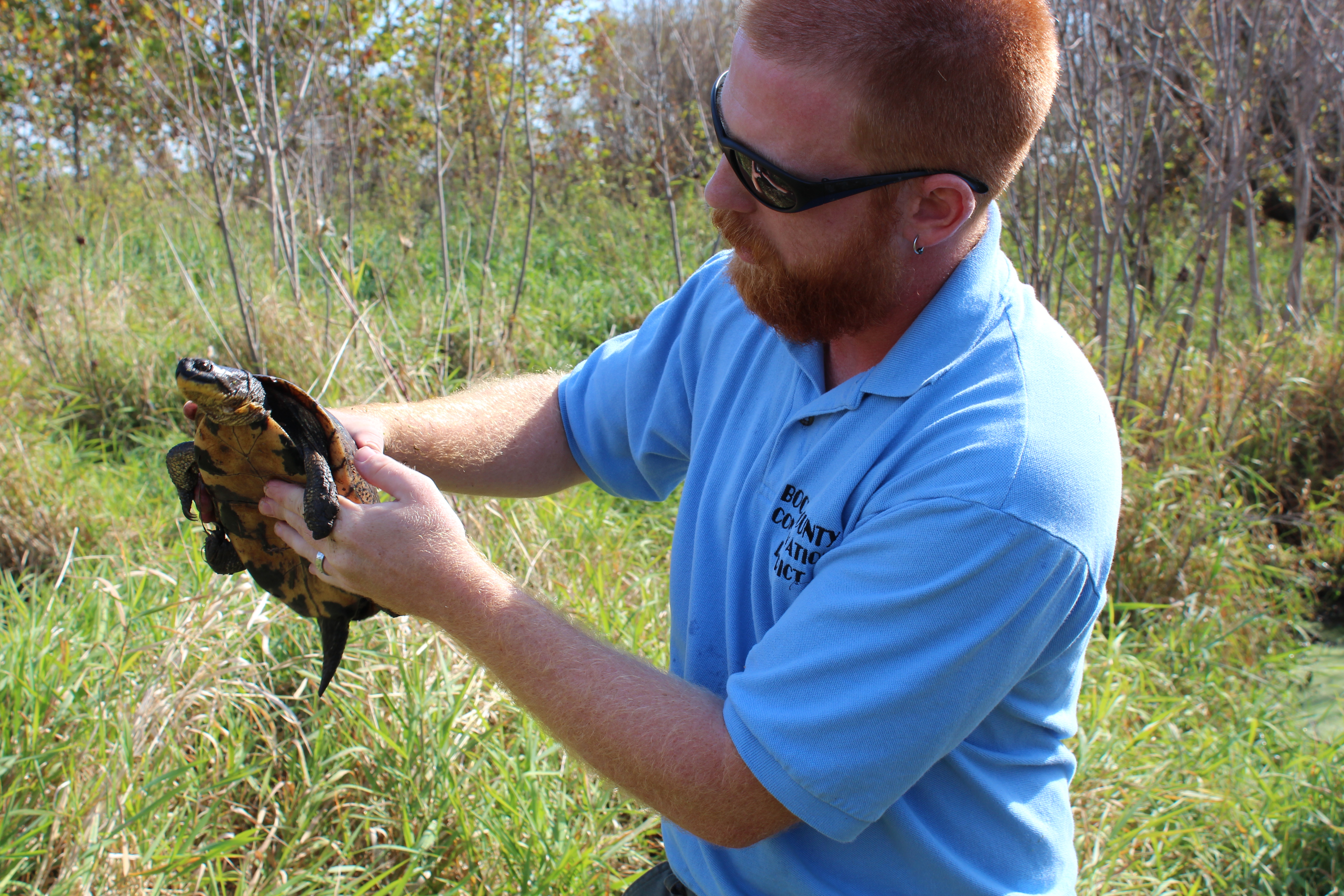
Affixing a transmitter for research purposes

The geographic range of E. blandingii centres on the Great Lakes, and extends from central Nebraska and Minnesota (where it twice failed to become the state reptile) eastward through southern Ontario and the south shore of Lake Erie as far east as northern New York. In Nebraska, this turtle is uncommon in the eastern portion of the state, but common to abundant in the Sand Hills region lakes, ponds, and streams. There are also isolated populations in southeastern New York (Dutchess County), New England, and Nova Scotia.

Its general habitat is wetlands with clean shallow water. It is known to bask on logs, and will wander far from water, particularly when nesting. It generally nests in sunny areas, with well drained soil. Younger turtles may bask on sedge and alder hummocks. Young will often travel far in search of mating sites, new habitat, or new food sources, as do elder turtles.

== Conservation status ==
The primary threat to Blanding's turtle is habitat fragmentation and destruction as well as nest predation by unnaturally large populations of predators. It is listed as an endangered species on the IUCN Red List as endangered in some U.S. states, and as either threatened or endangered throughout Canada, though in the U.S. it has no federal status. International trade in Blanding's turtle is restricted, as the species is listed in Appendix II of the Convention on International Trade in Endangered Species (CITES) meaning that international trade is regulated by the CITES permit system.

This species can also be adversely affected by prescribed burns. During fall and late spring hatchlings move overland and it is recommended that prescribed burns should be avoided during these times.

The U.S. states in which it is considered endangered are Indiana, Illinois, Missouri, Maine, New Hampshire, Massachusetts, and South Dakota. It is considered threatened in New York and Iowa. In Michigan, Blanding's turtle is also fully protected as a special concern species, making it unlawful to kill, take, trap, possess, buy, or sell. In Lake County, Illinois, a long-term species recovery program has been underway since 2009.

In Canada, the Great Lakes–St. Lawrence River population in Ontario and Quebec is federally threatened, and the Nova Scotia population is endangered. Conservation and recovery efforts in Nova Scotia have been in place for two decades and rely on habitat and life history monitoring based on the work of conservation practitioners, researchers, and volunteers. Habitat protection has proven crucial. The population in Kejimkujik National Park has been placed under the highest level of protection, where volunteers and Parks Canada staff carry out annual efforts to protect the turtle's nests from predation and monitor their population over time. The McGowan Lake population was initially protected by Bowater but has since been taken over by the Province. In Pleasant River, the Nova Scotia Nature Trust protects four separate segments of critical habitat.
