= Shia Wong Hip =

Restaurant in Hong Kong

Shia Wong Hip Limited 蛇王協有限公司

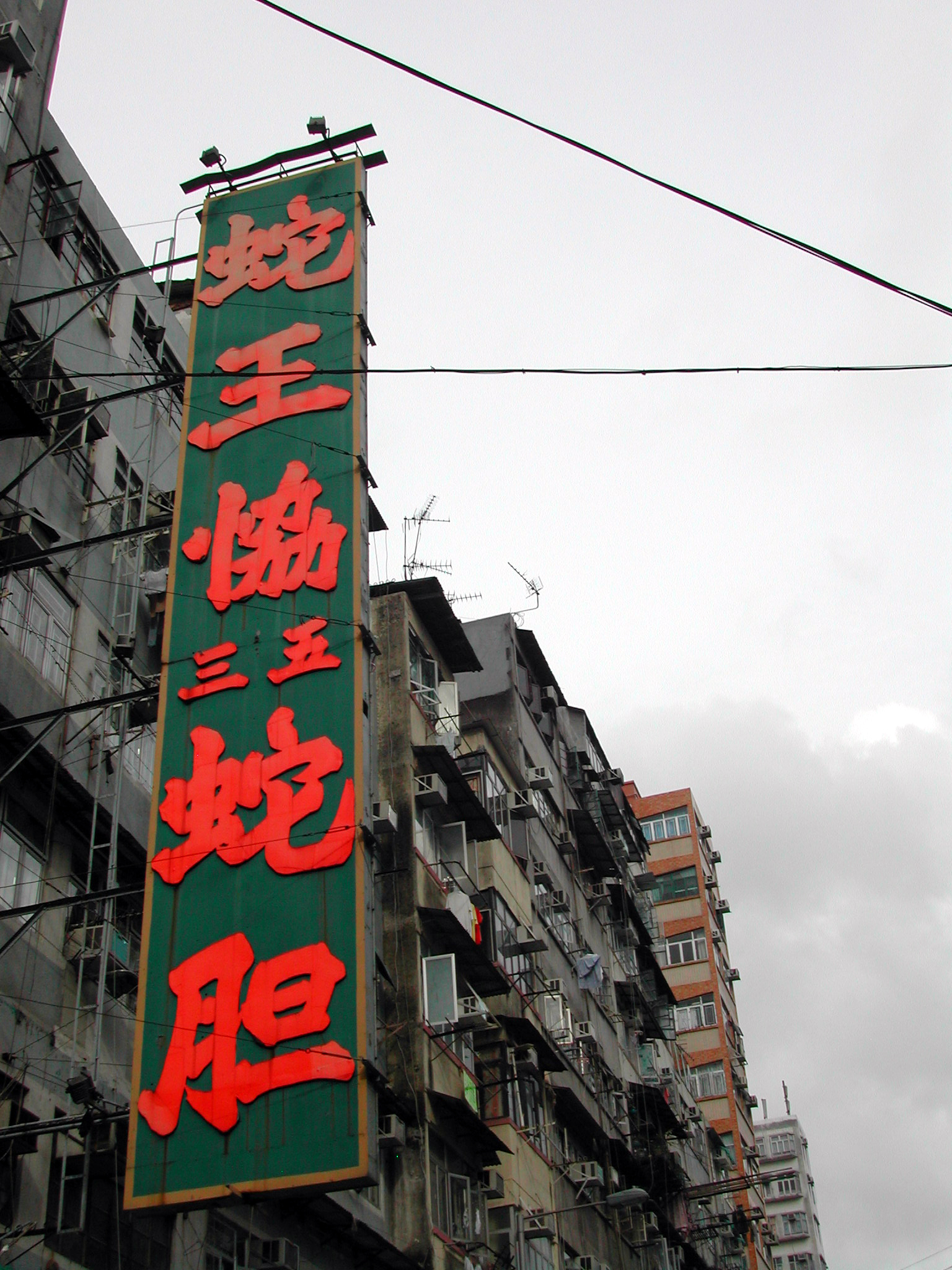
- Shia Wong Hip's sign
- Interactive map of Shia Wong Hip Limited 蛇王協有限公司

Restaurant information
- Established: 1965
- Owner: Chau Ka Ling (Chinese: 周嘉玲)
- Previous owner: Chow Cheung (Chinese: 周祥)
- Food type: Cantonese cuisine Snakes
- Location: 170 Apliu Street, Sham Shui Po, Hong Kong
- Coordinates: 22.3298°N 114.1627°E
- Website: www.shiawonghip.com

Shia Wong Hip
- Traditional Chinese: 蛇王協有限公司
- Simplified Chinese: 蛇王协有限公司
Transcriptions
Standard Mandarin
- Hanyu Pinyin: Shé Wáng Xié yǒuxiàn gōngsī
Yue: Cantonese
- Jyutping: se^{4} wong^{4} hip^{3} jau^{5}haan^{6} gung^{1}si^{1}

Shia Wong Hip Limited (Chinese: 蛇王協有限公司) is a restaurant specialising in snake dishes located on Apliu Street in Sham Shui Po, New Kowloon, Hong Kong.

Founded in 1965 by Chau Xiang, the restaurant specialises in snake soup and serves Cantonese cuisine made from exotic animals such as wattle-necked softshell turtles, crocodiles, geckos, silkworms, and seahorses. Dishes served include "fried snake balls", "barbecued snake", "glistening snake skin casserole", "dark golden-brown fried snake meat", "stir-fried crocodile meat", and "snake gall bladder wine". Shia Wong Hip stores hundreds and sometimes thousands of live snakes in wooden drawers. It has a cobra in a cage visible from the storefront. The restaurant purchases its snakes from mainland China, Indonesia, and Malaysia and supplements its income by selling snakes to restaurants and snakeskin to factories that make wallets, shoes, handbags, and belts.

Originally located on Nam Cheong Street, Shia Wong Hip was moved to Apliu Street in the 1970s. Chau Xiang's daughter, Chau Ka Ling, in 1971 started working at the restaurant from age 13 and took over the business in 1991 after her father died. She runs it with her two younger brothers. The Hong Kong government has recognised Chau Ka Ling as the only woman snake-catcher in the region, which earned her the name "Snake Queen".

== History ==
Snake queen Chau Ka Ling performed a snake dance in front of Shia Wong Hip on 3 April 2019. She knocked on the cobra's head and kissed the cobra's head.

Shia Wong Hip, which in English means "Snake King Brothers" or "Snake King Cooperative", was founded in 1965 by Chau Xiang (Chinese: 周祥). Chau immigrated from Huadu District in Guangzhou to Hong Kong in the 1950s. He initially sold ye wei such as pangolins and masked palm civets. Owing to snake sales being very good, he started Shia Wong Hip at Nam Cheong Street in 1965. When the building owner saw it was a profitable business and wanted to start a business there, Chau was forced to raise funds from his friends to relocate the restaurant to Apliu Street in the late 1970s. Chau's family had a challenging experience because Sham Shui Po station was not open yet and the restaurant did not have enough business. Chau Xiang had two daughters and five sons who worked at the restaurant with him and his wife. Previously a group of people owned shares in the restaurant, though eventually Chau became sole owner and he was then succeeded by his children.

Shia Wong Hip is currently located on Apliu Street and is concealed at the rear of market stalls on the street. The restaurant's specialty is snake soup. It is owned by Chau Ka Ling (Chinese: 周嘉玲), the second-generation operator of the restaurant who as a youth learned from her father, the restaurant's founder, how to deal with snakes. In the 1960s, it was challenging for Chau's father to recruit workers willing to interact with snakes. Chau had a youthful desire to become a seamstress. But as the oldest of seven children, Chau felt a filial duty to help her father with the restaurant. She began working at the restaurant in 1971 when she was 13 years old, as she was not doing well with her homework and wanted to find her happiness in the family business. She trudged to Western District Public Cargo Working Area to purchase snakes. She studied the business from the shifus her father brought on. One shifu was an expert in how to handle snakes while a second was an expert in how to make snake soup. In her first three months at the restaurant, she would only slice snake meat as she was too fearful to actually kill the snake. After witnessing the daughter of the owner of snake restaurant Sher Wong Yip on Nam Cheong Street kill snakes, she summoned enough courage to begin killing snakes herself. Her father had high demands for her, instructing her to perform different aspects of the business such as cleaning and welcoming customers. The snakes the restaurant buys need to be defanged, a risky task. At age 17, she began defanging snakes. In the 1980s and 1990s, Chau performed snake dances at restaurants and on television shows such as on TVB's Enjoy Yourself Tonight. She taught viewers how to make snake dishes on Women Life. When Josephine Siao starred in a movie involving snakes, she asked Chau to teach her about them.

Chau Ka Ling was the only one to assist with running the restaurant until her father died in 1990 or 1991 of a heart attack when buying snakes in Guangzhou, after which her younger siblings started to take part in the business. Two brothers run the business with her. Despite her instructing both of them how to defang snakes, a single brother agrees to do it because of the risk of harm. Chow Pak Kiu (Chinese: 周伯桥) is a brother who owns and runs the business with her. CHOW Pak Sun（Calvin）(Chinese: 周柏新), a brother who is the youngest of the siblings, worked at the restaurant in his youth. After getting tired of working with snakes, he studied abroad in the United States for electronic engineering and returned to Hong Kong to work in an electronics factory. Upon the closure of the factory owing to the 1997 Asian financial crisis, Chau left the electronics industry in 2000 and returned to work at Shia Wong Hip.

The Hong Kong government recognised Chau Ka Ling as the only woman snake-catcher in the region, a role that gave her the responsibility to assist the government in catching wild snakes and gave her the nickname "Snake Queen". The Agriculture, Fisheries and Conservation Department pays her several hundred dollars to catch snakes in residences. Chau is married, has no children, and in 2013 was in her early 50s. She declined to train anyone to take over her business, saying, "I've killed snakes for so many year, but actually I don't want to. Because there are fewer and fewer snakes now. But I can't make a career change. There's nothing else I can do." Her husband is a snake trader who looks for snakes in different locations in Southeast Asia.

In 2003, the severe acute respiratory syndrome (SARS) outbreak led China to bar exports of snake and caused speculation that snakes are carriers for SARS, which led to Shia Wong Hip having purchases down by 70%. Shia Wong needed to import snakes from Southeast Asia, which raised costs because shipment fees led snakes from Southeast Asia to be 30% more expensive than those from China and shipped snakes were more likely to die. According to the Food and Environmental Hygiene Department, in 2013 Shia Wong was one of only 18 stores in Hong Kong licensed to sell live snakes. The restaurant has been profiled by the TVB show Midnight Banquets.

== Food and products ==
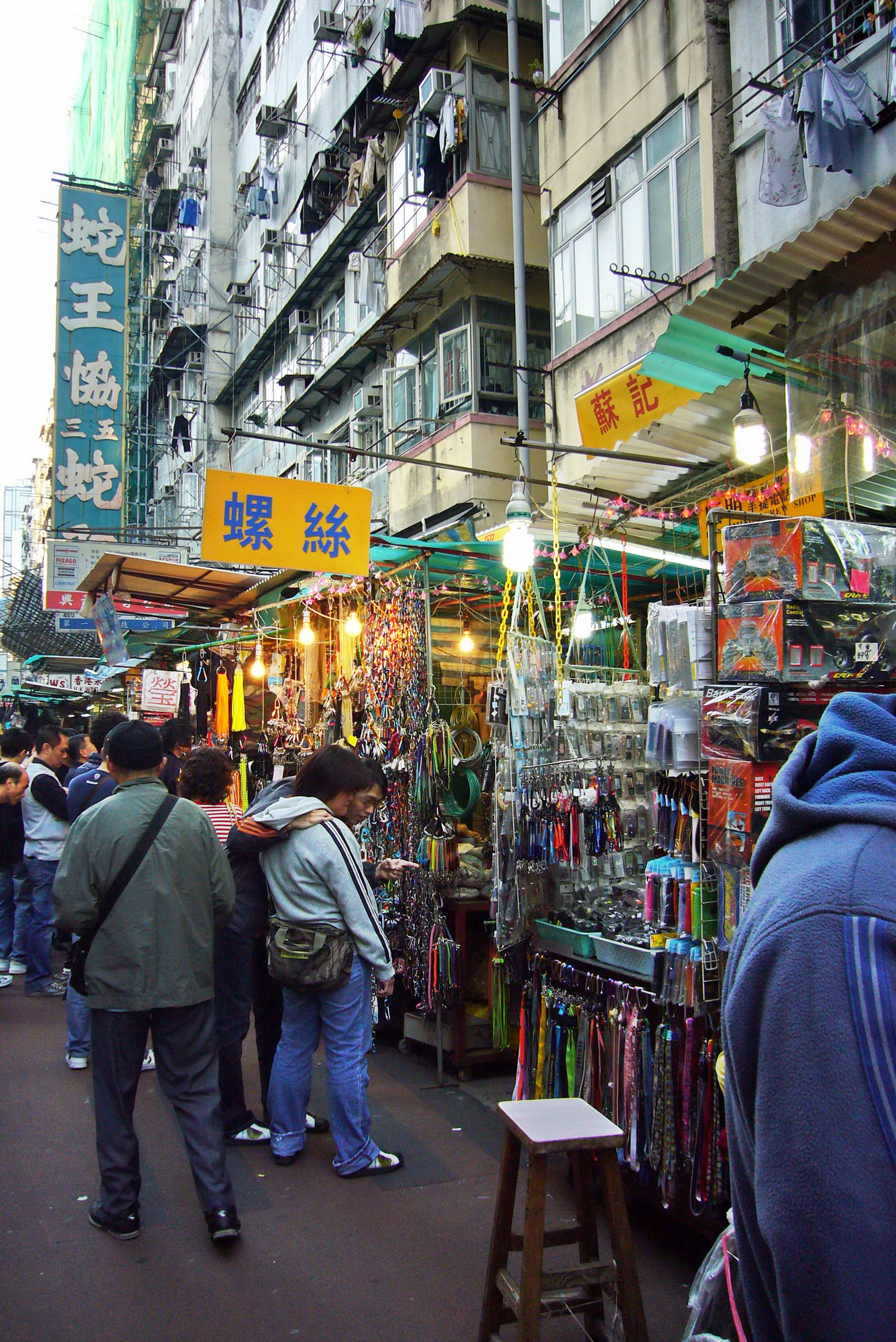
The area around Shia Wong Hip with its sign in the distance

Shia Wong serves Cantonese cuisine made from exotic animals. Animals served include snakes, turtles with hard shells, wattle-necked softshell turtles, crocodiles, and geckos. The restaurant has snakeskin bags, snakeskin products, snakeskin belts, and snake wine for purchase. A cobra in a cage is visible from outside the restaurant. Placed close to the entryway, the snake is alive and waiting to be prepared as food. The restaurant houses the snakes in a set of brown cupboards made of wood at the back. The cupboards are imprinted with the bright red warning "poisonous snakes" written in Chinese and stores hundreds, occasionally thousands, of snakes that are alive. Chinese cobras, banded krait, and king cobras are stored in the cupboards. The restaurant has tiled walls plastered with both cuttings from newspapers and coloured paper containing Chinese symbols. Its cupboards have a variety of items such as plastic bags and glass jars. Diners sit on wooden stools at formica tables on a tiled floor coloured pink and white.

Shia Wong Hip sources five kinds of snakes from China, Indonesia, and Malaysia two times a week to create its soup. Sea snakes are added to increase the chewiness. It previously sourced most snakes from Mainland China but began importing snakes from other countries after China began curbing the sale of snakes outside the mainland. The restaurant boils the snake soup base from 9:00 pm to 3:00 am, after which slices of snake meat, fungus, ginger, and Jinhua ham are mixed in. Shia Wong Hip receives licences from Hong Kong's Agriculture, Fisheries and Conservation Department and other countries' analogous departments to import snakes to Hong Kong. Additional materials used to create the soup are slivers of lemon leaves, vinegar, black fungus, and mandarin orange peels. Taking six hours to stew, the soup base contains 20 pounds of pork bones, 30 pounds of snake bones, and two old chickens. Dishes served include "fried snake balls", "barbecued snake", "glistening snake skin casserole", "dark golden-brown fried snake meat", "stir-fried crocodile meat", and "snake gall bladder wine". Additional dishes are "snake turtle soup", "braised snake belly", "salt and pepper snake stew". Shia Wong Hip uses the snake's internal organs to concoct an herbal treatment for skin issues. It sells leather products made out of snakeskin. A soup serves customers is one made of lizards, silkworms, and seahorses. It markets a "snake banquet" for a dozen people. According to Rough Guides, "less adventurous" customers are able to select "delicious" sticky rice sprinkled with Chinese sausage to eat. Time Out found the restaurant's snake soup to be low-cost and cheaper than other restaurants' and to taste richer. Shia Wong Hip resells snakes to restaurants such as The Chinese Restaurant at Hyatt Regency Hong Kong, Tsim Sha Tsui and sells snakeskin to factories that produce wallets, shoes, handbags, and belts.

In 2007, customers on average purchased 600 bowls of snake soup daily which amounted to 1,800 snakes that in total weigh 20 kilograms (44 lb). On the most bustling days in winter, the restaurant makes more than 1,000 bowls of snake soup for customers. Its customers eat dishes such as snake soup in the belief that it will heat up their body during the winter cold. Upon finishing their food, restaurant patrons can ask to carry a snake. In October 2017, the restaurant had fewer customers which Chau attributed to climate change causing Hong Kong to have a warm winter. When Hong Kong had cold weather on Christmas Eve in 2023, a line of over 30 people formed at the restaurant for snake soup. Five employees served customers who ate at the restaurant and ordered takeaways.

== Reception ==
Taras Grescoe of the Los Angeles Times wrote that Shia Wong Hip "serves a deliciously spicy soup made from snakes displayed in cages piled to the ceilings, and shots of brandy". Christy Choi of South China Morning Post called Shia Wong Hip a "celebrated snake restaurant". Apple Daily's Lai Wing Sze said Shia Wong Hip is a "time-honored brand" and that its snake soup's "overall level is good". The magazine Weekend Weekly said the snake soup was "fresh, sweet, and delicious, had a slight aroma of medicinal herbs, and was the best way to warm up in winter".

In an article titled "Hong Kong's best snake soup" that lists five restaurants, Time Out's Holly Graham wrote, "The lemon leaves atop the thick snake soup here provide a welcome zesty kick to the dish." In a video series focused on Hong Kong's "hidden delights", James Moore of the South China Morning Post visited Shia Wong Hip, and he said, "this type of restaurant is a dying breed in Hong Kong". He tried snake soup and was "pleasantly surprised", praising it for tasting normal and being "not spicy in any way".
