= Tavern Creek =

Tavern Creek may refer to:

- Tavern Creek (Missouri River), a stream in Missouri
- Tavern Creek (Osage River), a stream in Missouri
