= False chamomile =

False chamomile is a common name for several plants and may refer to:

- Boltonia asteroides
- Tripleurospermum inodorum
- Tripluerospermum maritimum
