= Boltonia ellipsium =

Scientific classification
- Kingdom: Plantae
- Clade: Tracheophytes
- Clade: Angiosperms
- Clade: Eudicots
- Clade: Asterids
- Order: Asterales
- Family: Asteraceae
- Genus: Boltonia
- Species: B. ellipsium

Binomial name
- Boltonia ellipsium

Species of flowering plant

Boltonia ellipsium is a species of perennial plant within the Asteraceae family. It is also known to be rhizomatous, which is commonly seen throughout non-woody plants. These types of plants contain roots that expand and grow horizontally. The leaves of the Boltonia ellipsium do not get produced when the flowering phase is taking place. The plant is seen to grow well in soil varieties and mostly require full sunlight.

This perennial plant has only been obtained primarily within Aiken, South Carolina. However, there have been several sightings of this plant within the Carolina Bay and in Georgia, and partially into North Carolina. Although this specific species has been found recently, there are other species questioned to be related to the Boltonia ellipsium. One of the species that is seen to be related is Boltonia annua. Similarly to B. ellipsium, it is also found within the Bay throughout the Carolinas, but may differ in ways such as characteristics involving structure.

== Cultivation ==
Specific cultivation requirements for Boltonia ellipsium have not been established in published horticultural sources. The species occurs naturally in wetland habitats such as Carolina bays, pond margins, and depression meadows. Herbarium records document populations in areas more prone to seasonal flooding and fluctuating water levels.

Cultivation information is available for other members of the genus. Boltonia asteroides is grown in full sun and can tolerate a range of soil conditions, while Boltonia caroliniana is associated with moist soils and is recommended for rain gardens and pond margins. These observations may provide useful comparisons, but the cultivation requirements of B. ellipsium have not been independently established yet.
