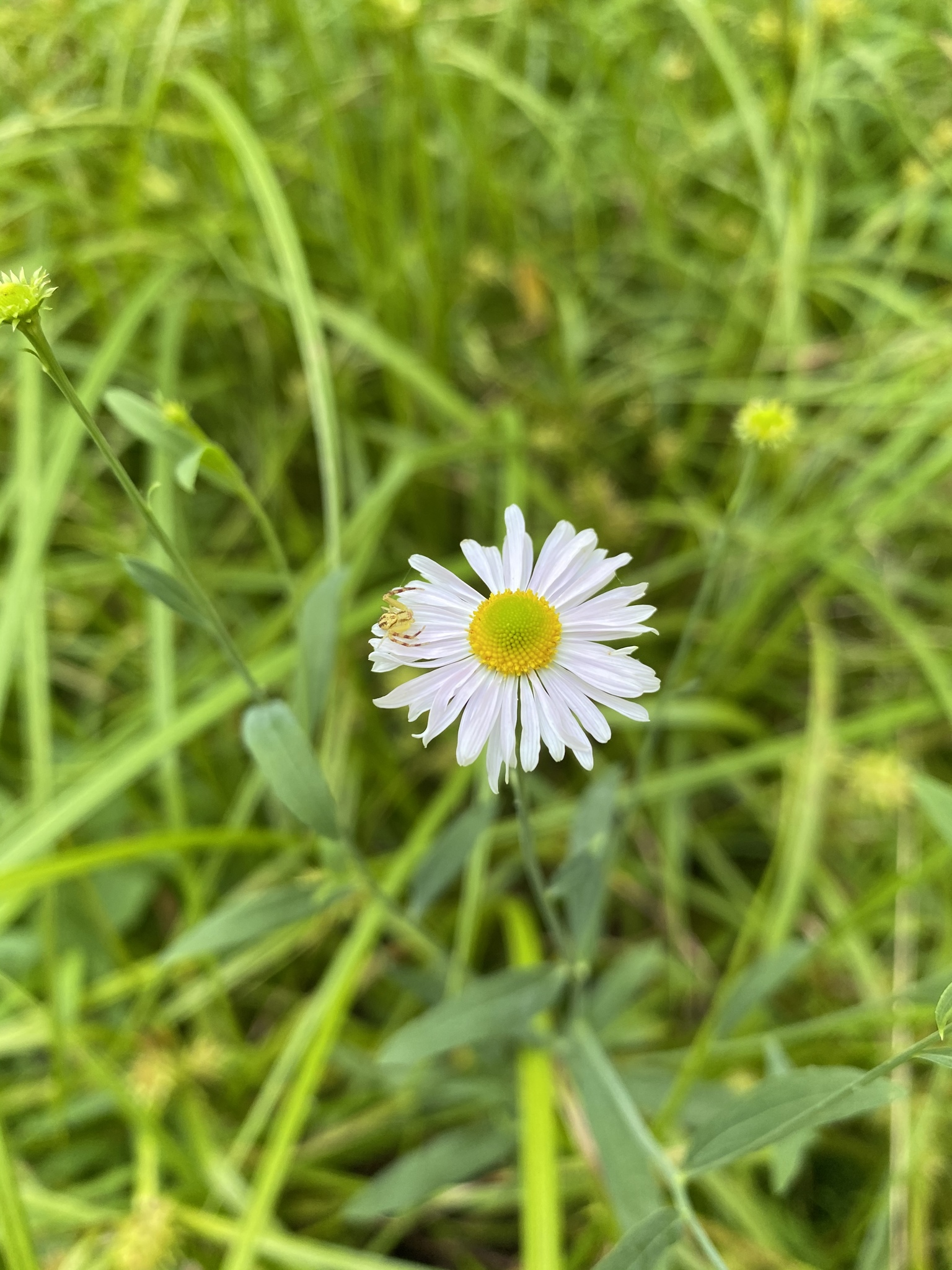

Conservation status
- Imperiled (NatureServe)

Scientific classification
- Kingdom: Plantae
- Clade: Embryophytes
- Clade: Tracheophytes
- Clade: Spermatophytes
- Clade: Angiosperms
- Clade: Eudicots
- Clade: Asterids
- Order: Asterales
- Family: Asteraceae
- Genus: Boltonia
- Species: B. montana

Binomial name
- Boltonia montana J.F. Townsend & Karaman-Castro

= Boltonia montana =

Species of flowering plant

Boltonia montana, the mountain doll's daisy, is a North American species of plants in the family Asteraceae. It is found only in the east-central part of the United States, in the states of New Jersey, Pennsylvania, and Virginia.

Boltonia montana is a perennial herb up to 150 cm (60 inches) tall. It has many daisy-like flower heads with pink or lavender ray florets and yellow disc florets.

Boltonia montana is critically imperiled in New Jersey and Virginia, and is possibly extirpated in Pennsylvania. In 2010, there were only 11 occurrences. The long term trend is a decline of 30-50%. It is not a U.S. Endangered Species.
