= Boltonia apalachicolensis =

Conservation status
- Imperiled (NatureServe)

Scientific classification
- Kingdom: Plantae
- Clade: Tracheophytes
- Clade: Angiosperms
- Clade: Eudicots
- Clade: Asterids
- Order: Asterales
- Family: Asteraceae
- Genus: Boltonia
- Species: B. apalachicolensis

Binomial name
- Boltonia apalachicolensis L.C.Anderson

Species of flowering plant

Boltonia apalachicolensis, common name Apalachicola doll's-daisy, is a North American species of plants in the family Asteraceae. It is found in the "panhandle" region of northwestern Florida, and has been found in south Louisiana, and Mississippi in the United States.

Boltonia apalachicolensis is a plant up to 180 cm (72 inches) tall. It has many daisy-like flower heads with white or lilac ray florets and yellow disc florets.

The counties in Florida that have Boltonia apalachicolensis are Franklin, Gulf, Liberty, and Washington.

The plant is imperiled in Florida, and critically imperiled in Mississippi and Louisiana.
