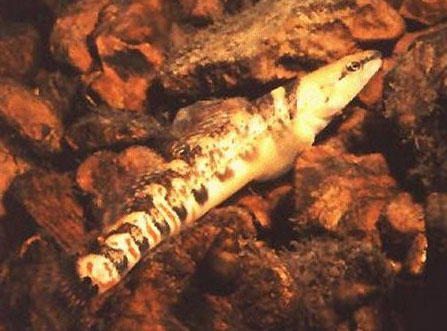

Conservation status
- Vulnerable (IUCN 3.1)

- Threatened (ESA)

Scientific classification
- Kingdom: Animalia
- Phylum: Chordata
- Class: Actinopterygii
- Order: Perciformes
- Family: Percidae
- Genus: Etheostoma
- Species: E. nianguae

Binomial name
- Etheostoma nianguae C. H. Gilbert & Meek, 1887

= Niangua darter =

Species of fish

The Niangua darter (Etheostoma nianguae) is a species of freshwater ray-finned fish, a darter from the subfamily Etheostomatinae, part of the family Percidae, which also contains the perches, ruffes and pikeperches. It is endemic to Missouri, United States. It is found only in the Osage River Basin of central Missouri where its range historically included the Sac River, Pomme de Terre River, Niangua River, Big Tavern Creek, and Maries River. It is a federally listed threatened species of the United States.

== Description ==
The Niangua darter is a slender, silvery-brown fish with about ten vertical dark bars with brown centers alternating with orange undulating lines. There are two small black spots at the base of the tail fin. The color is accentuated in breeding males which have bright orange and green bars along the flank and orange and green bands on the dorsal and tail fins. The maximum size of this fish is about 13 cm (5 in) but a more common size is 7.3 cm (3 in).

== Lifecycle ==
Adult Niangua darters move from pools and slow runs to gravel riffles prior to spawning. The spawning season runs from mid-March to early June, but most of the breeding occurs in April. After spawning, Niangua darters return to the pools and stream runs. Young darters can reach sexual maturity after one year and can live up to four years, but few survive longer than two years.

Niangua darters eat the nymphs of stoneflies and mayflies, and other aquatic insects.

== Distribution and habitat ==
Niangua darters live in clear upland creeks and small to medium-sized rivers with slight to moderate currents. They require continuously flowing streams with silt-free gravel and rock bottoms. These streams typically drain hilly areas with chert or dolomite bedrock. Niangua darters are found most of the year in shallow pools, margins, and stream runs.

Niangua darters occur only in Missouri in counties in the Osage River basin, including: Osage, Maries, Miller, Camden, Hickory, Dallas, Benton, Greene, Webster, Cedar, Polk, and St. Clair. The Niangua Darter was historically widespread and abundant in these rivers and streams.

== Cause of decline ==
The Niangua darter has declined in numbers during the last 30 years, primarily due to habitat loss from reservoir construction, and stream channelization. Reservoirs isolated populations of Niangua Darter and barred them from dispersing between suitable habitats. Land clearing and increased amounts of sediment and nutrients have also caused declines in Niangua Darter populations. As a consequence of these factors, the IUCN has listed this fish as being "Vulnerable".
