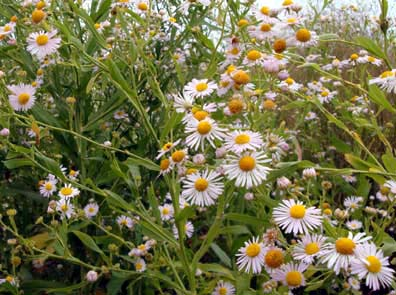

Conservation status
- Imperiled (NatureServe)

- Threatened (ESA)

Scientific classification
- Kingdom: Plantae
- Clade: Embryophytes
- Clade: Tracheophytes
- Clade: Spermatophytes
- Clade: Angiosperms
- Clade: Eudicots
- Clade: Asterids
- Order: Asterales
- Family: Asteraceae
- Genus: Boltonia
- Species: B. decurrens

Binomial name
- Boltonia decurrens (Torr. & A.Gray) Alph.Wood

= Boltonia decurrens =

Species of flowering plant

Boltonia decurrens is a rare species of flowering plant in the family Asteraceae known by the common names decurrent false aster and claspingleaf doll's daisy. It is native to the floodplains along the Illinois and Mississippi Rivers in the United States, where the habitat has been drastically altered, leading to its decline. The plant was once distributed across 400 kilometers of riverside forest from LaSalle, Illinois, to St. Louis, Missouri. As the rivers and riparian habitat alongside them have been developed, the plant's distribution has been fragmented into 40 to 43 separate populations. At one point it was thought to have been extirpated from Missouri, but a few populations have been located near St. Louis since the mid-1980s. Despite having declined over time, several populations of the plant contain many thousands of individuals. Populations vary depending on the amount and duration of flooding that occurs in the area each year. The plant is a federally listed threatened species.

This plant was long treated as a variety of Boltonia asteroides until 1985, when it was elevated to species status, a status it had held once before. It is a bushy perennial herb sprawling to 1.5 meters in height, often exceeding two meters. The leaves are decurrent, their bases extending down the stem at their attachment. The blades are up to 15 centimeters long and linear or lance-shaped. The inflorescence is a large panicle of leafy branches and many flower heads with white or pale purple ray florets measuring 1 to 2 centimeters long. The center contains many yellow disc florets. Flowering occurs in August through October. The plant reproduces vegetatively by growing new shoots and sexually by making seed. The species produces a large amount of seeds, averaging 50,000 per plant. The seeds are dispersed on the water, particularly during floods. In general the plant is adapted to floods; it has been noted to grow underwater, produce an inflorescence above the surface, bloom and produce seeds in flooded conditions. The seeds germinate when they fall on wet substrate, or sometimes while they are still floating about on the water.

Today the land next to the rivers is protected with many flood control methods, and natural floodplain activity occurs in few places. The riverside landscape has been modified into cropland, with marshes and prairies drained, walled off, and plowed. The rivers are contained with levees, controlled by locks, and accessed via marinas. While the plant is adapted to periodic flooding, its seedlings can only germinate and grow in clear water that allows sunlight in; flooding that occurs now is more likely to be turbid with silt, a condition the plant cannot tolerate. Recent large floods have been noted to deposit thick layers of silt, destroying plants. Also, the disturbance of flooding is rare enough now that riversides become overgrown with brush, shading out the plants in a similar way. In fact, in some areas the plant now depends on periodic human disturbance, such as mowing, to clear away the brush the way severe natural flooding once did.

Population sizes vary depending on the amount of disturbance, such as flooding, occurring in the area. Populations have been noted to contain anywhere between one plant and one million plants or more, and some populations disappear for a time. Several populations of the plant were noted to increase after the Great Flood of 1993, with the most severely swamped populations growing most. Genetic analysis reveals the species is genetically diverse.
