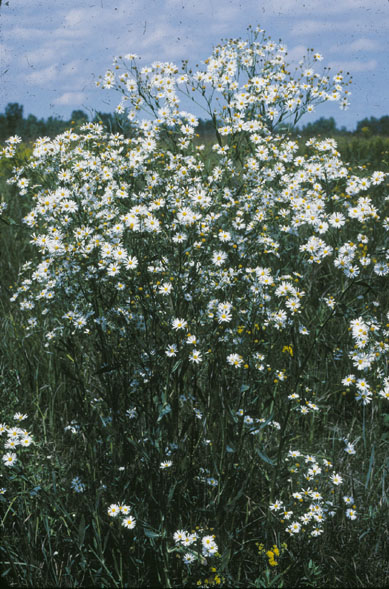
- Boltonia asteroides var. latisquama

Scientific classification
- Kingdom: Plantae
- Clade: Tracheophytes
- Clade: Angiosperms
- Clade: Eudicots
- Clade: Asterids
- Order: Asterales
- Family: Asteraceae
- Subfamily: Asteroideae
- Tribe: Astereae
- Subtribe: Boltoniinae
- Genus: Boltonia; L'Hér.

Type species
- Boltonia glastifolia (syn of B. asteroides) (Hill) L'Hér.

Synonyms
- Actartife Raf.; Cacotanis Raf.

= Boltonia (plant) =

Genus of flowering plants

Boltonia is a genus of plants in the family Asteraceae native primarily to North America with one species in eastern Asia.

== Species ==
Boltonia contains 8 species.

- Boltonia apalachicolensis - Apalachicola doll's daisy - Florida Panhandle
- Boltonia asteroides - white doll's daisy - USA (primarily Great Plains + Mississippi Valley, w scattered locations in eastern + northwestern US); Saskatchewan, Manitoba
- Boltonia caroliniana - Carolina doll's daisy - North + South Carolina, Georgia, Virginia
- Boltonia decurrens - claspingleaf doll's daisy, decurrent false aster - Illinois, Missouri, Iowa
- Boltonia diffusa - smallhead doll's daisy - United States (Southeast + Lower Mississippi Valley)
- Boltonia ellipsium - North America
- Boltonia lautureana - Japan, Korea, China, Russia (Primorye, Khabarovsk, Amur Oblast, Irkutsk, Zabaykalsky Krai)
- Boltonia montana - Pennsylvania, New Jersey, Virginia
