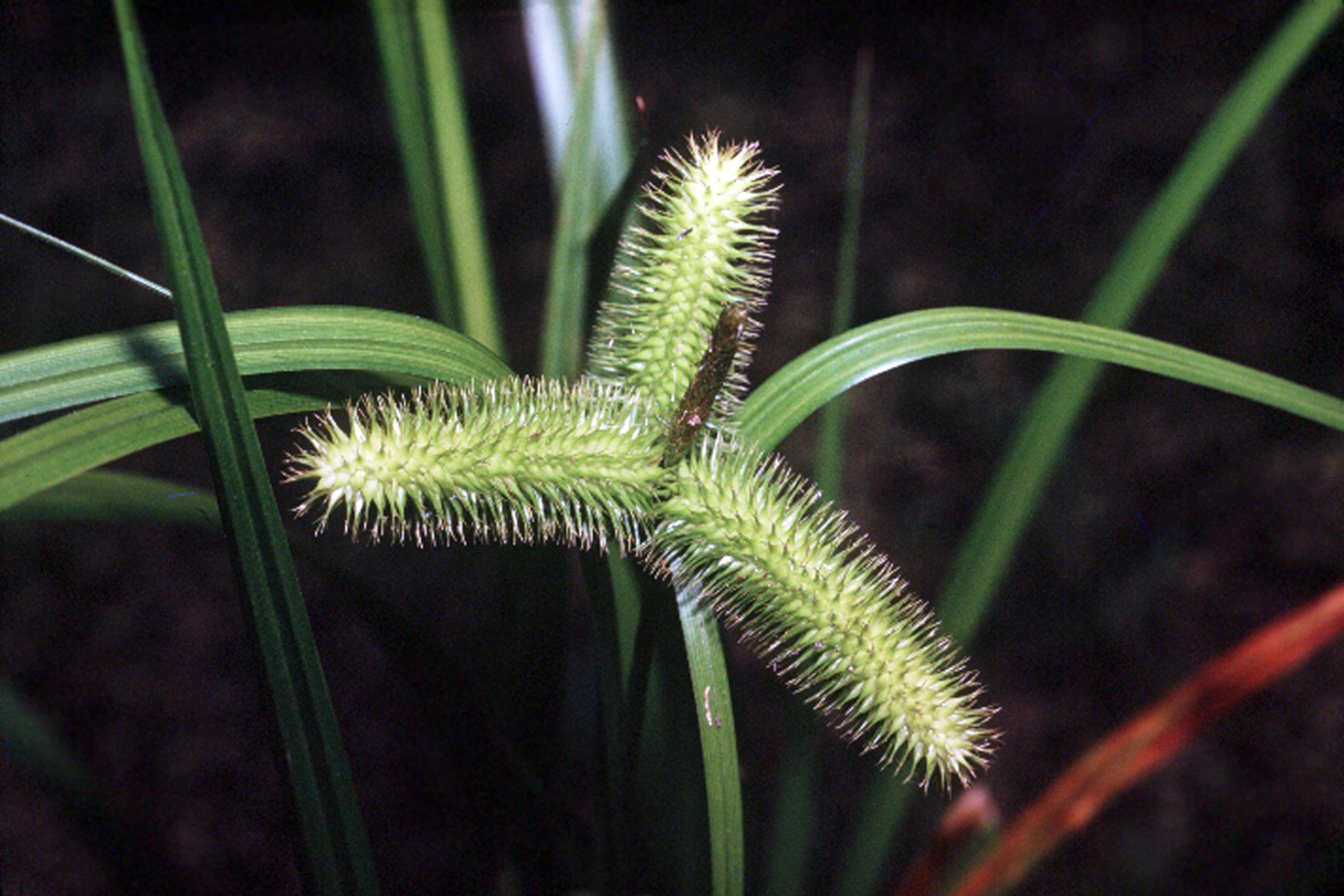

Scientific classification
- Kingdom: Plantae
- Clade: Tracheophytes
- Clade: Angiosperms
- Clade: Monocots
- Clade: Commelinids
- Order: Poales
- Family: Cyperaceae
- Genus: Carex
- Section: Carex sect. Vesicariae
- Species: C. comosa

Binomial name
- Carex comosa Boott

= Carex comosa =

Species of grass-like plant

Carex comosa is a species of sedge known as longhair sedge and bristly sedge. It is native to North America, where it grows in western and eastern regions of Canada and the United States, and parts of Mexico. It prefers loamy or sandy soil, and grows in meadows, along lake shores and river banks, and also in many types of wetlands. Carex comosa tolerates deeper water than most common species and is good for retention basins. This sedge produces clumps of triangular stems up to 100 or 120 centimeters tall from short rhizomes. The inflorescence is up to 35 centimeters long and has a long bract which is longer than the spikes. It is a cluster of several cylindrical spikes. The scales over the fruits taper into long, thin awns.
