= Pleasant River, Nova Scotia =

Community in Nova Scotia, Canada

Coordinates: 44°26′15.73″N 64°53′0.73″W

Pleasant River in Nova Scotia

Pleasant River is a community in the Canadian province of Nova Scotia, located in the Region of Queens Municipality.

Pleasant River was first settled by a man named Zenas Waterman Sr. in October, 1802. On 4 August 1856, a church was opened in Pleasant River. A gold mine called the "Pleasant River Barrens" operated here from 1890 until its closure in 1913.

The population of Pleasant River in 1956 was 97.
