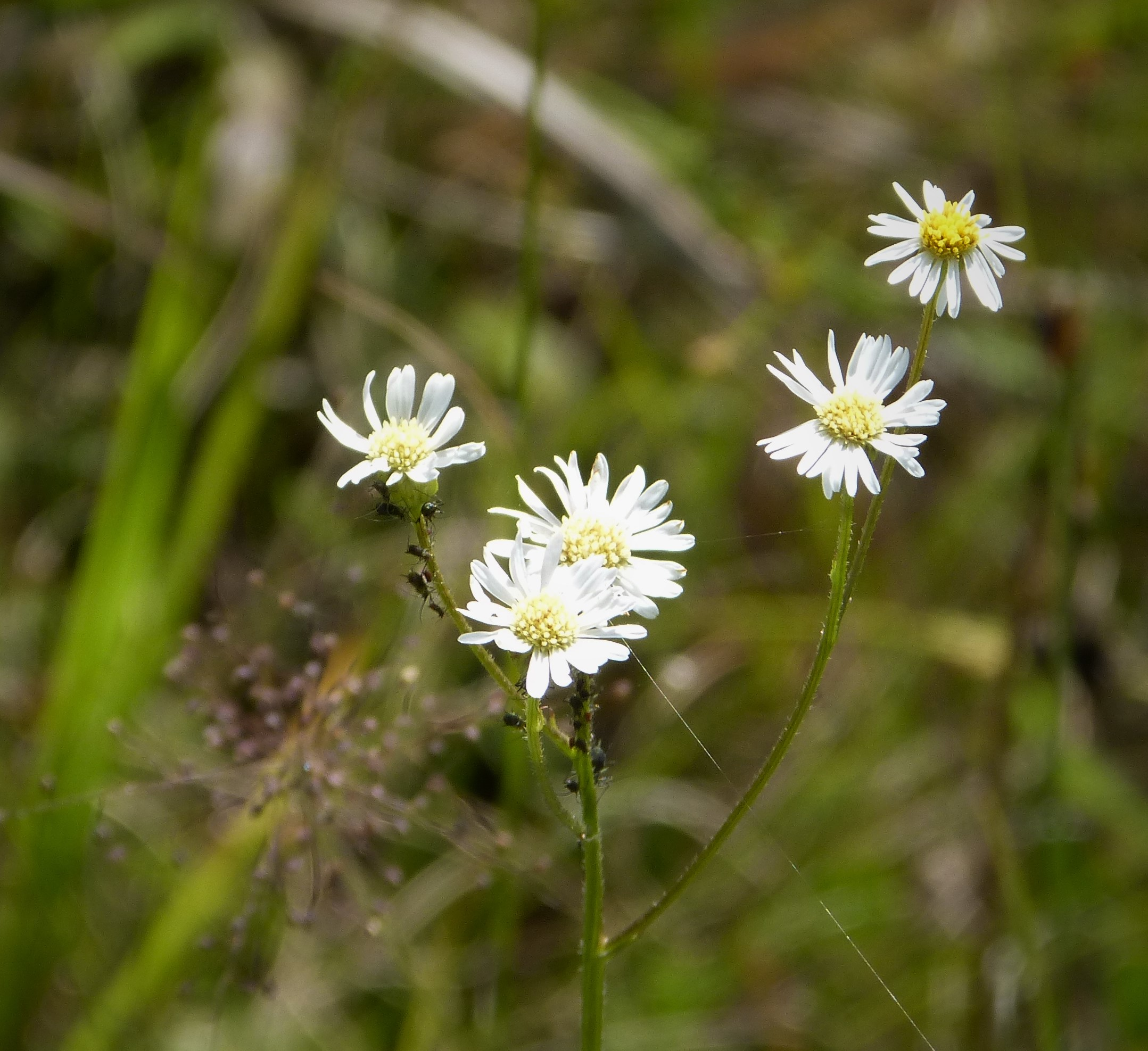

Conservation status
- Apparently Secure (NatureServe)

Scientific classification
- Kingdom: Plantae
- Clade: Embryophytes
- Clade: Tracheophytes
- Clade: Spermatophytes
- Clade: Angiosperms
- Clade: Eudicots
- Clade: Asterids
- Order: Asterales
- Family: Asteraceae
- Genus: Boltonia
- Species: B. diffusa

Binomial name
- Boltonia diffusa Elliott

Synonyms
- Cacotanis ciliata Raf.; Boltonia interior (Fernald & Griscom) G.N.Jones, syn of var. interior

= Boltonia diffusa =

Species of flowering plant

Boltonia diffusa, the smallhead doll's daisy, is a North American species of plants in the family Asteraceae. It is native to the United States, primarily the states along the Gulf of Mexico from Texas to Florida plus the lower Mississippi Valley from Louisiana to Illinois. There additional populations in the eastern United States as far north as Virginia.

Boltonia diffusa is a small perennial rarely more than 20 cm (8 inches) high. It spreads by stolons (horizontal stems running along the surface of the ground). It has many daisy-like flower heads with white or lavender ray florets and yellow disc florets.

Varieties

- Boltonia diffusa var. diffusa - coastal regions and Mississippi Valley
- Boltonia diffusa var. interior Fernald & Griscom - Mississippi Valley
