= Apliu Street =

Street in Sham Shui Po, Hong Kong

Coordinates: 22.33031°N 114.16205°E

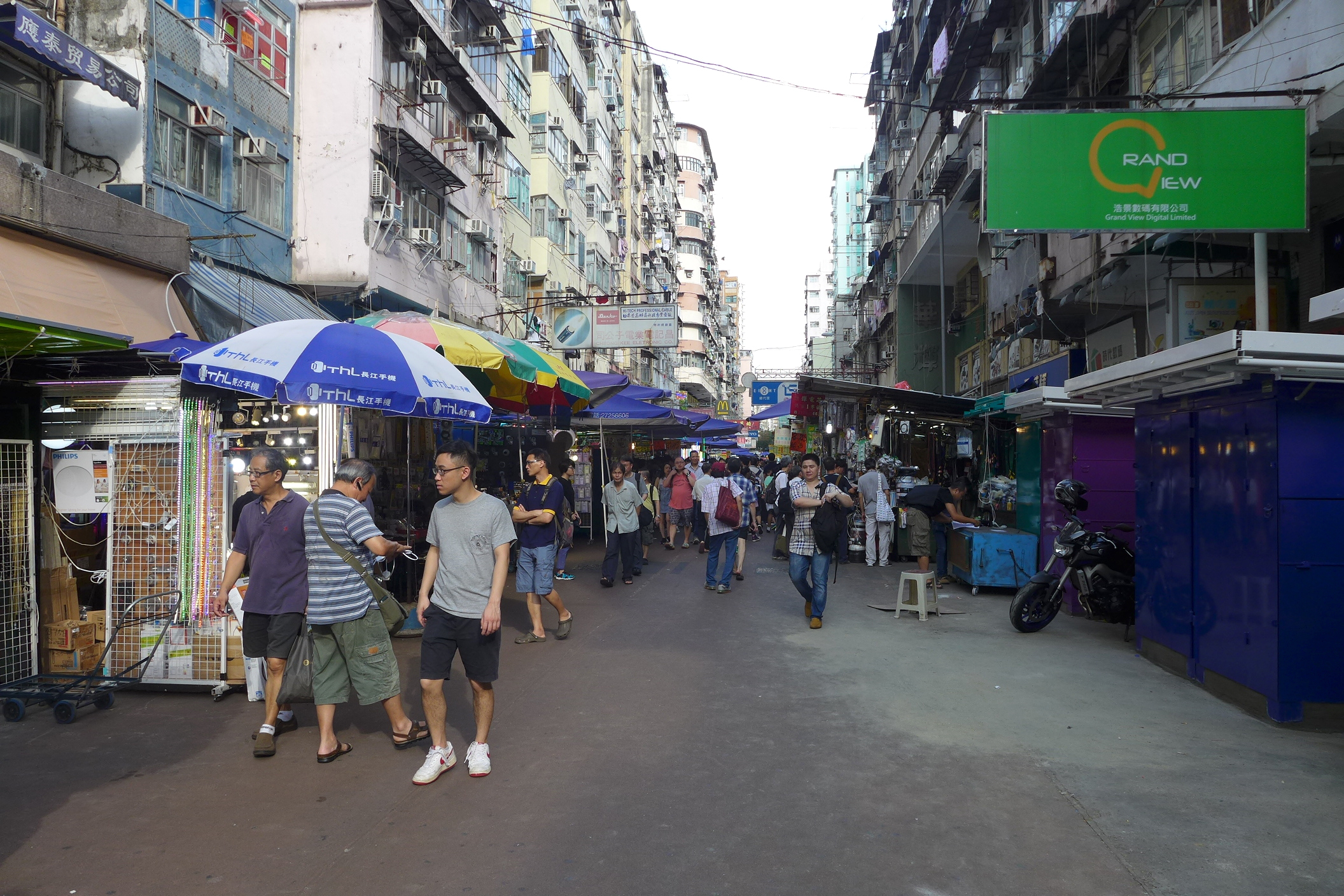
- The market in Apliu Street (2015)
- Interactive map of Apliu Street
- Native name: 鴨寮街
- Maintained by: Highways Department
- Location: Sham Shui Po, Hong Kong

Apliu Street
- Traditional Chinese: 鴨寮街
Transcriptions
Yue: Cantonese
- Yale Romanization: Aap lìuh gāai
- Jyutping: Aap^{3} liu^{4} gaai^{1}

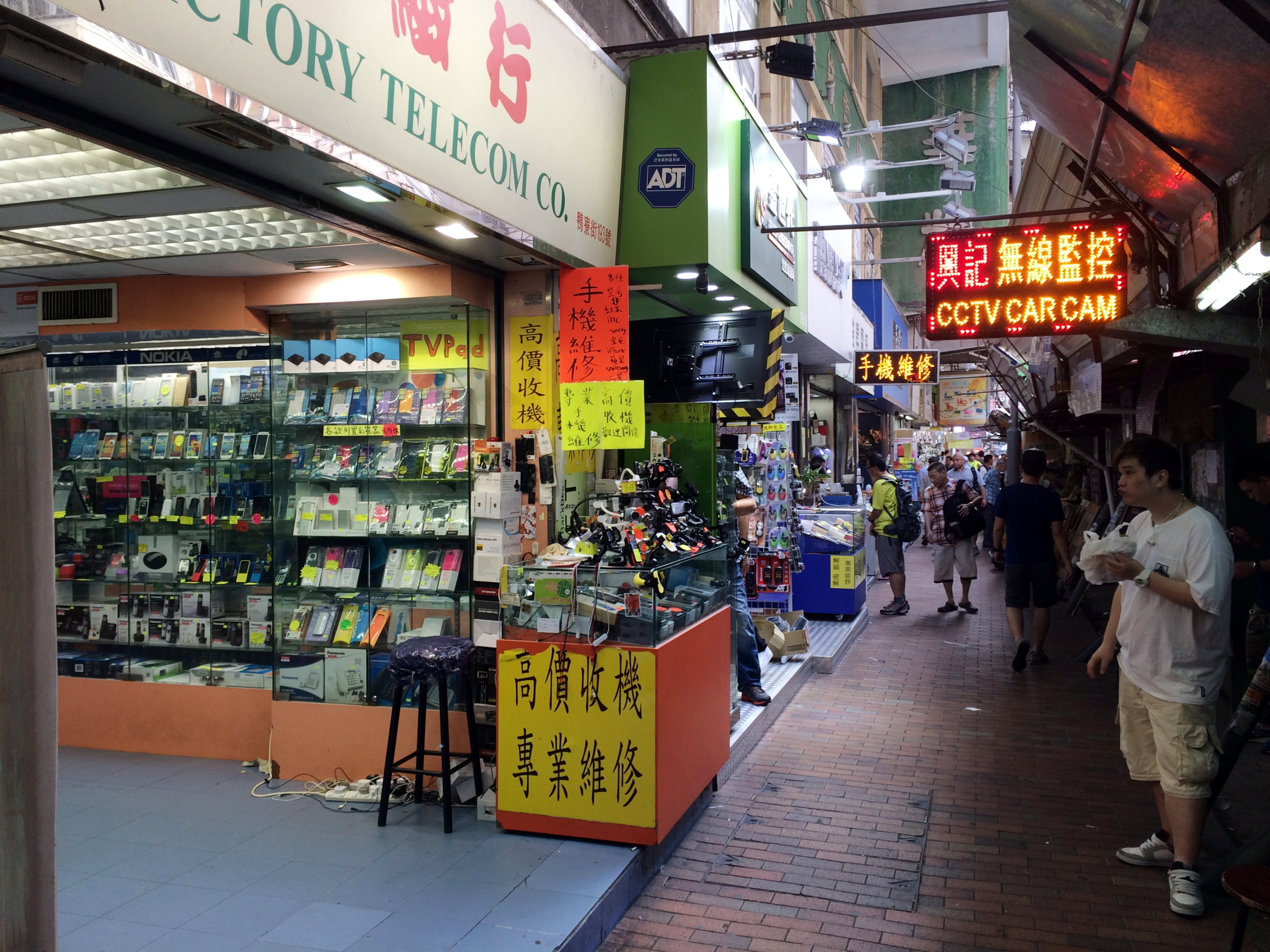
Shops in Apliu Street

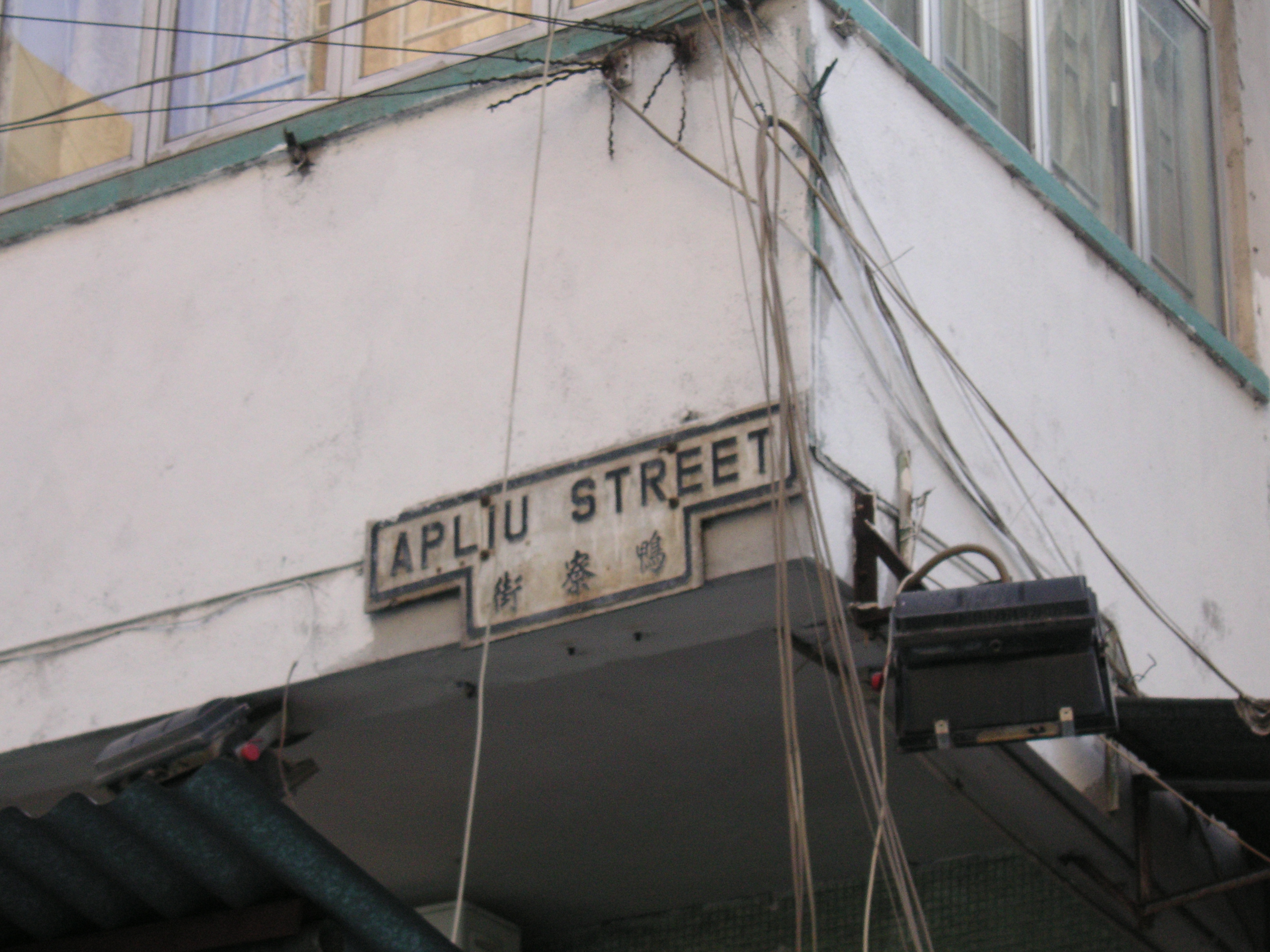
Old style road sign of Apliu Street

Apliu Street (Chinese: 鴨寮街; Jyutping: aap3 liu4 gaai1) is a street in the Sham Shui Po area of Kowloon, Hong Kong.

== Location ==
Apliu Street runs parallel to Cheung Sha Wan Road between Yen Chow Street and Nam Cheong Street. An easy way to reach it is to get off at the MTR Sham Shui Po station. Use the A2 or C2 exit and you will be ascending directly into Apliu Street.

== Name ==
The Cantonese name "ap liu" (鴨寮) comes from a village which was formerly located nearby but has long since been buried underneath the urbanization of Sham Shui Po.

== Retail ==
Apliu Street is home to a bustling street market selling electronics, electrical components, and related items. A shopper can find both new and used merchandise in the area. Apliu Street is well known for geek shopping, and at one time it had an unsavoury reputation as a "thieves' market".

While Apliu Street is famous for electronic parts, the Golden Shopping Arcade on the opposite side of Cheung Sha Wan Road is famous for computer hardware, video games, and related items.

== Trivia ==
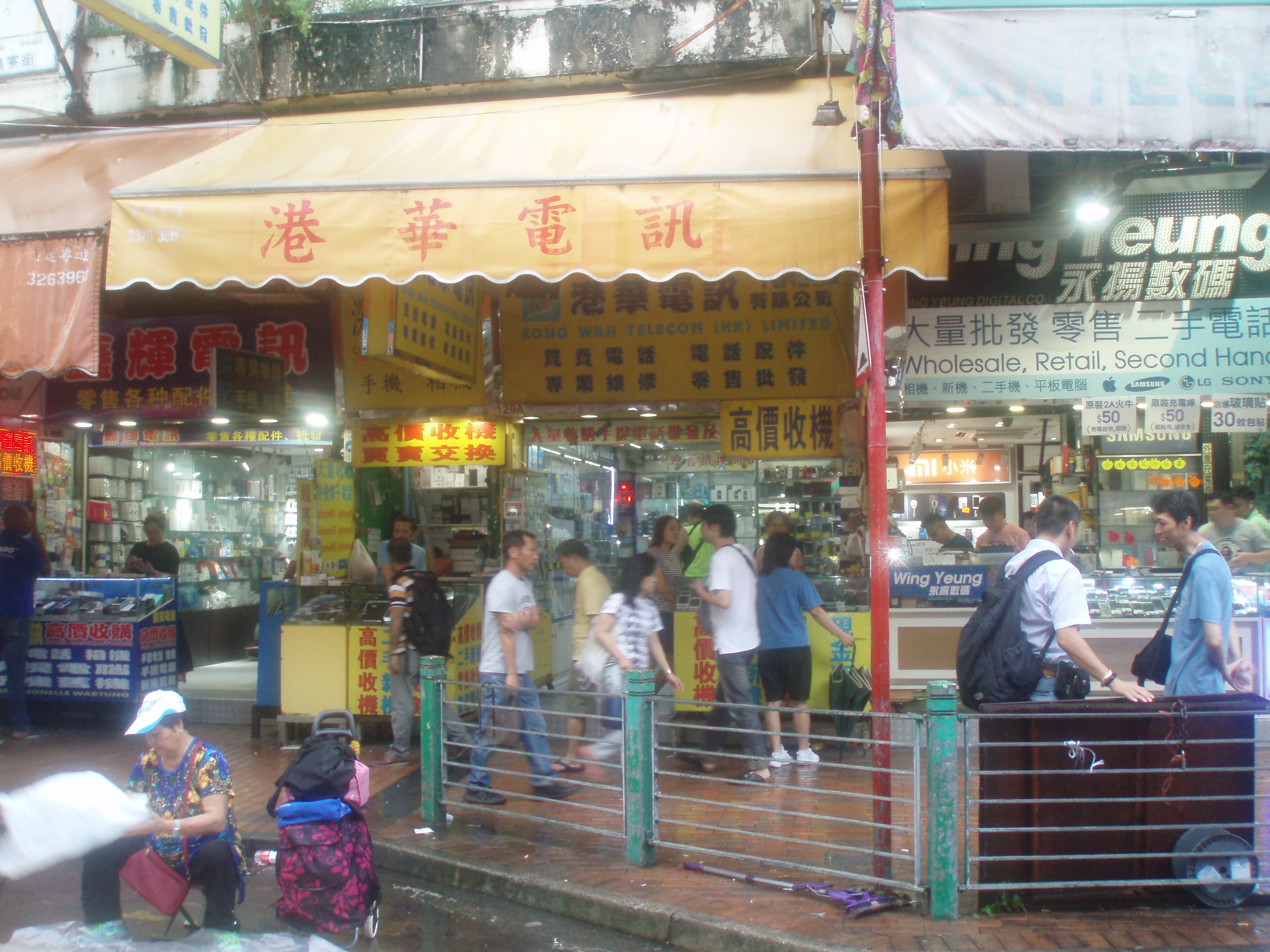
Kong Wah Telecom (HK) Limited on this street was visited by the American TV show The Amazing Race 27.

The shop Kong Wah Telecom (HK) Limited (near the junction of Kweilin Street) was a site of the Detour in the eleventh leg of the reality TV show The Amazing Race 27.

== See also ==
- Shia Wong Hip, a restaurant specialising in snake dishes located on Apliu Street
- List of streets and roads in Hong Kong
