= Nam Cheong Street =

Street in Hong Kong

Coordinates: 22°19′59.0766″N 114°9′59.94″E

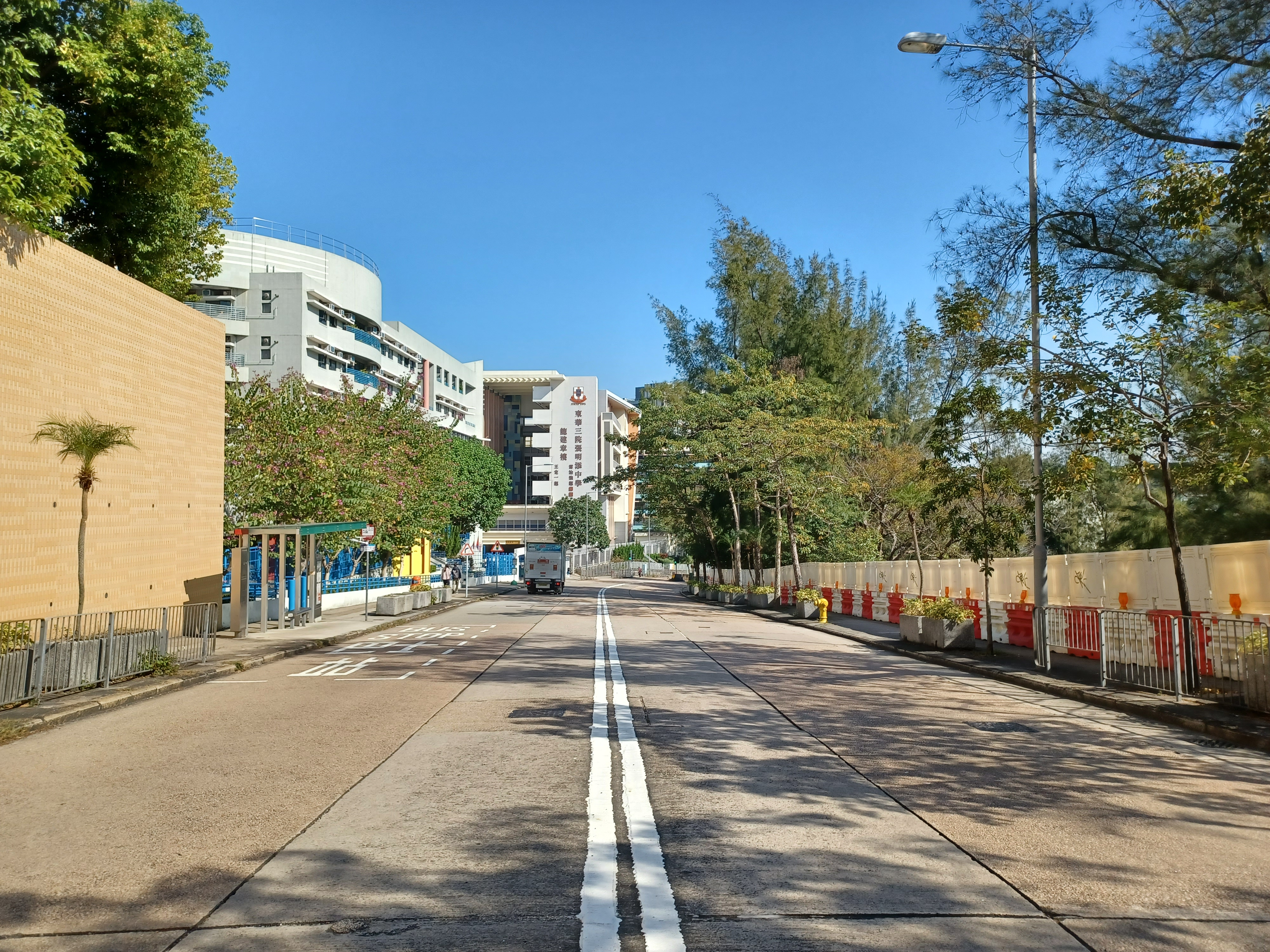
- Nam Cheong Street near Tung Wah Group of Hospitals Chang Ming Thien College
- Interactive map of Nam Cheong Street
- Native name: 南昌街 (Chinese)
- Namesake: An announcement on No. 616 of Hong Kong Government Gazette on 14 April 1961
- Type: Street
- Length: 1.7 mi (2.7 km)
- Width: 4 lanes
- Location: Sham Shui Po, Hong Kong
- From: Lung Ping Road and Yan Ping Road
- To: Tung Chau Street and Boundary Street

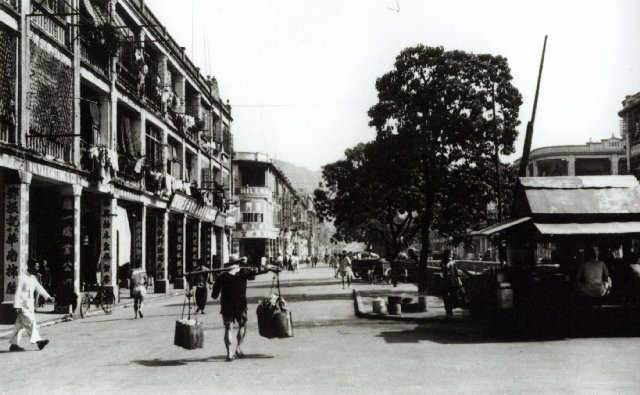
Nam Cheong Street in 1950.

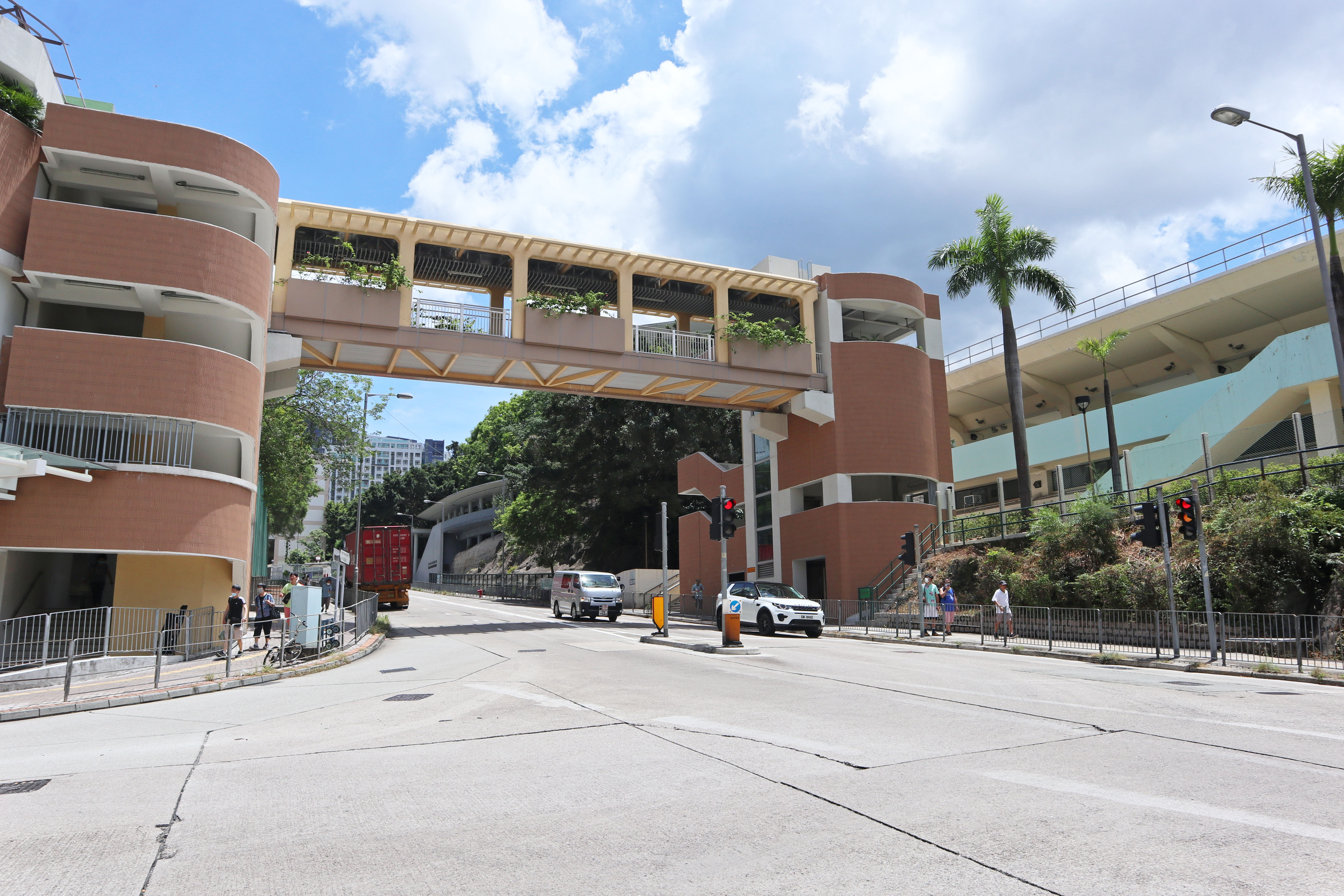
A pedestrian bridge on Nam Cheong Street linking to Shek Kip Mei Park

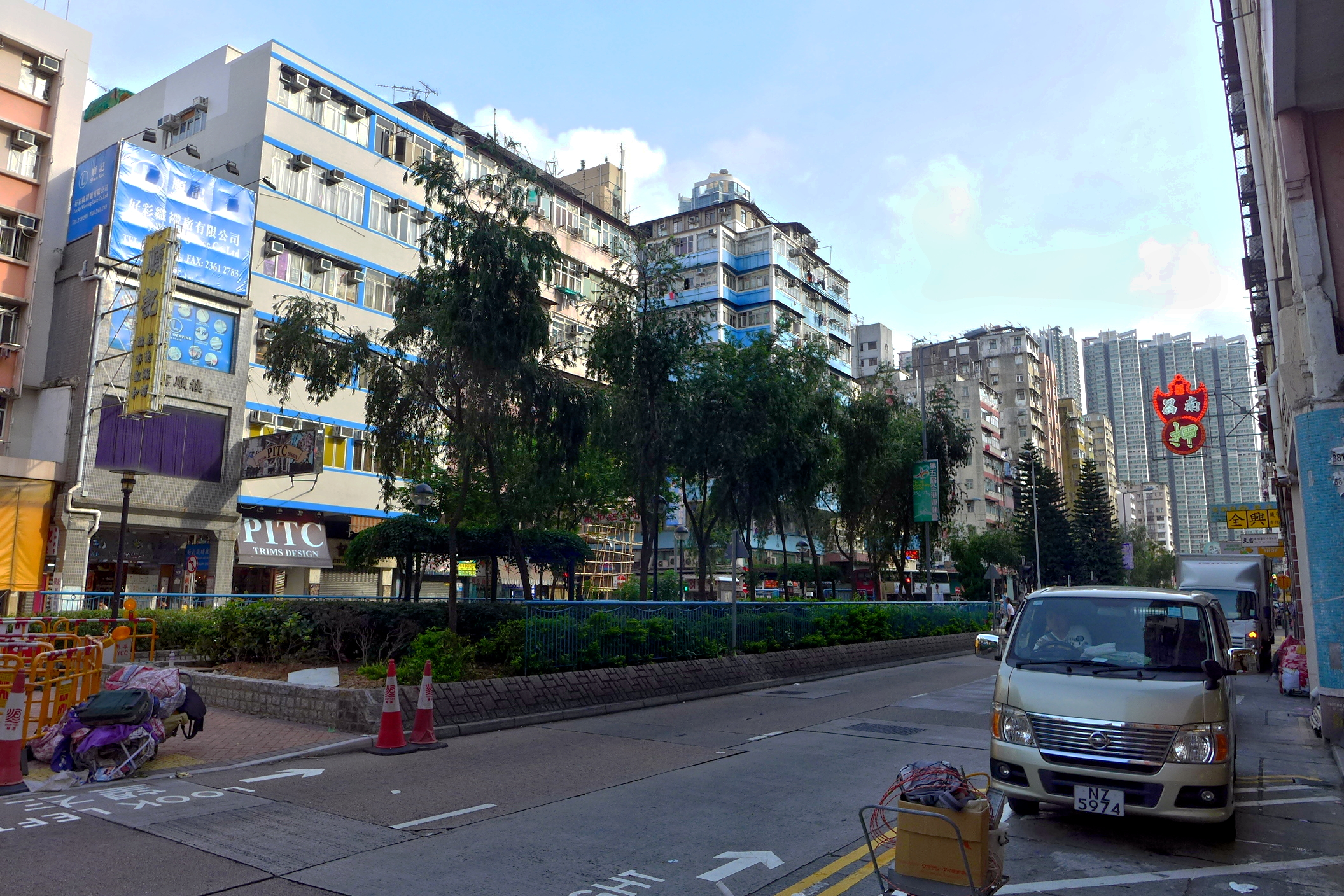
At Apliu Street

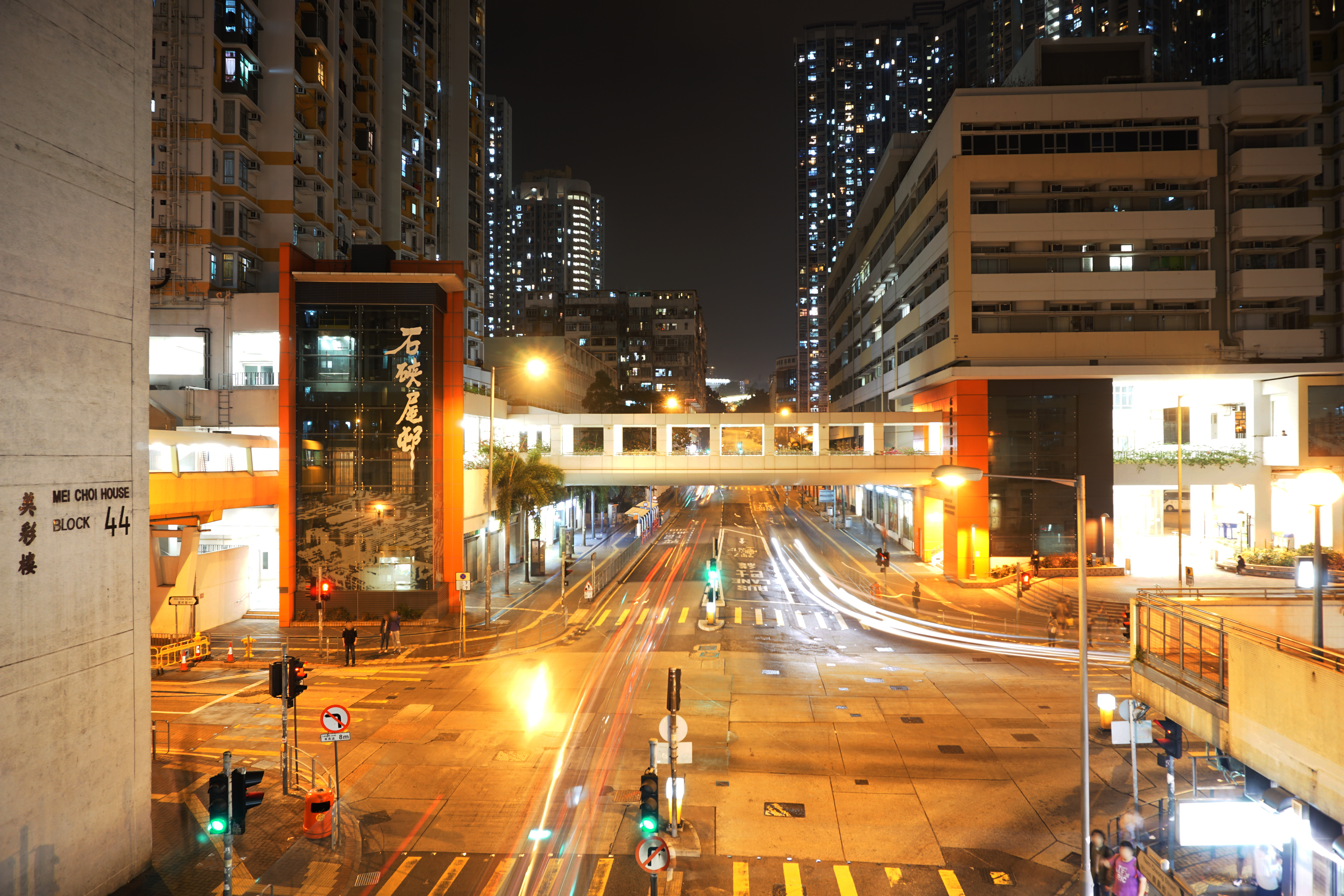
Shek Kip Mei Estate

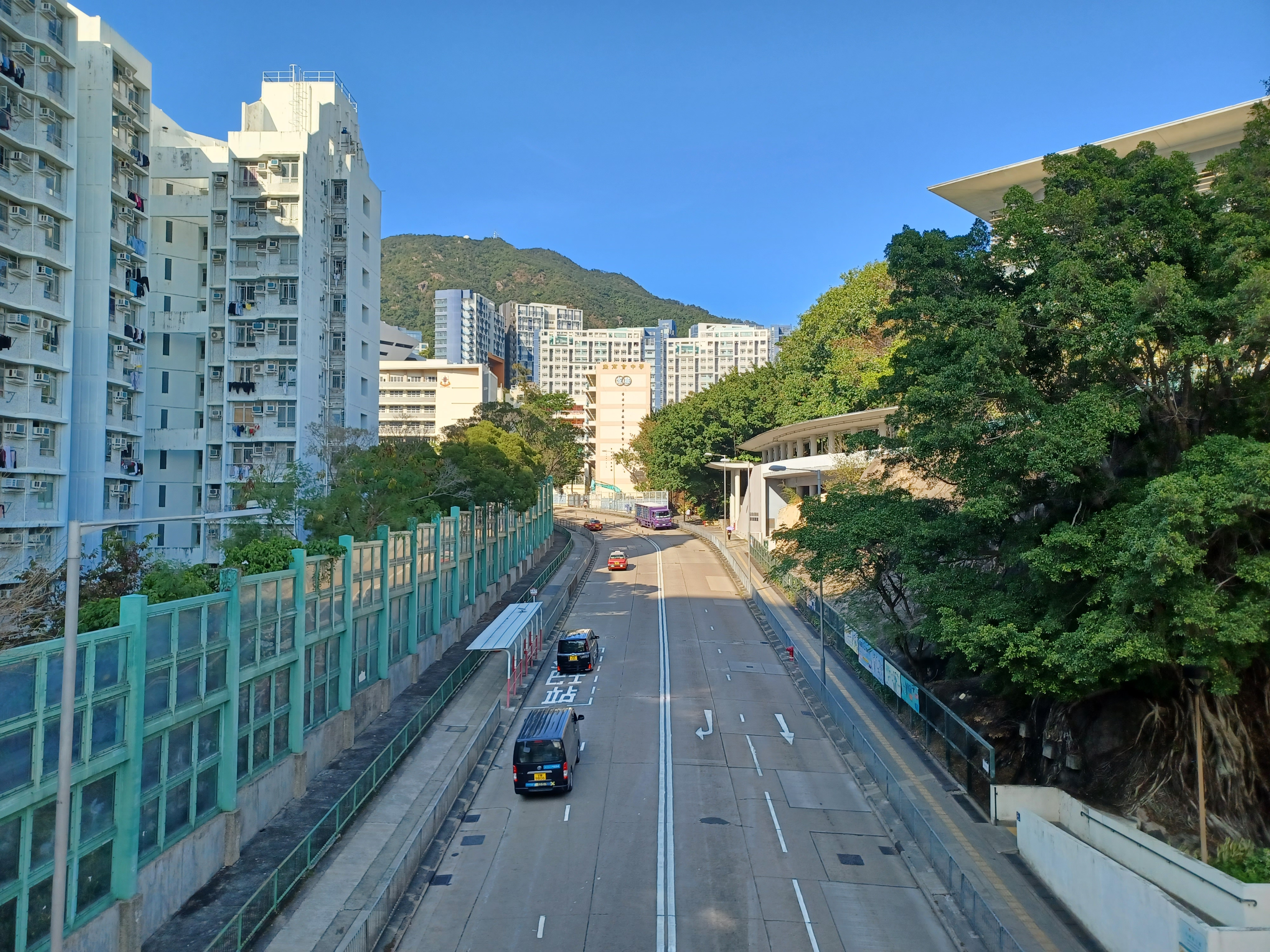
Pak Tin Estate

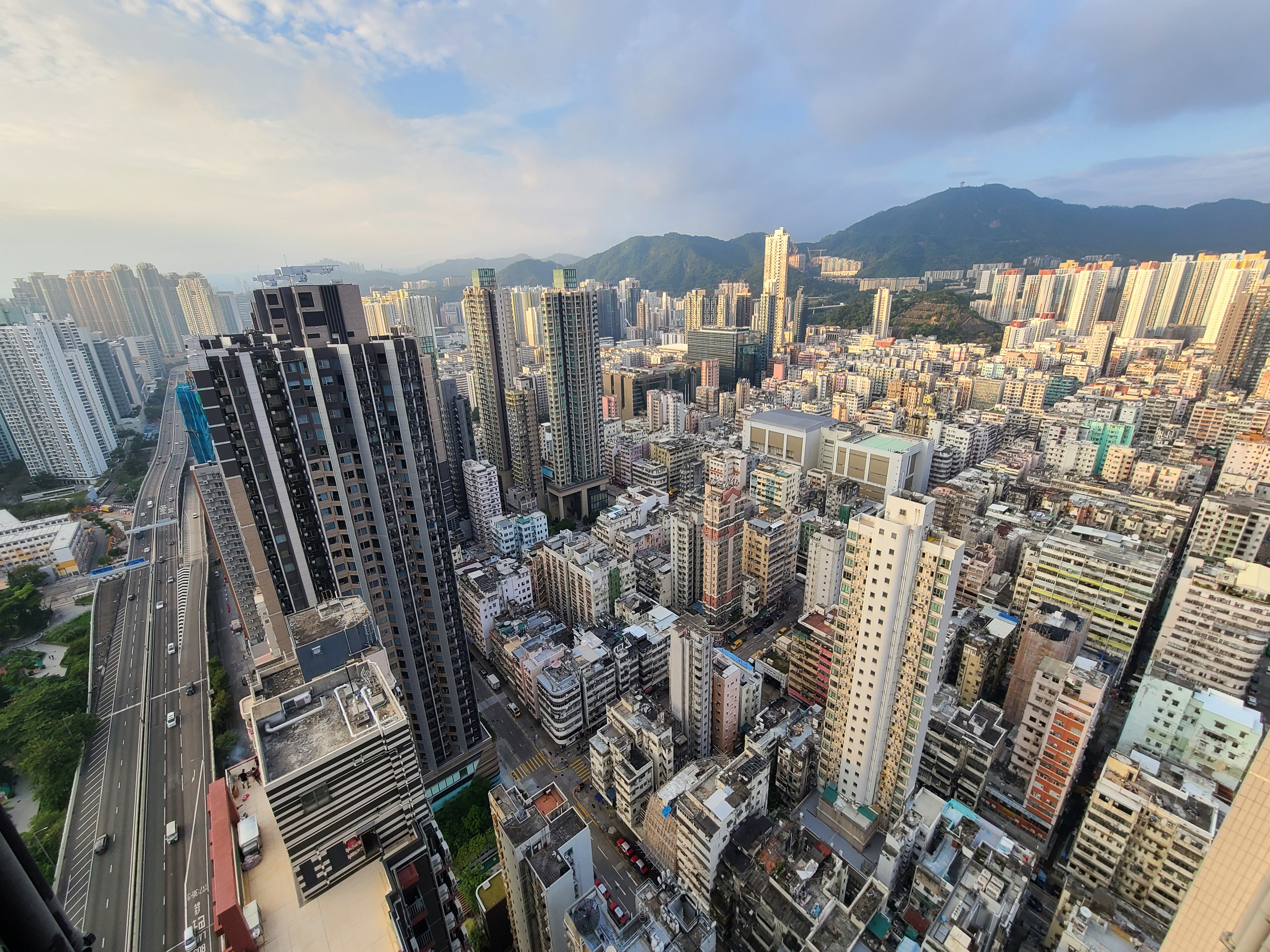
Overlook of Sham Shui Po from Nam Cheong Street

Nam Cheong Street (Chinese: 南昌街) is a street in Shek Kip Mei and Sham Shui Po, Sham Shui Po District, Kowloon, Hong Kong. It begins in the north at Lung Ping Road and Yan Ping Road in Shek Kip Mei and terminates in the south at Tung Chau Street and Boundary Street in Sham Shui Po. At first, it was known as Nan Chang Street, and later Nanchang Street.

== Etymology ==
Nam Cheong Street takes its name from Nanchang, a city in China. Most streets in Sham Shui Po are named after Chinese cities. A map from 1920 showed new urban development in Sham Shui Po, with a section of the street from Apliu Street to the reclamation frontage of Tung Chau Street named Nan Chang Street. At the seafront junction, it was also intended to connect with the junction of Boundary Street and Chung King Street in Fuk Tsun Heung.

Its Cantonese and current English names are very similar to that of Chan Nam Chong (Cantonese: 陳南昌), a tycoon and philanthropist in Hong Kong. There has been some speculation attributing the name’s origin to him, although this is not supported by historical records.

A section of Nam Cheong Street at Ki Lung Street has wholesale, retail, ribbon, and zipper shops. Therefore, it is called lace street.

Parkone (Chinese: 南昌一號; lit. 'No. 1 Nam Cheong'), Nam Cheong Estate, Nam Cheong station, Nam Cheong Place (南昌薈, formerly Fu Cheong Shopping Centre 富昌商場) and Nam Cheong Park are all named after the street. Apart from Parkone, all of these features are located south of the southern end of Nam Cheong Street.

== History ==
Nam Cheong Street was laid out in the 1920s, although its appearance in a 1920 map suggests that it might be earlier. The British obtained a lease for the New Territories from Imperial China in 1898. British Kowloon was poised for expansion across the boundary into the New Kowloon. In 1906, the Hong Kong government began constructing a new town, Sham Shui Po, adjacent to Fuk Tsun Heung, through reclamation. The works were completed in the 1910s, including the construction of Nam Cheong Street.

== Overview ==
Nam Cheong street features many old Chinese-style buildings and shops. From Un Chau Street to Tung Chau Street, there are only six parking spots among its two lanes.

The section from Wai Lun Street to Cornwall Street is a big slope. There is also a Transport Department center at Nam Cheong Street.

== Redevelopment ==
Developers had already acquired or own tenement buildings/tong lau and would demolished them and turn them into luxury residential or commercial buildings. Buildings currently under construction are Parkone, Nam Cheong Street and Berwick Street and Yiu Tung Street etc. The view of the street has changed over time.

== Features ==
Features from south to north include:

- Park One (#1)
- 14 Nam Cheong Street (#14)
- 117-125 Nam Cheong Street (#117-125). A row of tong lau listed as Grade III historic buildings.
  - No. 117 houses a pawnshop named Nam Cheong Pawnshop (南昌押)
- Shek Kip Mei Estate
- Pak Tin Ambulance Depot. At the corner with Pak Wan Street
- Pak Tin Estate
- Shek Kip Mei Park
- Tung Wah Group of Hospitals Chang Ming Thien College (#300)
- Shek Kip Mei Fire Station (#380)

== Intersections ==
Intersections from south to north:

- Tung Chau Street
- Boundary Street
- Hai Tan Street
- Yee Kuk Street
- Lai Chi Kok Road
- Tai Nan Street
- Ki Lung Street
- Yu Chau Street
- Apliu Street
- Cheung Sha Wan Road
- Fuk Wah Street
- Fuk Wing Street
- Un Chau Street
- Tai Po Road
- Yiu Tung Street
- Berwick Street
- Woh Chai Street
- Wai Chi Street
- Wai Lun Street
- Tai Hang Sai Street
- Pak Wan Street
- Chak On Road S
- Lung Yuet Road
- Tai Po Road
- Ching Cheung Road
- Chak On Road
- Lung Ping Road
- Tai Woh Ping Road
- Lung Cheung Road

== In popular culture ==
"The Prince Near You" (Chinese: 南昌街王子, "The Prince of Nam Cheong Street") is a song by Fiona Sit composed and written by Terence Lam and Wyman Wong, respectively.

== See also ==
- List of streets and roads in Hong Kong
