= Tavern Creek (Missouri River tributary) =

Stream in the American state of Missouri

Tavern Creek is a stream in St. Louis, Franklin and St. Charles counties of east central Missouri. It is a tributary of the Fiddle Creek.

The stream headwaters are located at 38°33′41″N 90°42′05″W and the confluence with Fiddle Creek is at 38°35′09″N 90°46′05″W. The source area of the stream is in St. Louis County just northwest of Missouri Route 100 near the community of Hollow. The stream flows northwest and west into Franklin County and enters the Missouri River Valley just northeast of St. Albans where it joins Fiddle Creek.

Tavern Creek took its name from nearby Tavern Rock Cave, a cave which provided shelter to French pioneers.

== See also ==
- List of rivers of Missouri
