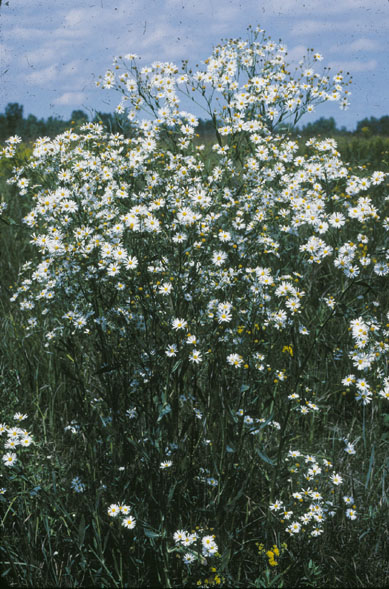

Conservation status
- Secure (NatureServe)

Scientific classification
- Kingdom: Plantae
- Clade: Embryophytes
- Clade: Tracheophytes
- Clade: Spermatophytes
- Clade: Angiosperms
- Clade: Eudicots
- Clade: Asterids
- Order: Asterales
- Family: Asteraceae
- Genus: Boltonia
- Species: B. asteroides

Binomial name
- Boltonia asteroides (L.) L'Hér. 1789 not Michx. 1803 nor Sims 1825

Synonyms
- Actartife angustifolia Raf.; Actartife cuneifolia Raf.; Matricaria asteroides L.; Boltonia glastifolia (Hill) L'Hér., syn of var. asteroides; Boltonia latisquama A.Gray, syn of var. latisquama; Boltonia occidentalis (A.Gray) Howell, syn of var. recognita; Boltonia recognita (Fernald & Griscom) G.N.Jones, syn of var. recognita

= Boltonia asteroides =

Species of flowering plant

Boltonia asteroides, the white doll's daisy, false chamomile, or false aster, is a species of plant native to the United States and Canada. It is found primarily in the Mississippi Valley and Great Plains from Saskatchewan south to Texas and Florida, with isolated populations in the eastern United States. Reports of the species in New England, New York, and the Pacific Northwest appear to be introductions.

Boltonia asteroides is a robust, 16″ to 78″ tall (40 cm to 198 cm), perennial. It spreads by stolons (horizontal stems running along the surface of the ground). It has many daisy-like flower heads with white or lavender ray florets and yellow disc florets.

The species is sometimes cultivated as an ornamental plant because of its attractive flowers.

Varieties

- Boltonia asteroides var. asteroides - coastal regions
- Boltonia asteroides var. latisquama (A.Gray) Cronquist - Great Plains, Mississippi Valley
- Boltonia asteroides var. recognita (Fernald & Griscom) Cronquist - Great Plains, Mississippi Valley, Ohio Valley, Canadian Prairie Provinces; introduced in New England + Pacific Northwest
