= Tong lau =

Type of East Asian tenement

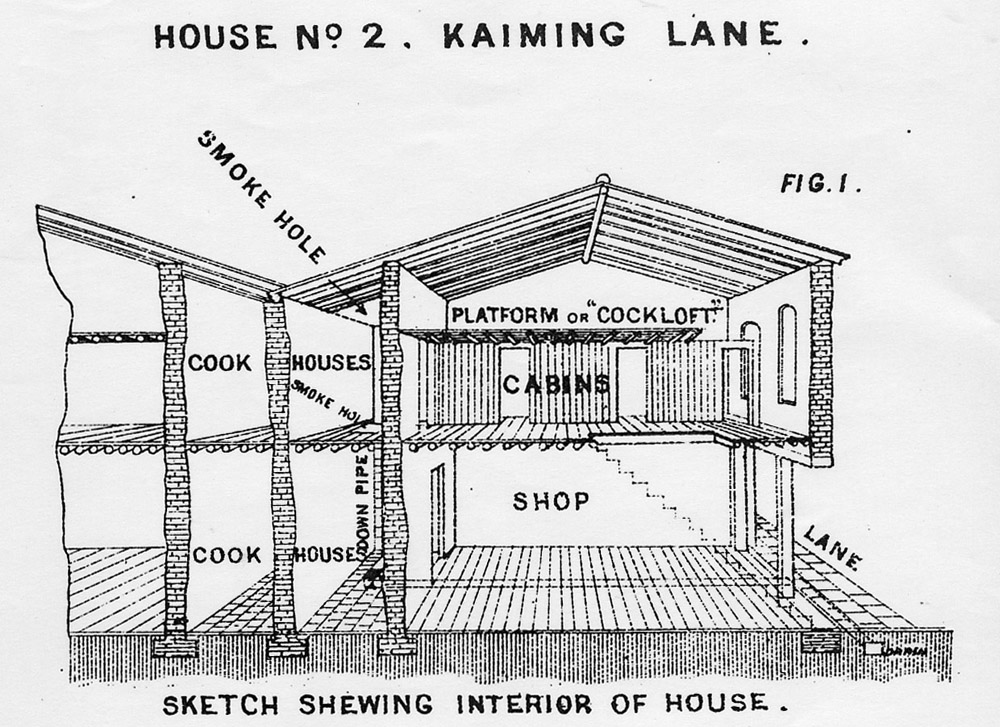
- A structural drawing of a tong lau. Illustrated by O. Chadwick, 1882.
- Traditional Chinese: 唐樓
Transcriptions
Standard Mandarin
- Hanyu Pinyin: Táng Lóu
Yue: Cantonese
- Yale Romanization: Tòhng láu
- Jyutping: Tong4 lau4*2

Ke lau
- Traditional Chinese: 騎樓
Transcriptions
Standard Mandarin
- Hanyu Pinyin: Qílóu
Yue: Cantonese
- Yale Romanization: Kèh láu
- Jyutping: Ke4 lau4*2

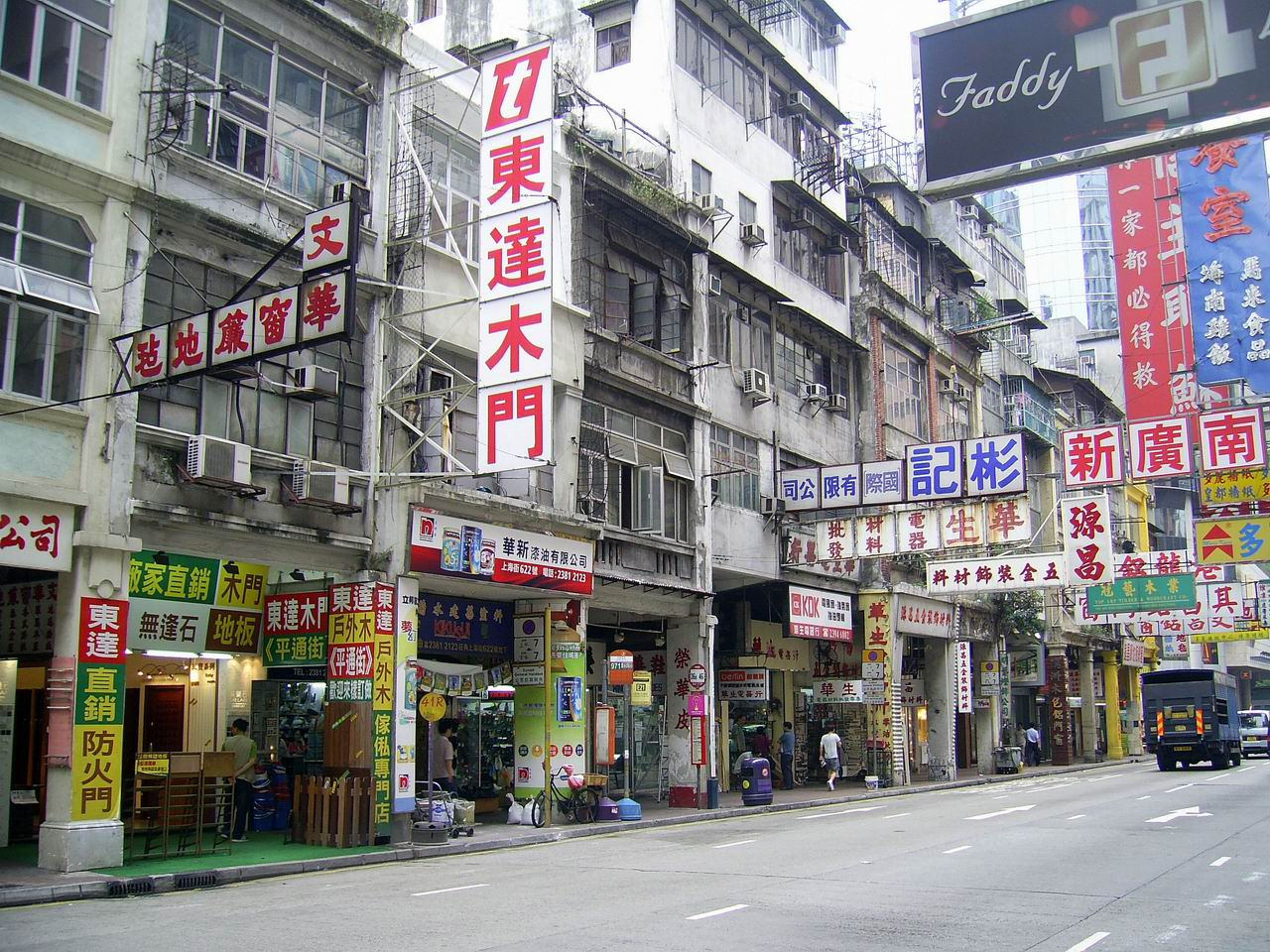
Nos. 600-626 Shanghai Street, in Mong Kok, Hong Kong

Tong lau or ke lau are tenement buildings built from the late 19th century to the 1960s in Hong Kong, Taiwan, Southern China, and Southeast Asia. Designed for both residential and commercial uses, they are similar in style and function to the shophouses with five-foot way (Min Nan Chinese: têng-á-kha) of Southeast Asia. Over the years, tong lau construction has seen influences of Edwardian-style architecture and later the Bauhaus movement.

== Etymology ==
Tong lau (Cantonese) or tang lou (Mandarin) means "Chinese building" – Tong or Tang (唐) refers to the Tang dynasty and is used as a term to mean Chinese, and lau (樓) is a building with more than one floor. It is a general term for a type of building found in Hong Kong that also developed in Macau and Canton (Guangzhou) from traditional Southern Chinese townhouses.

Ke lau or qilou (Chinese: 騎樓), meaning "riding building", is a form of tong lau with an arcade running alongside the road for pedestrian use.

== Architecture ==
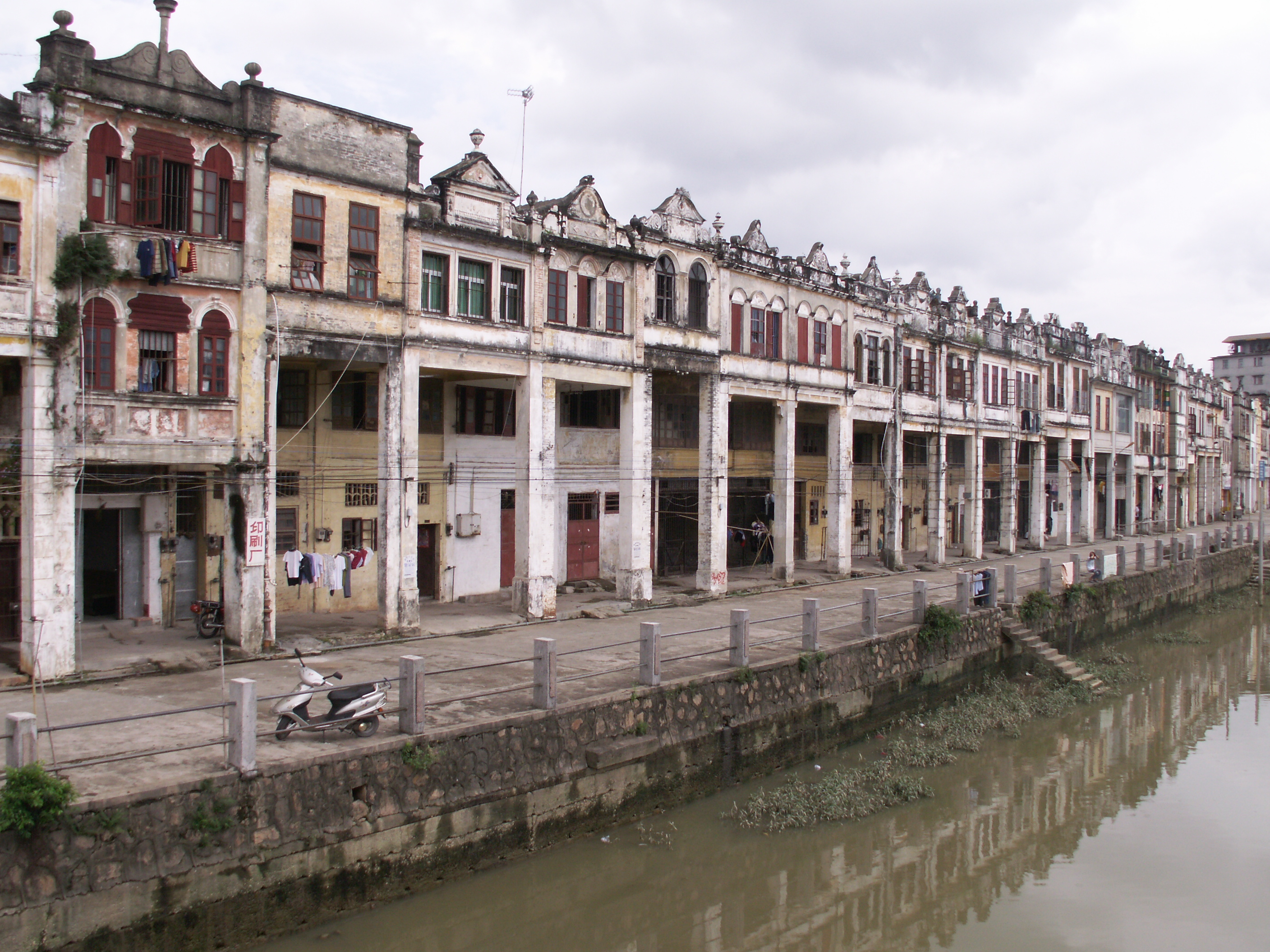
Early 20th century Tong Laus on Dixi Road in Chikan, Kaiping

Early tong lau buildings were generally long and narrow with a width of between 12 and 15 feet (3.7 and 4.6 m), determined by the length of the wooden beams. In Hong Kong's building regulations, tong lau refers to a building with any living space intended for more than one tenant. It is essentially a tenement building for residential and commercial use. The ground floor is reserved for commercial use, mostly by small businesses like retail shops and food vendors. The upper floors are for residential use, and cater to Chinese residents of Hong Kong.

Most early tong lau were two-to-four stories tall, due to building regulations that initially limited the height of building to 1.25 times the width of the street with a maximum height of 35 feet (11 m). However, due to the influx of migrants from mainland China to Hong Kong in the 1950s, height control of buildings was relaxed in 1955, and some tong lau that were built after that might have nine or more floors and be built without lifts. The heyday of tong lau ended in the 1960s when population pressure resulted in many tong lau being demolished to make way for high-rise buildings, along with changes in building ordinances in order to allow for such high-rise buildings.

The term ke lau was originally "kelau with feet" (Chinese: 有腳騎樓; pinyin: yǒu jiǎo qí lóu; Jyutping: Jau5goek3 Ke4lau2), which was first used in Canton's building regulations in 1912, and referred to the columns forming the colonnade that supported the projecting floors that "ride" above. The ke lau buildings developed in Guangzhou were influenced by local traditions and the shophouses with five-foot ways of Singapore, which were first built following the instructions of Stamford Raffles given in his town plan soon after the founding of the colony in the early 19th century. Ke lau were built in Southern China (Guangdong, Guangxi and Fujian) starting in the early 20th century. Most of the ke lau in Guangzhou were built in the 1930s until the outbreak of the Sino-Japanese war, and few were built after that period.

== History ==
=== Early tong lau ===
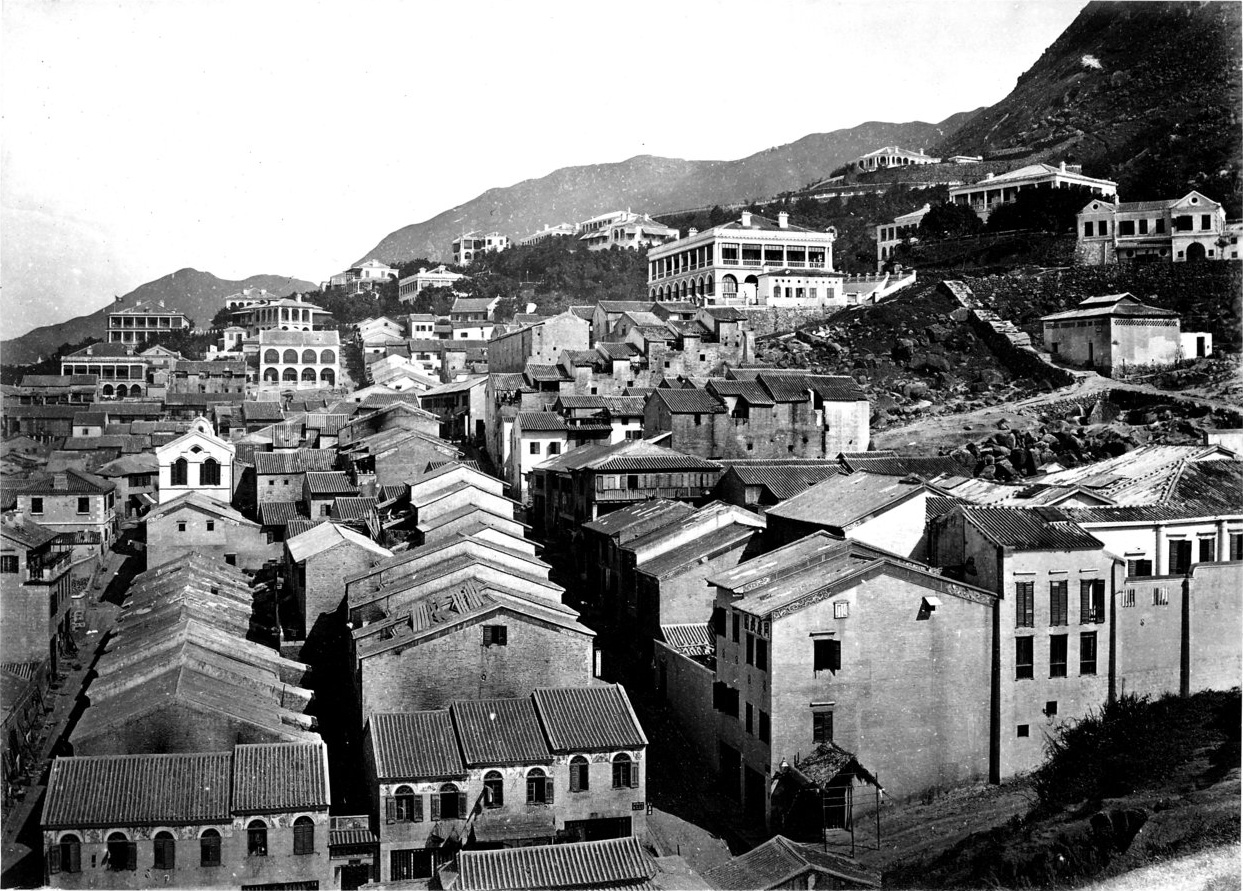
19th-century tong lau in Tai Ping Shan in Hong Kong. The terraced buildings used by the Chinese in the foreground are distinct from the larger buildings used by Europeans higher up in the background.

Early Hong Kongese tong lau mainly consisted of two- or three-story structures built back-to-back in areas such as Tai Ping Shan. 19th-century tong lau synthesized Chinese and European architectural features. While the Chinese component was based on building design from southern China, mainly that of Guangdong Province; European influences were usually Neoclassical. The tong lau roof used wood and/or Xieding tiles and iron was used for the balconies. The balcony's design was based on Cantonese styles. Windows used French styling and were made of wood and glass. The upper floors were supported by brick pillars and protruded out to the edge of the street.

Inside, the floors were connected by wooden stairs. Most floors ranged from 450 to 700 square feet with very high ceilings. Top floors were often living quarters for shopkeepers and their family.

Other architectural features of early tong lau are:

- granite capped balustrades
- decorative urns on the roof
- wooden floors and joists
- Canton floor tiles

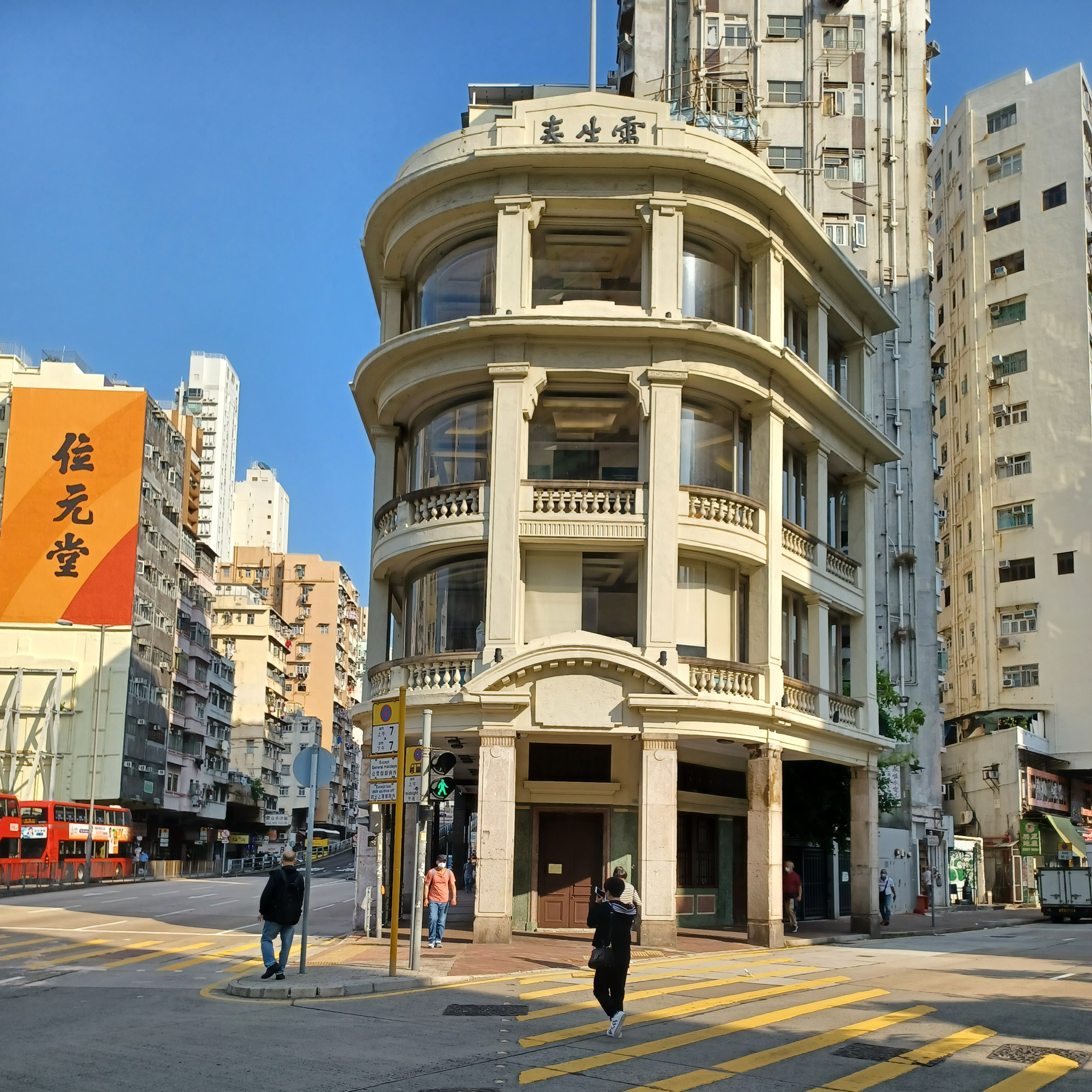
Lui Seng Chun in Mong Kok, Hong Kong, was built in 1931.

In 1903, in response to an outbreak of bubonic plague, the Hong Kong government issued a set of new regulations for tong lau so as to improve the living conditions for inhabitants in these buildings. New tong lau buildings needed to have a light well, have larger windows, and the buildings were limited to four floors so their residents can receive sufficient light. The frontage were set at 15 feet, and at the back there needed to be a six-foot lane, so as to remove back-to-back constructions. Roof tiles were also replaced by flat concrete roofs.

In the 1920s, reinforced concrete began to be introduced as the main structural element, which allowed for a veranda as well as cantilevered or recessed balconies to let in extra light. An example of tong lau or ke lau from this period is Lui Seng Chun, a building in reinforced concrete built in Hong Kong in 1931.

=== After World War II ===
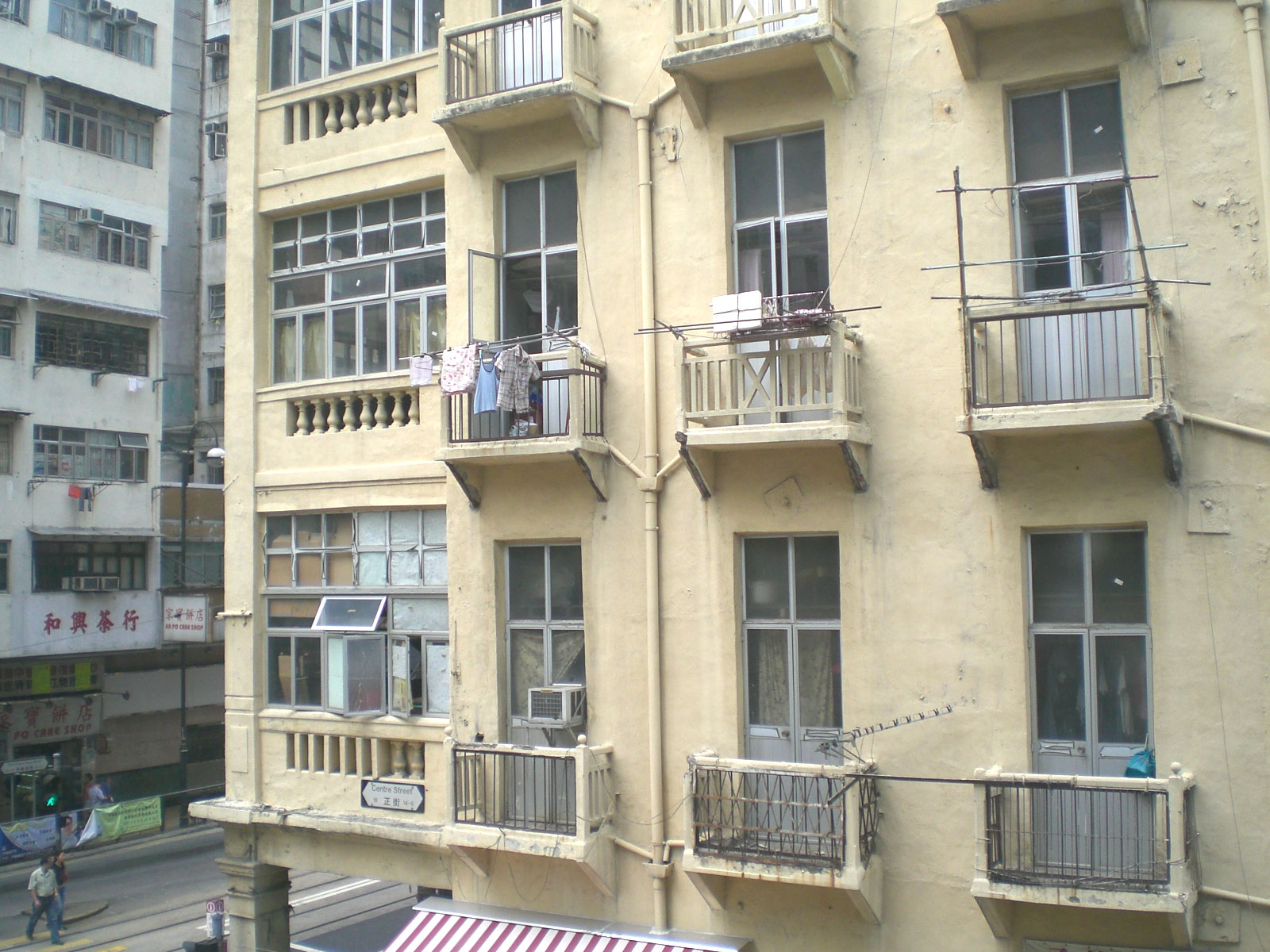
Example of tong lau in Sai Ying Pun, Hong Kong

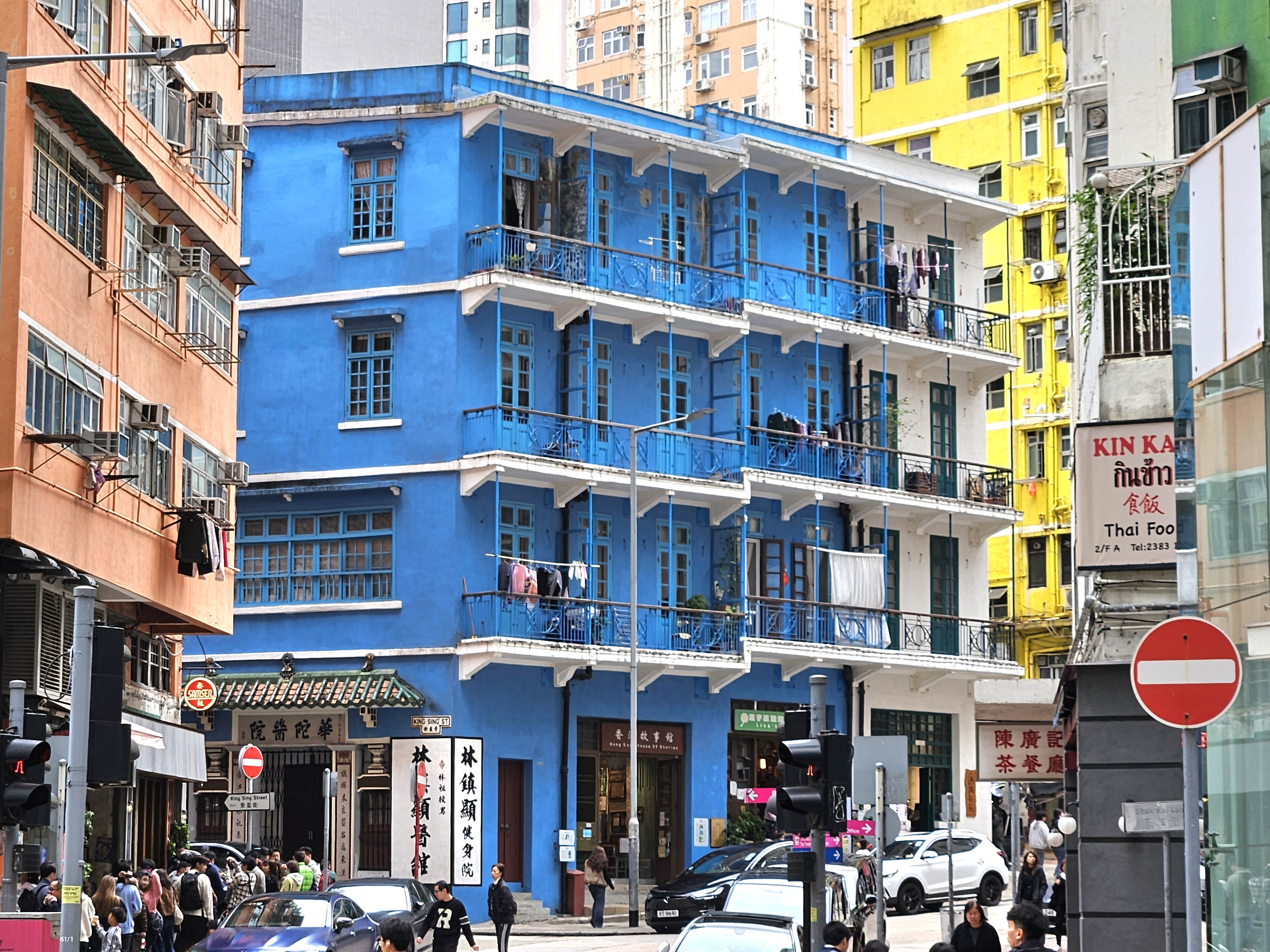
The osteopathy clinic in the Blue House, in Wan Chai, Hong Kong

Tong lau built after World War II were simpler in design:

Iron balconies were replaced with concrete ones and later sealed with windows. Roofs were often flat with an open terrace and later renovated to allow for additional residential space. Wooden windows gave way to stainless steel windows. Air conditioning units were added to the windows in the 1970s and 1980s. Often clothes racks were added below the windows and hung above the sidewalk or street below. Signs were hung on the exterior walls and protruded onto the streets below.

Other features of the new tong lau included:

- mosaic floor tiles
- terrazzo staircase

The postwar boom and influx of immigrants led to a shortage of housing in Hong Kong. Many tong lau were renovated to become rental units. In order to become spacious space, each unit was separated from adjacent units through brick party walls, is between 13 and 16 feet wide (about 4 to 5 m).

The ground floor of a tong lau was used as shop space, but a cockloft was often built on the upper space in front of the partition wall of the kitchen, or utilized as working area. Rooms on the upper floors were divided into smaller rooms and sublet as units by owners; said rooms were only big enough to accommodate bunk beds. The middle of the floor was a common space for tenants to eat and use. Bathrooms and kitchens were also shared among the tenants of each floor. Tenants paid for electricity and water on a monthly basis.

The subletting of floors in tong lau led to changes in housing regulations in Hong Kong.

After the 1960s, many tong lau were demolished to give way to taller apartment and commercial buildings, especially new town or private apartment. Fewer Tong Lau are relatively found in Hong Kong today.

On 29 January 2010, No. 45J Ma Tau Wai Road, Ma Tau Wai, a five-story-tall tong lau of more than 50 years history, suddenly collapsed at approximately 1:43 pm. Four people were killed. Such spontaneous, cascading and complete building collapse in Hong Kong has been quite rare since the Second World War and the incident raised concern of the HKSAR Government and the Hong Kong public towards the safety of the aging tong lau in Hong Kong, especially those built with similar specifications 50 or more years ago.

== Location ==
=== Mainland China ===
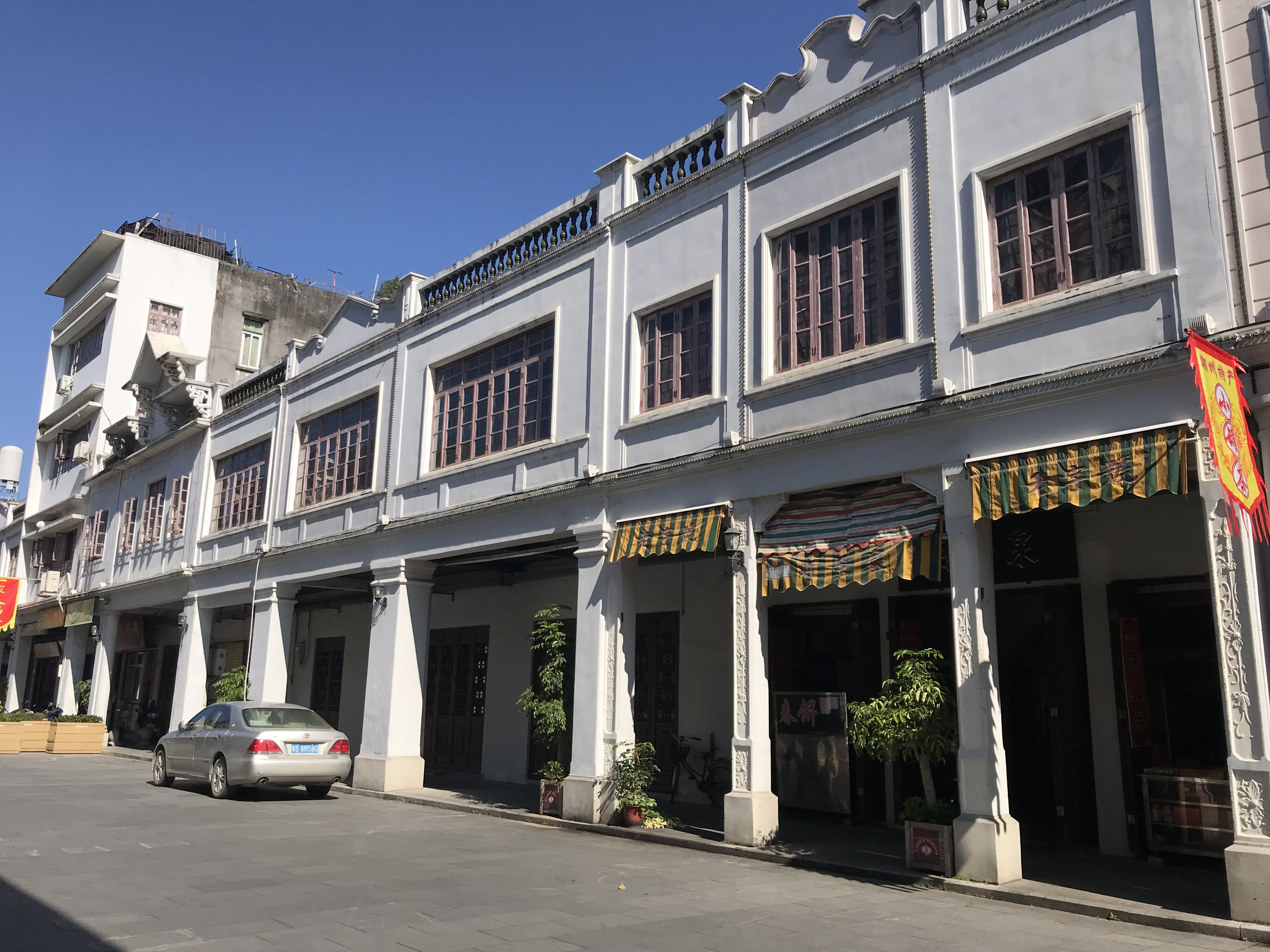
Shophouses on Paifang Street, Chaozhou

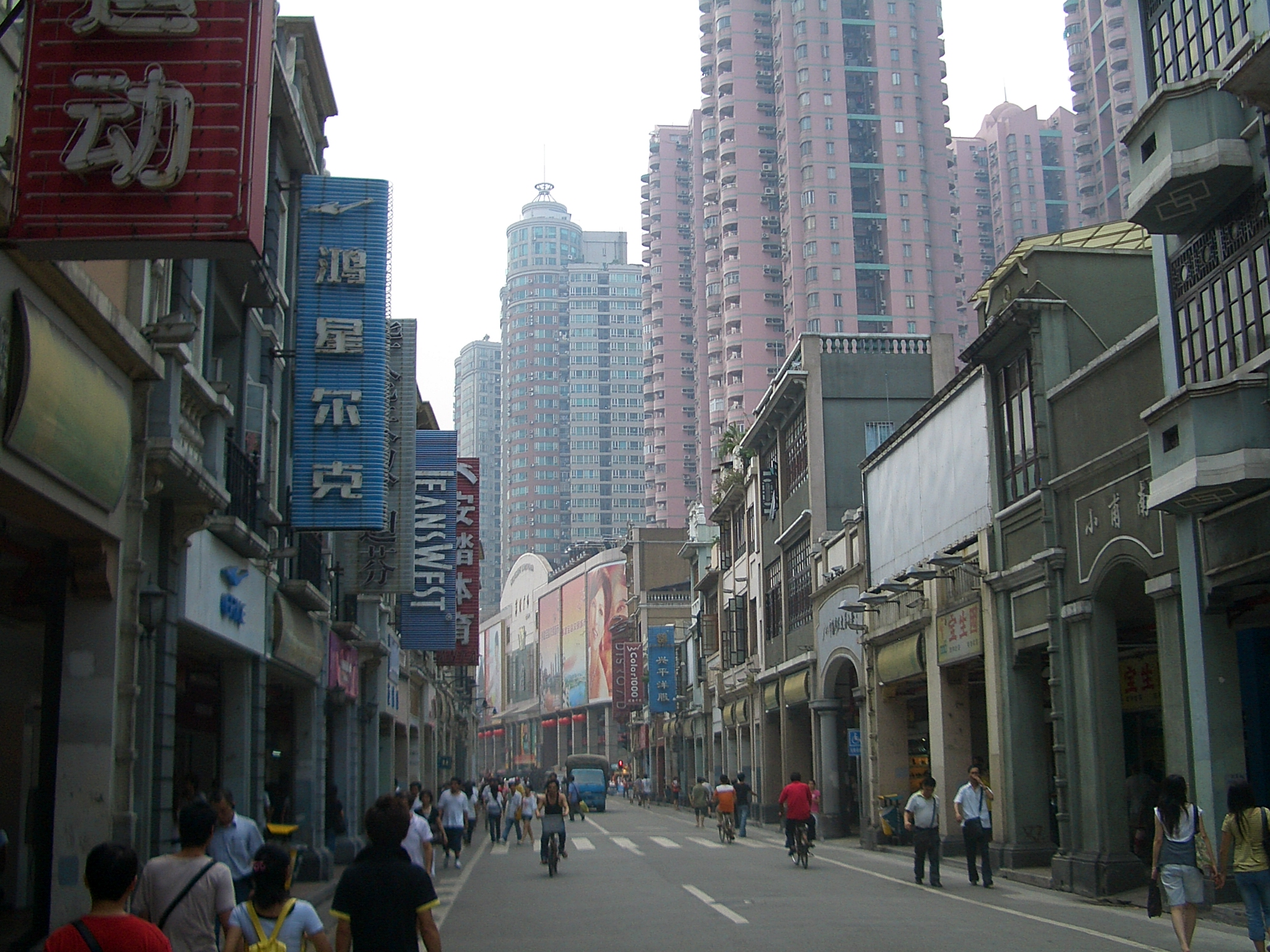
Shopping street in Guangzhou

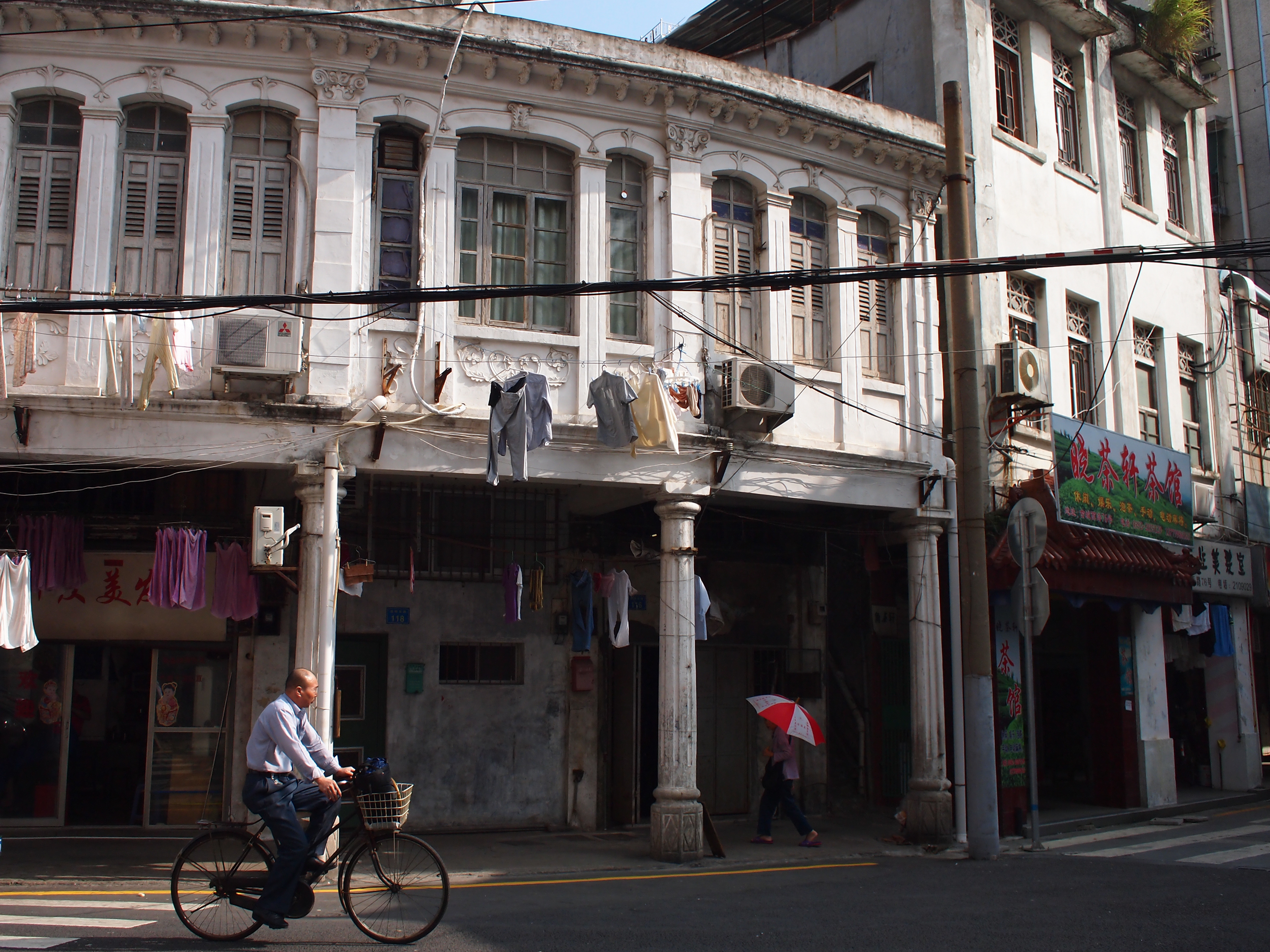
Ke lau in Xiamen

Ke lau styles varied from Chinese to European:

- Gothic Style
- Nanyang (Southeast Asia) Style
- Ancient Roman Gallery Style
- Imitation Baroque Style
- Modernisme
- Traditional Chinese Architectural Style

==== Guangdong ====
Southern China, namely cities in Guangdong Province, is the birthplace of tong lau and ke lau. They were built by wealthy Chinese merchants in the cities like Guangzhou and, with the aid of overseas Chinese, in emigrant market towns like Chikan, Kaiping.

Locations in Guangzhou with Ke lau:

- Renmin Zhong Road (人民中路)
- Renmin Nan Road (人民南路)
- Shangxiajiu Pedestrian Street, including Dishifu Road (上下九步行街)
- Yide Road especially area around the Sacred Heart Stone House Cathedral (一德路)
- Wanfu Road (萬福路)
- Taikang Road (泰康路)
- Xinhua Bookstore of Science and Technology on Beijing Road (北京路)
- Oi Kwan Hotel on Yanjiangxi Road (沿江西路)
- 186 Wenming Road (文明路)
- 139 Dezheng Nan Road (德政南路)

==== Hainan and Guangxi ====
As both Hainan Island and the eastern part of the Guangxi Province lie in the broader Cantonese sphere of linguistical and cultural influence and historically were part of Guangdong, several cities and towns also have this kind of architecture.

===== Beihai =====
The city of Beihai lies on the coast in Guangxi. The Old Sheng Ping Street (升平街舊址) is lined with 'ke lau architecture. Life and trade thrived here in the 19th century. Today it is full of restaurants, souvenir shops and adorned with sculptures and boards with information about local culture.

===== Haikou =====
The historical Bo'ai Road area is located in the heart of the Hainan capital city of Haikou. Nearly all the buildings here are of tong lau style. Beginning in 2012, the entire area has been undergoing restoration. It started with Zhongshan Road, now completed and converted into a pedestrian zone. The restoration is currently expanding outward with the facades being replastered and painted. Lights facing toward the facades to illuminate them at night are now installed on many of the buildings. With road repair ongoing, and new, tourist-related businesses replacing the old shops, the entire area is being developed as a visitor attraction.

===== Chengmai =====
The southern part of the town of Chengmai, located in Chengmai County, Hainan, has an area adjacent to the Nandu River that consists of numerous, dilapidated tong lau buildings.

===== Wenchang =====
The tong lau buildings in the city of Wenchang's "Wennan Old Street" have been completely restored. Unlike Haikou's Bo'ai Road area, the facades are unpainted and are gray in appearance. The area is located downtown and is a visitor attraction.

====== Puqian ======
An area within the town of Puqian, mostly consisting of a single street, is lined with tong lau buildings. This street is the main route from the port to the city center. However, the tong lau buildings here are in serious disrepair. In fact, many of them are structurally unsafe.

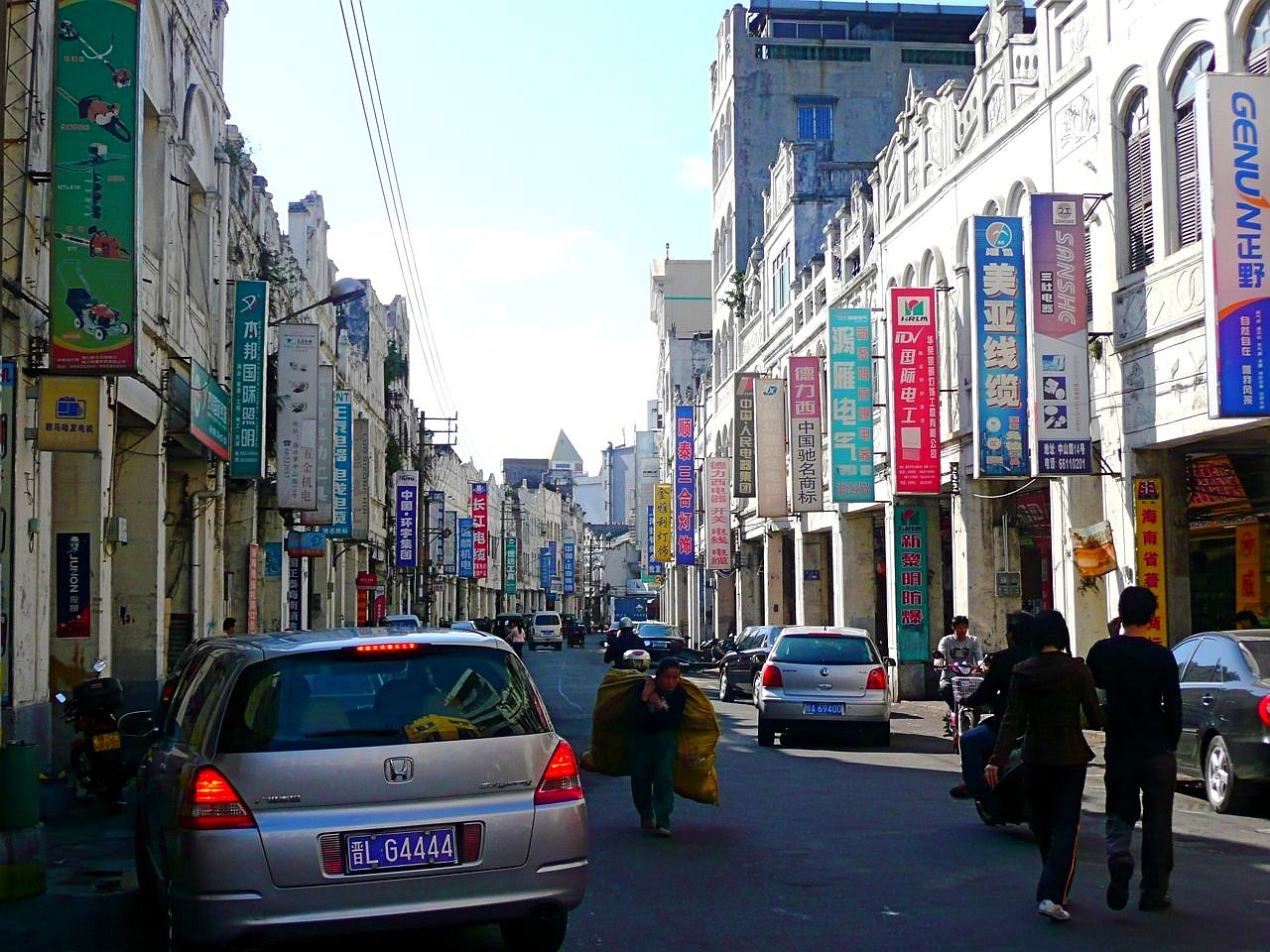
Bo'ai Road area in Haikou

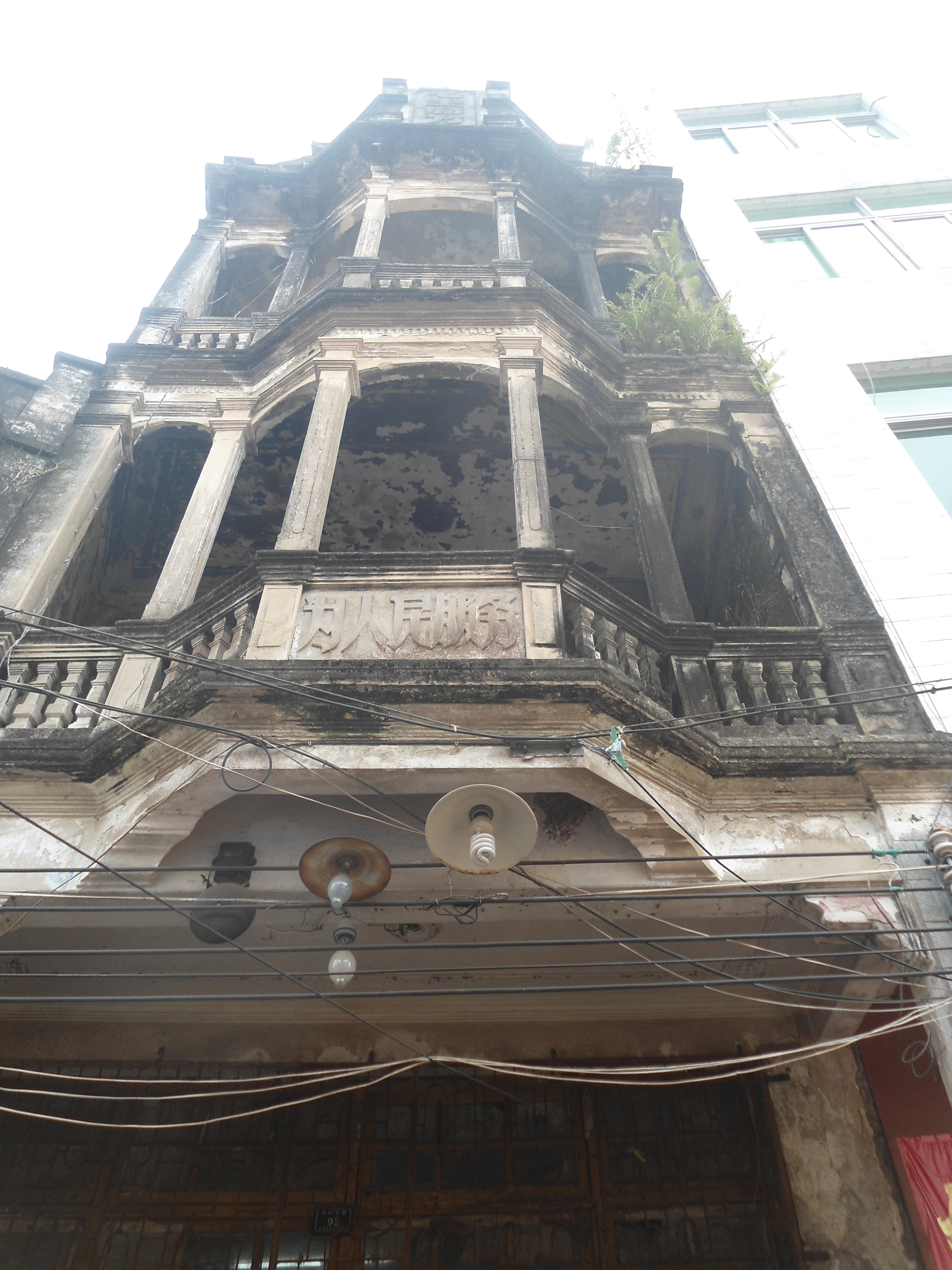
Tong lau building in Chengmai town

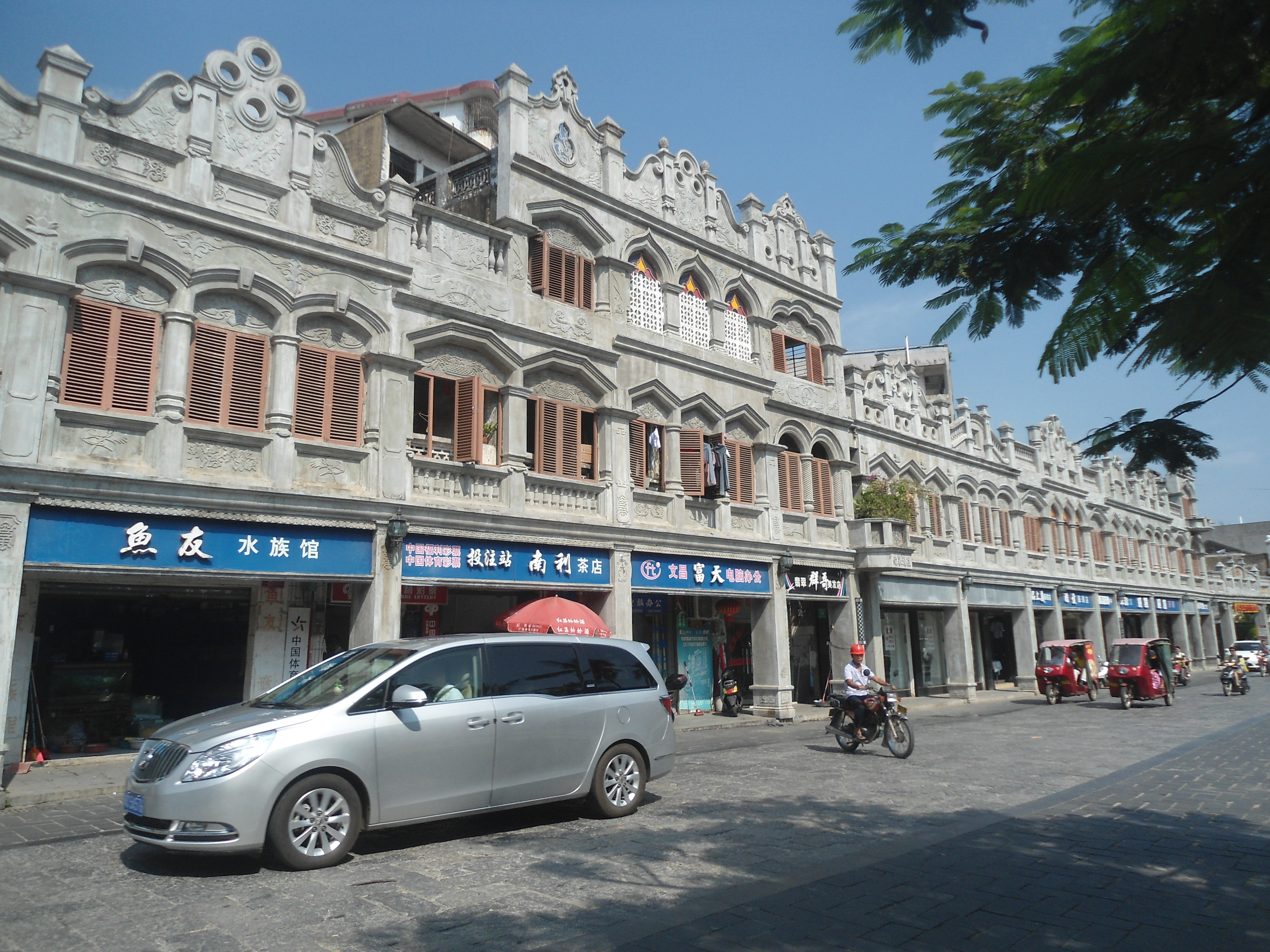
Wenchang City's "Wennan Old Street"

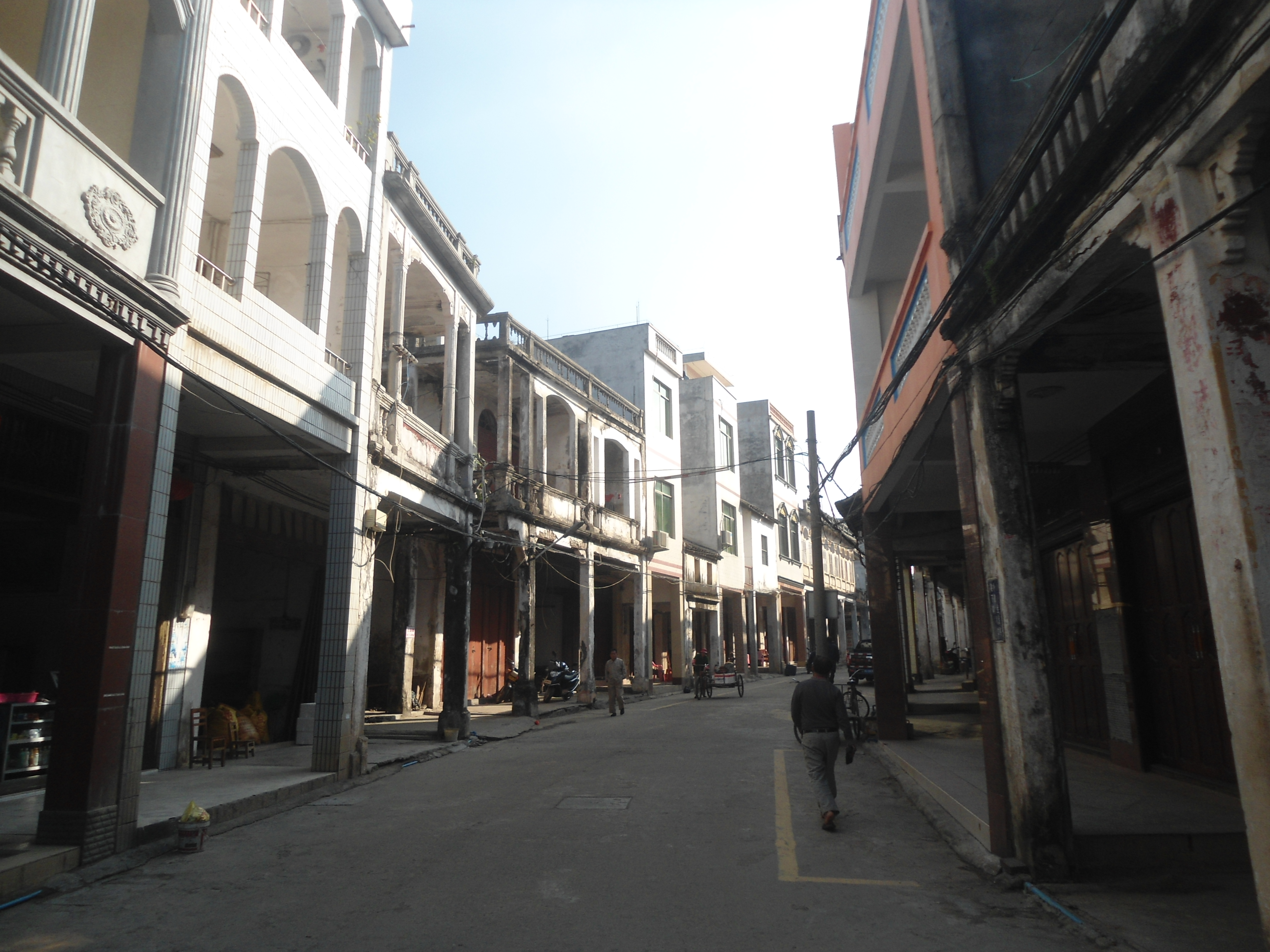
Tong lau buildings in Puqian

=== Macau ===
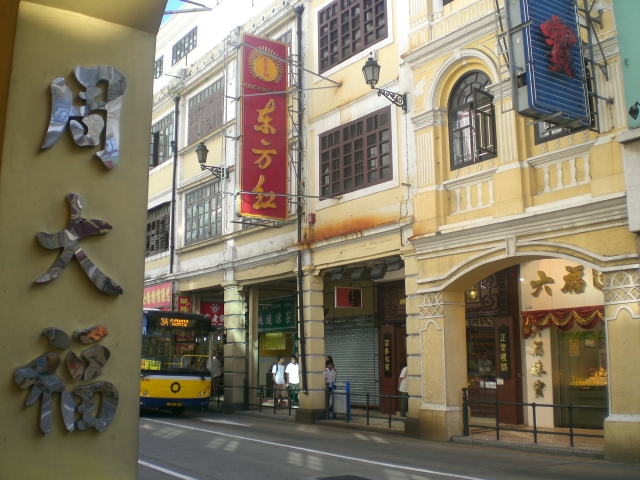
Avenida de Almeida Ribeiro in Macau

Tong lau are also found in Macau on Avenida de Almeida Ribeiro near the Largo do Senado. They are better preserved in Macau, where they did not give way to newer buildings. Upper floors no longer house people and often are assigned for commercial use. Tong lau here often feature Portuguese colonial architectural influences.

=== Hong Kong ===
The existence of tong lau was a culmination of a series of historic forces including the economic development of Hong Kong, the Second World War, and the influx of Chinese migrants to Hong Kong.

In 1898, the government introduced a building and public health ordinance which defined all the buildings including tong lau. In 1903, the government introduced a four-story limit as well as a maximum height per story of 9 feet (2.7 m). This explains the general appearance of tong lau. The ordinance changed in 1962; this became fully operative in 1966, and no tong lau was built later.

Tong laus are mainly distributed in the following areas in Hong Kong: Cheung Chau, Kennedy Town, Shek Tong Tsui, Sai Ying Pun, Sheung Wan, Central, Wan Chai, Causeway Bay, Happy Valley, Tai Hang, North Point, Quarry Bay, Sai Wan Ho, Shau Kei Wan, Chai Wan, Aberdeen, Tin Wan, Ap Lei Chau, Stanley, Tsim Sha Tsui, Yau Ma Tei, Mong Kok, Tai Kok Tsui, Sham Shui Po, Cheung Sha Wan, Shek Kip Mei, Hung Hom, To Kwa Wan, Ma Tau Wai, Ho Man Tin, Kowloon City, Wong Tai Sin, San Po Kong, Lok Fu, Tsz Wan Shan, Ngau Chi Wan, Kwun Tong, Ngau Tau Kok, Cha Kwo Ling, Kwai Chung, Tsuen Wan, Tuen Mun, Yuen Long, Tai Wai, Tai Po, Luen Wo Hui, Sheung Shui, Sha Tau Kok, Sai Kung Town, and Tai O.

There are a number of extant tong lau in Hong Kong:

==== Hong Kong Island ====
Image	Address	Area	Grade	Notes	References
	Nos. 145, 147, 149, 151, 153 Third Street 22.28588°N 114.139358°E	Shek Tong Tsui	Nil		
	207 Des Voeux Road West (zh) 22.288056°N 114.142222°E	Sai Ying Pun	Grade II		
	Nos. 67 & 69 Des Voeux Road West 22.287908°N 114.14601°E	Sai Ying Pun	Proposed; Grade III	Demolished	
	No. 1 Queen's Road West 22.28633°N 114.14876°E	Sheung Wan	Grade III		
	Nos. 172, 174, 176 Queen's Road Central / Nos. 123, 125, 127 Wellington Street 22.284684°N 114.15338°E	Central	Grade I		
	306 Queen's Road Central	Central	Not listed		
	Tak Wing Pawn Shop; Nos. 72 Des Voeux Road Central 22.283899°N 114.156146°E	Central	Pending		
	Nos. 17, 19 Shing Wong Street	Central	Not listed		
	Nos. 1–12 Wing Lee Street	Central	Not listed		
	23-33 Haven Street	Causeway Bay	Not listed		
	Yellow House; Nos. 2, 4, 6, 8 Hing Wan Street	Wan Chai	Grade III		
	Woo Cheong Pawn Shop; Nos. 60–66 Johnston Road 22.276315°N 114.171431°E	Wan Chai	Grade II		
	No. 8 King Sing Street	Wan Chai	Nil		
	Green House; Nos. 1–11 Mallory Street and 6–12 Burrows Street	Wan Chai	Grade II		
	Nos. 186–190 Queen's Road East	Wan Chai	Grade III		
	No. 6 Stewart Road (zh)	Wan Chai	Grade III		
	Blue House; Nos. 72-74A Stone Nullah Lane	Wan Chai	Grade I		
	No. 18 Ship Street 22.275967°N 114.170882°E	Wan Chai	Grade II		
	Nos. 109 and 111 Lockhart Road 22.278253°N 114.172375°E	Wan Chai	Grade III		
	Nos. 284 & 286 Lockhart Road 22.278537°N 114.177196°E	Wan Chai	Not listed		
	Tung Tak Pawn Shop 22.27895°N 114.17962°E	Wan Chai	Grade III	Demolished	
	Nos. 89, 91 Electric Road 22.284913°N 114.191541°E; 22.284965°N 114.191536°E	North Point	Nil		

==== Kowloon ====
Image	Address	Area	Grade	Notes	References
	No. 119 Lai Chi Kok Road (Lui Seng Chun)	Mong Kok	Declared		
	No. 729 Nathan Road	Mong Kok	Grade III		
	Nos. 1, 3 Playing Field Road	Mong Kok	Grade III		
	Nos. 177–179, 190–204, 210–212 Prince Edward Road West	Mong Kok	Grade II		
	Nos. 600–606, 612, 614, 620–626 Shanghai Street	Mong Kok	Grade I		
	Nos. 1166 and 1168 Canton Road 22.322829°N 114.166507°E	Mong Kok	Grade III		
	No. 23 Argyle Street 22.319156°N 114.167439°E	Mong Kok	Nil		
	45 Ma Tau Wai Road	Hok Yuen	Not listed		
	Nos. 1 & 3 Hau Wong Road	Kowloon City	Grade III		
	Nos. 187, 189 Apliu Street	Sham Shui Po	Grade II (No. 189)		
	No. 1235 Canton Road	Sham Shui Po	Grade III		
	Nos. 130, 132 Ki Lung Street	Sham Shui Po	Grade III		
	Nos. 117, 119, 121, 123, 125 Nam Cheong Street	Sham Shui Po	Grade III		
	No. 58 Pei Ho Street	Sham Shui Po	Grade II		
	No. 75 Un Chau Street 22.332549°N 114.162749°E	Sham Shui Po	Grade III		
	No. 142 Un Chau Street	Sham Shui Po	Not listed		
	No. 170 Yee Kuk Street	Sham Shui Po	Grade II		
	Nos. 51, 53 Yen Chow Street 22.332549°N 114.161465°E	Sham Shui Po	Grade I	Built in 1932.	
	Nos. 269, 271 Yu Chau Street (zh)	Sham Shui Po	Grade III		
	No. 96 Apliu Street	Sham Shui Po	Grade II	Demolished in 2022	
	No. 62 Fuk Wing Street	Sham Shui Po	Grade III		
	301 & 303 Castle Peak Road (zh)	Cheung Sha Wan	Grade II		
	No. 14 Nam Cheong Street	Sham Shui Po	Not listed	Built in 1964.	

==== New Territories ====
Image	Address	Area	Grade	Notes	References
	Nos. 46, 48 Kat Hing Street, Tai O	Tai O	Grade III		
	No. 31 Lee Yick Street, Yuen Long Kau Hui	Yuen Long	Grade II	Demolished	
	Nos. 33–35 Nam Mun Hau, Yuen Long Kau Hui	Yuen Long	Grade III		
	Nos. 1–22 San Lau Street	Sha Tau Kok	Grade II		
	Nos. 233, 234, 242 Tai San Back Street	Cheung Chau	Grade III		

== See also ==
- Arcade
- Five-foot way
- Architecture of Hong Kong
- Lingnan architecture
- Housing in Hong Kong
- Terraced house
- zh:騎樓
