= Pawnbrokers in Hong Kong =

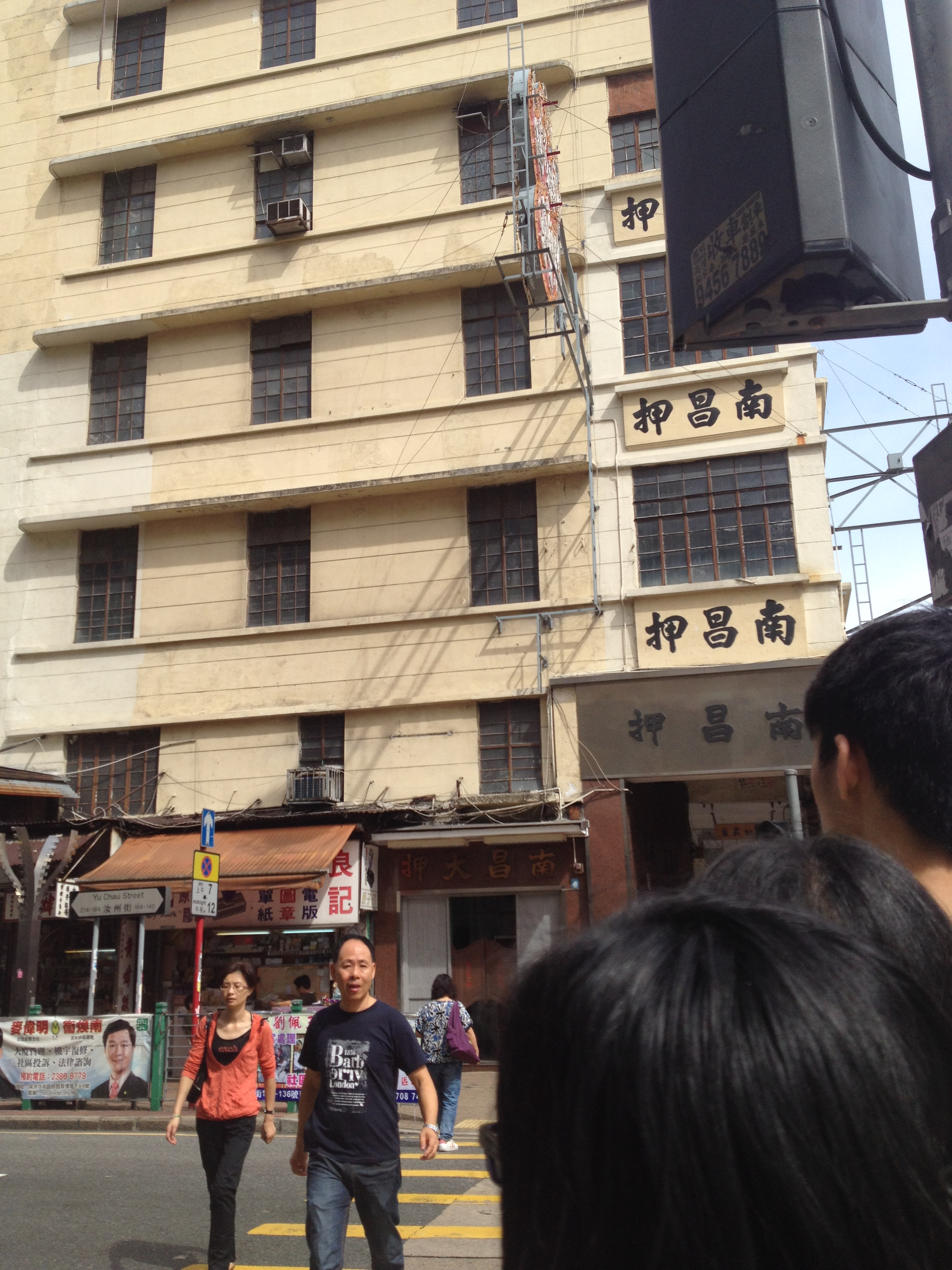
Nam Cheong Pawnshop in Sham Shui Po.

In 2014, there were 200 pawnbrokers in Hong Kong, with the number increasing over the next several years. Pawn shops are some of the oldest businesses in Hong Kong. The pawn shops themselves have several prominent features, including a screen to block the view of passersby, as well as a high counter. Additionally, these shops are governed by strict regulations, such as having to keep records of all transactions and being obliged to report any suspicious items to the authorities.

== History ==
There have been pawnbrokers in Hong Kong for over 200 years. According to the Guangdong Annals, there were 16 pawnbrokers in 1821 - the oldest of them was Jeun Yun Aat (Chinese: 晉源押). In 1837, the Yuen Long bazaar had its market days on the third, sixth, and ninth days of each month of the lunar calendar - discounts on those days were common. In 1926, the Hong Kong government strengthened its regulations on pawnshops and drafted pawn legislation. Since then, pawnbrokers are required to operate as licensed establishments. As a result, the industry's appeal was widened.

The activities of the pawnbrokers were limited by the Japanese during the Japanese occupation of Hong Kong in the Second World War. In 1943, Japan required Hong Kong to use Japanese military currency as a medium of exchange. When the Japanese surrendered in 1945, their currency was considered to be useless, and many people went to a pawnbroker to obtain some native currency for use in their daily transactions. To ensure that money was circulated, the Hong Kong Government urged the pawnbroking industry to revive itself; with government support, the Hong Kong & Kowloon Pawnbrokers' Association Limited was established in 1947 - at the time, there were only 11 members. Between 1950 and 1960, the number of members increased to more than 90, reaching 138 in 1994. As of 2013, the Association has more than 161 members; combined with non-member pawnshops, there are approximately 250 pawn shops in Hong Kong. Pawnshops are mainly located on Hong Kong Island, particularly Central and Kowloon. Because of this, and because many jewelry and goldsmith shops are located in Central, mortgage and loan facilities are more commonly found there than anywhere else in Hong Kong.

== Features of Hong Kong pawnshops ==
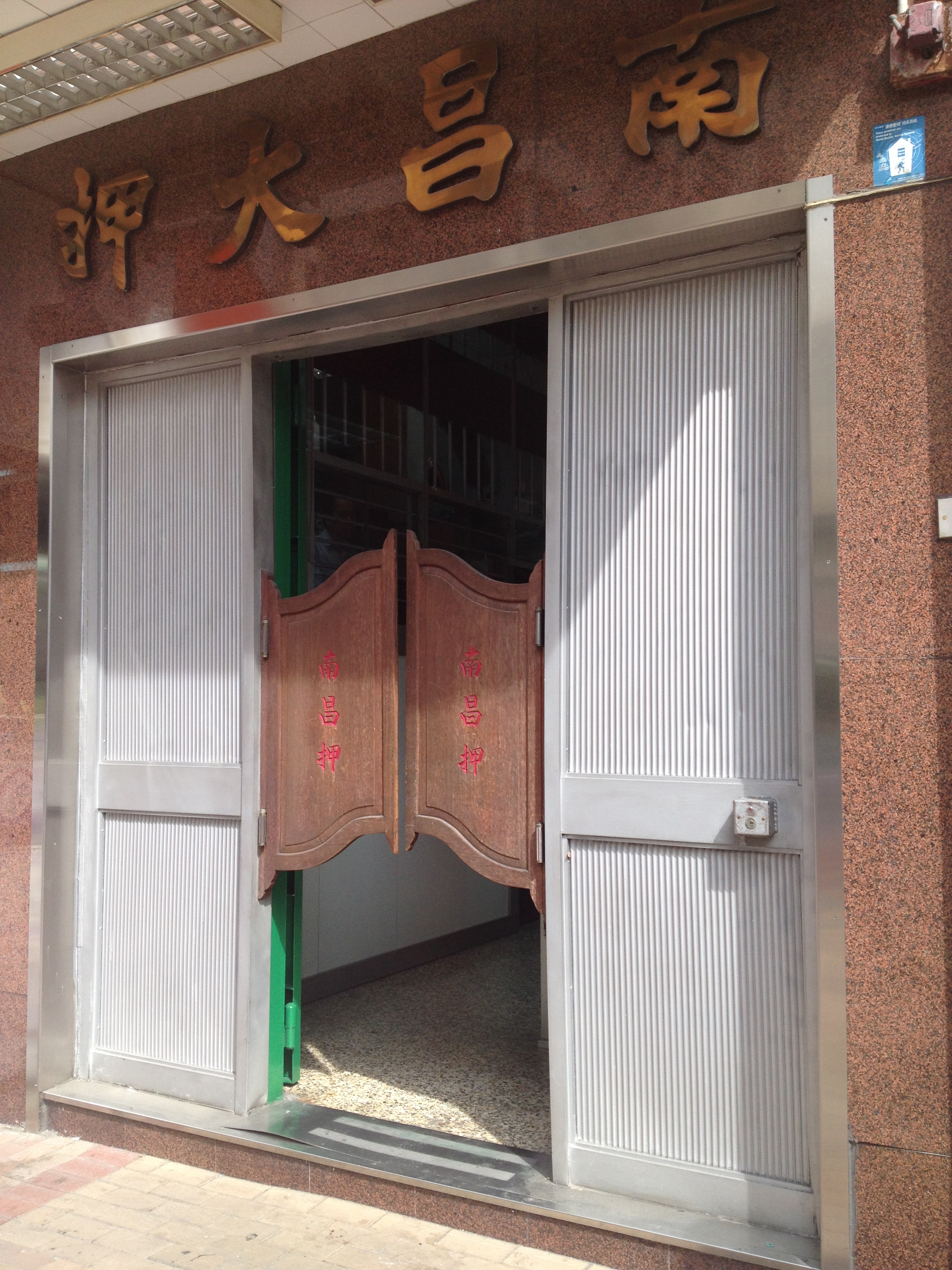
Dong Zung

=== Dong zung ===
A dong zung (Chinese: 擋中) is a large rectangular wooden screen, similar to a pair of doors, located right behind the entrance of the pawn shop. The screen is tall enough to block passers-by from seeing inside. Clients can be concealed by the board to avoid recognition.

=== Pawning counter ===
The counter of the pawnshop, which is behind the tall board, is typically taller than the average person. There are window frames in the counter. Clients need to hand over their mortgaged properties at the pawning counter. This design is meant to emphasize the superior status of the pawnbroker in the transaction. Another reason for setting a high counter is for security, as it is hard for passers-by and clients to see the environment and workers inside the pawnshop.

=== Names of pawnshops ===
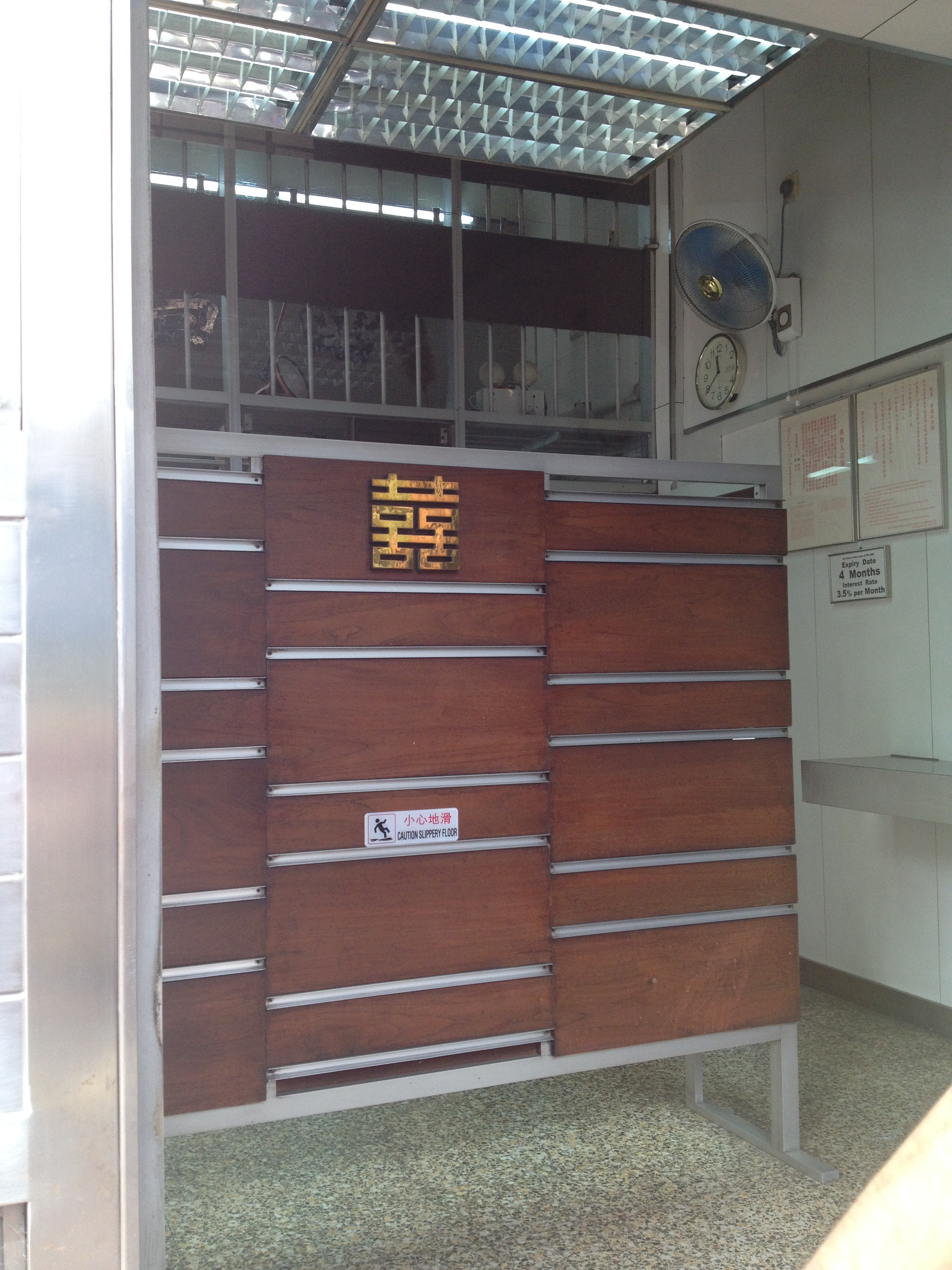
Ze Cau Baan

Pawnshops are considered to be a traditional industry in China. The majority of the shops use names including words meaning harmonious (for example 'tung' (同), 'wo' (和)) and/or prosperous (for example 'chang' (昌), 'fat' (發), 'fung' (豐)). The idea behind such a name is to encourage a flourishing business.

=== Regulations ===
In order to prevent the sale of stolen property in pawnshops, Hong Kong law stipulates that pawnshops must undergo strict verification and registration of prospective clients' Hong Kong identity card looking to pawn items. Pawnshops must keep digital records of all exchanges, and if any suspicious items are found in the pawnshop, the shop must immediately notify the local authorities.

== Terms used ==
- Ceot Zat (Chinese: 出質): Clients offering up items to be pawned.
- Ji Suk Gung/Ciu Fung (Chinese: 二叔公/朝奉): A worker who identifies and appraises the pawned goods.
- Maa Zi (Chinese: 碼子): The number sheet used to track exchanges.
- Zaap Gaa (Chinese: 雜架): Clocks, antiques, etc.
- Jyut Lik (Chinese: 月曆): The lunar calendar - since months for the lunar calendar are one to two days shorter than the solar calendar, if a pawnee repays the loan one day later than the deadline, they need to pay the next month's interest.
- Lau Dong Ban (Chinese: 流當品): The deadline for repaying loans and getting back the pawned item(s) ends.
- Leoi Gung Gwang (Chinese: 雷公轟): The mortgage interest.
- Ze Cau Baan (Chinese: 遮羞板): A big shield standing in front of the main gate, used to hide the inside of the store.
- Gau Ceot Sap Saam Gwai (Chinese: 九出十三歸): The method pawn shops use to calculate interest; for example, when the pawn is worth about 10 dollars, only nine dollars will be lent and in the end, thirteen dollars will be needed to repay the loan.

== See also ==
- Tung Tak Pawn Shop
