= Lui Seng Chun =

- 雷生春
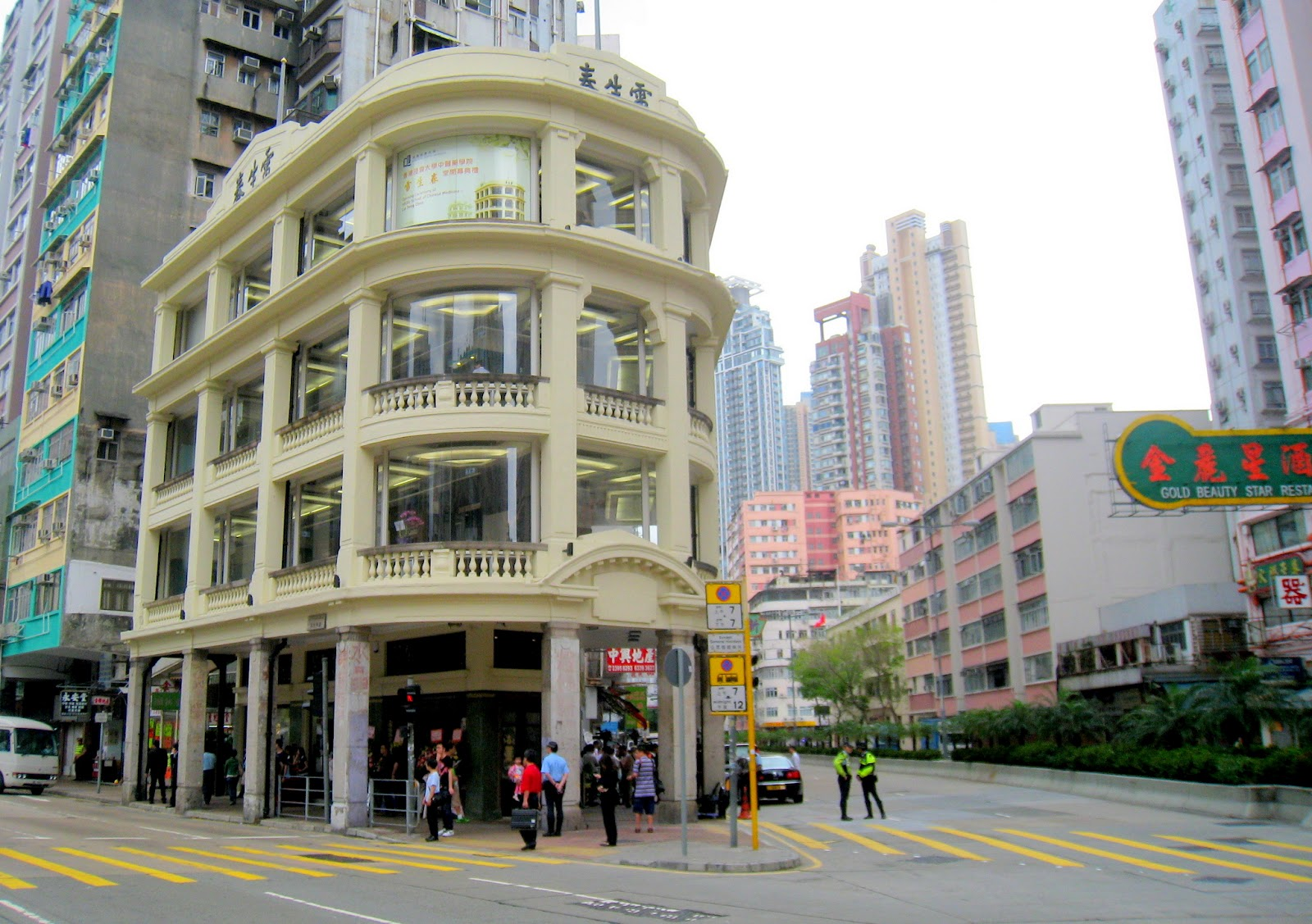
- Lui Seng Chun in 2012

- Location within Hong Kong

General information
- Location: 119 Lai Chi Kok Road
- Coordinates: 22°19′29.77″N 114°9′54.2″E
- Construction started: 1929
- Opened: 2012

Website
- scm.hkbu.edu.hk/lsc/en/index.html/

Lui Seng Chun
- Traditional Chinese: 雷生春
Transcriptions
Yue: Cantonese
- Yale Romanization: Lèuih sāang chēun
- Jyutping: Leoi4 saang1 coen1

Lui Seng Chun is a Grade I Historic Building located at 119 Lai Chi Kok Road, in Mong Kok, Hong Kong, at the junction with Tong Mi Road. It is a four-storey tong lau (the local term for Hong Kong shophouse typology) that was built in 1931 by Mr. Lui Leung. The architect was Mr. W. H. Bourne.

A replica of the building was featured in the 2016 movie Doctor Strange.

== Historical background ==
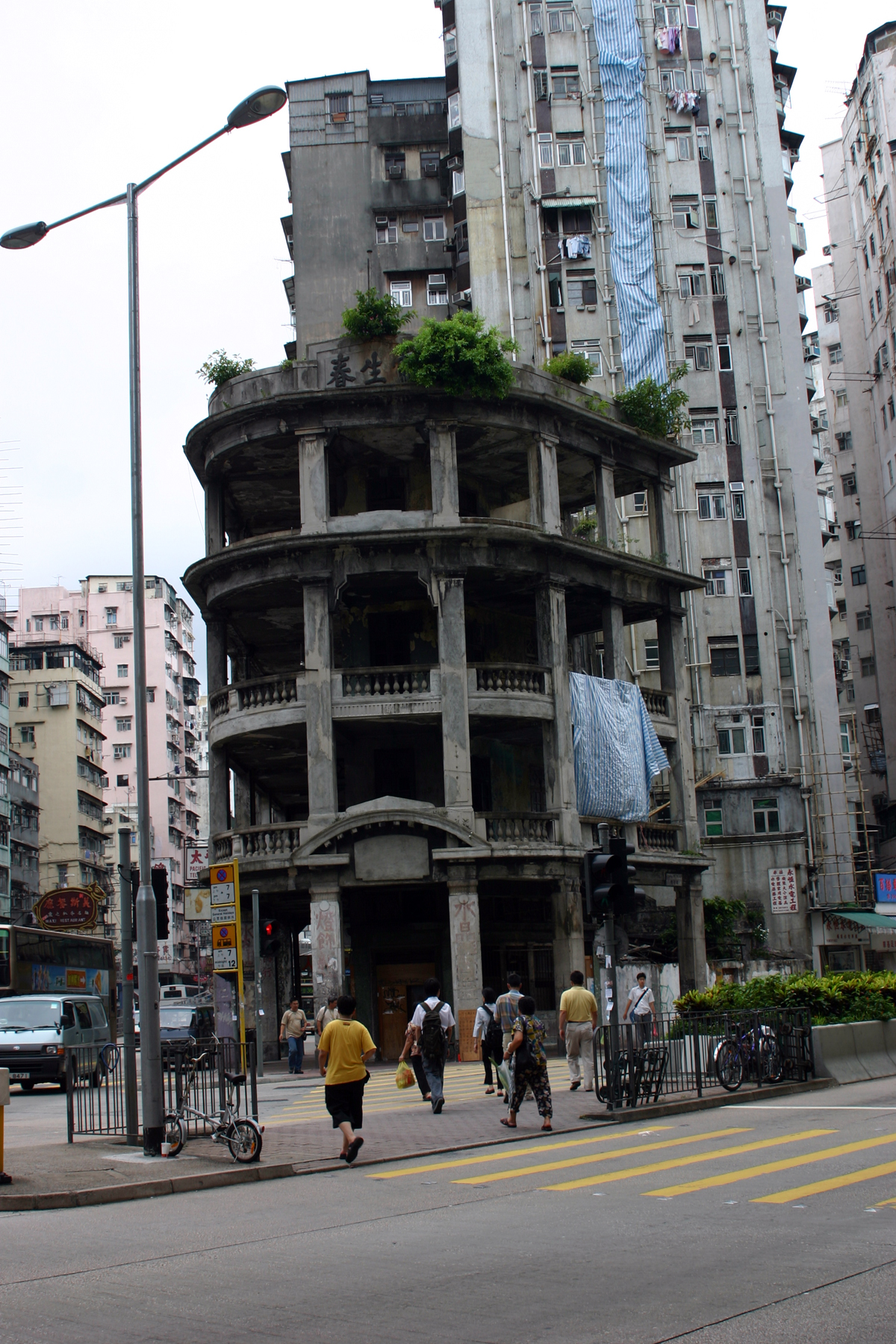
Lui Seng Chun in 2004, before restoration

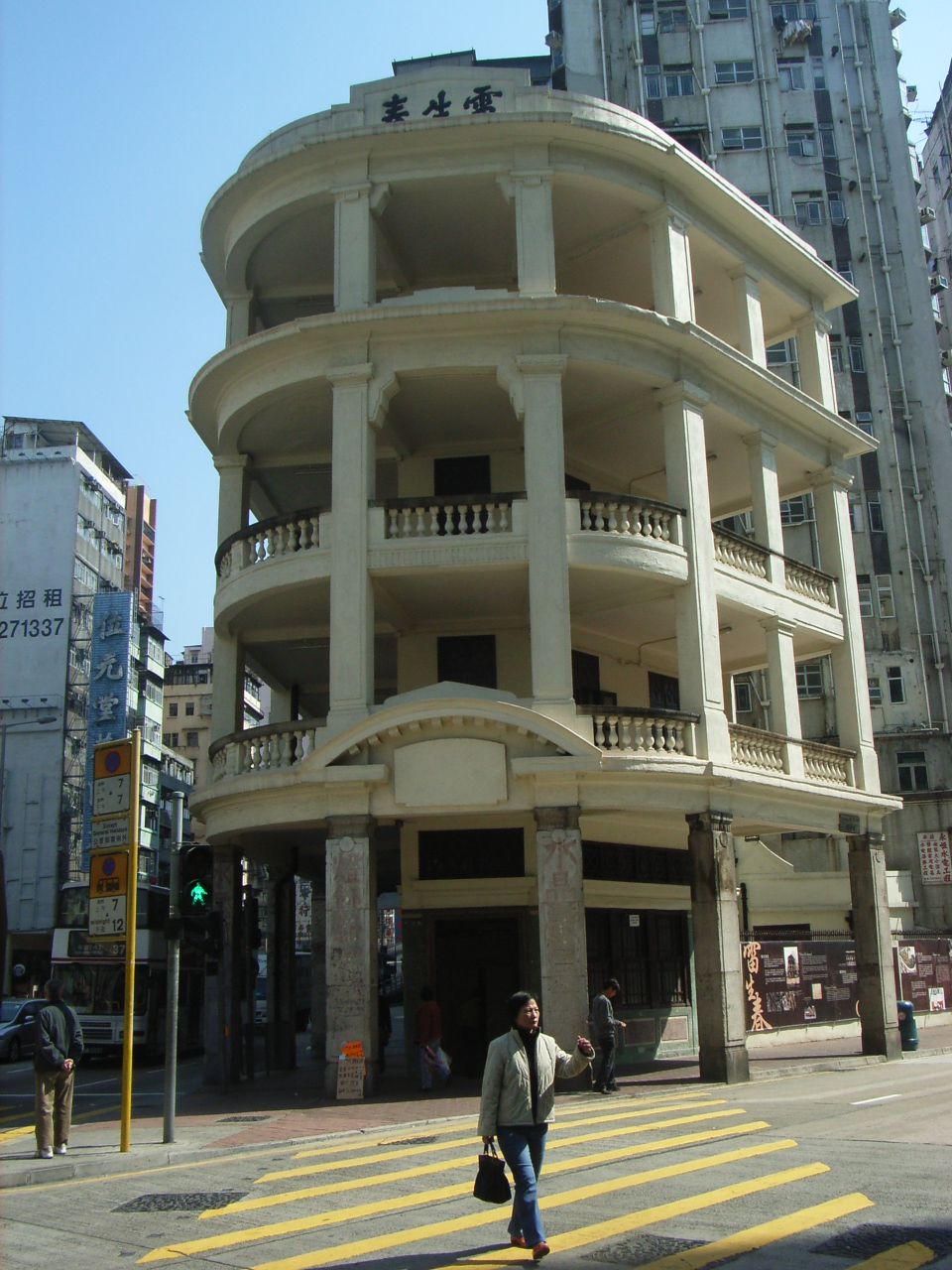
Lui Seng Chun in 2007.

Mr. Lui Leung (雷亮) (alias Lui Hung Wai 雷鴻維), the owner of Lui Seng Chun, was born in Taishan County of Guangdong Province. Upon his arrival in Hong Kong, he became actively engaged in transport and trading businesses. He was one of the founders of the Kowloon Motor Bus Company (1933) Limited.

In 1929, Mr. Lui purchased a piece of land at 119 Lai Chi Kok Road from the Government of Hong Kong and appointed W. H. Bourne, a local architect who specialised in designing shophouses to construct Lui Seng Chun. The construction work was completed in around 1931. The total area was about 600 square meters, a total of four floors. Each floor contained a wide balcony that could be used to block the sunlight and the rain.

Mr. Lui married three wives and had many children. In order to balance between his family's accommodation and his income, he decided to use shophouse as "Lui Seng Chun" building type. The upper floors became living quarters for the members of Lui's family, while the ground floor of the building was occupied by a Chinese bone-setting medicine wine shop named "Lui Seng Chun". The name "Lui Seng Chun" was derived from a pair of rhymed couplets, implying Lui's medicine could bring a patient back to life. The medicine enjoyed a good reputation locally and overseas.

Mr. Lui Leung died in 1944 and the shop was closed down a few years later. The building was subsequently used as accommodation and let out as tailor shops. As Lui's family members increased, they decided to move out from the building. Since 1980s, no one had lived in the building. It was out of maintenance and deserted. In 2000, the Lui's family proposed to the Antiquities and Monuments Office to donate the building to the Government of Hong Kong. The reason why they wanted to donate the government was because they had many memories of the building. They didn't want it to be sold or disassembled. As a result, they hoped the government could transfer it into an attraction and spread the name "Lui Seng Chun" in the society. The building was designated as a Grade I historic building in 2000. The transfer of the building was accomplished in October 2003.

The building was constructed right before the enactment of the Public Health and Building Ordinance of 1935, which stipulated a set of more stringent building requirements. Thus, the building only needed to comply with the less restrictive conditions of the Public Health and Building Ordinance of 1903, which required that each building should have a small open space at the rear for natural ventilation purposes; the building height should not be more than the width of the street it faced or 75 feet (whichever was the less); and the depth of each building should not be greater than 40 feet.

== Architectural features ==
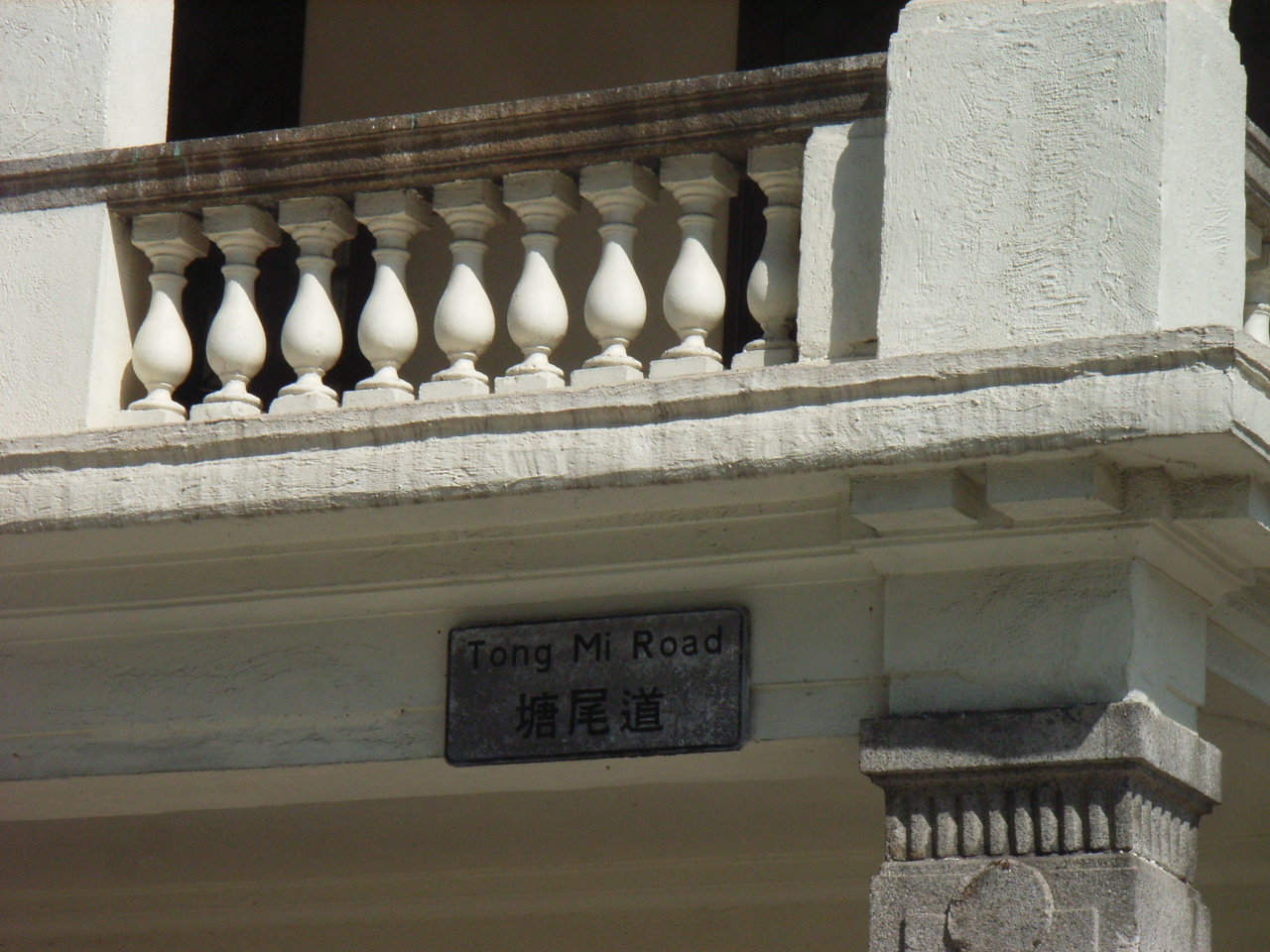
Detail of an urn-shaped balustrade.

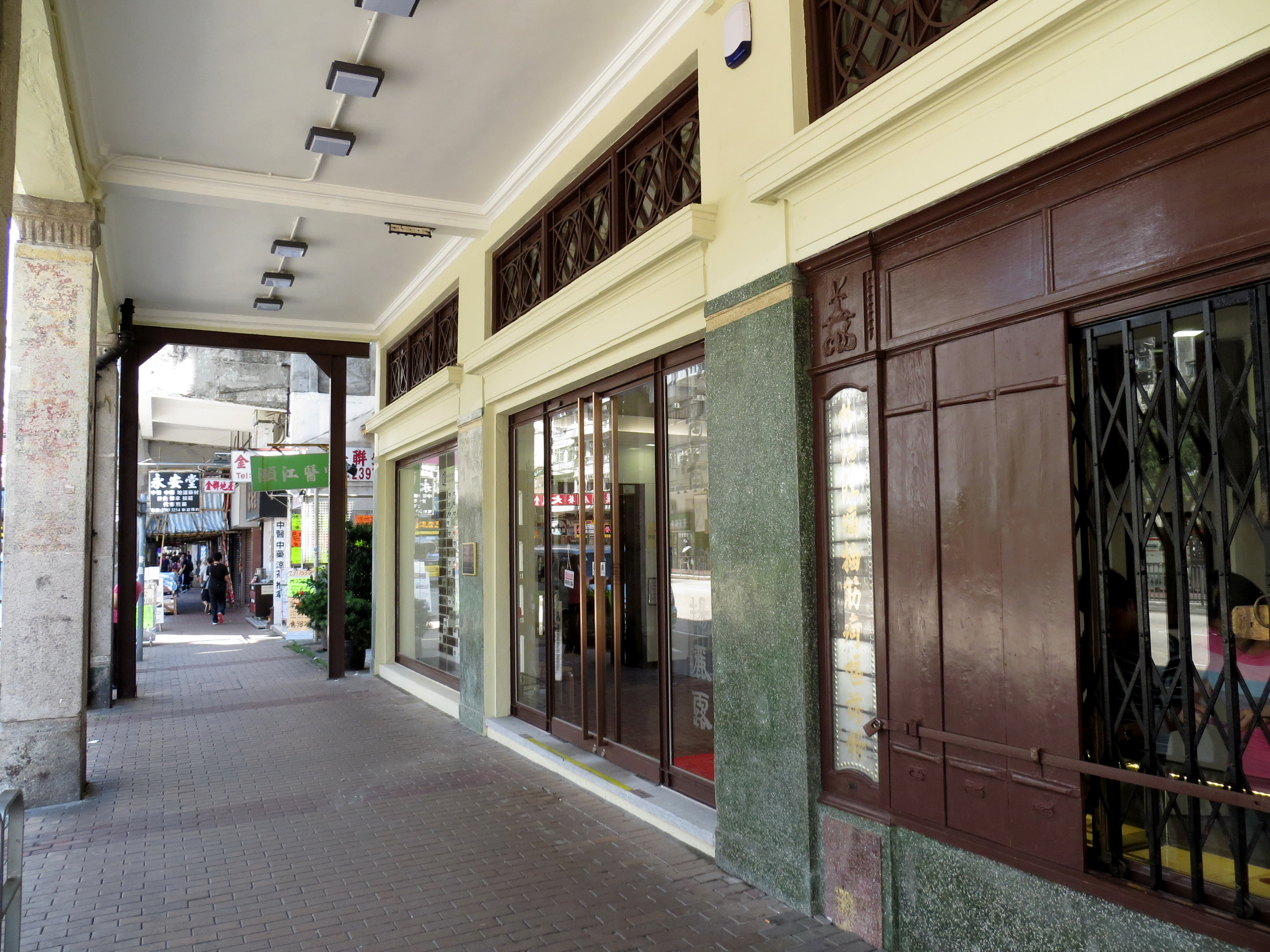
Entrance of the Lui Seng Chun

Being a four-storey building, Lui Seng Chun is a typical "Kee-lau" or "Tong-lau" (Chinese tenement). This type of two-to-four-storey residence integrating Chinese and Western architectural styles was very popular in the early 20th century.

The structural system for Lui Seng Chun consists of reinforced concrete shallow pad foundations supporting granite columns with reinforced concrete beams, floors and walls. Its architecture reflects the Neoclassical style which is characterised by a square-shaped frame and a row of decorative balustrades in front. The deep verandahs were added to prevent rain from flooding the house, block sunlight and keep the indoor area cool. This, together with the stone plaque marked with the name of the medicine shop installed at the top of the building, is typical of pre-war Chinese tenements. The main facade of the building was decorated with ornate classical Italianate designs, one of which is the broken pediment at the shop. The curved front elevation was designed to make better use of the narrow strip of land restricted by the road junction. Structurally, the external walls of the building are made of plastered red brickwork with columns and beams of reinforced concrete.

== Conservation ==
Lui Seng Chun was formerly a Grade I Historic Building. It has been listed as a declared monument since 2022.

=== Adaptive reuse ===
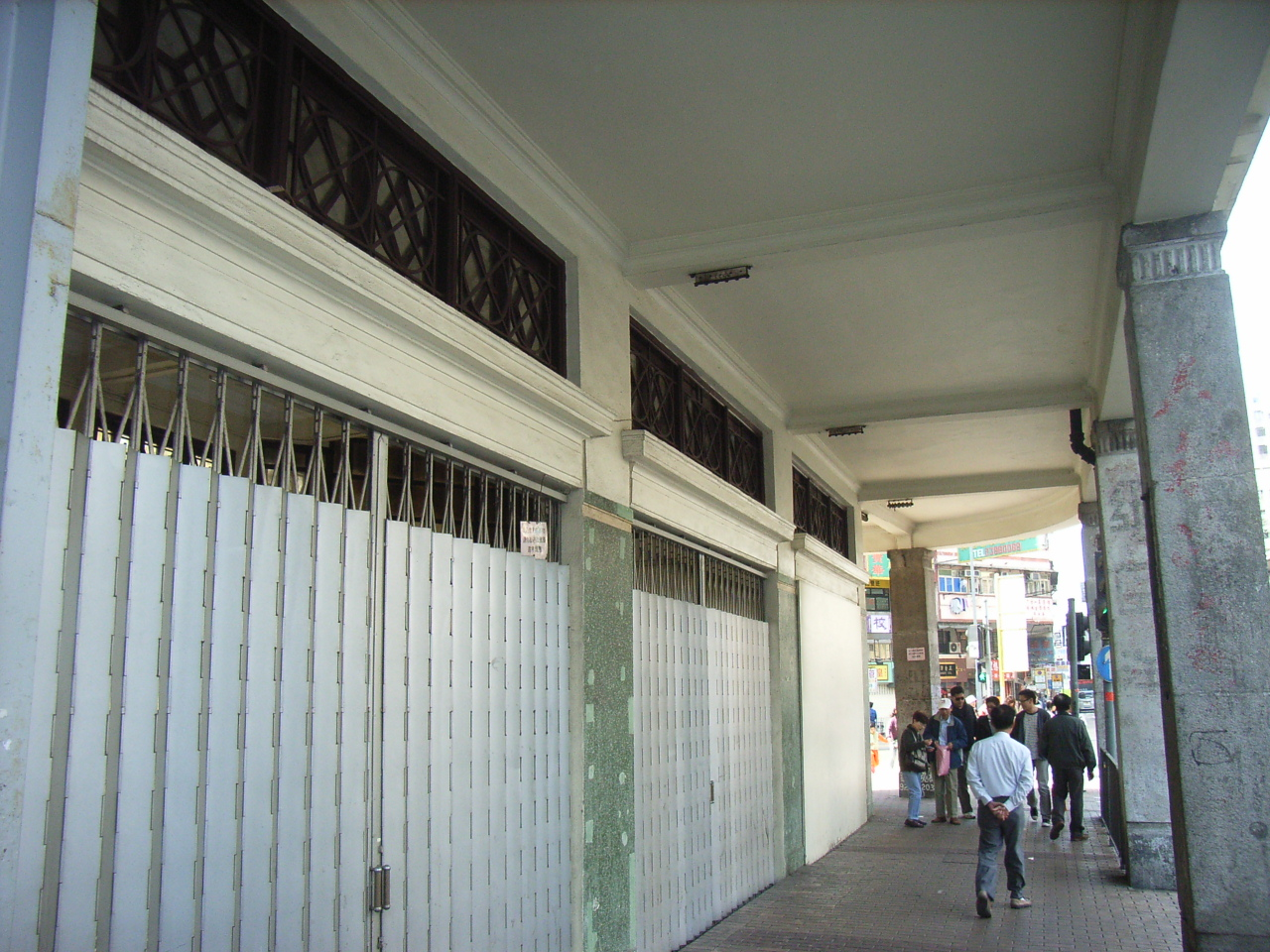
Street level.

The Government of Hong Kong has carried out structural survey and basic repair for this long-vacated building. To revitalise the heritage asset, it is intended to restore and convert the building into a local hub of culture and heritage.

The Government is conducting a study on the adaptive reuse of Lui Seng Chun, with a feasibility study on different possible re-use proposals to be accomplished. Individuals and organisations interested in the future reuse of the building would be invited to submit proposals, with the aim to work out a plan for the proper, sustainable adaptive re-use of the building so that its cultural significance could be displayed.

The future use of the building could be cultural, educational, community, commercial or a combination of the above provided they are compatible with the historical and cultural character of the building. Possible uses include display centre, small-scale performance venue, conference or lecture venue, reading room, herbalist or medicine shop, Chinese tea house, souvenir shop etc. To retain the original character and allow interpretation of the historic building, sufficient space would be reserved for the provision of the display areas on the history of Lui Seng Chun, and the Lui's family.

In 2008, it was part of the seven buildings of Batch I of the Hong Kong Government's Revitalising Historic Buildings Through Partnership Scheme seeking adaptive reuse of government-owned historic buildings. On 17 February 2009, the government declared that the building will be used by the Hong Kong Baptist University as a Chinese Medicine and healthcare centre. The capital cost of the project is estimated at HK$24.8 million. The revitalisation work was completed in early 2012, and the building is now known as Hong Kong Baptist University School of Chinese Medicine – Lui Seng Chun.

== See also ==
- Nos. 600-626 Shanghai Street
