= Nos. 600–626 Shanghai Street =

Coordinates: 22.3198°N 114.1679°E

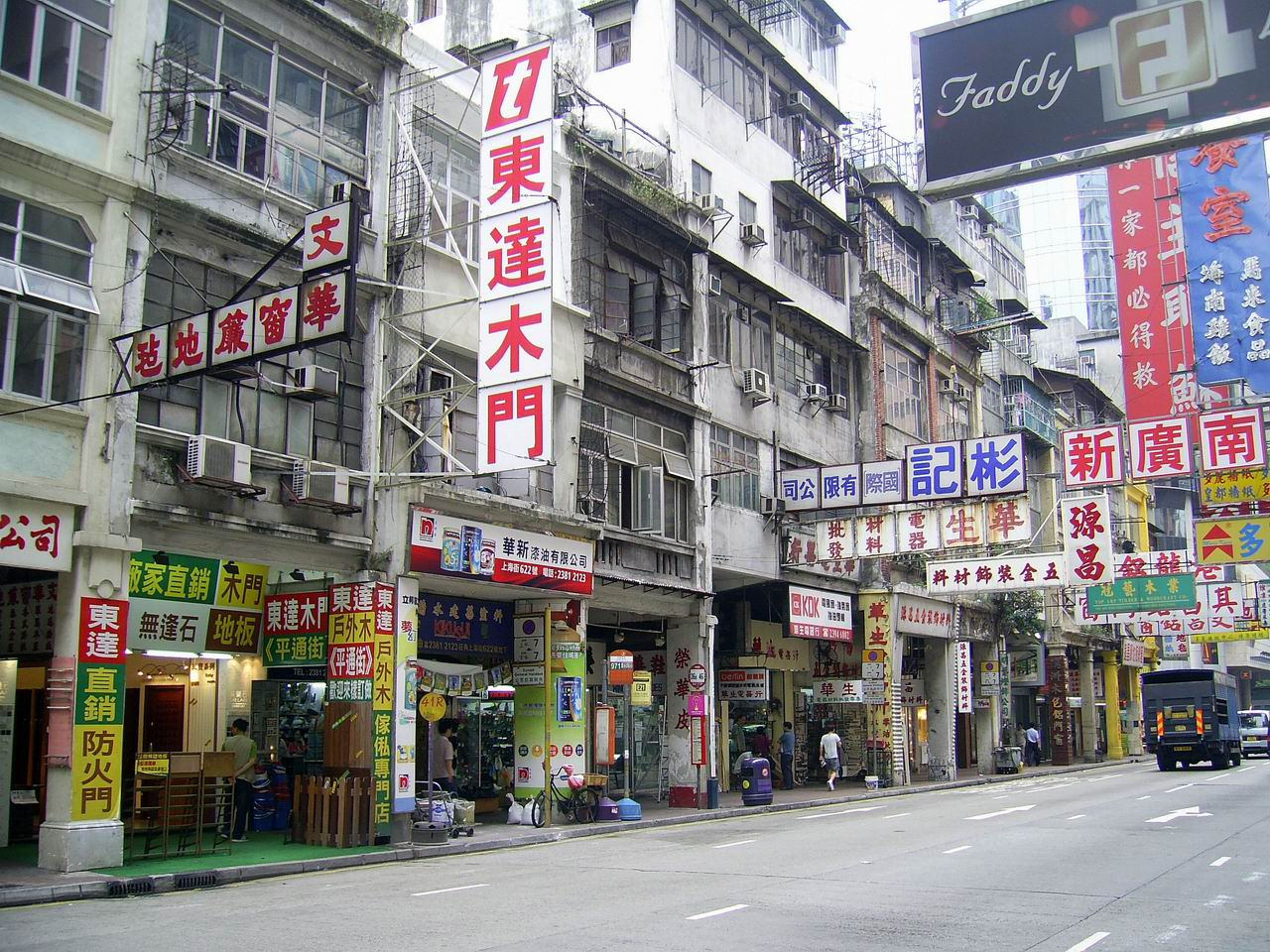
- Nos. 600–626 Shanghai Street, in Mong Kok, Hong Kong, in 2008.
- Interactive map of the Nos. 600–626 Shanghai Street area

General information
- Type: Shophouse
- Architectural style: Tong Lau
- Location: Mong Kok, Shanghai Street, Hong Kong

Design and construction
- Designations: Grade I historical buildings

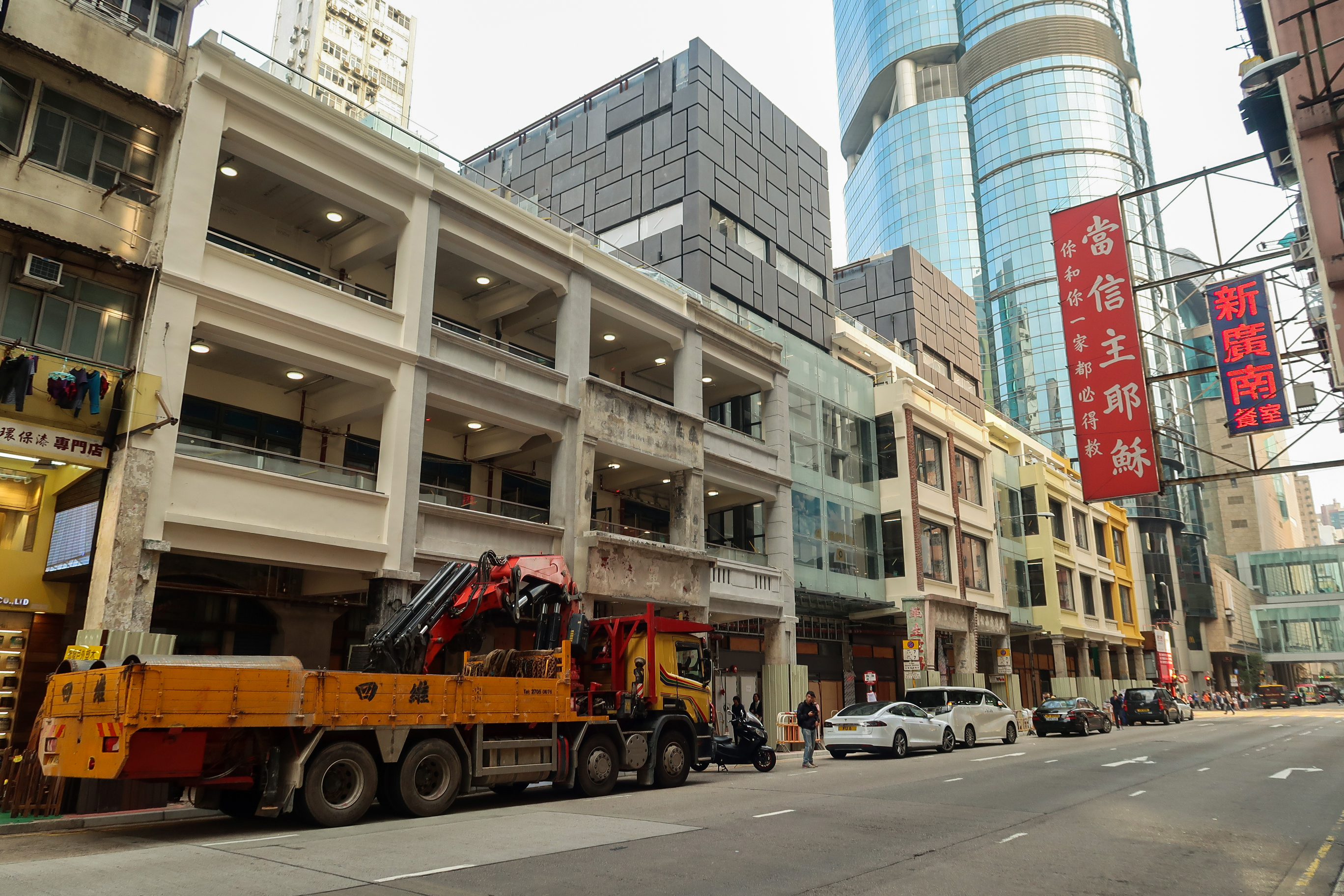
Nos. 600–626 Shanghai Street in 2019.

Nos. 600–626 Shanghai Street, or more specifically Nos. 600, 602, 604, 606, 612, 614, 620, 622, 624 and 626, is a group of ten pre-war shophouses (tong-lau) in the Mong Kok section of Shanghai Street, in Hong Kong, that have been listed as Grade I historical buildings for their historical value.

== Background ==
Shophouses in Hong Kong and southern China are commonly known as tong-lau (Chinese: 唐樓) or kee-lau (Chinese: 騎樓). They were usually built in contiguous blocks and ranged from three to five storeys in height with verandahs or balconies facing the street. Shophouses were used for both commercial and residential purposes. The ground floor was usually devoted to family businesses like small stores and clothes selling while the upper floors were for residential purpose with sub-tenancy and renting of beds. The number of shophouses has declined sharply by the 21st century.

== History of shophouses ==
Shophouses were mainly occupied by Chinese and predominantly seen all over southern Chinese cities and town in the 19th century. There were various reasons for the existence of tong lau in Hong Kong, which including economic development of Hong Kong, Second World War and also the influx of Chinese migrants to Hong Kong.

In 1898, the government introduced the building and public health ordinance which defined all the buildings including tong lau. In 1903, the government introduced a maximum height per storey of 9 feet (2.7 m), with a four-storey limit. This explains the general appearance of tong lau. Yet, the ordinance changed in 1964, so no tong lau were built from then on.

These ten shophouses in Shanghai Street are believed to have been built in the 1920s and 1930s, which are typical of an old commercial street. These typical shophouses are composed of shops on the ground floor which open up to a public arcade or "five-foot way", and low-rented residential accommodations upstairs. Shops like selling furnishings, building construction materials (such as window frames, curtains, paint and hardware), traditional Chinese utensils, Chinese and Western household kitchen tools, ceremonial items, traditional Chinese wedding gowns, grocery, snake soup as well as traditional Nepalese snacks can be found in Shanghai Street.

Nowadays, Nos. 600–606, 612–614 and 620–626 are retained as pre-World War II structures with some recent buildings erected in between. It is believed that Nos. 620 – 626 are the oldest buildings among them. In view of their historical and architectural merit, the Shanghai Street shophouses were classified as a Grade I historical buildings by the Antiquities Advisory Board since 2000.

As part of Hong Kong's living heritage, those shop houses are still functional in their communities and play important roles in the lives of local people. In recent years, residents and individuals have refurbished some shophouses and converted them into restaurants, shops or artists' interaction center like Shanghai Street Artspace project managed by the Department of Creative Arts of the Hong Kong Institute of Education (HKIEd) aiming to explore, develop and learn from the artistic culture of Yau Ma Tei.

== Architecture ==
=== External ===
Chinese tenement buildings in Shanghai Street are good examples of typical shophouses of pre-World War II times. The shophouses combined Chinese and Western architectural features. The Chinese component was based on building design from southern China, mainly in Guangdong Province. European influences were usually Neoclassical.

Building in contiguous blocks in elongated layout, the narrow frontage is one of the characteristics of tong-lau. Shophouses in Shanghai Street are basically three storeys high, but additional accommodation built on the roofs makes them make them look like four-storey building. They are classified as "Verandah Type" shophouses because they have verandahs at each floor level facing the street, which is now enclosed with glazing. The verandahs are supported by columns and project over the pavement, forming an arcade for pedestrians. This type of development is now obsolete as it was discontinued after the Second World War.

There is not much decoration on the facade of the shophouses. Only moulded capitals to the columns and lozenge shaped grille blocks forming balustrades to the verandahs exists in some of the shophouses.

=== Internal ===
Internally, mezzanine floors and cocklofts are constructed to form extra bed spaces compounding the overcrowding problem. There are no toilets or bathrooms, all ablutions had to perform in the kitchens at the rear.

The architectural characteristics of shophouses can reflect the live of the middle class, which is the majority of the society at that time during the post-war period. Architectural features such as concrete railings, and external renderings, using Shanghai plaster, were expensive to do at that time.

== Social value ==
In spite of the dilapidated condition and various alterations and refurbishment works, the shophouses are very good and fairly authentic examples of typical shophouses of the pre-war period. It is because almost all their original building materials and decorations are preserved.

Verandah type shophouses are now rare in Hong Kong due to the prohibition of arcades under the building ordinances in the 1960s. Therefore, shophouses have considerable built heritage value as well as social value and local interest.

== Neighbouring historic buildings ==
The Shanghai Street shophouses are geographically close to a number of historic buildings, namely Lui Seng Chun (Grade I), Old Kowloon Police Headquarters (Grade II), Shui Yuet Temple (水月宮, Grade III), All Saints' Church (諸聖堂, Grade III), and the shophouses at Nos. 190, 192, 194, 196, 198, 200, 202, 204, 210, 212 Prince Edward Road West (Grade II).

== Preservation ==
In September 2008, the Urban Renewal Authority (URA) announced two heritage conservation plans, which proposed to preserve the ten blocks of pre-war shophouses on Shanghai Street in Mong Kok and ten other blocks on Prince Edward Road East. Four 1960s buildings which dissect the shophouse cluster in Shanghai Street are also included in the project. The Shanghai Street project covers an area of about 1,128m^{2}. The project aims to preserve and revitalise these shophouse clusters for commercial uses.

The projects, which costs HK$1.33 billion, is the largest single conservation initiative ever undertaken in Hong Kong. This conservation plan is the initiative of the expanded conservation strategy for 48 pre-war shophouses across Hong Kong.

The URA has two alternatives: to buy property rights of the shop houses and redevelop them into commercial or other uses; to re-zone them so as to limit the use of those shop houses for preservation purposes. Most of the cost, about $1.23 billion, would be spent on property acquisition and tenants' rehousing of the 73 households with 220 residents in the two sites' 24 buildings. The remaining one-tenth of the sum is used for renovation.

For shophouses in Shanghai Street, necessary building services such as lifts, fire escapes and disabled access for the shophouses would be built in the 1960s buildings. The exact usage of the revamped shophouses has not been determined and is open to any options. One of the tentative suggestions is to house low-priced restaurant so that the public will have opportunities to use the verandas. The proposed aim is transforming Shanghai Street into a popular food street, or directly translated from the Chinese as "Food Paradise".

In addition, the authority plans to reserve the shops upstairs for the arts community, such as bookstores and dance studios. The cluster of shophouses on Prince Edward Road East would be remained as a part of the flower market so that the thriving flower trade would not be disrupted.

The Prince Edward Road East project and the Shanghai Street project are expected to be completed by 2014 and 2015 respectively. But some people see problems with the URA's plans: not so much capital a conservation strategy as an acquisition or buy-out of properties; elimination of Shanghai Street true character by removing the stores and residents.
