= Tung Tak Pawn Shop =

Demolished pawn shop in Hong Kong

Coordinates: 22.27895°N 114.17962°E

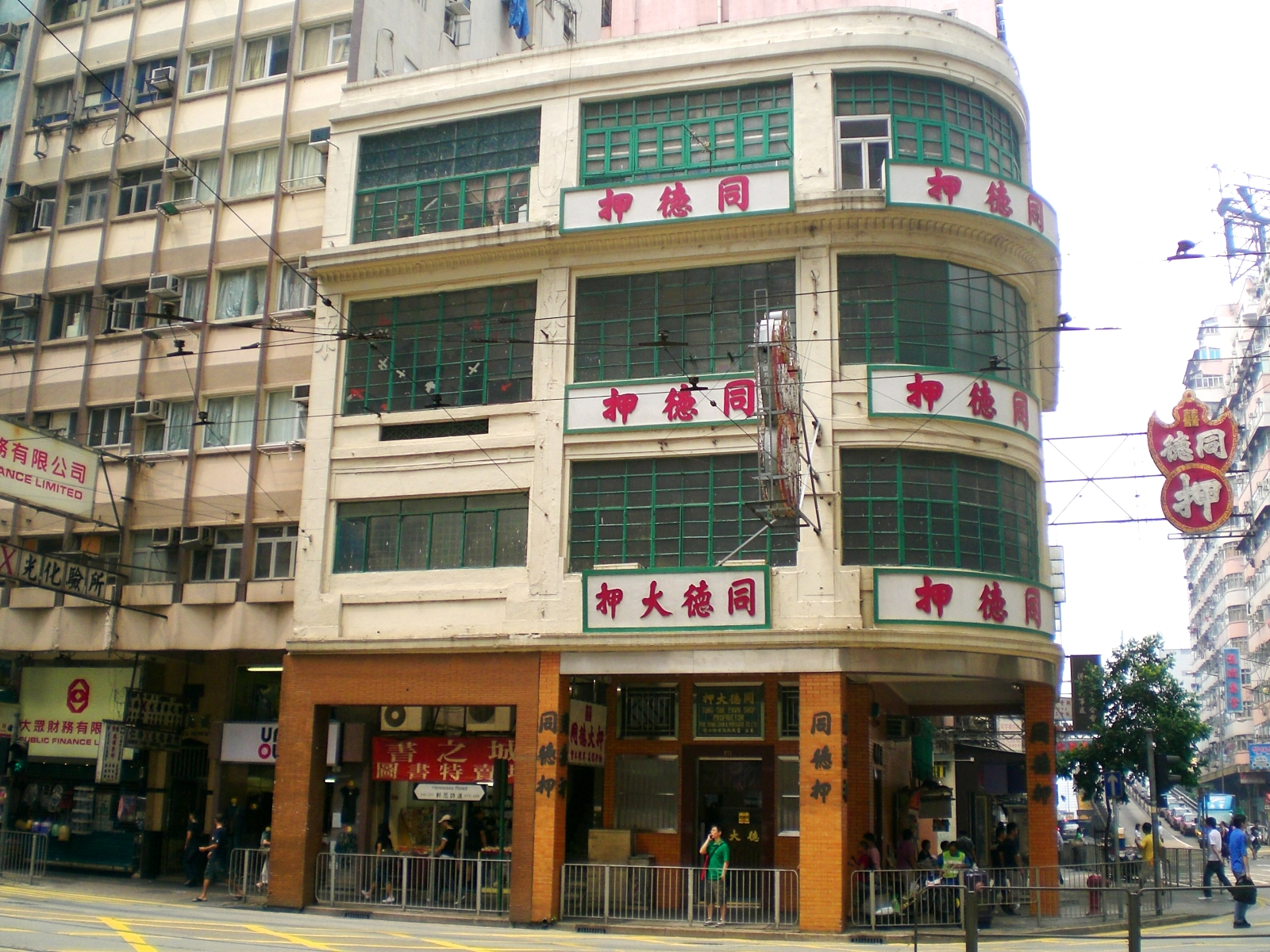
Tung Tak Pawn Shop in 2007.

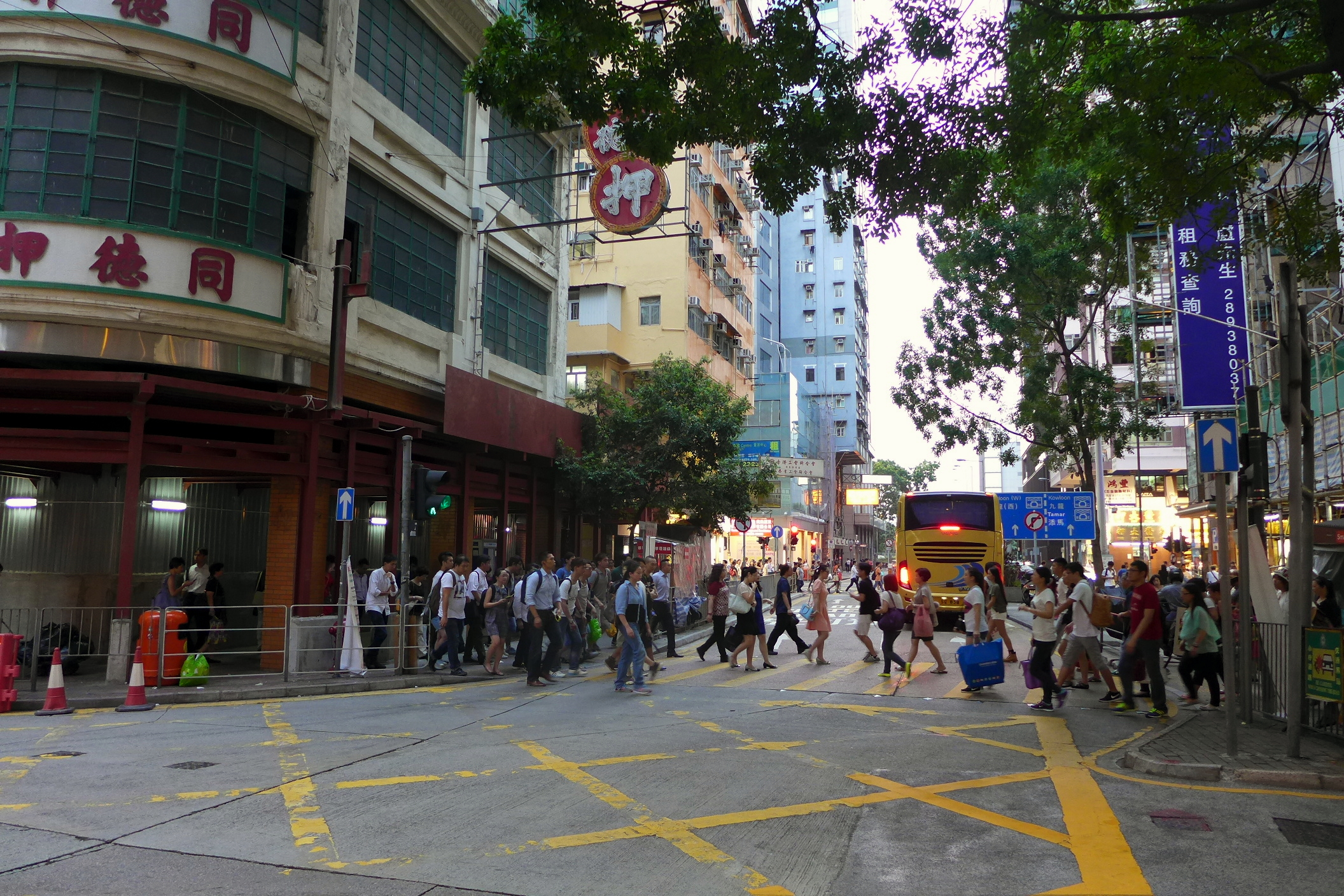
Marsh Street in August 2015, with Tung Tak Pawn Shop on the left.

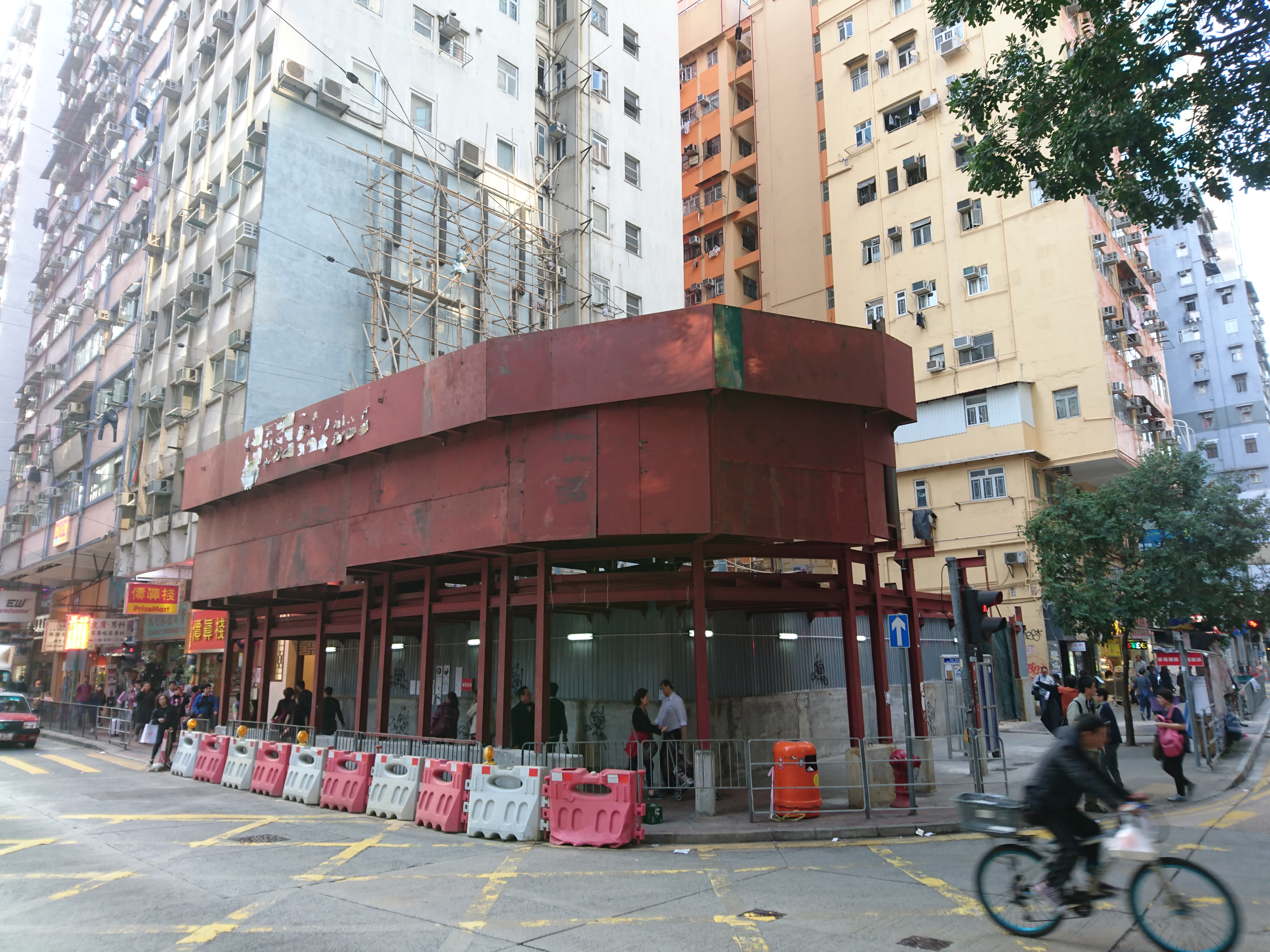
Site of the demolished Tung Tak Pawn Shop in November 2015.

Tung Tak Pawn Shop (Chinese: 同德押), also referred to as Nos. 369 & 371 Hennessy Road, is a former pawn shop and Grade III historic building in Wan Chai, Hong Kong. It was demolished in 2015.

== History ==
No. 371 Hennessy Road was probably built in the 1930s, following the completion of the Praya East Reclamation Scheme of 1921–1931. Initially used as a commercial building, it was later used as a pawn shop.

== Architecture ==
No. 371 Hennessy Road was designed by the Hong Kong based architecture firm Raven and Basto. The firm was active from 1922-1937, and was responsible for high profile buildings such as the Chinese Renaissance style mansion King Yin Lei (Chinese: 景賢里) on stubbs road, the grade II historic building St. Louis School, and the grade III historic building Shing Kwong Church.

The building was built in the International Modern architectural style popular in the 1930s. It is a Verandah Type Shophouse of traditional type.

== See also ==
- Pawnbrokers in Hong Kong
- Tong lau
