= Timeline of the 2019–2020 Hong Kong protests (August 2019) =

August events of the 2019–2020 pro-democracy demonstrations in Hong Kong

Timeline of the 2019–2020 Hong Kong protests
2019			March–June				July	August	September	October	November	December
2020	January	February	March	April	May	June	July	August	September	October	November	December
2021	January	February	March	April	May	June	July	August	September–November			December

The month of August 2019 in the 2019–2020 Hong Kong protests saw a continuation of protests throughout the city. Several of the peaceful daytime protests were held by social groups such as families, the elderly, and various professions. In many instances, peaceful protests occurs during the day, turning increasingly violent at night. In North Point and Tsuen Wan, white- or blue-shirted armed groups were attacking protesters, but unlike in the Yuen Long violence of 21 July they were beaten back in North Point. Protesters aimed at drawing international attention through methods such as extended sit-ins at the airport. In many occasions, an eye injury of a female protester who had served as frontline medical staff became a symbol of the protests. At the airport protests, a mainland journalist was violently tackled by protesters who did not reveal his identity to the protesters. Protesters later apologised for this incident, reducing tensions and satisfying some pro-establishment lawmakers. The Prince Edward station attack on 31 August proved to be a further landmark event in the protests.

== Events ==
=== 1 and 3 August rallies ===
==== Financial sector ====
On the night of 1 August, hundreds of staff from about 80 different financial institutions participated in a flash mob rally at Chater Garden in Admiralty. Protesters were concerned about incidents of alleged police collusion with triad gangsters and demanded respect for rule of law. At least 700 financial sector workers have posted images of staff cards in support of the upcoming 5 August city-wide general strike. The organiser stated 4,300 attended the flash-mob.

==== Medical sector ====
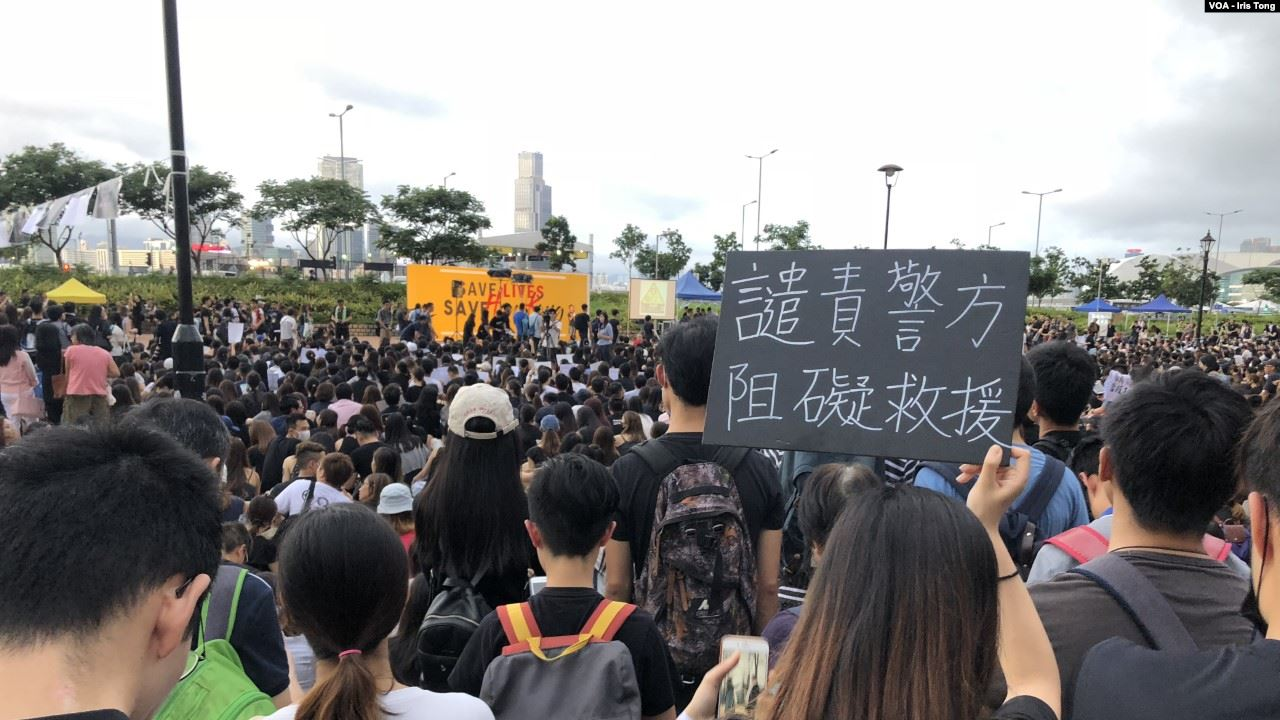
Medical professionals in the rally on 2 August, with the banner "Condemn police obstructing rescue operation" in Chinese.

On the evening of 2 August, medical professionals held a rally at Edinburgh Place, Central. President of the Hong Kong Public Doctors' Association spoke critically of arrests being made inside hospitals while people are seeking treatment, and also spoke out about excessive use of tear gas by police against protesters. Organisers estimated that 10,000 medical professionals attended the rally.

This was the third medical sector protest in a week. About 1,500 health care specialists had previously assembled at Queen Elizabeth Hospital in Yau Ma Tei to raise concerns about the coordinated attacks of 21 July that occurred in Yuen Long MTR station. Medical students and graduates also held an assembly in the Chinese University of Hong Kong on 26 July. About 1000 people joined the assembly according to the organisers.

==== Civil servants ====
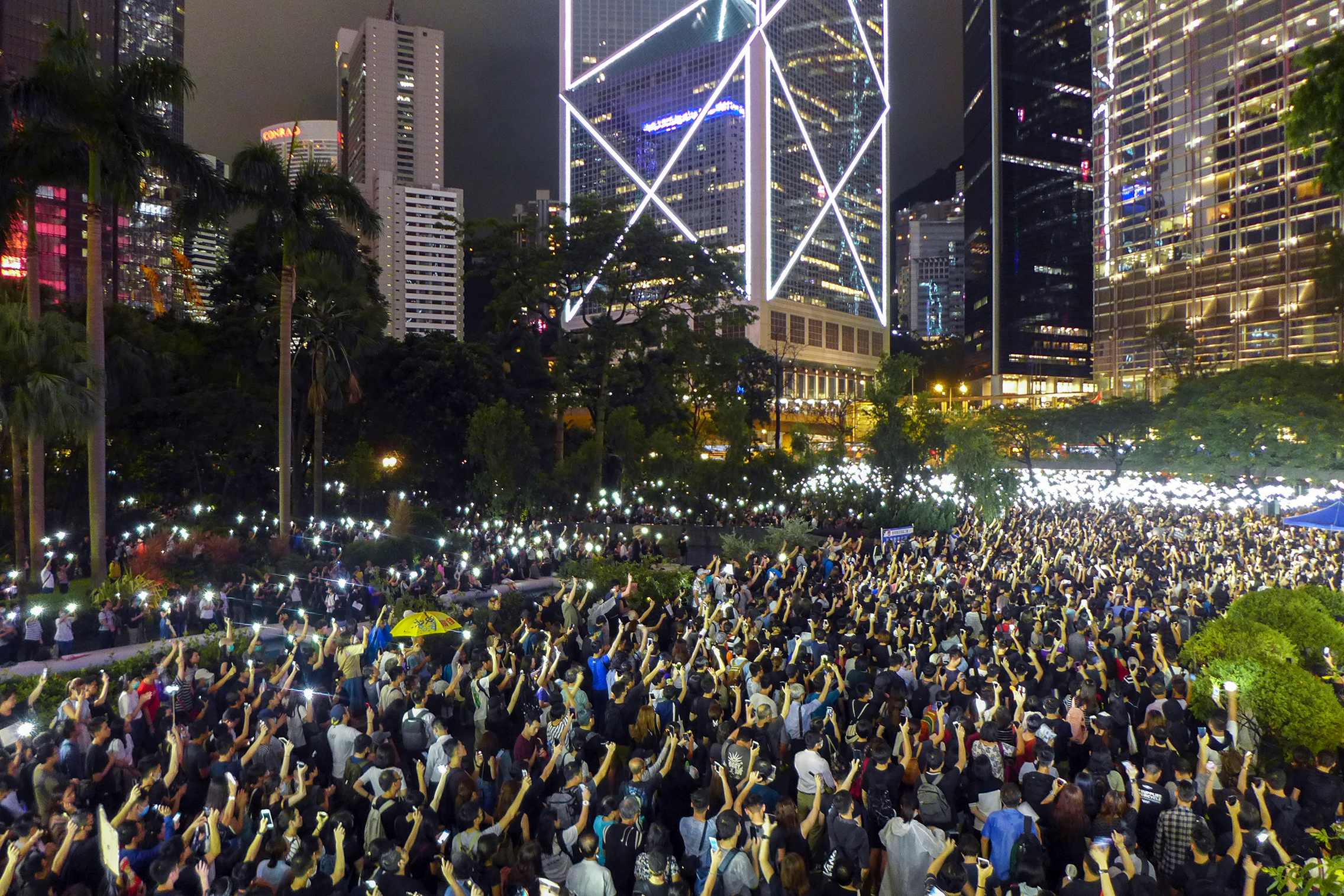
Civil servant rally on 2 August.

Shortly after the medical sector rally began at Edinburgh Place, another rally had also started in Chater Garden held by thousands of civil servants. By 6:45 pm the park was already overflowing with people, prompting police to close nearby Chater Road to traffic. Former chief secretary Anson Chan and former Secretary for the Civil Service Joseph Wong both urged an independent inquiry into police misconduct and defended freedom of expression, questioning the validity of Chief Secretary Matthew Cheung's warning about the risks of joining the rally and "breaching the principle of political neutrality." Wong stated, "The first line [of the civil service code], which I wrote, is to safeguard the rule of law. Rule of law is higher than our loyalty to any official, any chief executive. No one is above it."

Musician and activist Denise Ho also spoke at the rally, and encouraged broad participation at the upcoming 5 August general strike. Ho said that there was safety in numbers, and that the government is more likely to respond to continuous pressure and indefinite strike actions. While police estimated attendance of 13,000, the organiser claimed 40,000 civil servants participated at the rally.

=== Ma On Shan police station blockades ===
==== 1 August ====
On 1 August, a police station in Ma On Shan was surrounded by a large number of protesters demanding the release of demonstrators facing riot charges from the previous week's protest. Photos show protesters hurling bricks that were dug out from pavements towards the police station, shattering windows. At around 3:50 am, riot police cleared away the protesters.

==== 2 August ====
On 2 August, hundreds of protesters gathered in response to police raids and arrests made for possession of protest supplies. At 11 pm, a crowd assembled near the Sha Tin police station and constructed barricades. By 1 am the protest shifted to the Ma On Shan police station, after protesters received word that the eight arrested individuals were being held there. Protesters attempted to pry open the metal shutters, vandalised building walls, and removed the "Ma On Shan Police Station" sign. Riot police arrived on the scene and by 3:15 am the crowds had dispersed.

==== 3 August ====
On 3 August, protesters returned to Ma On Shan police station for the second consecutive night. They demanded the release of the eight arrested protesters, including pro-independence activist Andy Chan Ho-tin, who had been arrested the day before during a police raid on a building in Fo Tan and charged on suspicion of offensive weapons. The group of about 100 protesters banged on the metal shutters, threw hell money to curse the officers inside, and some painted graffiti messages such as "liberate Hong Kong" and "all consequences are at your own risk." Riot police began clearing the crowds at 10:45 pm. The police attempted to enter Park Belvedere, a private residential building, angering both protesters and residents. The police also allegedly threw pepper bombs at people on a bridge.

=== 3 August protests ===
A planned and approved march started from Anchor Street Playground at 3:30 pm. Protesters in the front of the rally held a banner that read "Police have too much power" (Chinese: 警權過大); a popular slogan for the day was "Liberate Hong Kong, the revolution of our time". Marchers urged people to join in the general strike on 5 August. The front of the rally arrived at Cherry Street park at 5 pm, but some protesters did not follow the designated route, and headed directly to Mong Kok and Tsim Sha Tsui instead; other protesters first arrived at the park and then followed on to Mong Kok and Tsim Sha Tsui.

At around 6:30 pm, protesters moved barricades into the toll plaza of the Cross-Harbour Tunnel in Hung Hom, blocking vehicles and then disappeared. Around 9:30 pm, riot police fired tear gas on protesters in both Tsim Sha Tsui and Mong Kok. Several arrests were made. A small group of protesters also removed the Chinese flag near the Star Ferry pier in Tsim Sha Tsui and threw it into Victoria Harbour.

After having received multiple shots of tear gas, protesters moved to the police station at Wong Tai Sin, then left via MTR. Riot police followed and arrested several alleged protesters in the Wong Tai Sin station. However, the presence of riot police officers angered nearby residents, who requested police to release those arrested and leave the district. They threw umbrellas and set off fire extinguishers. Shortly after, police officers fired tear gas at residents to disperse the crowd, which then went to protest at the nearby police station and Disciplined Services quarters. Dormitory residents showered residents and protesters with sticks, glass bottles and firecrackers from the building. After multiple shots of tear gas, protesters retreated and occupied Lung Cheung Road, then dispersed after.

At the same time, multiple protesters surrounded Mong Kok Police Station. Riot police also arrived shortly and arrested protesters. Some of those arrested stated that they were only passers-by or local residents, and not protesters. Two foreign nationals, a Filipino and a South Korean, were arrested by authorities who suspects their involvement in the protest. The Filipino was Hong Kong Disneyland employee who was wearing black at the time of his arrest and the South Korean a restaurant worker. This is believed to be the first arrests of expatriates since the escalation of the protest in June.

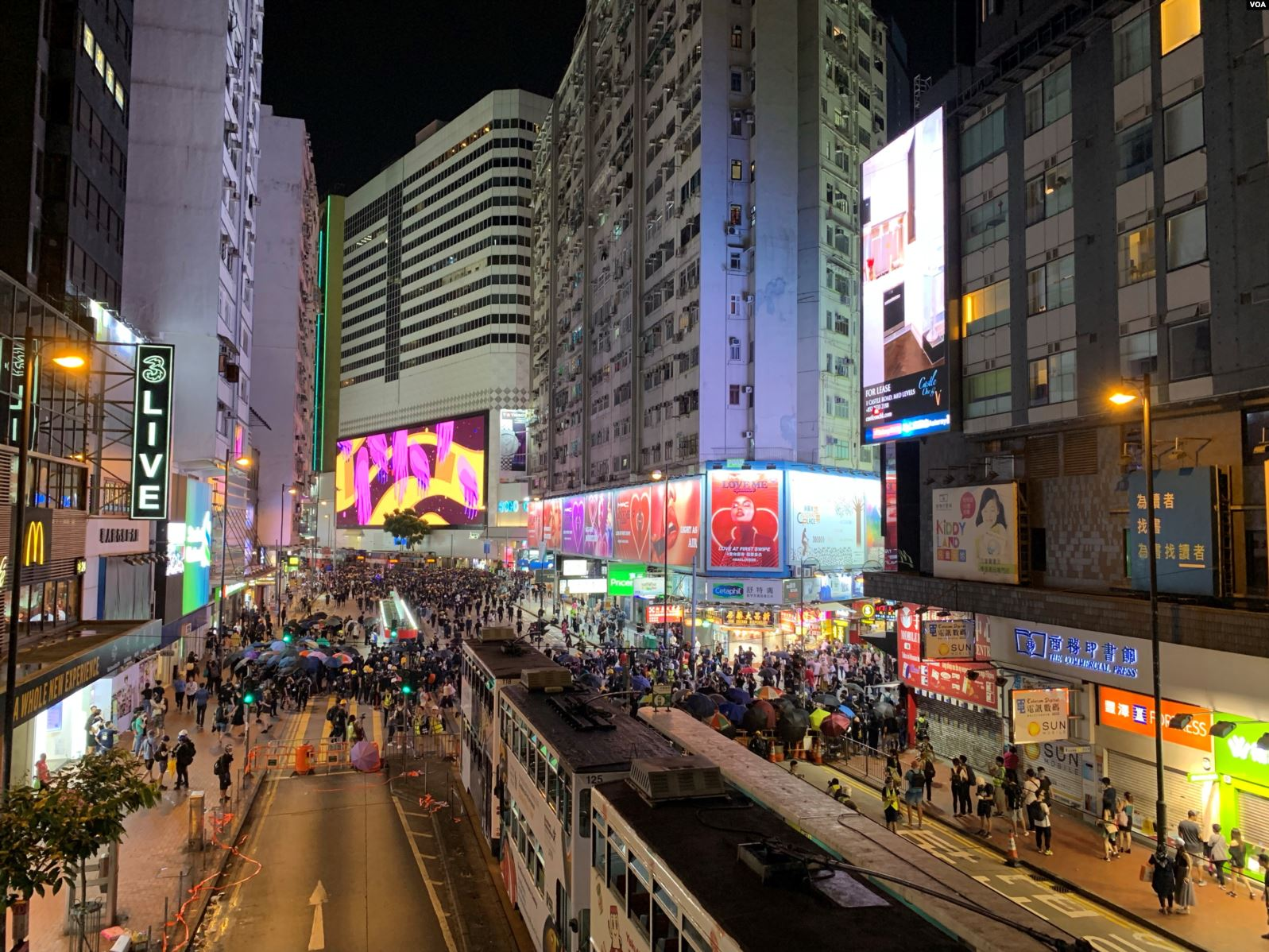
Protesters in Causeway Bay on 4 August.

=== 4 August protests ===
The demonstrations on 4 August began with a permitted march in Tseung Kwan O, starting from Po Tsui Park at 2 pm, with organisers stating around 150,000 protesters in attendance. During the rally, protesters threw bricks towards the police station breaking windows. They chanted "Hong Kong police knowingly break the law" and "Shame on the corrupt police". Police officers then appeared with police dogs and protesters dispersed. At night, the crowds occupied Po Shun Road. Riot police arrived to disperse crowds, and they unreasonably attacked a passer-by.

Another rally appeared in Kennedy Town after the Tseung Kwan O rally. By the evening, protesters defied the police ban and marched towards Sheung Wan. However, by about 7 pm police deployed tear gas canisters and routed the group to Causeway Bay, where thousands of protesters setup blockades and occupied areas of the shopping district. Then again by 10 pm riot police attempted to clear the streets with the use of tear gas.

Near the end of the Kennedy Town protest, some protesters went and blocked the Cross-Harbour Tunnel and a small group of protesters sprayed graffiti on the sculpture at the Golden Bauhinia Square. At the same time, a group of protesters gathered at Wong Tai Sin police station, protesting their way of force to the residents in the 3 August protest. Fearing that the police may deploy heavy force following 3 August scuffles, some protesters opted to occupy sections in Ngau Tau Kok and Kwun Tong. At night, various protests and police operations were done in Mei Foo, Wong Tai Sin, Tin Shui Wai, Ma On Shan, and Lam Tin. Eastern Harbour Crossing and Tseung Kwan O Tunnel were temporarily blocked during the protests.

=== 5 August general strike ===
There was a city-wide general strike on 5 August, with protests and sit-ins in different districts. The Cross-Harbour Tunnel was affected by street blockades, major roadways were obstructed and train lines stalled, as thousands of workers across 20 different sectors participated, putting pressure on the government to meet protesters' demands. At least seven major rallies and organising assemblies were held throughout areas of Hong Kong. The main rallies took place in Tamar Park in Admiralty, Sha Tin Town Hall, Tuen Mun Park, Discovery Park in Tsuen Wan, Wong Tai Sin Square, MacPherson Playground in Mong Kok and Tin Hau Temple Fung Shui Square in Tai Po.

Workers from various industries as well as several trade unions had announced in advance that they would join the strike. The government of Hong Kong issued a statement, urging citizens to not participate in the strike as it would "undermine further the local economy that is facing downside risks." Employees at Hong Kong Disneyland announced work stoppages. Many air traffic controllers called in sick, and over 200 flights were cancelled while only one of the airport runways was operational.

Carrie Lam held a press conference at 10 am, condemning those who joined the strike, and stated that they are "destroying Hong Kong". She continued to support the police force and rejected the five demands by protesters. Pro-Beijing legislator Ann Chiang voiced her disappointment towards Lam's speech with a Facebook post, stating that Lam had raised many issues but offered no solutions. Meanwhile, the Hang Seng Index started to drop during Lam's conference and fell 2.9% by the midday break.

In the evening, protesters near the North Point neighbourhood and Tsuen Wan were attacked by two groups of stick wielding men, some wearing white shirts and another group in professionally printed blue shirts. The scuffles were brief and unexpected, and similar in nature to the 21 July Yuen Long attacks. However, unlike the Yuen Long attacks, protesters in North Point fought back. Later in the night several police stations were blockaded by protesters and vandalised. Police arrested 148 people by the end of the day. To disperse the protesters, the police force used more than 800 canisters of tear gas, a record number for Hong Kong, in 14 out of 18 districts in Hong Kong. As the police used tear gas in close proximity to many densely populated residential areas, many residents, children, and pets were affected.

On 6 August, Chairwoman Carol Ng of the Confederation of Trade Unions (HKCTU) stated: "If there is still no proper response from the government ... I presume it is possible to have another strike." The HKCTU helped to organise the 5 August general strike. They estimated 350,000 people had joined the strike. About 290,000 attended protests and rallies city-wide, while the remainder stayed home and away from work that day.

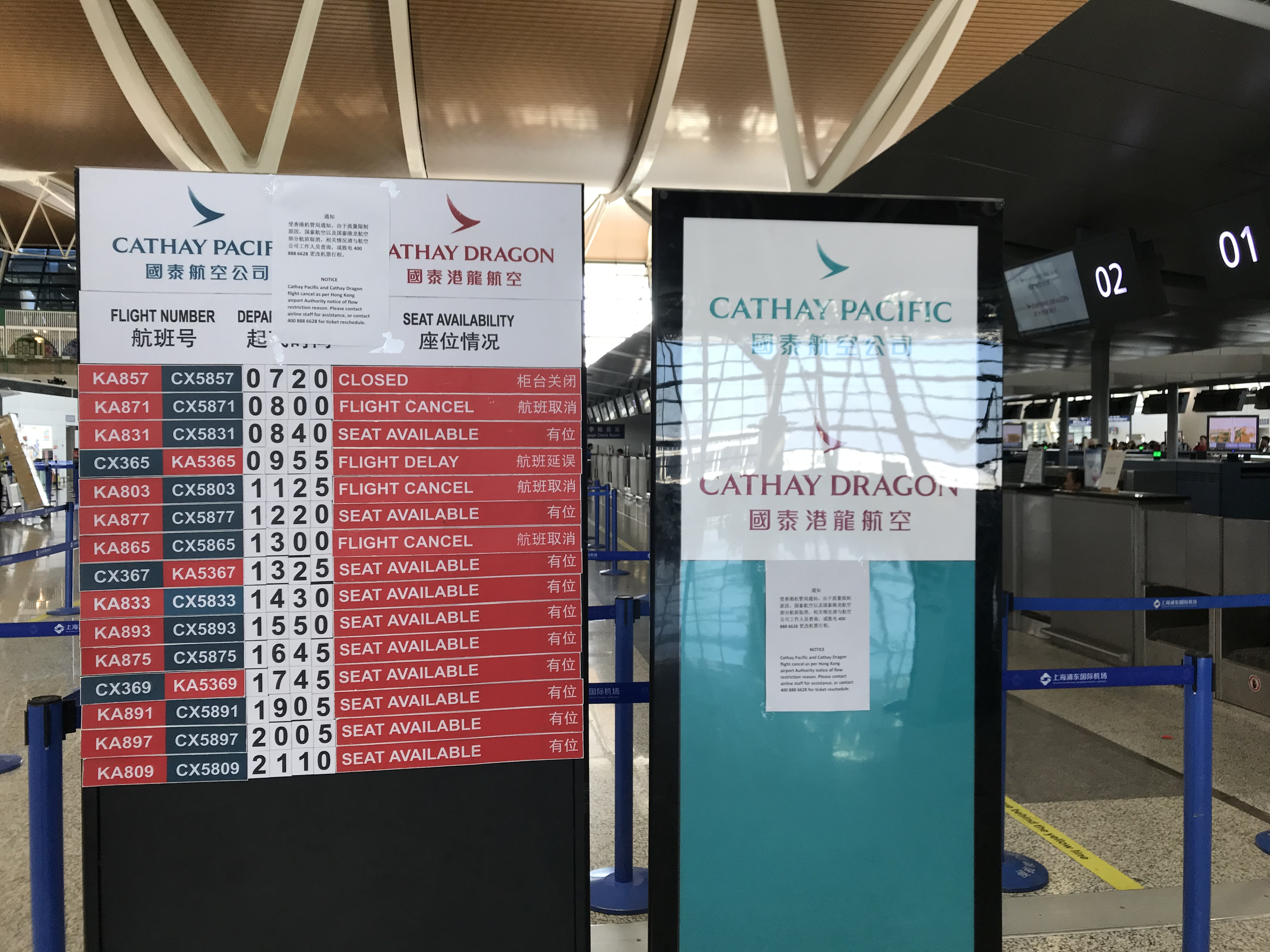
Flights cancelled by Cathay Pacific shown in a notice board in Shanghai Pudong International Airport

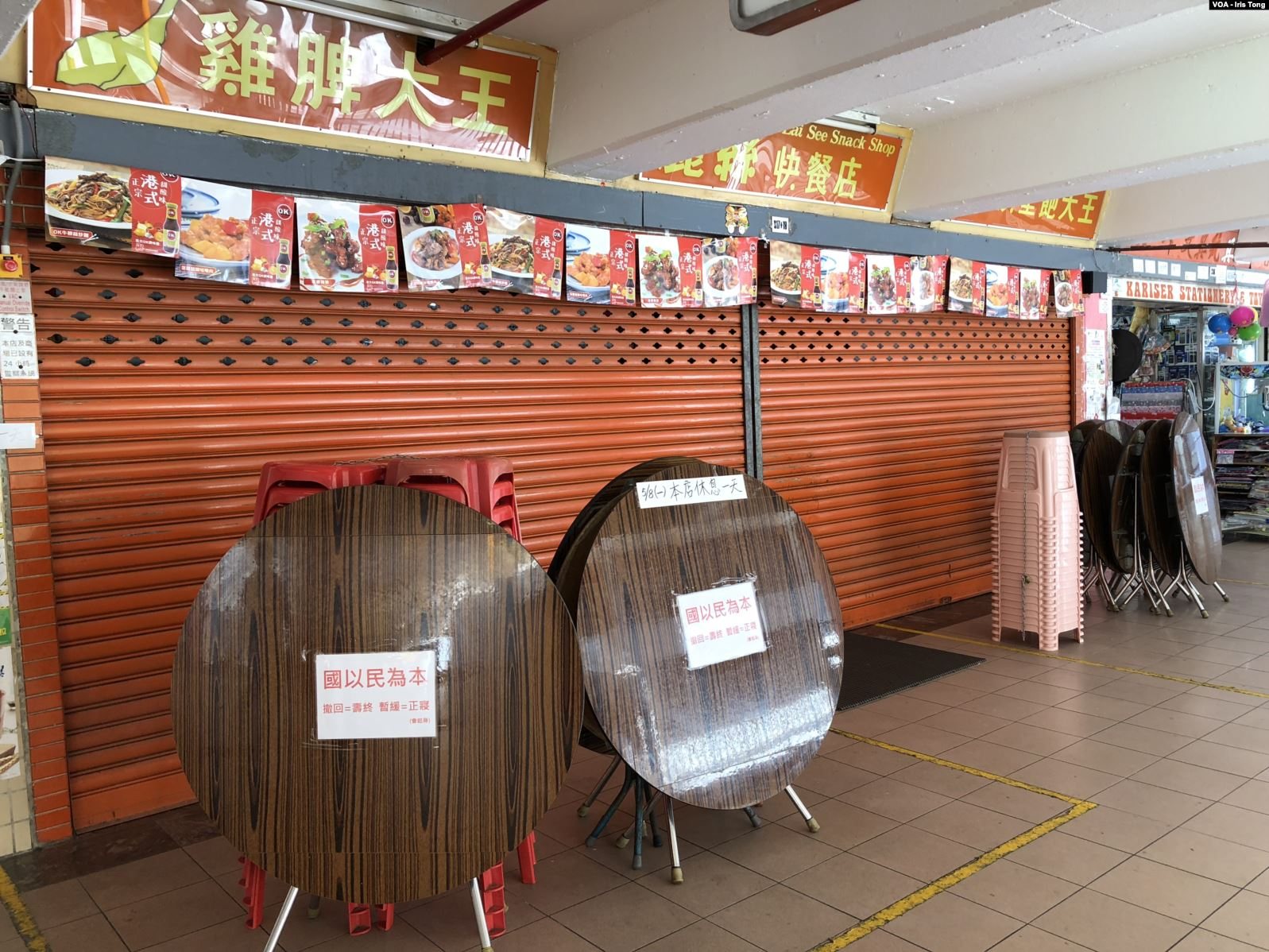
A restaurant in Wah Fu Estate participating in the general strike

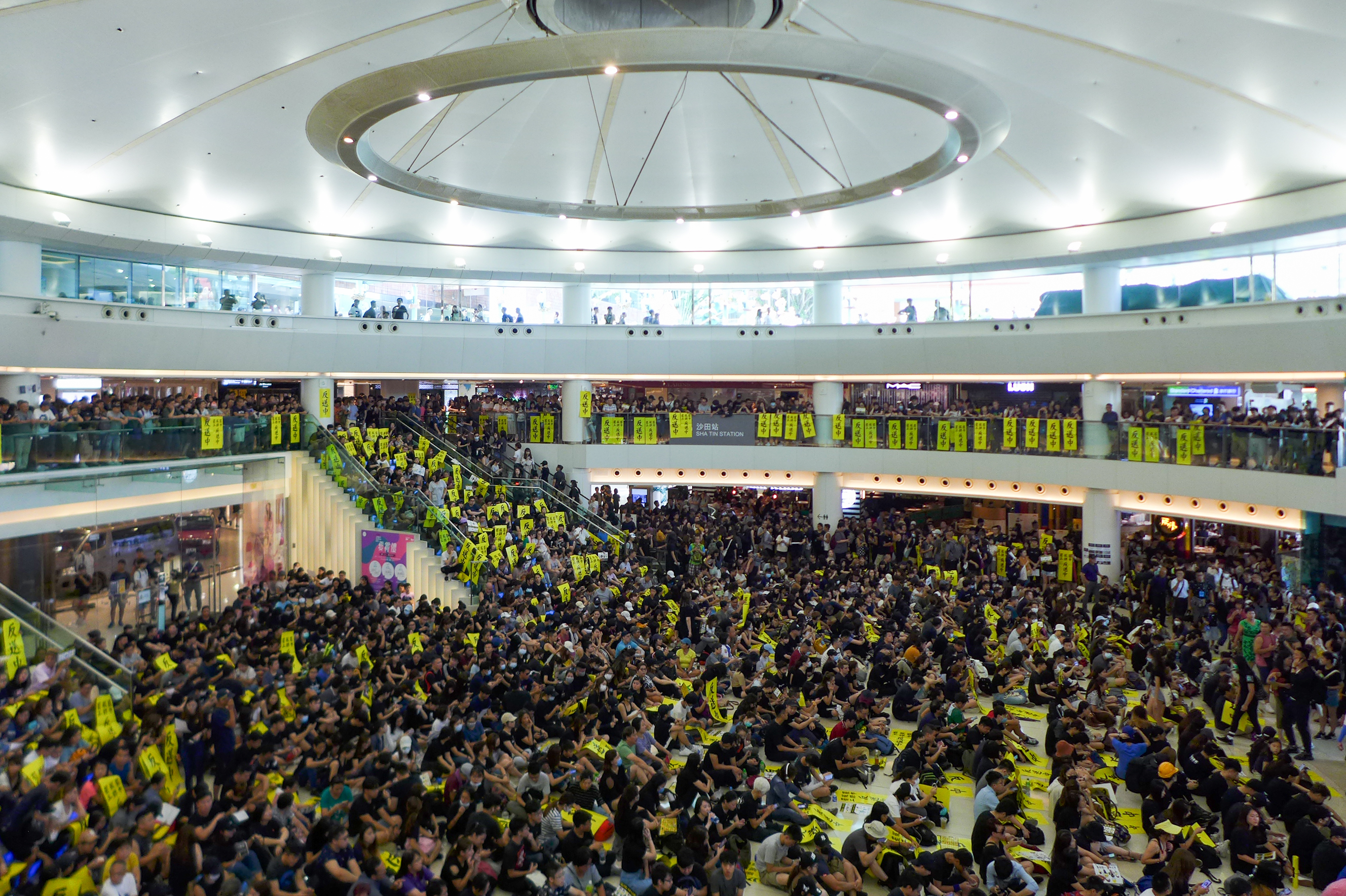
Protesters inside New Town Plaza, one of the seven locations for the main rallies on 5 August

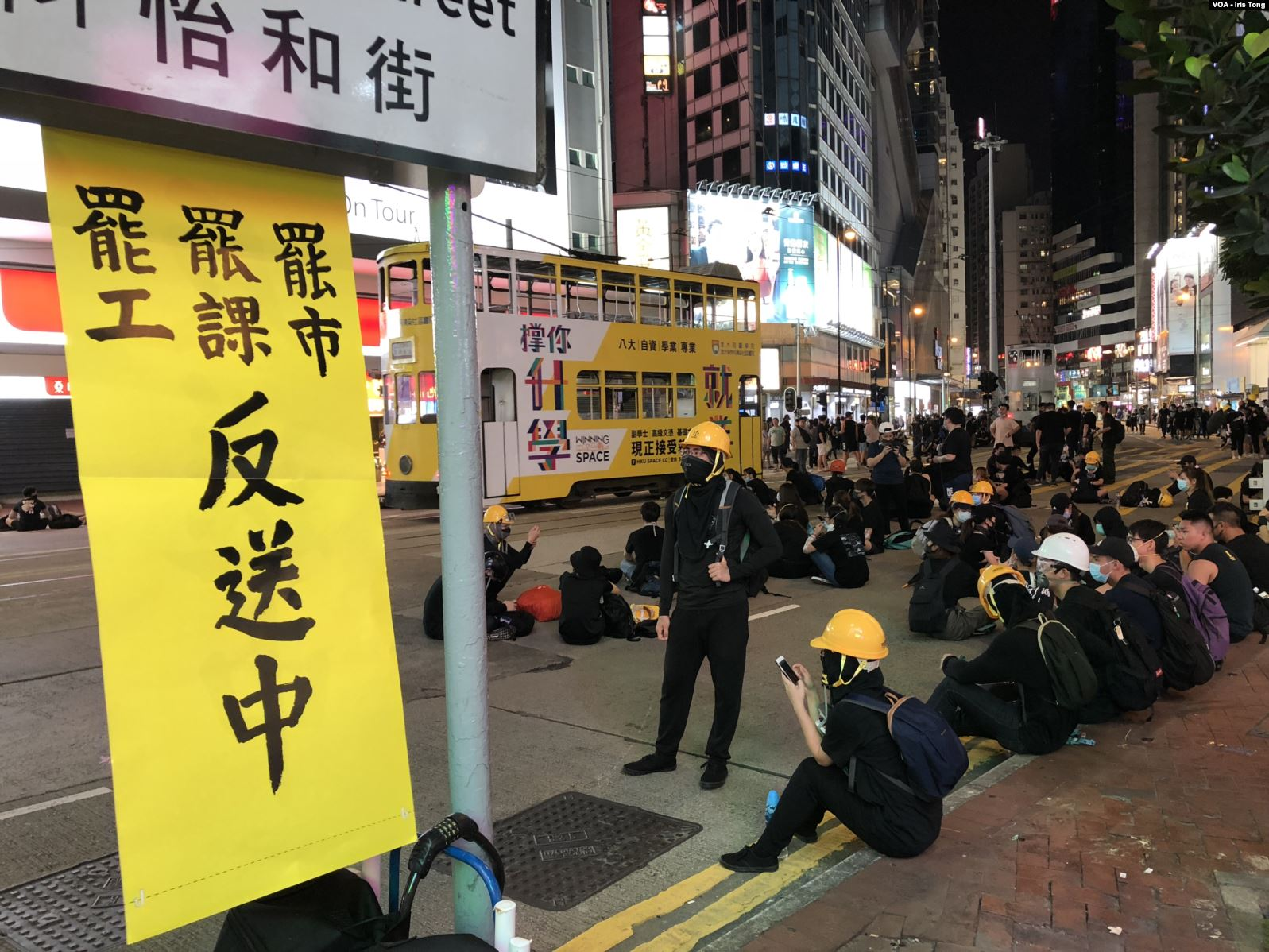
Strikers near the Sogo Department Store on Yee Wo Street. Closed in solidarity with the general strike action.

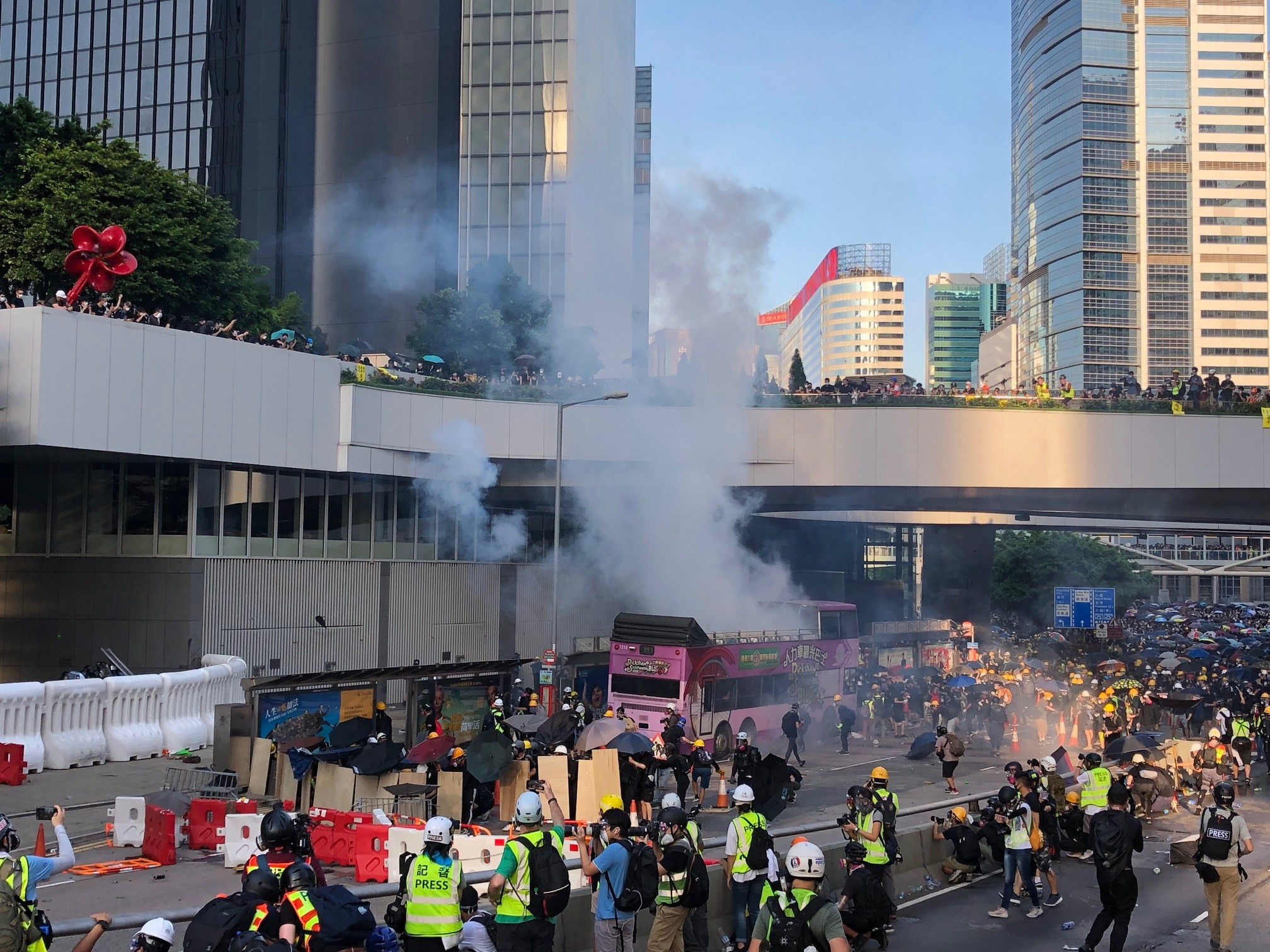
Police firing tear gas to disperse protesters near Central Government Complex

=== 5 August Tin Shui Wai police station protest ===
Following the arrest of a female protester who had her skirt and underwear torn by police officers during the struggle, eleven gender rights advocacy groups, including Gender and Sexual Justice in Action and the Chinese University's Sex and Gender Concern Group called for a rally outside Tin Shui Wai police station on 5 August to condemn the police over the suspect's mistreatment. Protesters threw eggs at the police while the police used tear gas to disperse the protesters. Legislator Helena Wong condemned the police over the treatment of the protester, calling the arrest "extremely disrespectful of women". Responding to the criticism, Yolanda Yu, senior superintendent said that the protester was "struggling vigorously" and therefore required male police officers to subdue her.

=== Solidarity protest of laser pointer arrest ===
==== 6 August ====
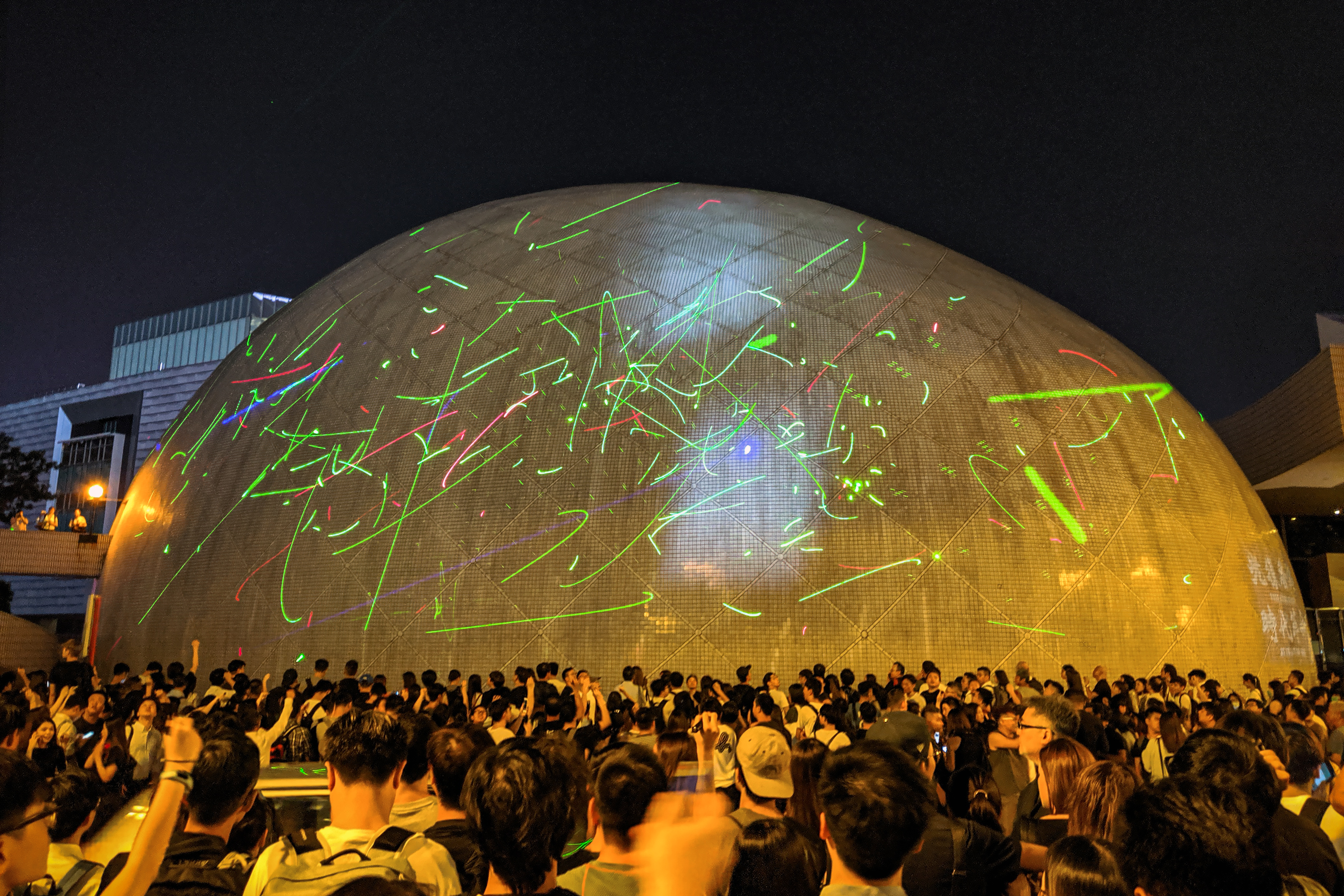
Hundreds gathered at Hong Kong Space Museum with their laser pointers in protest of selective legal enforcement and the arrest of Fong. 7 August 2019

In the afternoon of 6 August, Hong Kong Baptist University student union president Keith Fong was arrested in Apliu Street, Sham Shui Po district. Plainclothes officers said that they approached him as "he was acting suspiciously". Fong ran away but was caught. He was searched and 10 laser pointers, were found in a plastic bag. Fong stated that he purchased those laser pointers for stargazing, while passers-by supported him and chanted "release him". However, police officers arrested him for "possession of offensive weapon". Fong then complained of feeling unwell after he was choked by the officers and was taken to Caritas Medical Centre. His parents, along with Baptist University principal Roland Chin and lawyers, went to the hospital to visit him. Chin asked the police ensure students are treated fairly.

The student union and other citizens voiced their anger, condemning police for their abuse of power and described it as part of a broader campaign to intimidate and silence democracy activists. They questioned how laser pointers could become an "offensive weapon", a police representative responded in a press conference that several police officers in previous protests were injured due to laser beams that were pointed at them. At night, around 300 protesters gathered outside Sham Shui Po Police Station, chanting "triads" and "mafia cops." Police fired several tear gas to disperse the crowd, and arrested several protesters, including Sha Tin District Councilor Wong Hok-lai, for "unlawful assembly".

In February 2022, Fong was jailed after having been convicted of the charges of resisting police and perverting the course of justice. On 7 April 2022, he was sentenced to nine months in jail for the two offences.

==== 7 August ====
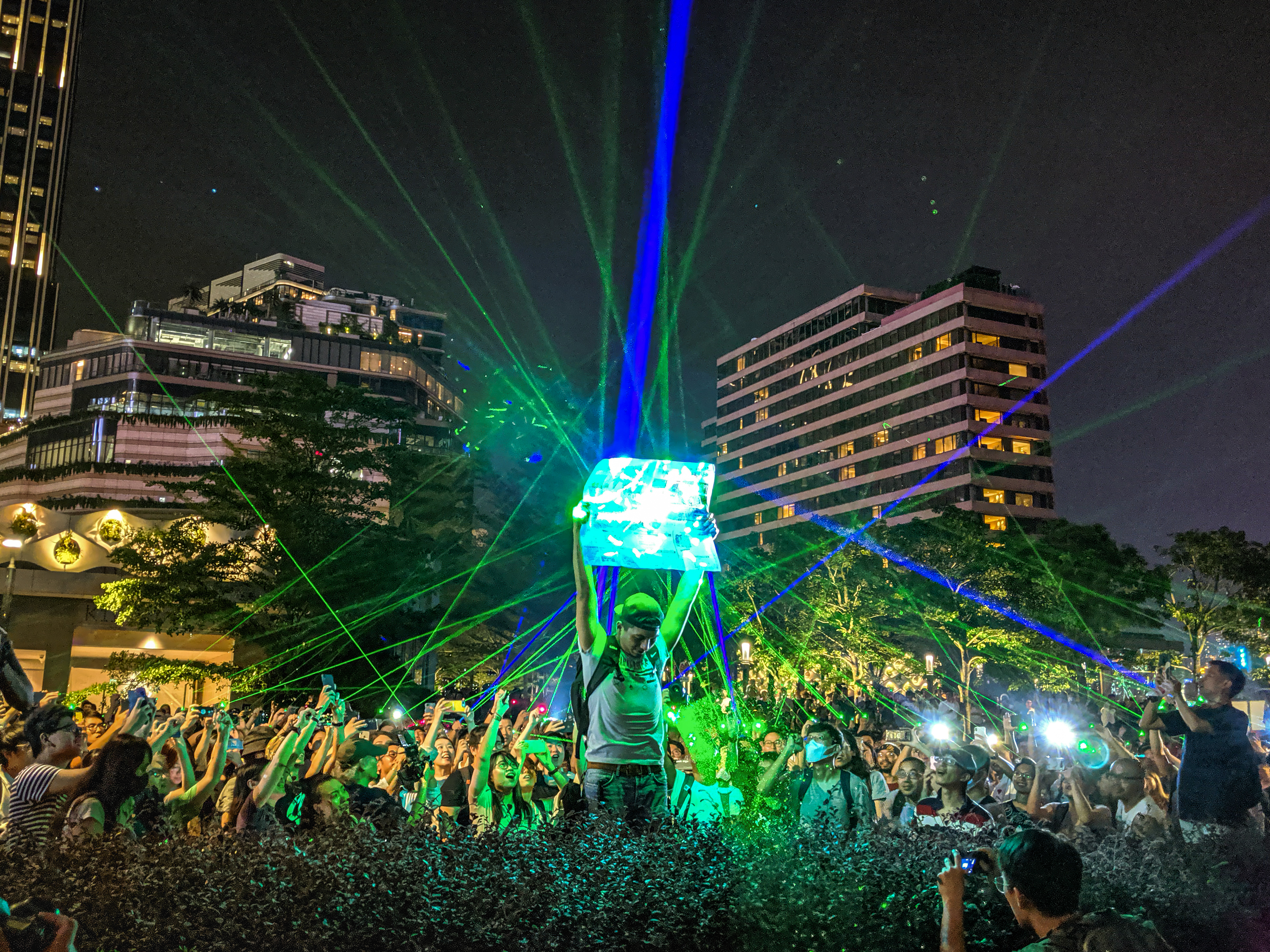
Protesters aiming laser pointers at a newspaper held up. 6 August 2019

On 7 August, a group of teachers and staff members from HKBU held a press conference supporting Fong and condemning police's excessive force. They stated that the arrest is "unexplainable" and question the selective police enforcement with "unreasonable definition of offensive weapon". They also said that the freedom granted by the Basic Law is shaken by the police's action.

In a police press conference in the afternoon, police representatives stated that the laser pointers he purchased were in fact "laser guns." They attempted to demonstrate the "laser gun" Fong purchased is able to burn a hole in a paper by pointing it to a black area of a newspaper and holding it steadily for 20 seconds at very short distance. According to Stand News, hundreds of shoppers have since been searching for laser pointers with many shops completely sold out.

At night, a group of protesters gathered at Hong Kong Space Museum and shined laser pointers on the wall of the museum, some chanted slogans like "laser pointer revolution" and joked "Is the building on fire yet?" They hoped to show support to Fong and voice condemnation of his arrest by police, and to show that laser pointers are neither offensive weapons nor effective enough to cause a fire. Protesters also sang the song "I Am Angry" from Cantopop band Beyond.

Fong was detained 48 hours without any criminal charges, and then released on 8 August.

=== 7 August lawyers' silent march ===
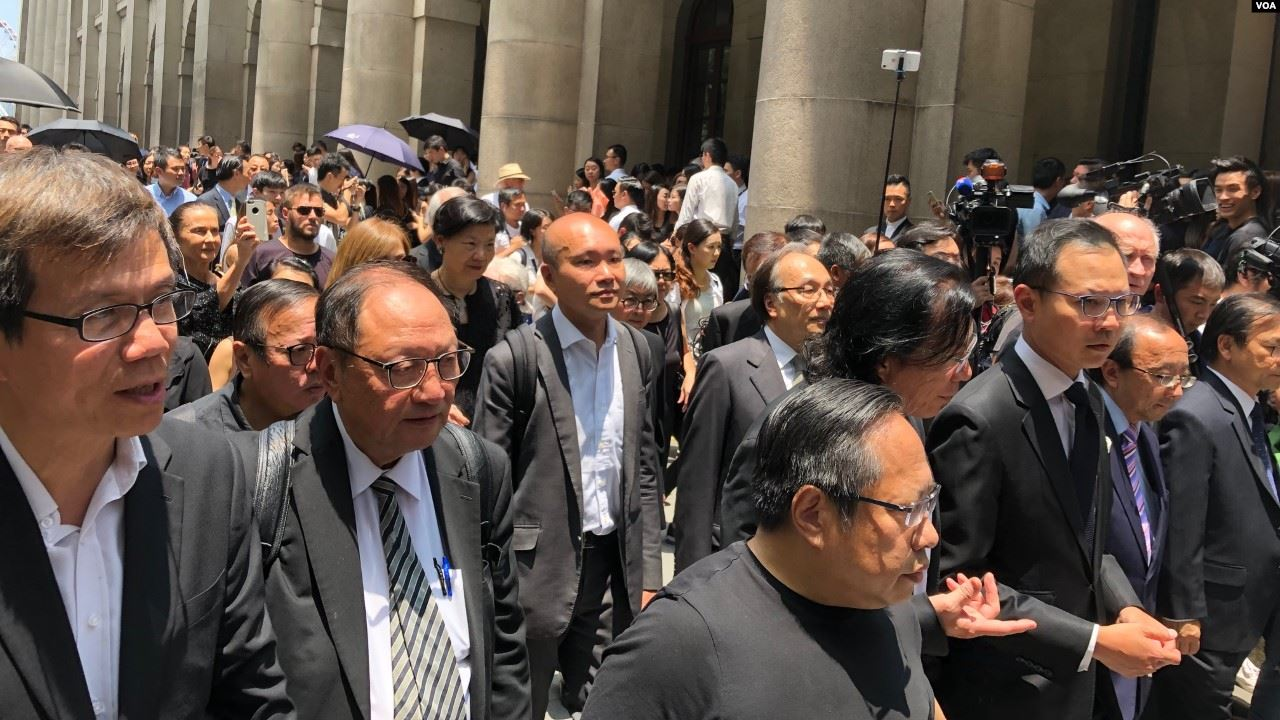
Thousands of lawyers marched in black against the selective prosecution by the Secretary for Justice on 7 August 2019.

A silent march by lawyers was staged on 7 August, the second one since 6 June. Around 3,000 legal sector professionals, in black, marched in silence from the Court of Final Appeal in Central to the Department of Justice's office at around 12:45 pm.

The group of protesters stated that Secretary for Justice Teresa Cheng frequently departed from usual procedures and well-established guidelines, and accused Cheng of bias in selecting prosecution cases. They quoted the difference in prosecuting the arrest of anti-extradition bill protesters as "rioting", versus prosecuting the arrests in the Yuen Long incident as "unlawful assembly." Furthermore, the rioting charges against the anti-extradition bill protesters were fast-tracked ahead of prosecution of the perpetrators of the Yuen Long violence, which occurred weeks before the protesters were arrested. Barrister Kevin Yam stated "All we want is justice, all we want is consistency, we don't want to see thugs get away while the best of our youth get prosecuted." They believed that this was the latest evidence of a decline of the rule of law.

Campaigners voiced concern over the use of excessive force and asked for an independent commission of inquiry. Teresa Cheng refused to meet the lawyers when they arrived at her office.

=== 8 August Catholics march ===
On Thursday night, around 1200 Catholics held a candlelight march through Central before finishing outside the Court of Final Appeal. The march organised by four Christian organisations, called for the government to heed to the protesters demands and called for both sides to exercise restraint, stop the violence and sit down to reach an agreement to help society move forward.

=== 9–11 August airport sit-ins ===
A second airport sit-in was held in the Hong Kong International Airport, which continued for three consecutive days. Protesters hoped to gain international support by having a "warm welcome." Unlike previous sit-ins, this demonstration was not approved by the Airport Authority. Extra security measures were put in place, with authorities preventing anyone without a boarding pass from entering the check-in area.

Thousands gathered in both Terminal 1 and 2 by 6 pm. Dressed in black, democracy activists handed out leaflets and pamphlets to tourists in several languages, including English, Ukrainian, Spanish, and German. A large banner reading "Liberate HK" was also unfurled from the second floor balcony. Demonstrators chanted and sang Do You Hear the People Sing?

Due to the protests, all flights in and out of the airport were cancelled since Monday (12 August). The protest was said to have disrupted as a result of the public assembly at the airport.

=== 9–14 August Paper-burning protests ===
A paper-burning protest was held in Wong Tai Sin and Sha Tin, in line with traditional Chinese customs during the Ghost Festival. Protesters burnt joss paper and threw hell money and attempted to light a bundle of incense sticks using laser pointers. They also threw hell money with Carrie Lam's face and a paper doll representing Junius Ho into a burning bin. 5 people were arrested by the police in Wong Tai Sin.

Another paper-burning protest was held in Sham Shui Po. Similarly, protesters burnt joss papers and images showing the faces of Carrie Lam and Police Commissioner Stephen Lo outside the Sham Shui Po police station. The protest was largely peaceful. The police then dispersed the protesters by shooting tear gas inside the police building complex and deploying riot police. Another similar protest was held in Tin Shui Wai, in which riot police arrested 5 protesters.

=== 10 August protests ===
Two generally peaceful protests occurred on Hong Kong Island. Early in the morning, hundreds of senior citizens marched from Wan Chai police HQ to Chief Executive's Office and handed out petition letters requesting the police to "lay down their offensive weapons". The protest was followed by a family rally named "Guard our children's future" in Edinburgh Place. Hundreds of parents showed up with their kids to demand the government to respond to the demands of the protesters. The parents then marched to the Government HQ and displayed banners drawn by children and balloons.

Less than a thousand protesters protested in Tai Po in the afternoon despite a police ban on the protest. Protesters gathered in Tai Po bus station and marched past the original destination, Kwong Fuk Road Football Ground. It was generally peaceful. Protesters chanted slogans including "liberate Hong Kong, revolution of our times" and "our five demands must all be fulfilled", and yelled "rubbish" and "triad" at the police. Around 6 pm, as the protesters were surrounded by the police, they moved to Tai Wai and New Town Plaza in Sha Tin and obstructed various locations, though protesters in Tai Wai dispersed after the police used tear gas.

The protesters then moved to different districts in Hong Kong, including Kowloon Bay, Kwun Tong, Tsuen Wan, and Wong Tai Sin, but they dispersed before the riot police began to advance. The Cross-Harbour Tunnel was blocked temporarily. In Tsim Sha Tsui, tension rose when a police officer arrested a bystander. Protesters besieged the police station, and the police used tear gas to disperse the protesters.

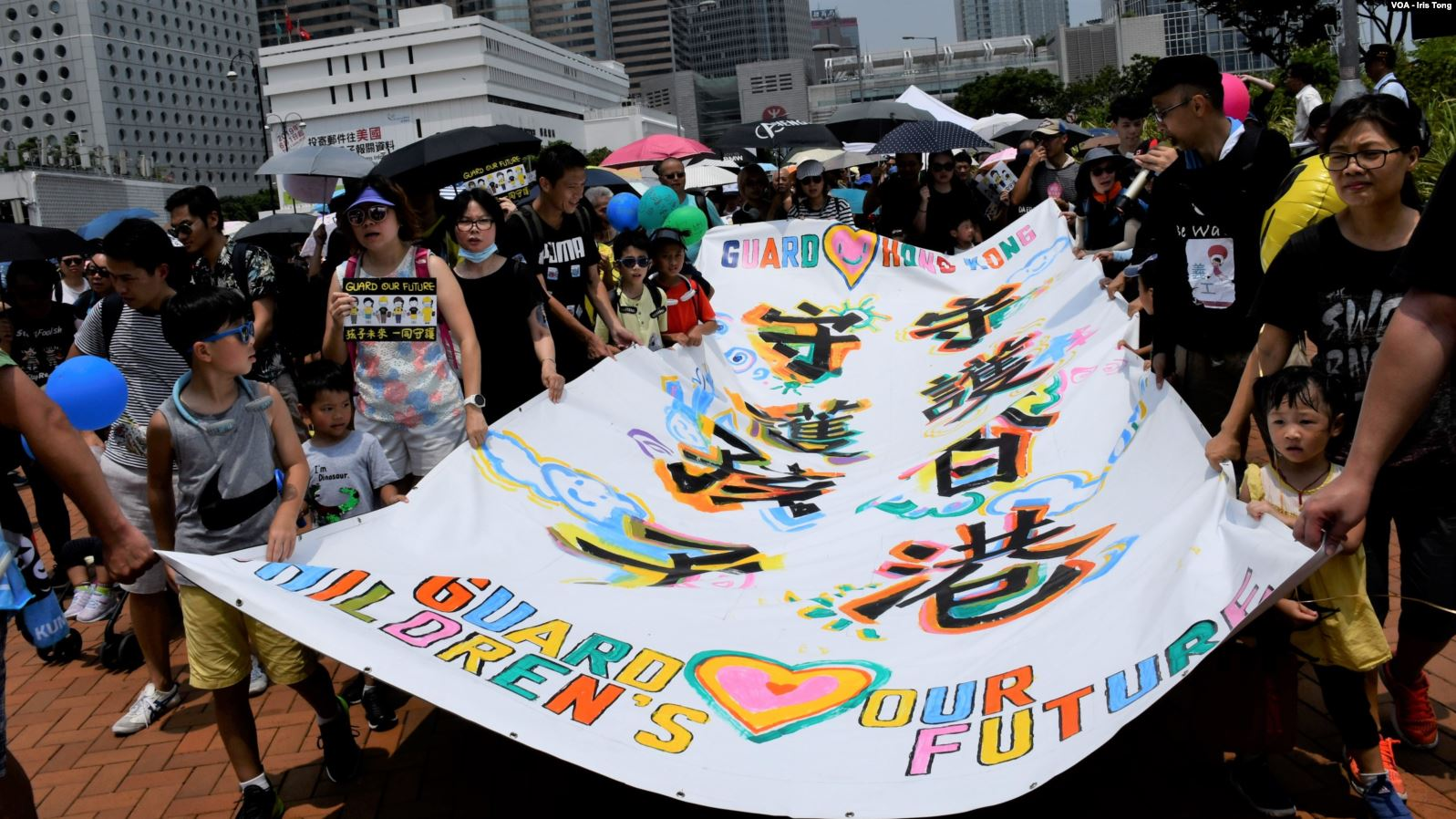
Family rally with parents and kids to urge government to respond to the demands

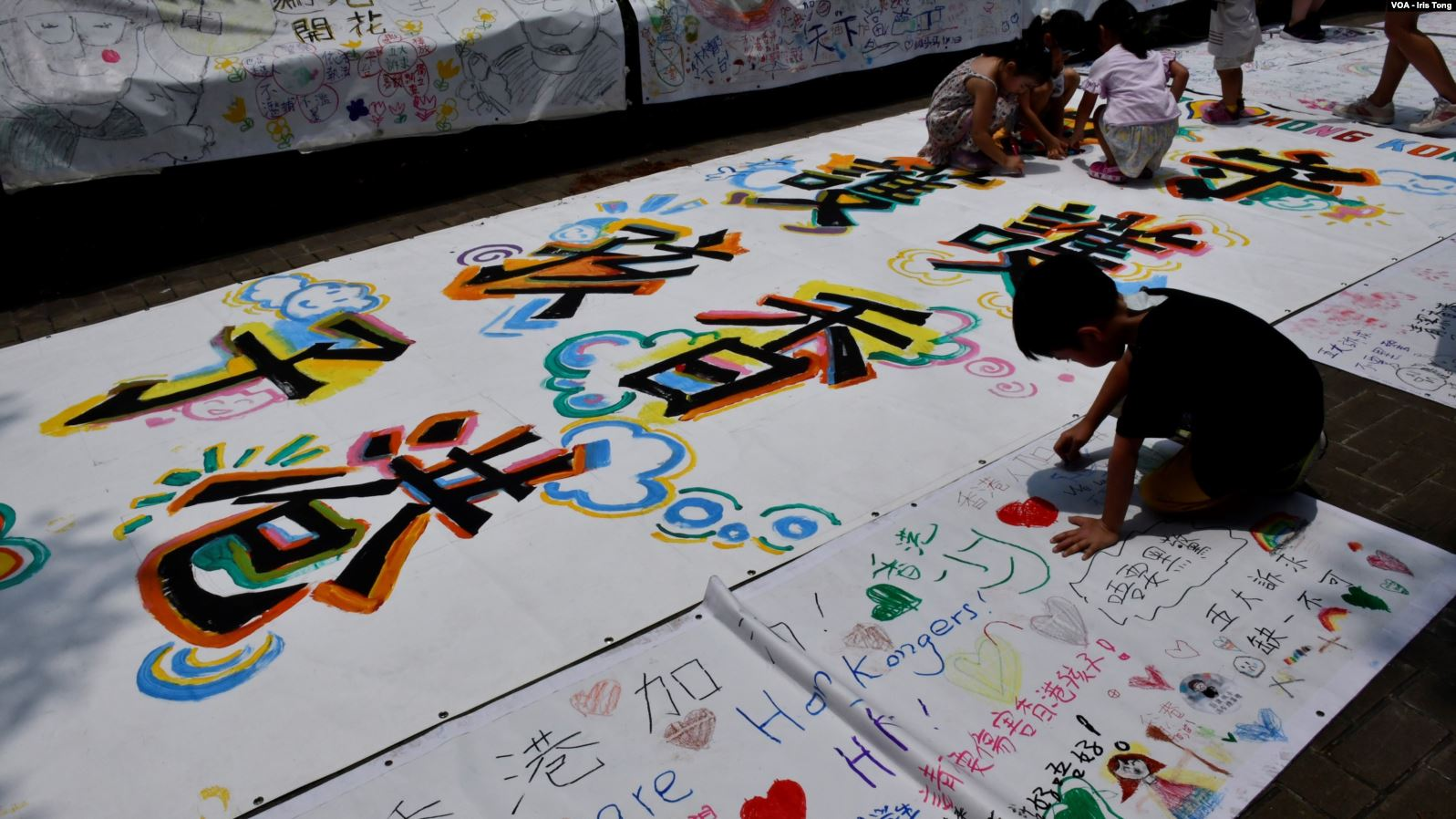
Kids drawing and writing their wishes and vision of the future of Hong Kong

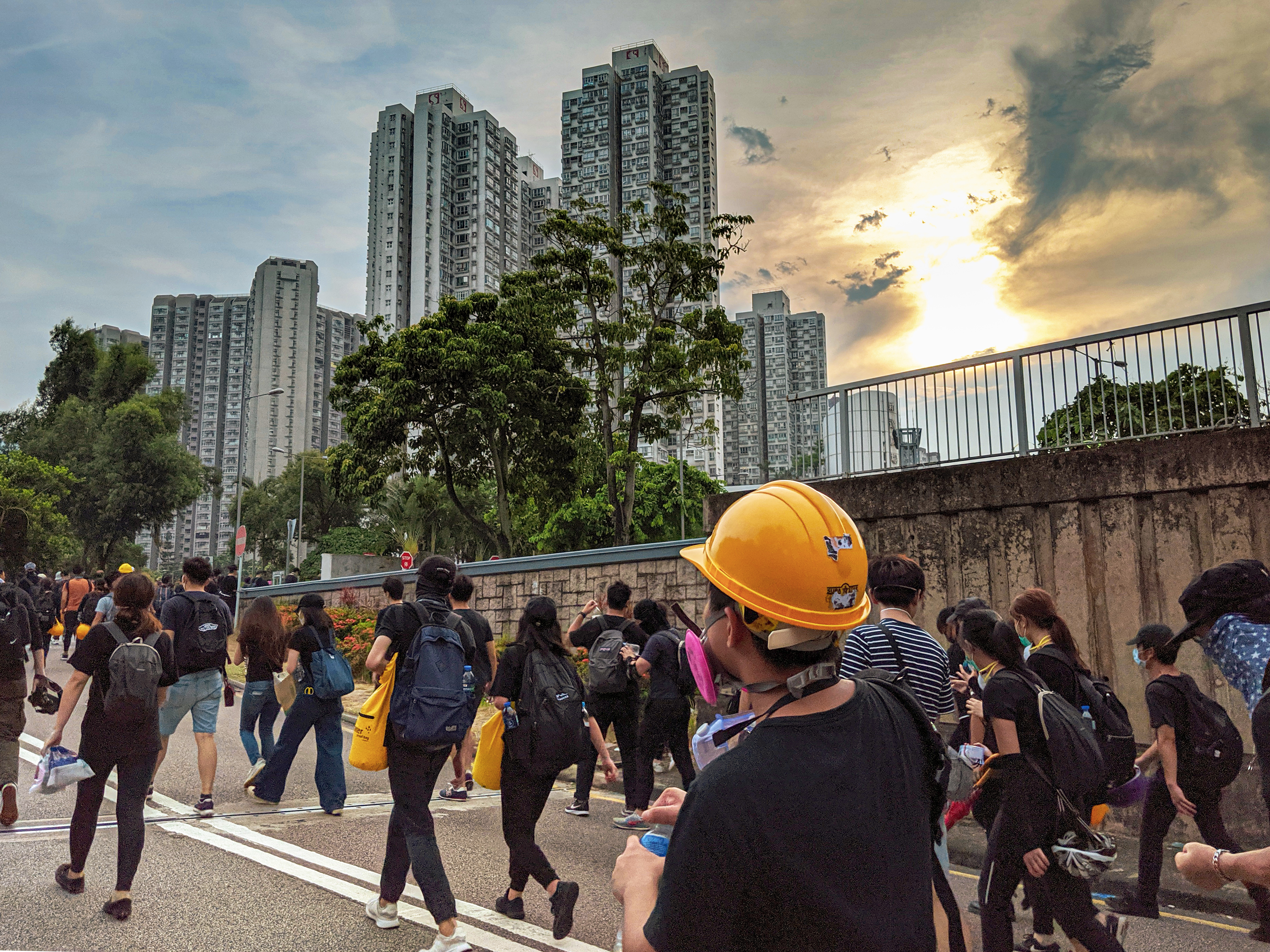
Protesters at Tai Po on 10 August 2019

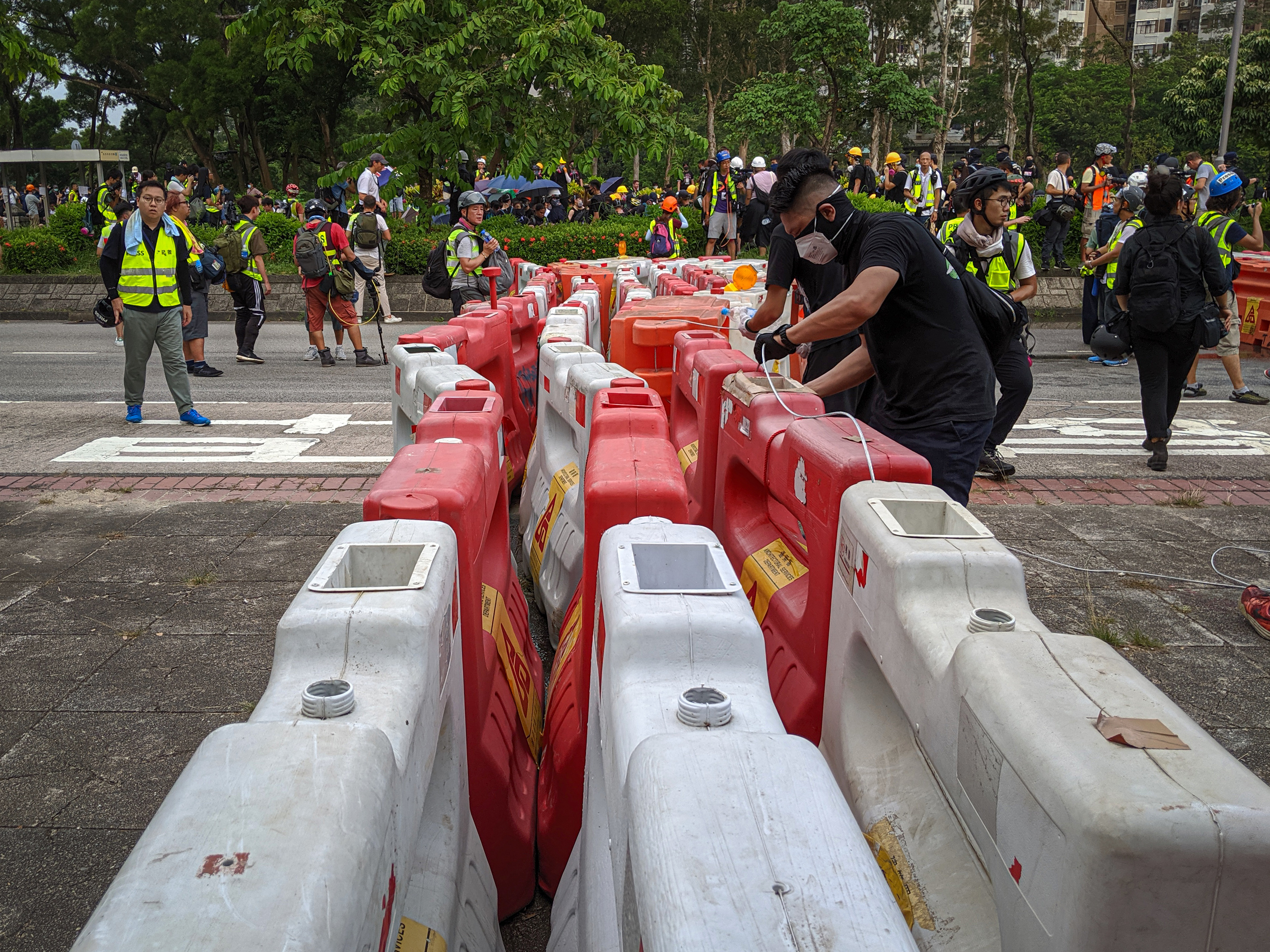
Stand-off between protesters and police in Tai Po

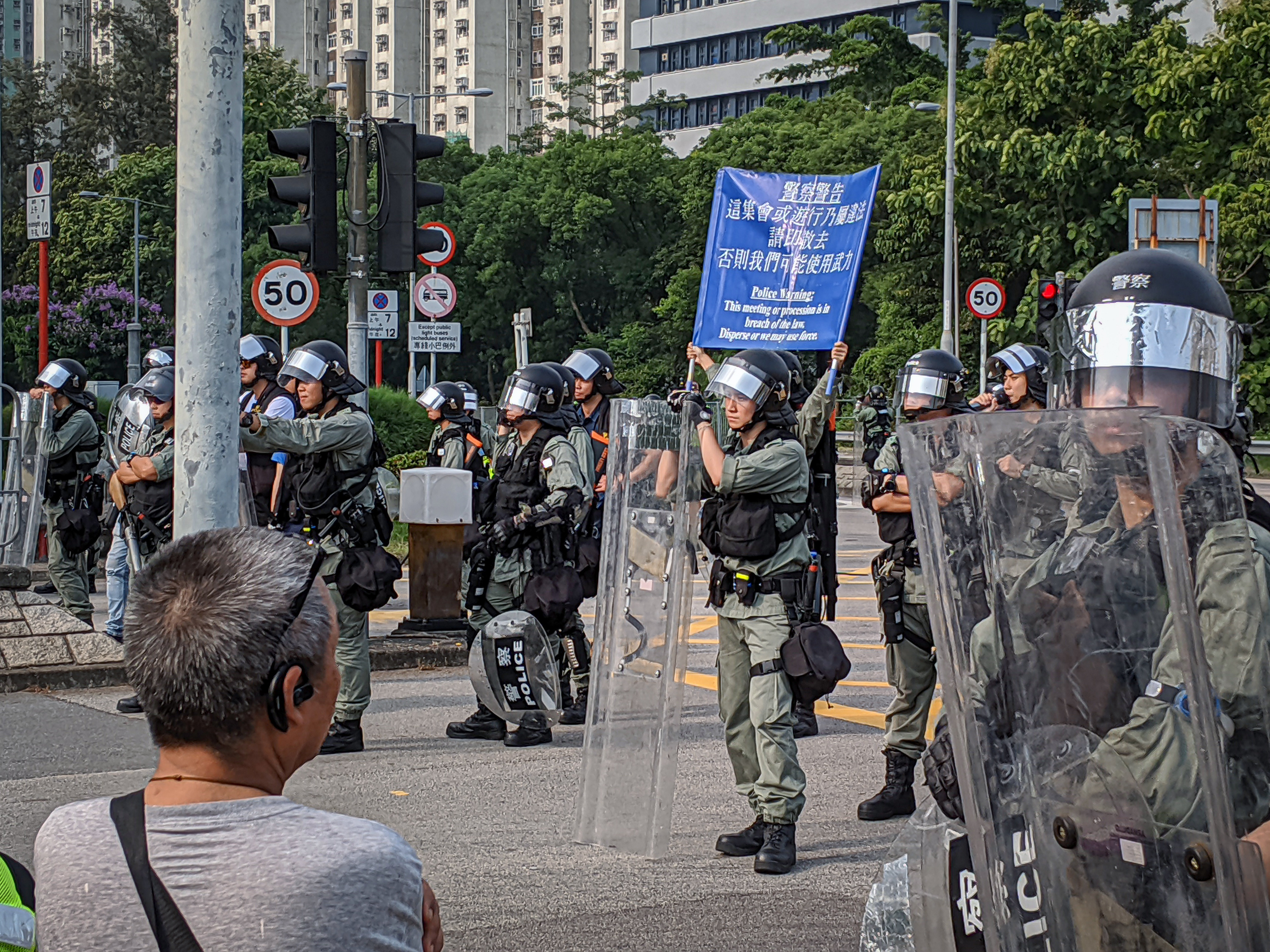
Riot police showing the "blue flag", warning protesters to disperse

=== 11 August protests ===
Despite a police ban on the protest, thousands marched in the Sham Shui Po region at 2 pm. Demonstrators marched from Maple Street Playground, set up roadblocks on Yam Chow Street, Cheung Sha Wan Road and besieged the Sham Shui Po Police Station. At 5 pm, the police dispersed protesters using tear gas, though some tear gas canisters landed on a pedestrian footbridge nearby, affecting both journalists and residents. Democracy activists moved on and besieged the police station in Tsim Sha Tsui. The police set up a defence line near the Lane Shopper's Boulevard district and fired bean bag rounds that ruptured the right eye of a female protester.

At 8 pm, protesters moved to Kwai Chung and besieged the Kwai Chung police station. Riot police dispersed the protesters. Demonstrators fled to Kwai Fong station and television footage showed police had fired tear gas and several rounds of rubber bullets from inside the station. Some protesters retreated to Mei Foo station and set up roadblocks on Kwai Chung Road, while another group besieged the police station again. Traces of irritant smoke were still found inside Kwai Fong station the following day. MTR Corporation, responding to the incident, said that it was "very regretful" and urged the police force to consider the safety of its staff and commuters during law enforcement actions.

An approved gathering was held in Victoria Park at 1 pm, though the police issued a Letter of Rejection to a protest that was to be held in the Eastern District. However, some protesters occupied major roads and intersections near the Sogo Hong Kong department store in Causeway Bay, while some moved along to Wan Chai, where a molotov cocktail was thrown during clashes with police. Red banners were seen posted throughout the North Point region, calling for Fujianese residents to defend their neighbourhood. Protesters had largely avoided marching to North Point, where democracy activists were previously assaulted by stick-wielding men, allegedly the local Fujianese residents, during the 5 August general strike. However, tensions rose in the region when locals dressed in red attacked two journalists and two other people.

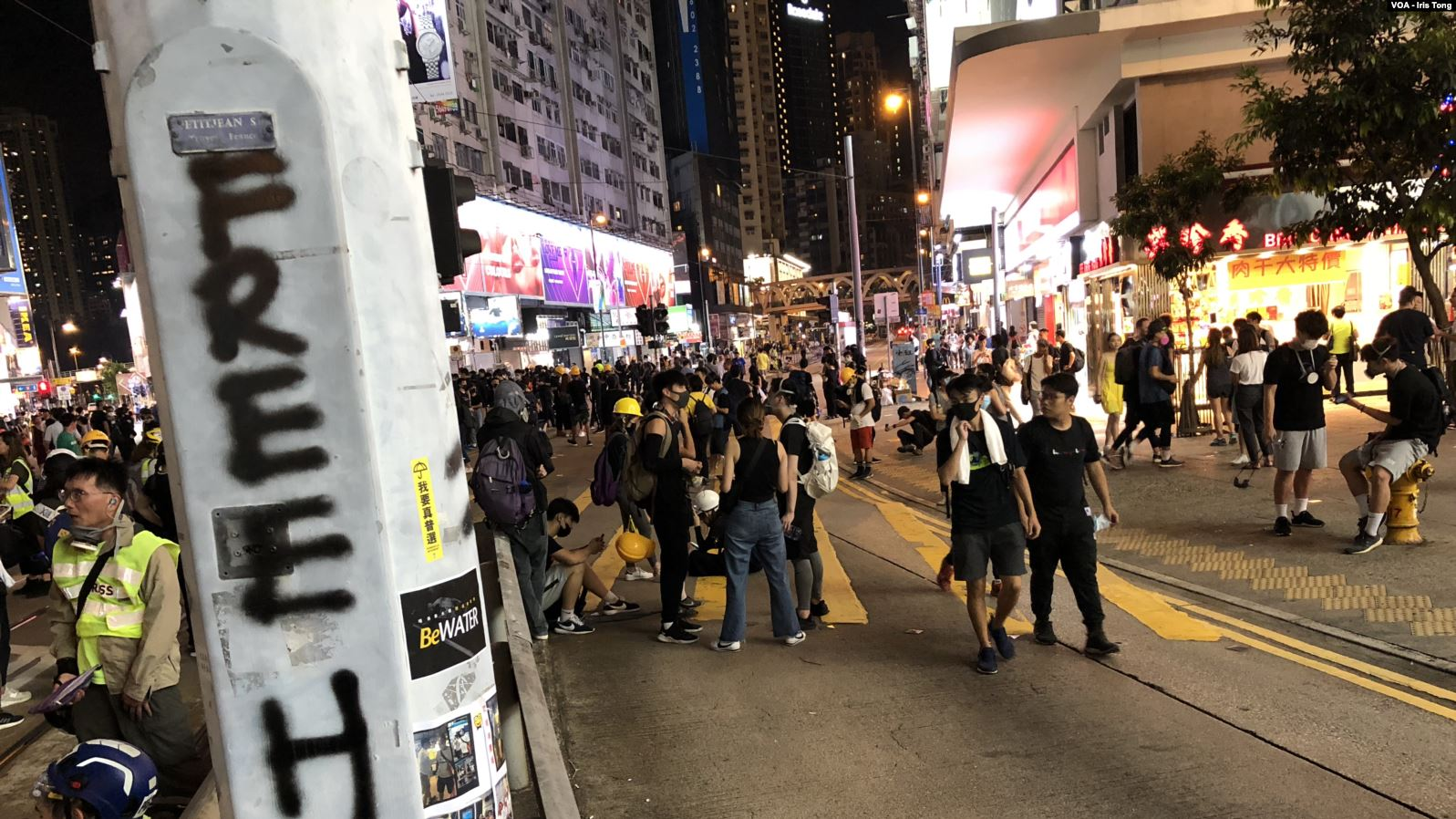
Protesters in Causeway Bay on 11 August 2019

In Causeway Bay, several people disguised as protesters were seen and caught on video tackling and arresting other protesters with the help of the police force at 10 pm. Around ten men dressed as protesters were seen and caught on video passing from under a staircase at a tramstop guarded by the police. This led to allegations that the police used undercover officers to infiltrate into the demonstration. When journalists approached one of these men, he refused to show his warrant card and told the press to "put down the camera." During a police press conference on 12 August, Deputy Police Commissioner Tang Ping-Keung defended the use of disguised "decoy officers" and stated: "I can say that during the time when our police officers were disguised ... they [did not] provoke anything. We won't ask them to stir up trouble." The violent arrest of a young man was filmed—he was pressed by more than one undercover police officer to the concrete road with so much force on his head that he lost at least one front tooth. The protester is not seen to have been resisting arrest and is heard apologising in the video, begging for mercy, and yet the police rubbed his face on the rough concrete road, leaving him with a blood-covered face. The arrest of another protester, during which a police officer was found putting a stick inside his backpack, was filmed. The police force was accused of planting evidence to frame the protester. The police defended the tactic, saying that the protester had held the stick before he was arrested.

Some protesters then moved to Quarry Bay station and a brief standoff with police followed. The Special Tactical Unit then chased democracy activists down an escalator in Tai Koo station and fired guns with pepper ball rounds, targeting protesters within a very close range and aiming directly at their heads. Police officers were also filmed by journalists and seen using their batons to beat fleeing protesters. The Civil Rights Observer organisation condemned police actions due excessive use of force and the possibility of causing a stampede.

Further conflicts occurred when protesters besieged the Sha Tin police station. Disgruntled by aggressive policing strategies and excessive use of force, residents in Sha Tin, Quarry Bay, Sai Wan Ho, Taikoo Shing, and Whampoa Garden gathered to drive off the police away from their neighbourhoods and homes. In Tsuen Wan, pedestrians were assaulted by men wearing white shirts.

By the end of the night, police had made dozens of arrests following the numerous flash-mob style police station blockades and in the many clashes during city-wide street protests that day. The escalation in arrests and new more assertive police tactics come within days of the Hong Kong Police Force bringing back from retirement Alan Lau Yip-shing, a former top officer who oversaw police strategy during the Umbrella Movement and Mong Kok Fishball Revolution. On 8 August, Lau was appointed deputy commissioner on special duty for a period of six months. Beginning on 9 August, Lau met with all top brass to discuss strategy and was charged with assisting the police commissioner to "enhance strategic command and oversee [large-scale] public order events."

The Hospital Authority reported that due to the events of 11 August, as many as 54 people were being treated for injuries, with two in serious condition.

=== 12–14 August police brutality protests ===
The events of 11 August had sparked controversy, as several protesters, including a woman who was allegedly shot in the eye by the police, were seriously injured by police actions that day. A demonstration against police brutality was organised in response and held at the Hong Kong International Airport on 12 August. Sit-ins and roving protests began by 1 pm, as thousands of people turned up to speak out about police violence. Many held signs and chanted slogans such as "police go back to China" and "evil police eye for an eye", while some protesters organised mobile "Lennon Wall" on their bodies during the protests. Due to the large amount of protesters going to the airport, the traffic to the airport was congested. At around 3 pm, the thousands of protesters had exceeded the capacity of the two main arrival halls, and the overflow of incoming protesters then congregated in the departure halls. As many as 5,000 democracy activists may have been involved in the demonstrations. By 4 pm, the Airport Authority announced that all other flights had been cancelled for the rest of the day, except for departure flights that had completed the check-in process, and the arrival flights already heading to Hong Kong. At the same time, there were rumours and news about the arrival of riot police and the clearance of the airport. Most protesters then left, while some stayed with the remaining travellers who were stuck in the airport.

On 13 August, protesters demonstrated again at Hong Kong International Airport as the airport reopened following the airport's closure from the day prior. Protesters had used luggage trolleys as physical defence for themselves during Tuesday's protest at the airport. Passengers struggled to get through the airport as protesters had blocked the path to the gating area. As a result of the continued protests, at 4:30 pm, Hong Kong airport officials announced that check-ins were suspended for the remainder of the day at least. Members of British pop rock band The Vamps became stranded at the airport due to the protests. In an interview from the airport with Good Morning Britain on 13 August, the band publicly expressed their support for the protesters.

On the same day, protesters cornered a man suspected of being a mainland security officer. The man was severely beaten, and was taken away a few hours later by the police. Shortly afterward, another man with a press vest was questioned by protesters about whether he was truly a reporter. He was seen taking photos of protesters' faces and told protesters he is actually a "traveller". Protesters gathered around him and requested him to show his press passes, though he refused. Protesters then discovered a blue T-shirt with the words "I Love Hong Kong Police", which was identical to the shirts attackers wore in an attack before. His Chinese passport, identity card, and diary were also taken. Protesters tied him up and he was then taken away by first-aiders. He was later identified as Fu Guohao, a Global Times journalist. The violence against Fu Guohao has been condemned by the Program Director of Committee to Protect Journalists, Carlos Martinez de la Serna, who stated that "Journalists from all outlets must be allowed to cover the demonstrations in Hong Kong without having to fear for their safety." HKJA also condemned the violence and urged reporters from Chinese media outlets to display their credentials clearly to avoid similar incidents from happening again. Protesters offered apologies in the morning of 14 August.

On 14 August, the court issued an interim injunction to restrict the protests inside the airport. Some continued to protest but they stayed inside the areas allowed by the Airport Authority.

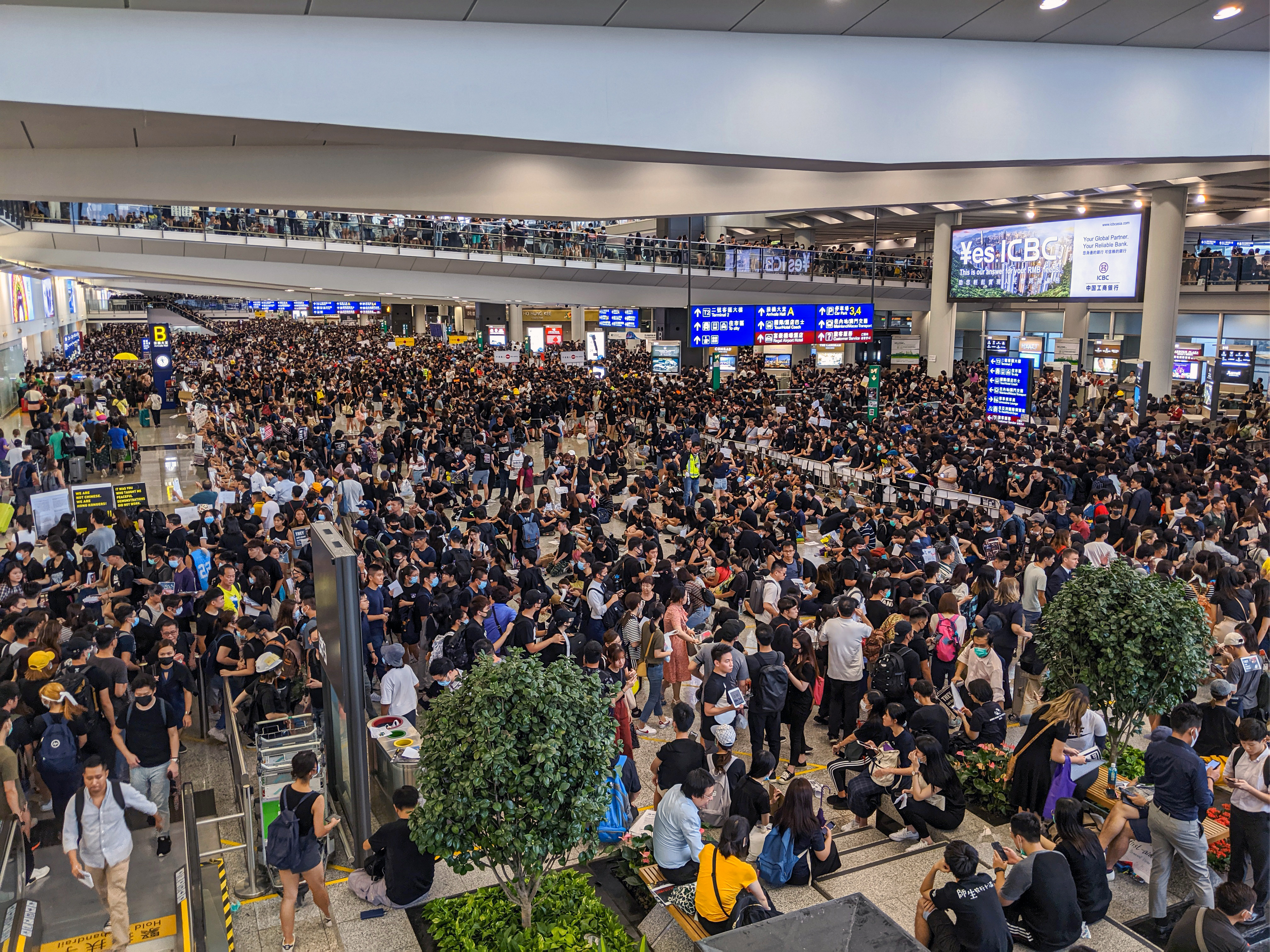
Protesters in the arrival halls in the Hong Kong International Airport

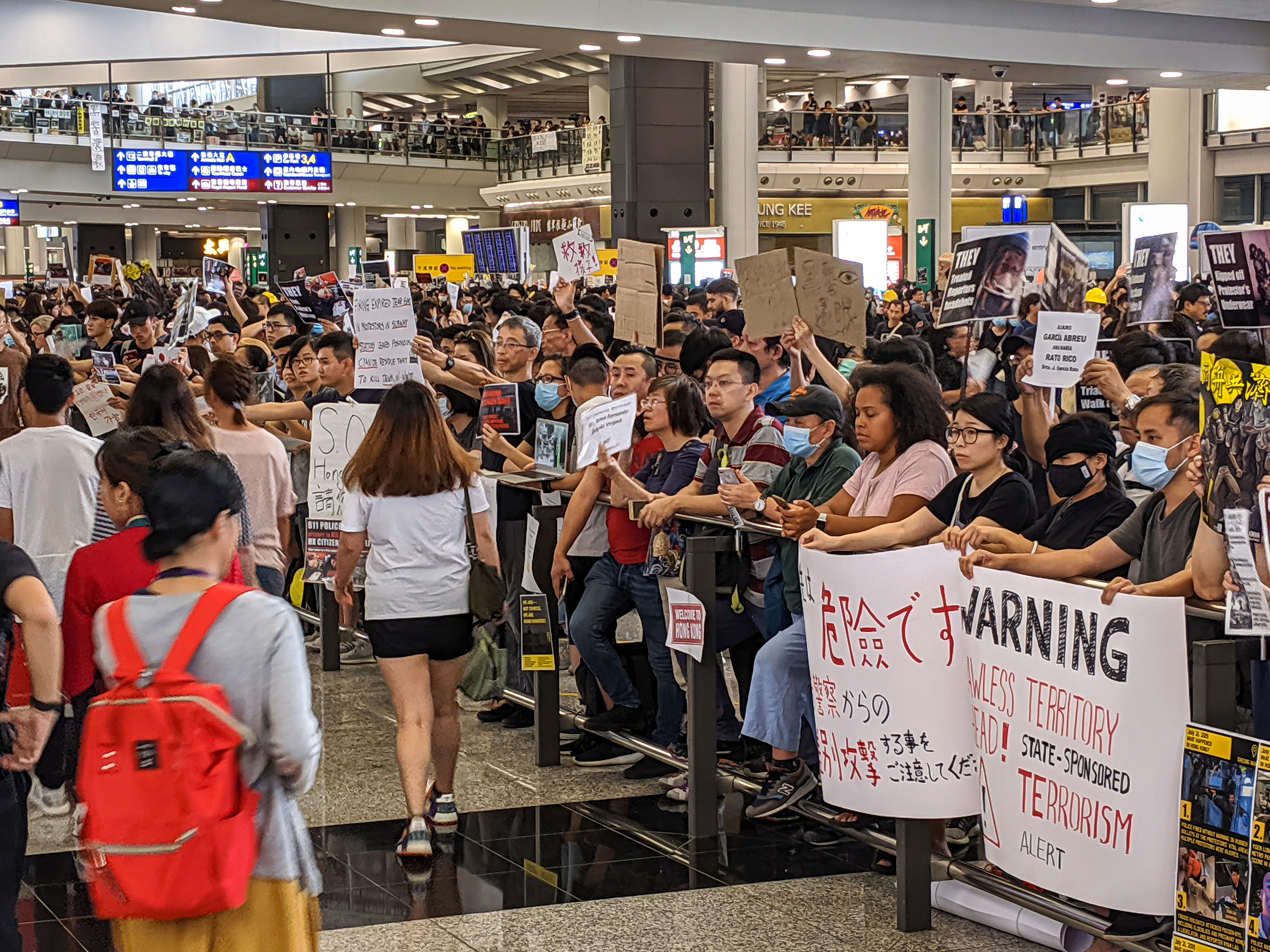
Protesters handing leaflets and showing signs to tourists arriving in Hong Kong

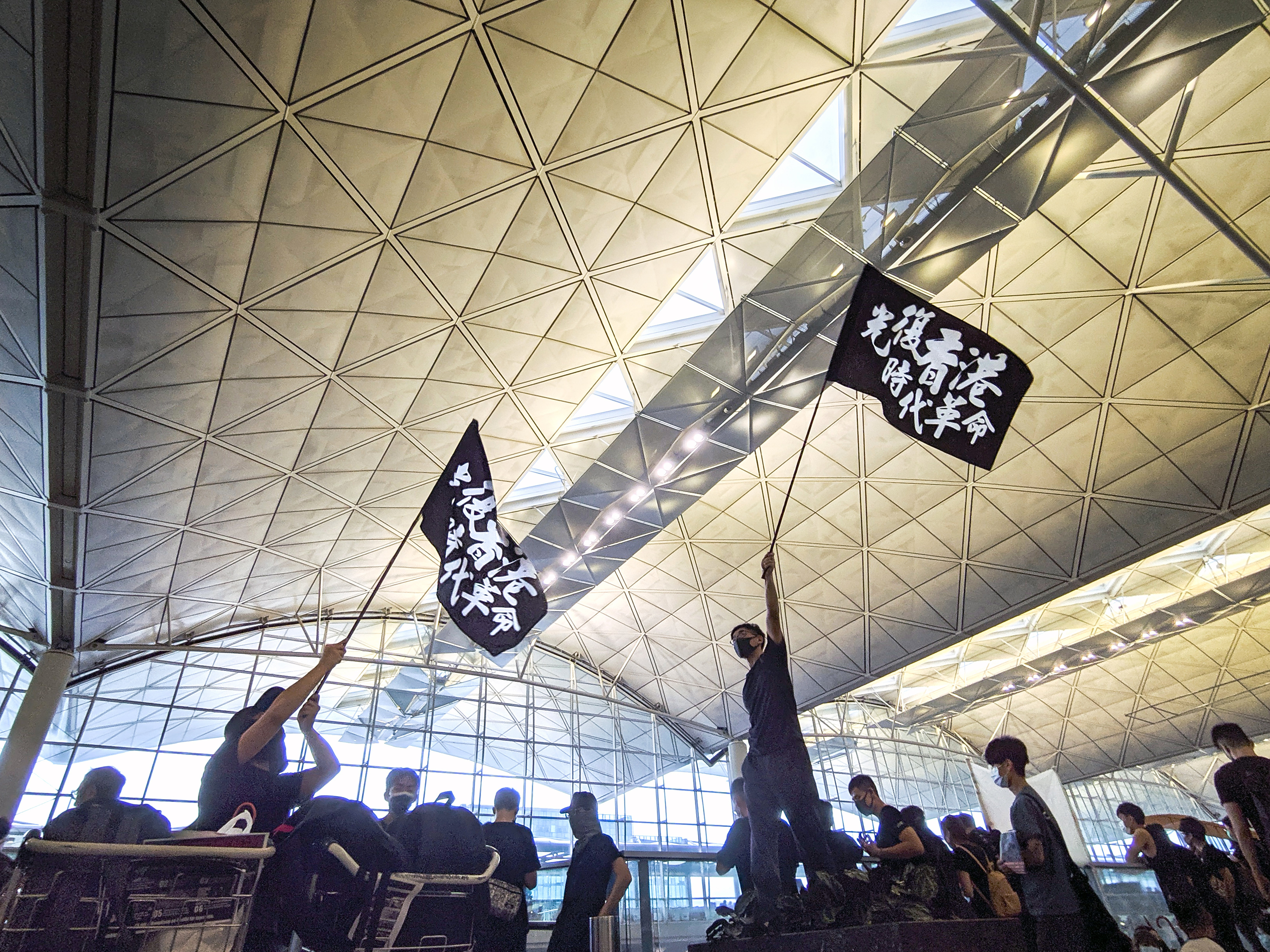
Protesters waving "Liberate Hong Kong, revolution of our times" flag

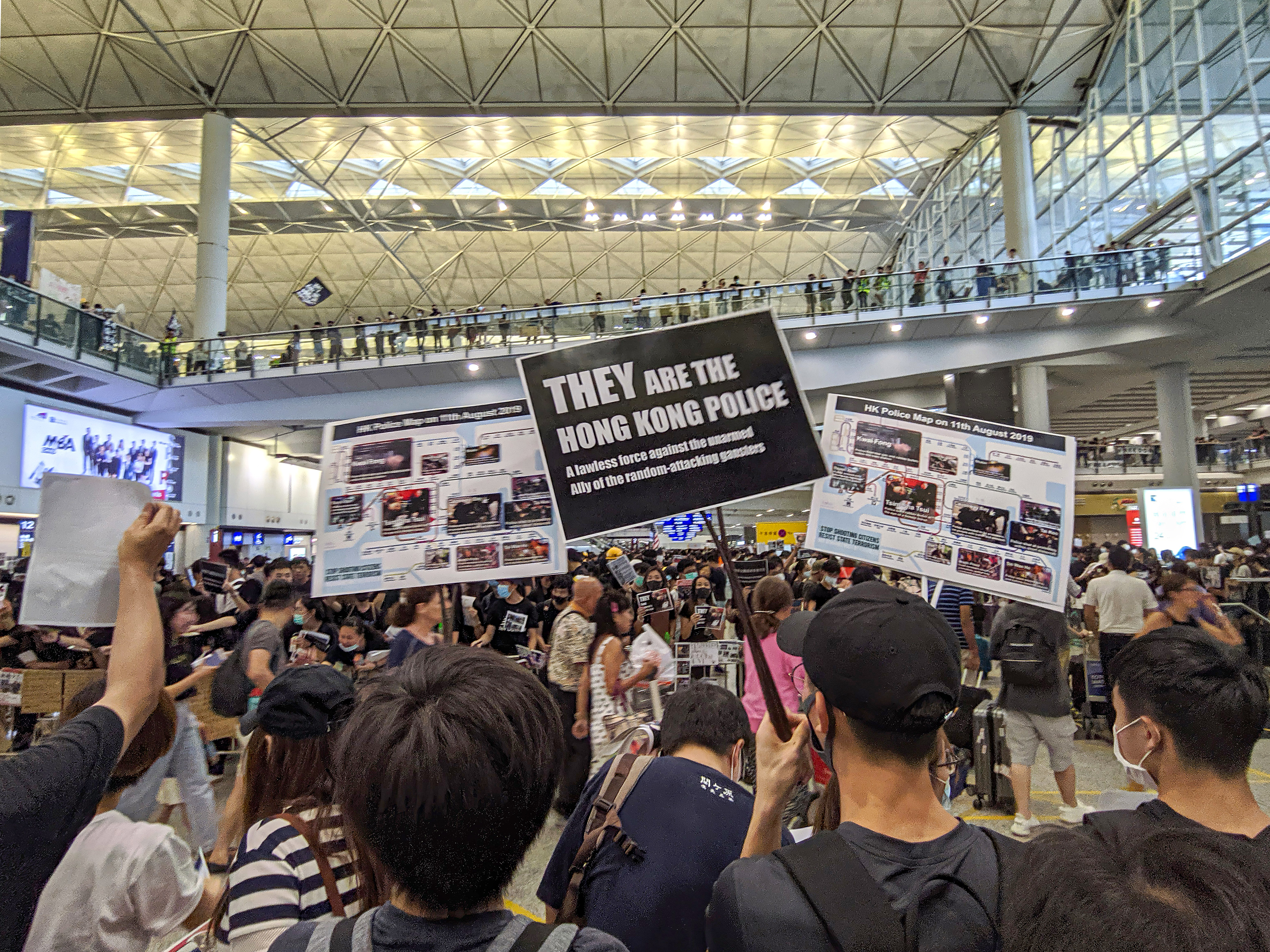
Signs held by protesters

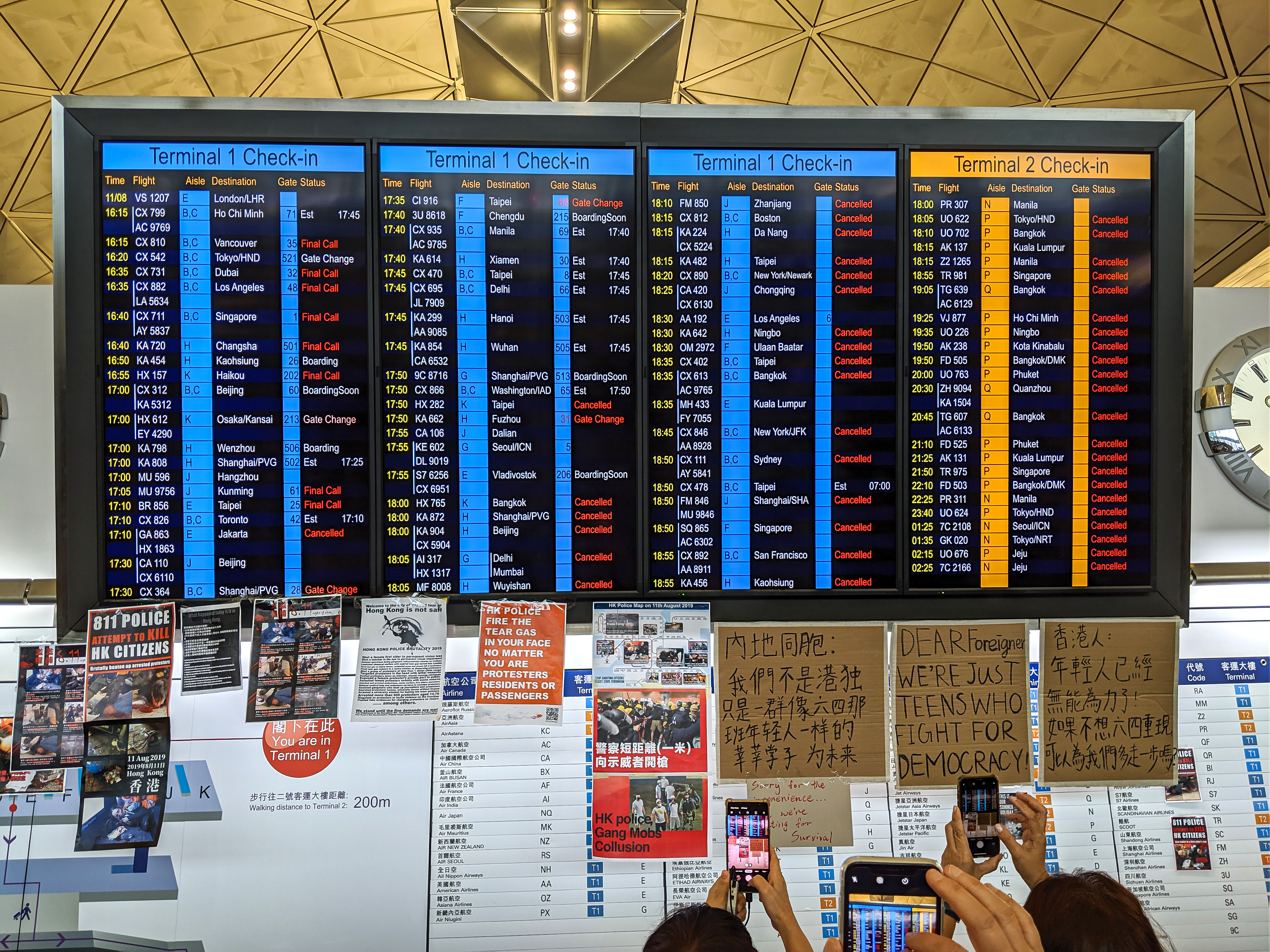
Flights cancelled due to protest events

=== 12–14 August hospital staff protests ===
On 12 August, about 100 medical professionals at the Pamela Youde Nethersole Eastern Hospital in Chai Wan demonstrated against abuses of power by police during the recent protests, in which one woman was struck in the eye by an allegedly police projectile and seriously wounded. Medical staff held a banner that read "Hong Kong police attempt to murder Hong Kong citizens." A similar protest by medical staff was held that same day at Princess Margaret Hospital in Lai Chi Kok.

Another demonstration was held on 13 August, by health care workers in at least 7 public hospitals, including Prince of Wales Hospital, Queen Elizabeth Hospital, Queen Mary Hospital, and Tuen Mun Hospital. Demonstrators wore black in solidarity with the on-going democracy movement. Demonstrators covered their right eyes with gauze to support the female protester whose right eye was shot by the police. A doctor at the Tuen Mun Hospital protest stated that these solidarity rallies were a "direct response" to the shooting of that woman on 11 August. These protests were held during lunch breaks and hospital operations were not affected.

On 14 August, hospital staffs from Ruttonjee Hospital and Tang Shiu Kin Hospital joined the protest. A total of 15 public hospitals have held protests since the 11 August incident. On the same day, people wearing red T-shirts harassed the medical staffs at Princess Margaret Hospital, where the injured journalist Fu Guohao was hospitalised.

Also on 12 August, a group of front-line medical workers called for an indefinite strike, requesting that the government respond to the five demands of the protest movement. A total of 15 public hospitals have held protests since the 11 August incident.

=== 16 August rally ===
The Hong Kong Higher Institutions International Affairs Delegation, an association composed of students from the 12 local universities and colleges, held a rally named "Stand with Hong Kong – Power to the People" in Charter Garden. Protesters asked the US and the UK to provide assistance and urged both governments to enact sanction on the officials responsible for causing the protests. Exiled activists, including Ray Wong Toi-yeung and Brian Leung Kai-ping recorded video messages for the crowds. Organisers claimed that 60,000 people attended, though the police put the figure at 7,100.

=== 17 August teachers march ===
The Hong Kong Professional Teachers' Union organised a march named "Safeguard the next generation, let our conscience speak" to support Hong Kong students and show solidarity to the arrestees. Despite heavy rain, thousands of teacher wearing black marched from Charter Garden to Government House. HKPTU claimed that 22,000 people attended, while the police put the figure at 8,300.

=== 17 August Reclaim To Kwa Wan-Hung Hom ===
The protest was initially set to be held on 27 July, though it was later moved to 17 August to prevent clashing with "Reclaim Yuen Long". The police initially banned the protest, though they approved when it adopted a shorter route. Protesters marched from Hoi Sham Park to Whampoa station to call the government to solve the community issues brought by an excessive number of mainland tourists in the region and condemn police brutality. The branch offices of pro-Beijing parties DAB and HKFTU were vandalised, and protesters hurled eggs at the offices. Protesters placed pineapples, a slang for homemade explosives, outside HKFTU's office, reflecting their role during the Hong Kong 1967 leftist riots. Some protesters marched back to To Kwa Wan and Kowloon City and occupied sections of Ma Tau Wai Road and To Kwa Wan Road. Some protesters also moved to Mong Kok, Jordan and Yau Ma Tei and besieged the Mong Kok police station. Overall, approximately 20,000 joined the rally.

=== 18 August rally ===
The Civil Human Rights Front initially applied to hold a march, though only a rally in Victoria Park was approved. The march was called to condemn police brutality and reiterate the five core demands after the 11 August incident. Due to the sheer number of people showing up, MTR's trains skipped Causeway Bay station, Tin Hau station and Fortress Hill station. A massive amount of protesters waited on Hennessy Road, Gloucester Road, and Kings Road for hours to get into the park. At 3:29 pm, former Legislative Councilors Leung Kwok-hung and Lee Cheuk-yan led the protesters towards Charter Garden, Central, the march's original end point, along Hennessy Road in defiance of the police's ban. Protesters soon spilled over onto Yee Wo Street, Pennington Street, Jardine's Bazaar and Lockhart Road. Kowloon Motor Bus was forced to cancel all routes crossing the Cross-Harbour Tunnel. Near the end of the rally, protesters briefly occupied sections of Harcourt Road outside the Government Headquarters, though some protesters called the people who stayed to go home to ensure that the protest can end peacefully.

According to CHRF, 1.7 million protesters attended the rally and an additional estimated 300,000 protesters marched between Central and Causeway Bay, but could not enter the park due to overcrowding. The police put the figure at 128,000 at peak of those only in Victoria Park football areas. According to Bonnie Leung, CHRF's vice convenor, the high turnout rate had "revitalized" the campaign against the extradition law, and that should Carrie Lam not respond to protesters' demands, her administration will face tougher and more radical measures from protesters. The association also intended to apply for a judicial review questioning the police ban, which it regarded as unjustifiable. The government recognised that the protest was largely peaceful, though it criticised the marchers for inconveniencing the public as they occupied major roads on Hong Kong Island during the march.

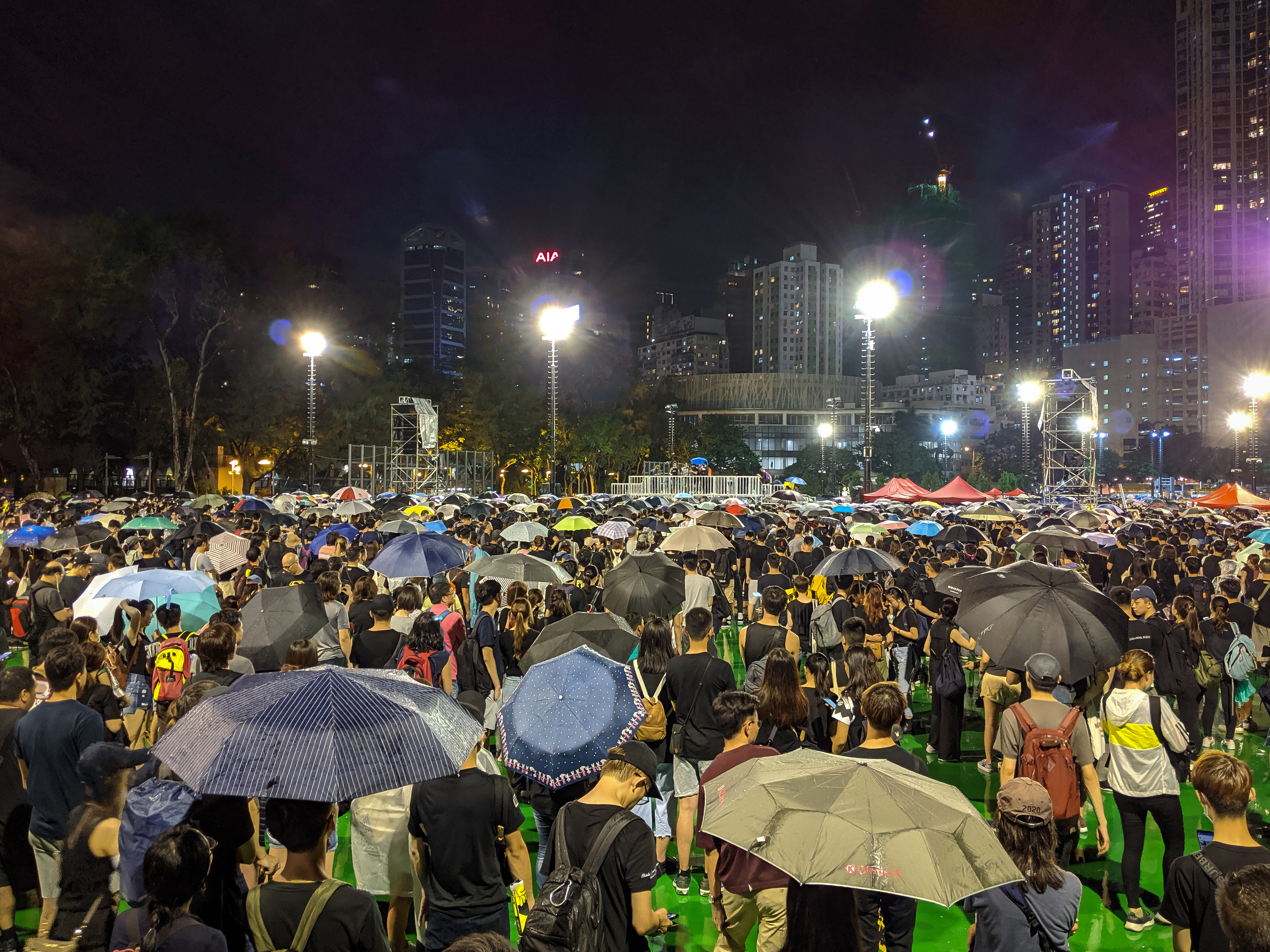
Protesters inside Victoria Park for the rally by Civil Human Rights Front

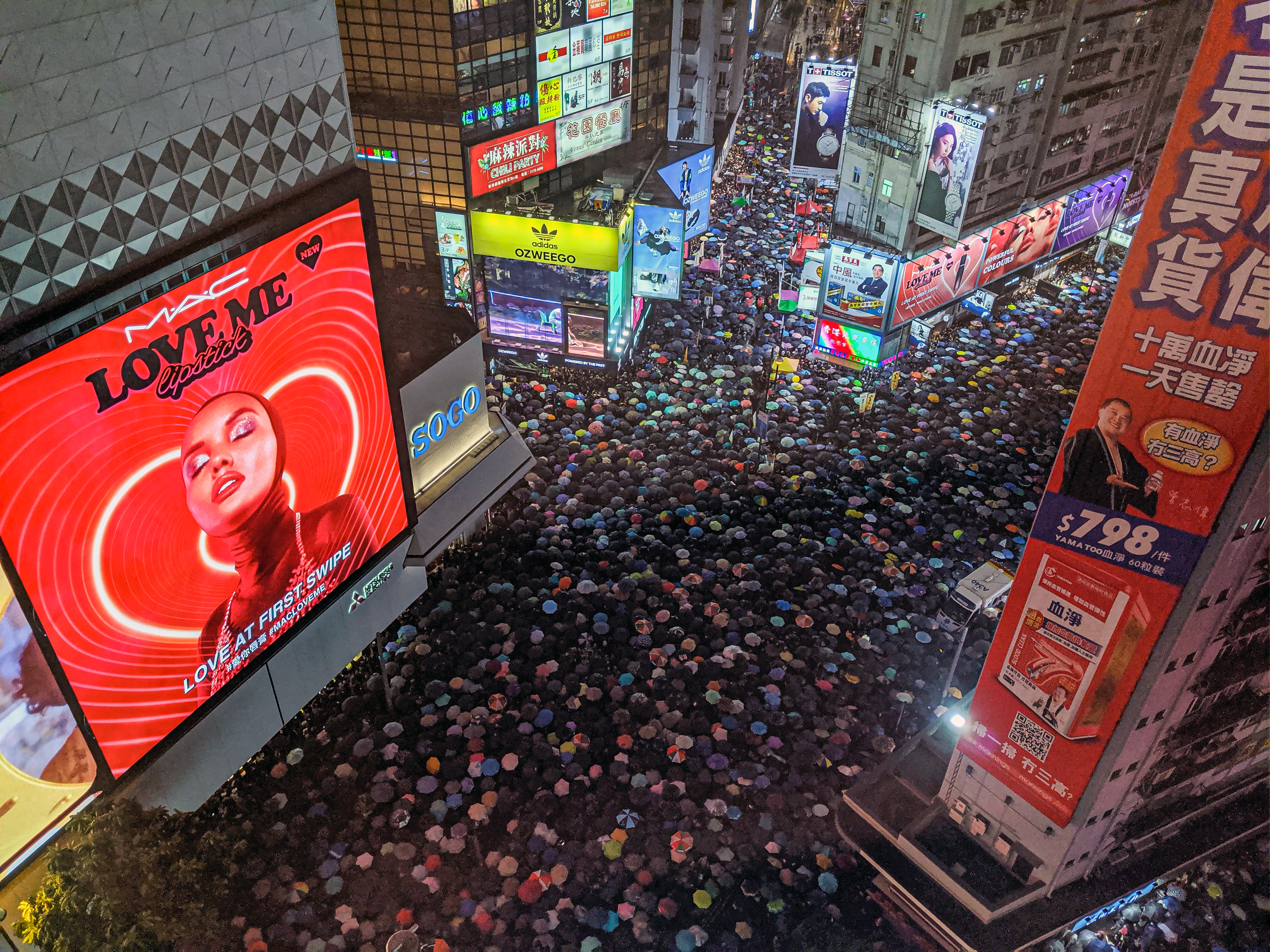
Protesters in Causeway Bay, outside Sogo Department Store, who could not enter the park

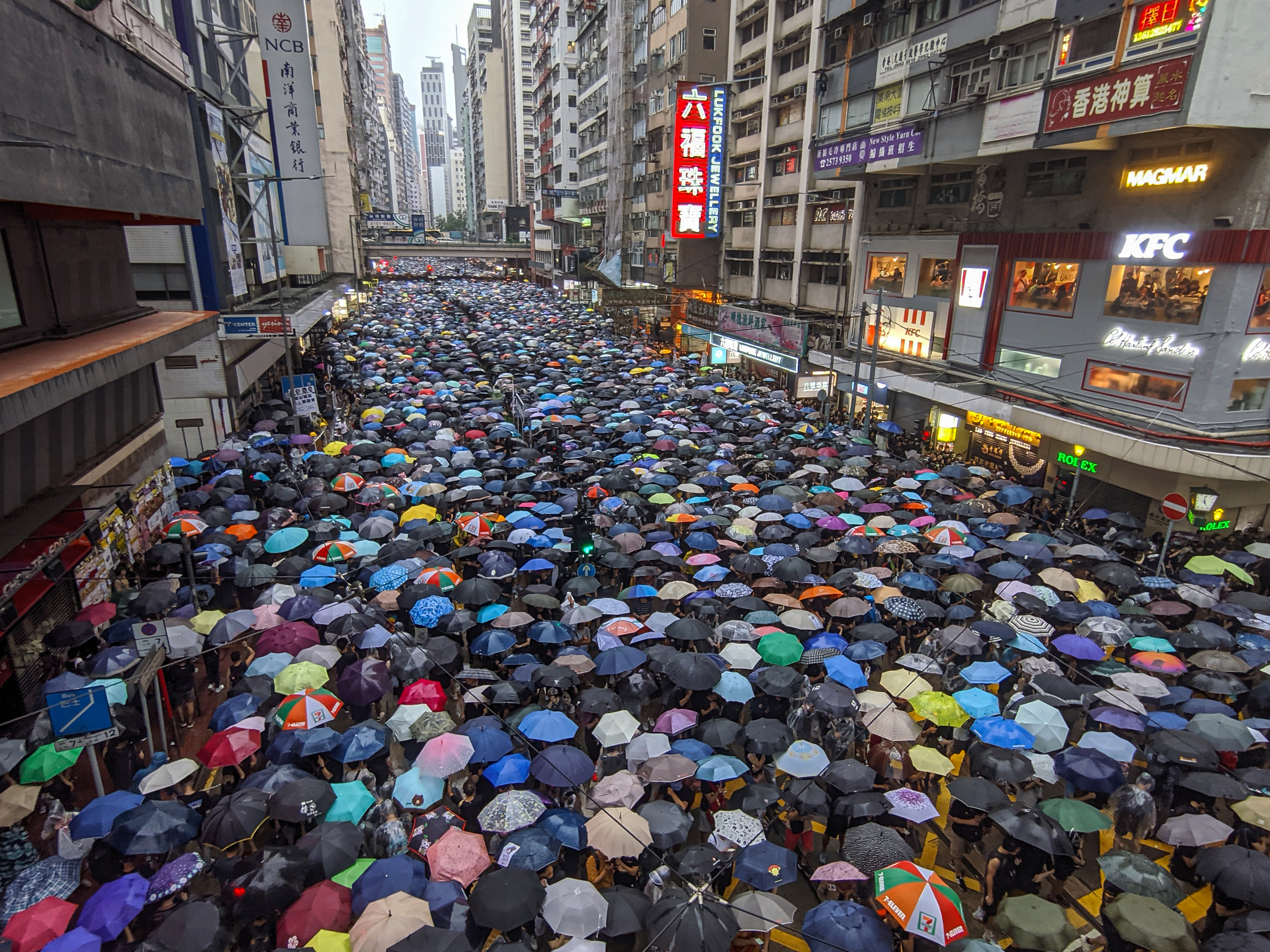
Hundreds of protesters on the streets in Causeway Bay who could not enter the park

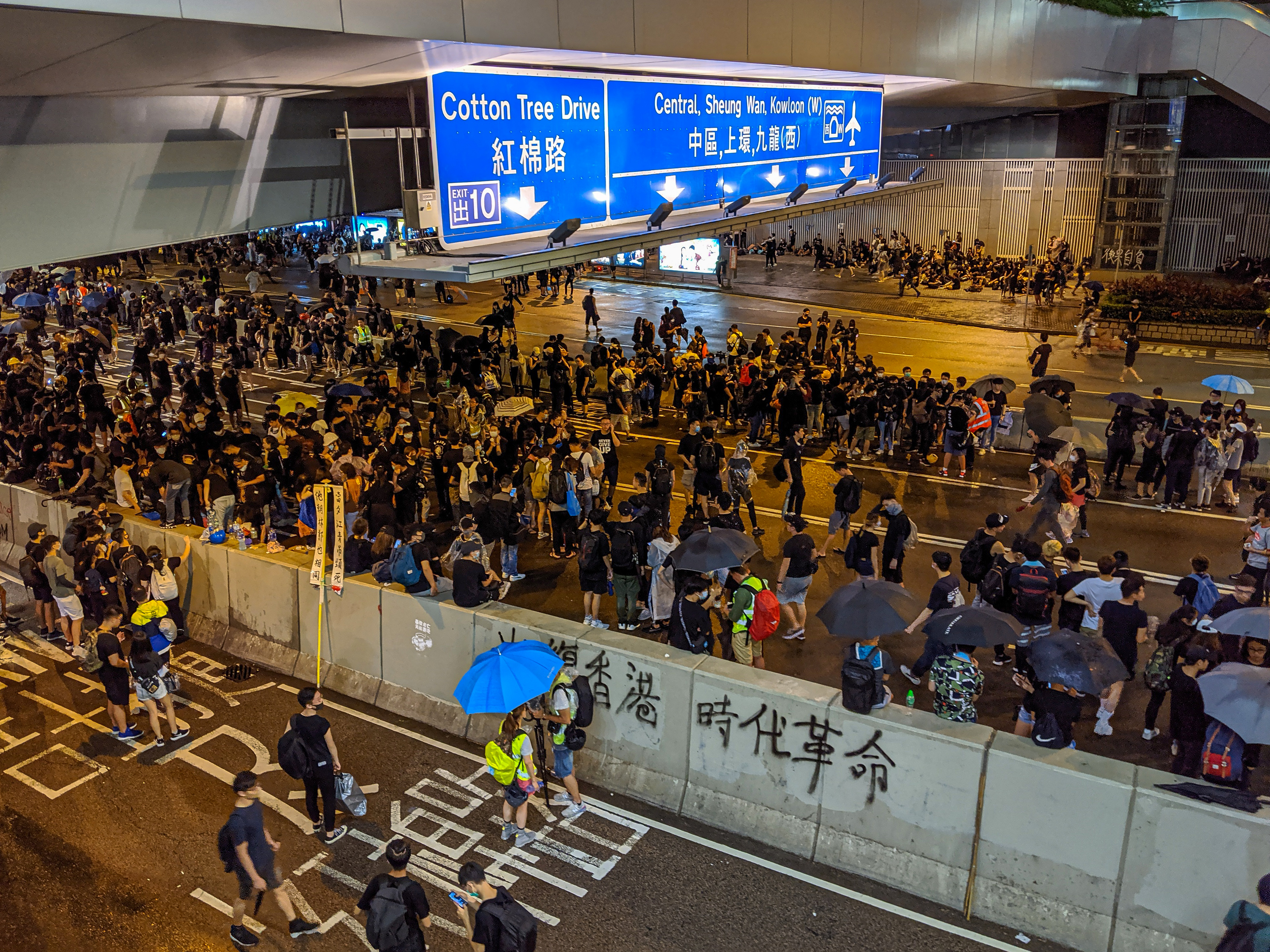
Protesters in Wan Chai after leaving the rally

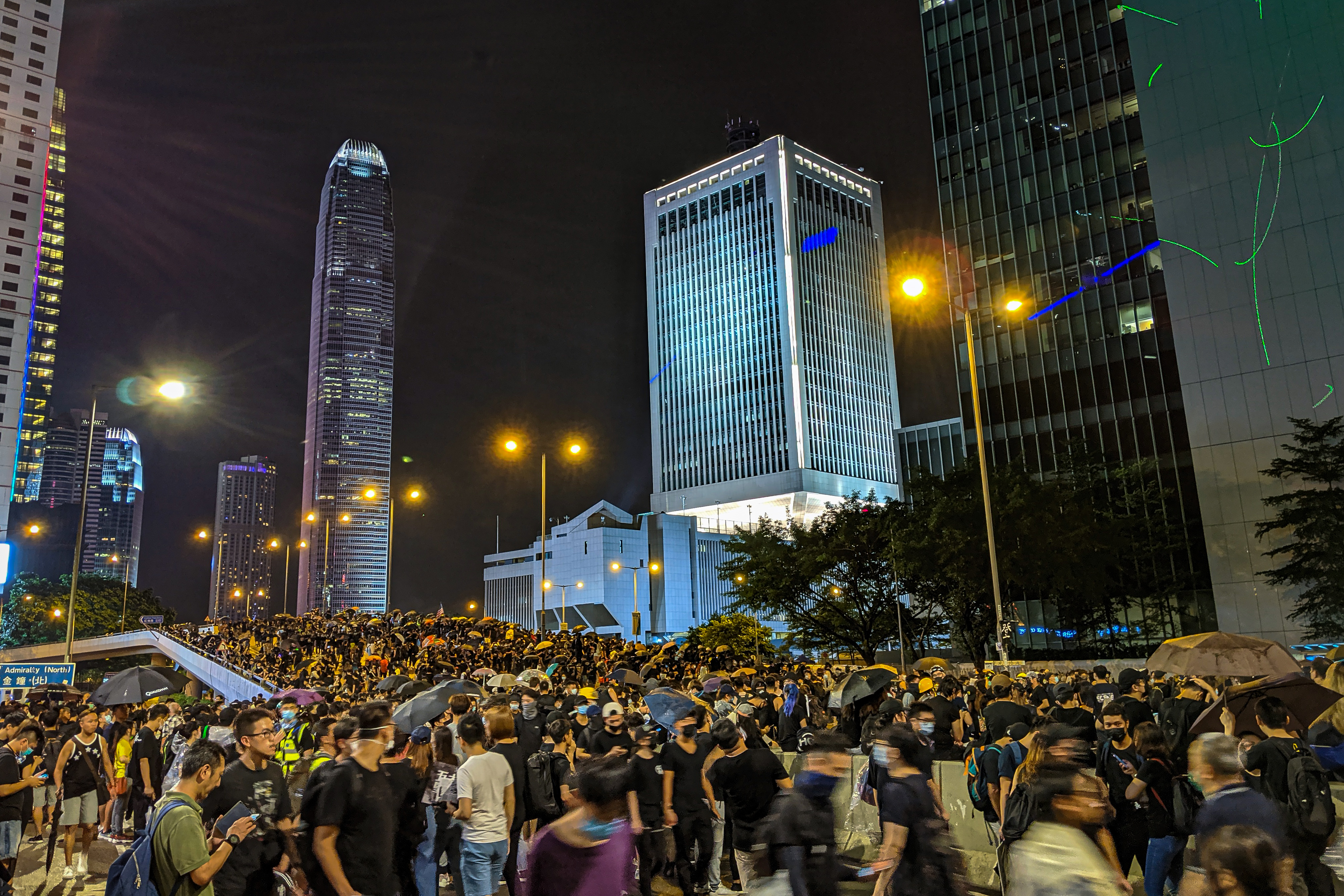
Protesters near the Central Government Complex after the rally

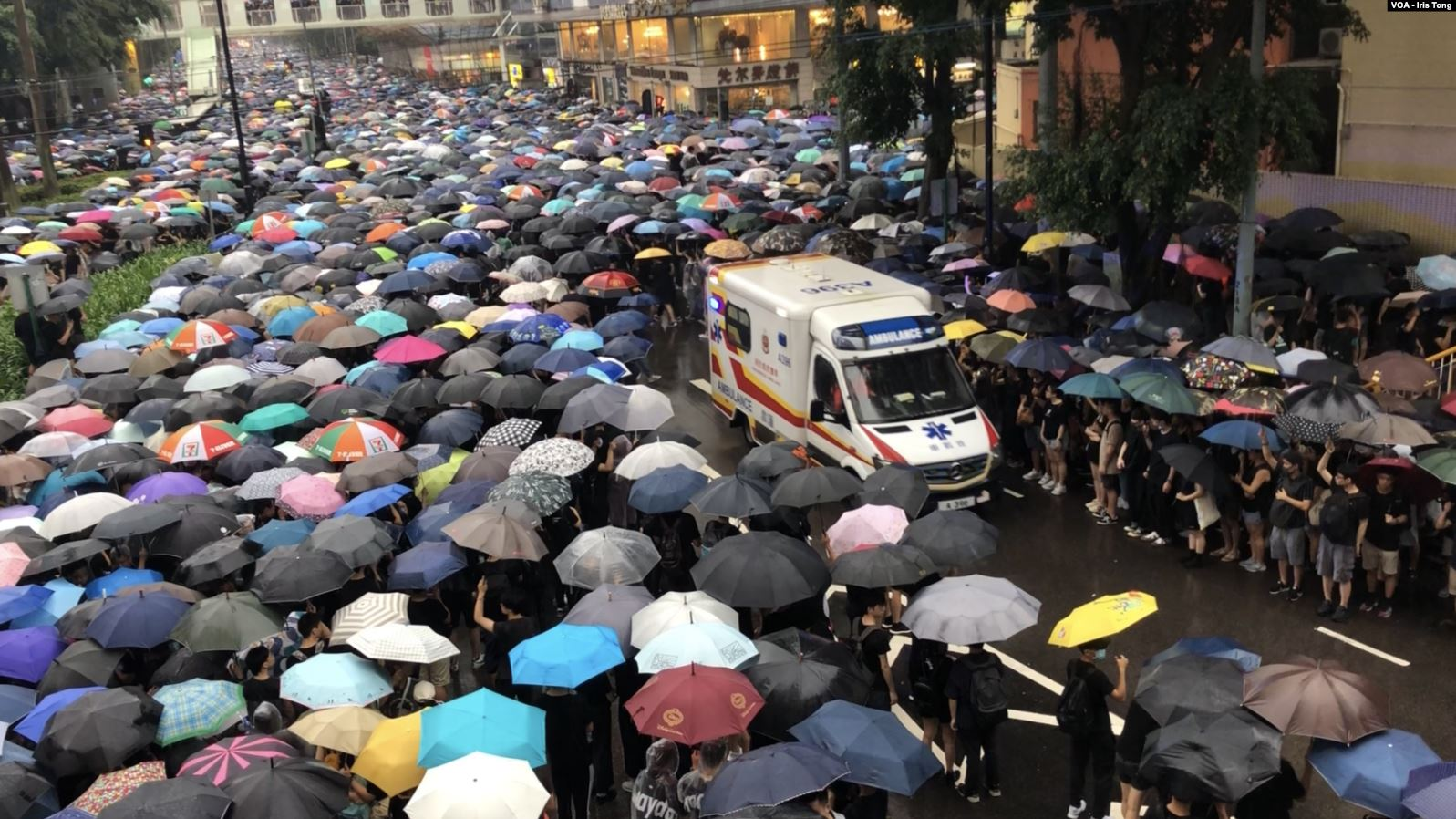
Protesters making way for ambulance

=== 21 August Yuen Long sit-in ===
Thousands of demonstrators staged a sit-in protest inside Yuen Long station to demand justice and to remember the victims of the 21 July Yuen Long mob attacks at the night of 21 August. Protesters sat silently in the station, and stood up for a moment of silence every hour. Some protesters also covered their right eyes to remember the victim whose right eye was ruptured during the 11 August protest. Protesters and the police began a brief stand-off near the end of the sit-in. Protesters sprayed a firehose and threw soaps on the floor while making makeshift blockades to slow police's advance. Both protesters and the police retreated peacefully later.

=== 22 August secondary school students demonstration ===
At Edinburgh Place in Central, near City Hall, thousands of secondary school students gathered to oppose the extradition bill legislation. Near the end of the rally, many students chanted "September 2, class boycott!" in reference to the planned strikes set to begin on the first day of classes.

=== 23 August accountants march ===
In the afternoon, around 5,000 accountants marched silently from Charter Garden to the Government HQ. The march, organised by pan-democratic Legislative Councilor Kenneth Leung, was the first march since 1997 that involved accountants. PwC allegedly offered free lunch to employees to prevent them from attending the march.

=== 23 August "The Hong Kong Way" ===
On the evening of 23 August, an estimated 210,000 people participated in "The Hong Kong Way" campaign, to draw attention to the movement's five demands. The action was inspired by a similar event that occurred in the Baltic States 30 years ago. Participants assembled at 7 pm on pavements along the three main MTR lines in Hong Kong – the Tsuen Wan line, Kwun Tong line and Island line — and to hold hands, creating three human chains totalling 50 kilometres long, stretching across both sides of Hong Kong harbour.

More than 1,000 trail runners and hikers also scaled Lion Rock, a landmark that symbolises to many the spirit of Hong Kong and lighted their trail with torches.

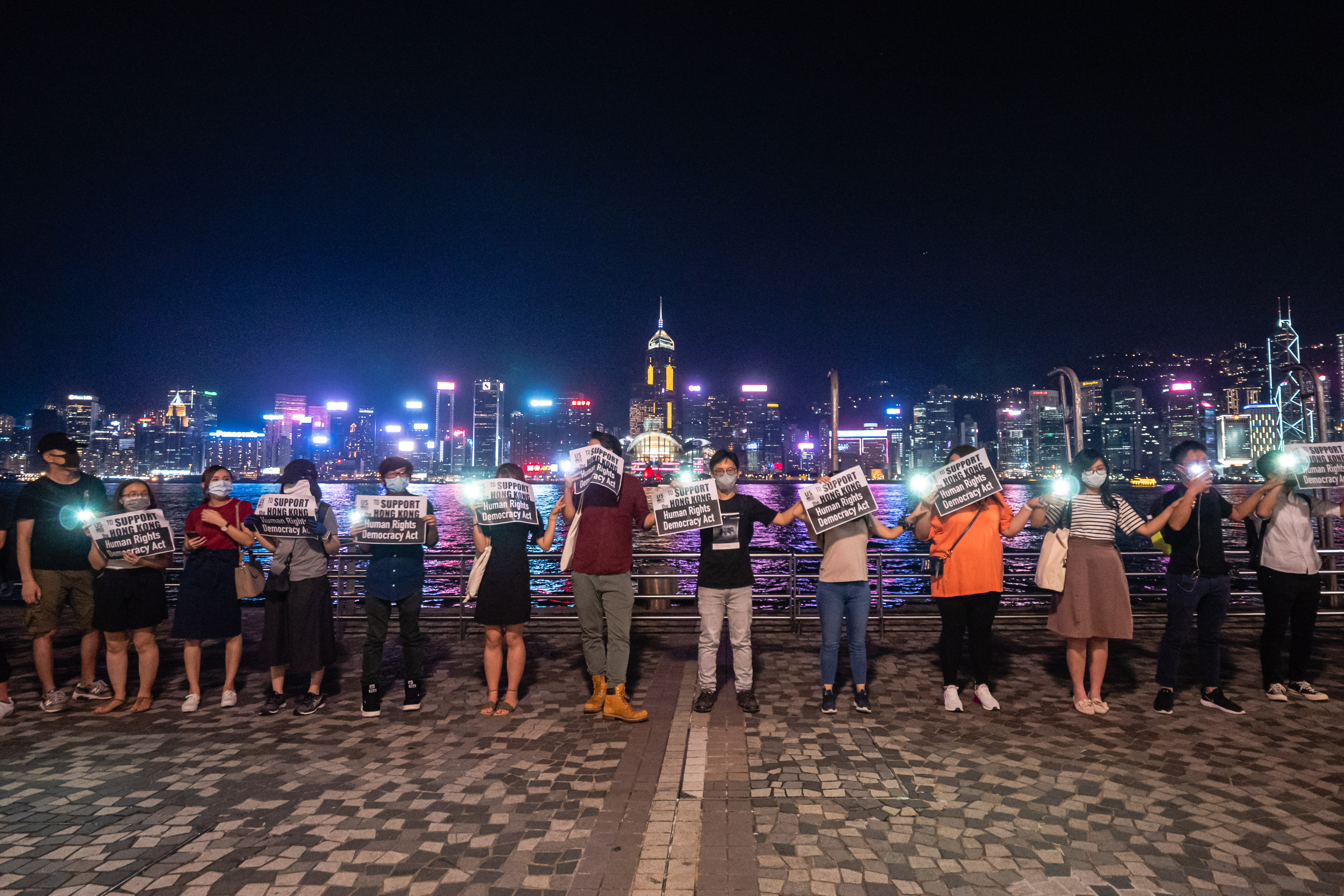
Protesters holding hands in Tsim Sha Tsui pier

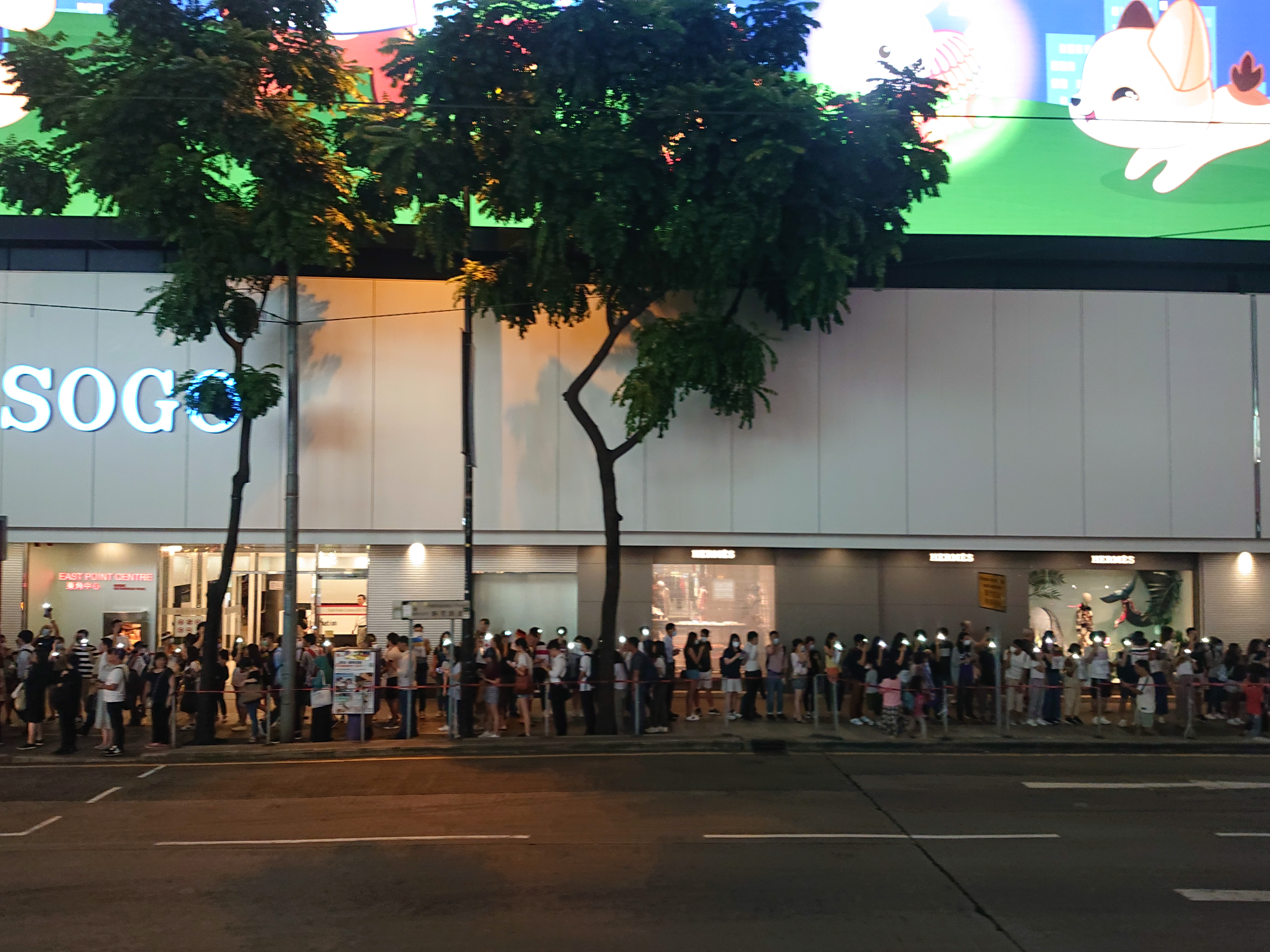
"The Hong Kong Way" outside Causeway Bay Sogo Department Store

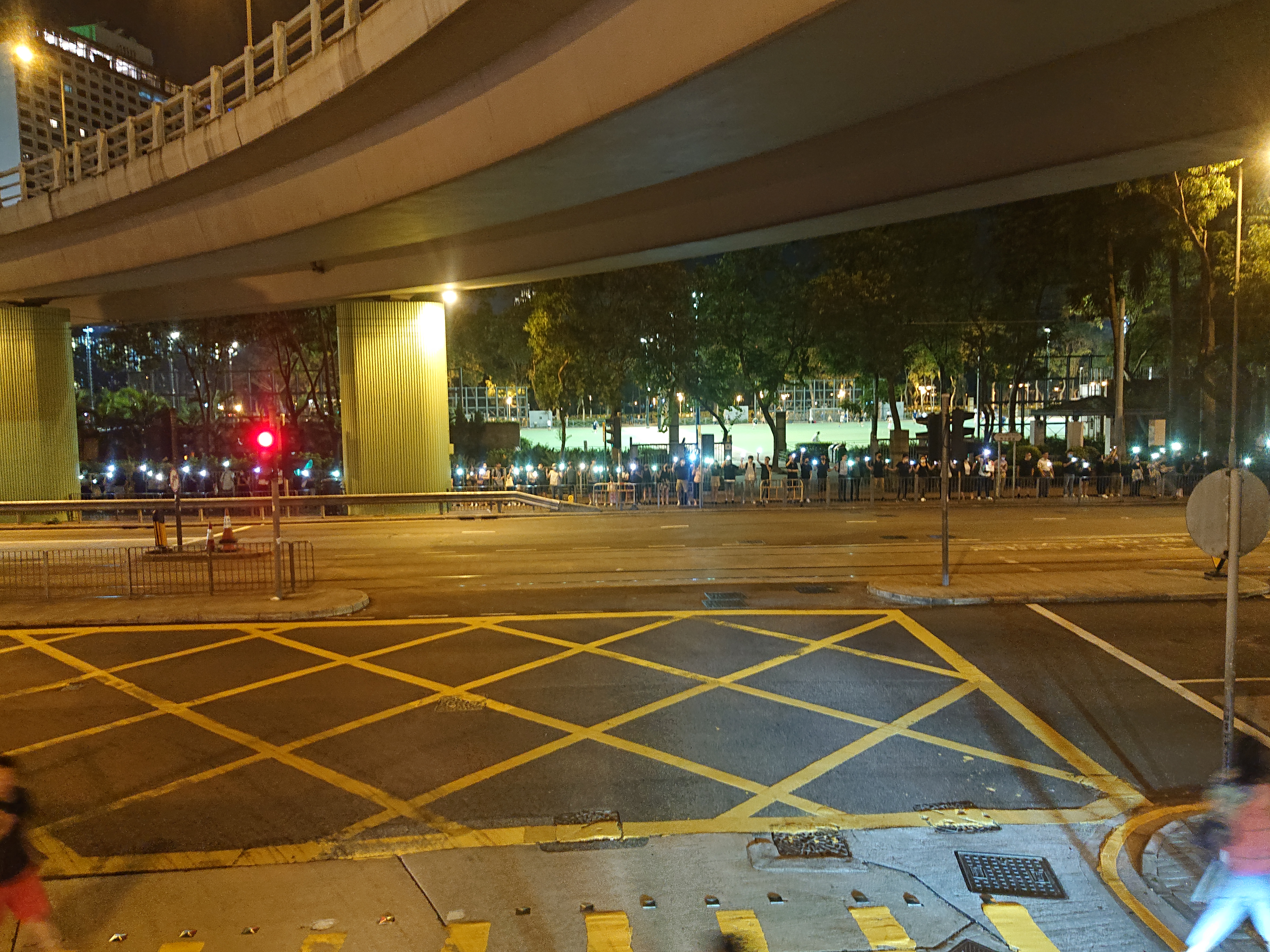
"The Hong Kong Way" outside Victoria Park

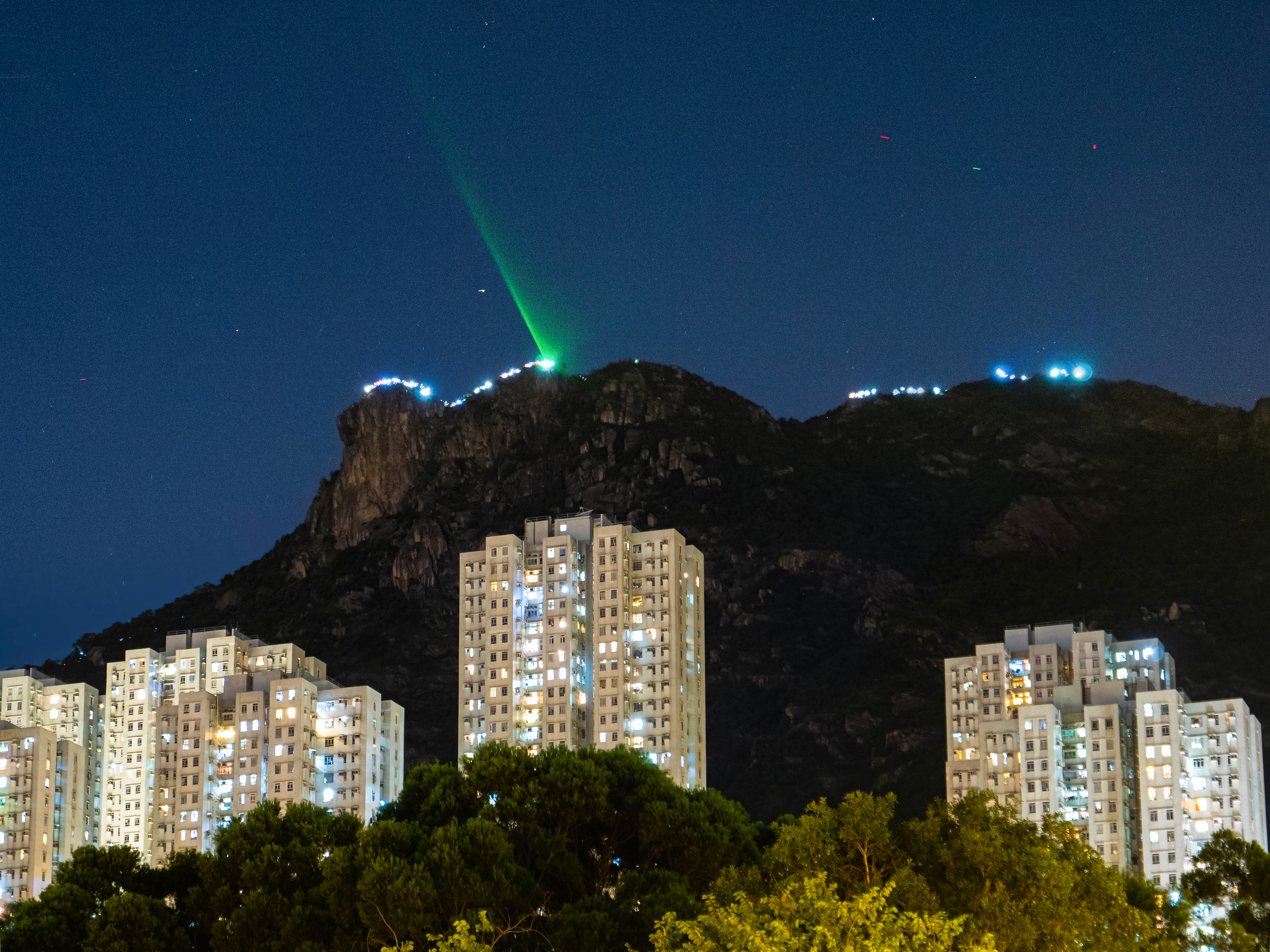
Over 1,000 trail runners and nature lovers gathered atop Lion Rock for The Hong Kong Way

=== 24 August Kwun Tong anti-surveillance protest ===
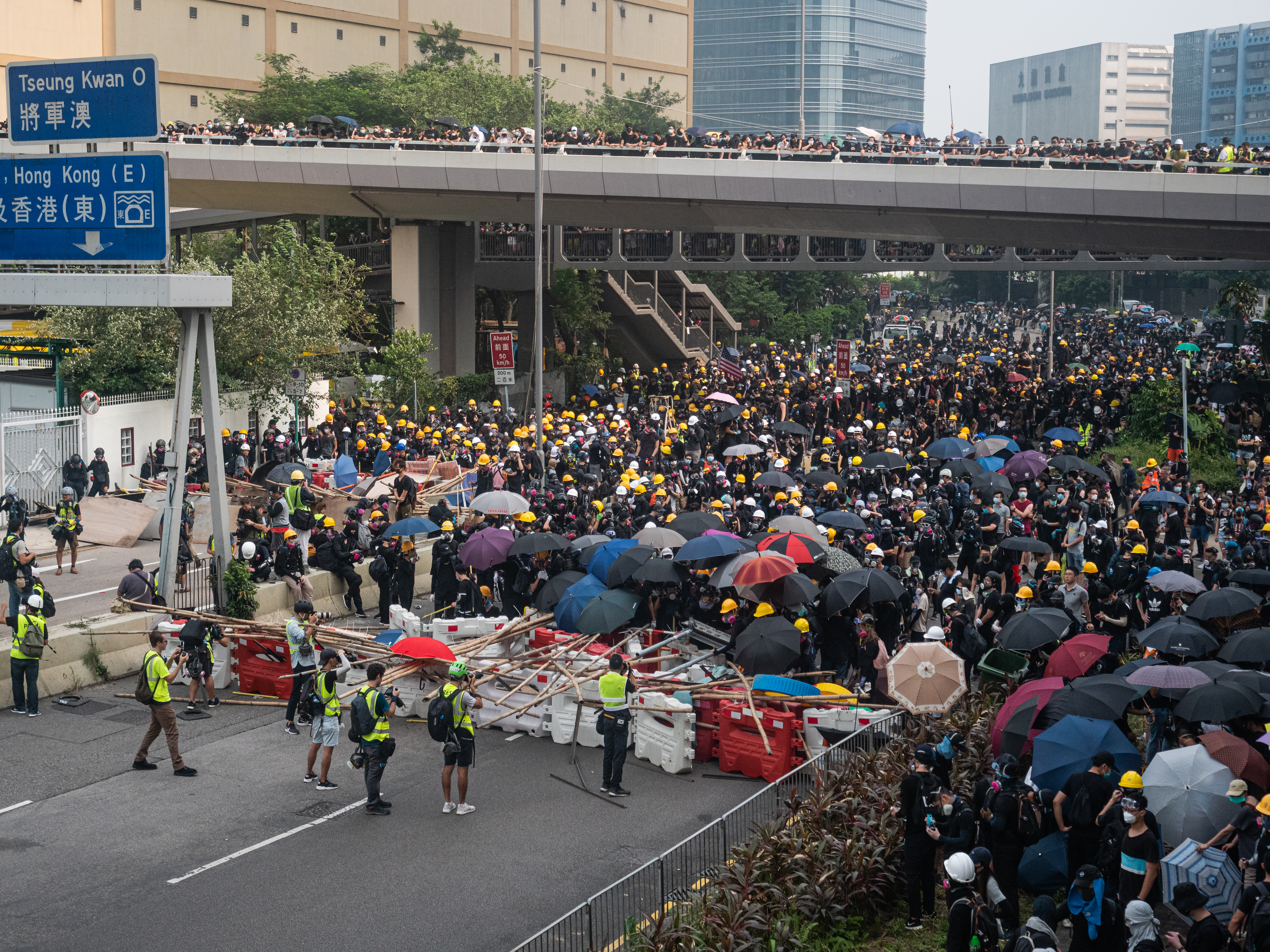
Protesters constructing barricades in Kwun Tong.

On 24 August, a protest was held in Kwun Tong to oppose the extradition bill, however the primary theme of the march was to resist government installed surveillance equipment. The protest was initially banned by the police, though the ban was lifted after the route of the protest was changed. Thousands of people marched from Tsun Yip Street Playground to the Zero Carbon Building in Kowloon Bay. During the march, protesters expressed concerns about recently installed smart lampposts enabled with facial recognition and video surveillance capabilities. Many worried that the lampposts would be used to further restrict freedom in Hong Kong, as China continues to tighten its grip. During the protest, one of these smart lampposts was knocked down and dismantled.

At around 4:15 pm, protesters began to occupy sections of Wai Yip Street near Ngau Tau Kok Police Station and hurled objects at the police, while the police responded by using tear gas, beanbag rounds and pepper balls to disperse the protesters. Some protesters then retreated to Telford Garden and sprayed water hose at officers, and the police used tear gas and sponge grenade in return. Kwun Tong Road was briefly occupied by both the police and the protesters. At night, protesters moved to Wong Tai Sin, Lok Fu and Sham Shui Po.

Before the protest began, MTR suddenly announced that stations between the proposed march area, Choi Hung station and Tiu Keng Leng station, would be closed, and claimed the move was necessary to protect MTR facilities and staff safety. Many criticised this decision as an act to restrict freedom of protest, and that by closing these stations, MTR had caused greater disturbance to the public. MTR also arranged special trains for the officers. Protesters criticised MTR for co-operating with the police and called it the "railway of the Communist Party".

Following the Kwun Tong protest, Richland Gardens's management suddenly changed the passcodes for all buildings. People wearing black and residents who were not carrying their resident card could not enter their homes. Disgruntled residents then surrounded the management office. Security guards called the police, who arrested two residents and used pepper spray on the crowds.

The march's organiser, Ventus Lau, was arrested for "unlawful assembly" after the protest, even though the police had approved the march.

The day after the Hong Kong Way human chain peaceful protest event, two black-with-white-font 15-meters long banners were put up over night on Lion Rock. One read "Evil Police Brutality " (「黑警濫暴」) and the other said "This Regime Kills" (「殺人政權」).

=== 25 August Kwai Chung and Tsuen Wan protest ===
A protest march commenced from Kwai Chung in Kwai Tsing District and moved to Tsuen Wan District. Similar to the Kwun Tong protest, the police lifted an initial ban after the organisers changed the route of the protest. MTR announced on the day that it would close Kwai Fong station, Tsuen Wan station and Tsuen Wan West station temporarily from 1:30 p.m.

On 25 August, thousands of protesters marched from Kwai Chung Sports Ground to Tsuen Wan Park. Near Yeung Uk Road, some protesters occupied a section of Yeung Uk Road and created makeshift roadblocks. The police used tear gas to disperse protesters, who threw petrol bombs. The police also deployed two specialised crowd management vehicles equipped with water cannon that had been prepared for months, firing it twice in the span of one hour. This was the first time the trucks were deployed. The march ended abruptly, but the protests spread to different districts around the city. Several protesters damaged a Fujianese owned mahjong school in Yi Pei Square, claiming the school are associated with a previous knife attack in Tsuen Wan on 5 August.

The first usage of live bullets during the protests occurred on this day. During an incident where multiple police officers were being chased and attacked by a crowd of protesters with makeshift weapons, one police officer fell on the ground, and another police officer fired a warning shot at the sky. More guns were drawn by the police and pointed to protesters and journalists, but they did not fire again and later retreated. Police later explained that they had no choice after being surrounded by protesters, but some residents questioned whether their action was necessary. One man with an umbrella knelt in front of an advancing police officer who had drawn a gun, in an effort to persuade the officer not to shoot. The man was kicked by the officer. Hong Kong police had responded by saying that the officer used his leg to "push him away".

The protest later spread to Tsim Sha Tsui, Cross-Harbour Tunnel, Sham Shui Po and Wong Tai Sin. For both marches in Kwun Tong and Tsuen Wan, the police had used 215 canisters of tear gas, 74 rubber bullets, 44 sponge grenades and four bean bag rounds.

On 21 November 2023, a judge sentenced six male protesters, one of them already being in jail for a separate protest case, and one female protester to up to twelve months in jail. The group, who had been intercepted with protest gear, had pleaded not guilty to the original charge of conspiring to riot, pleading instead guilty to other charges.

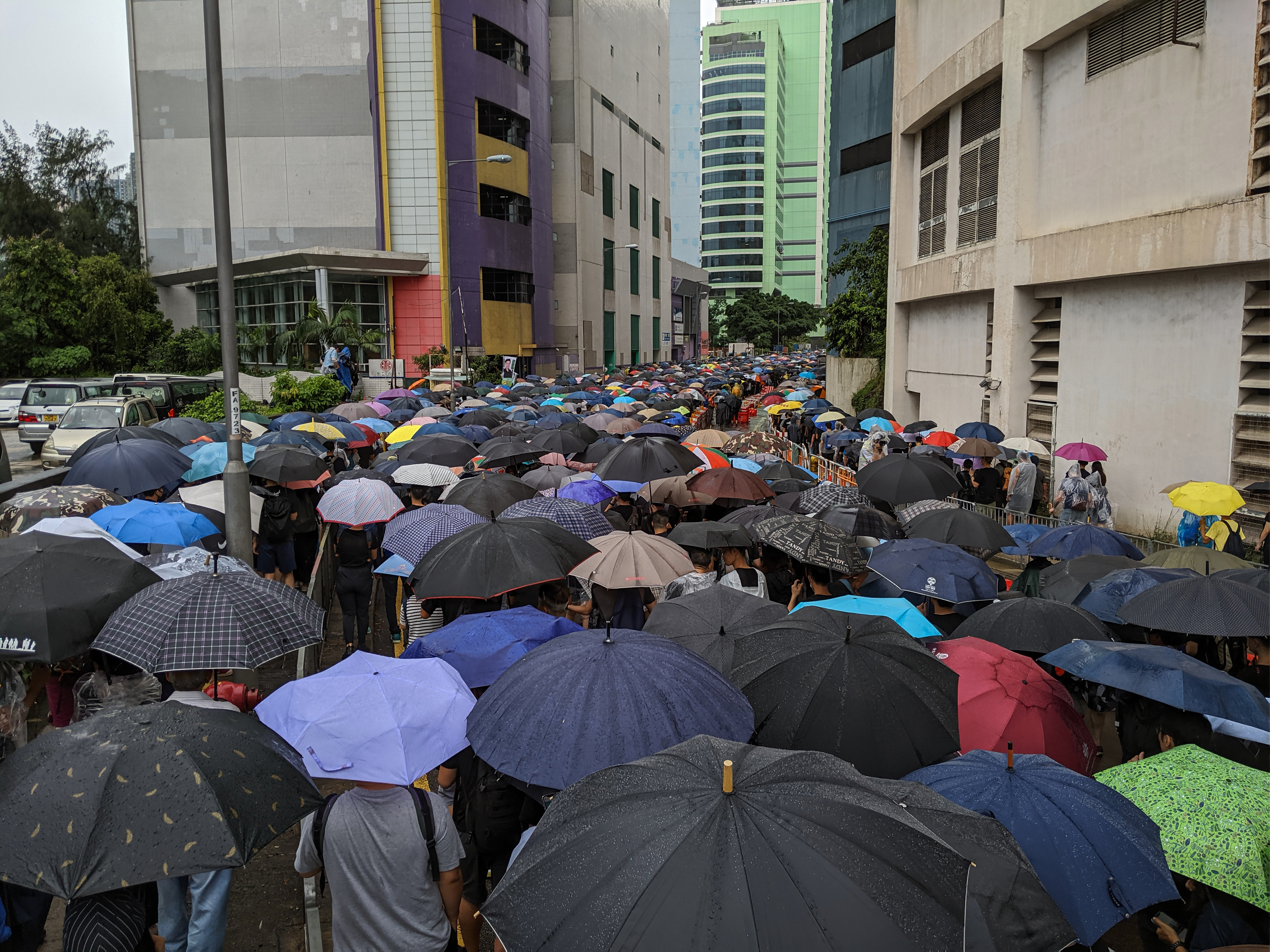
Protesters in Tsuen Wan

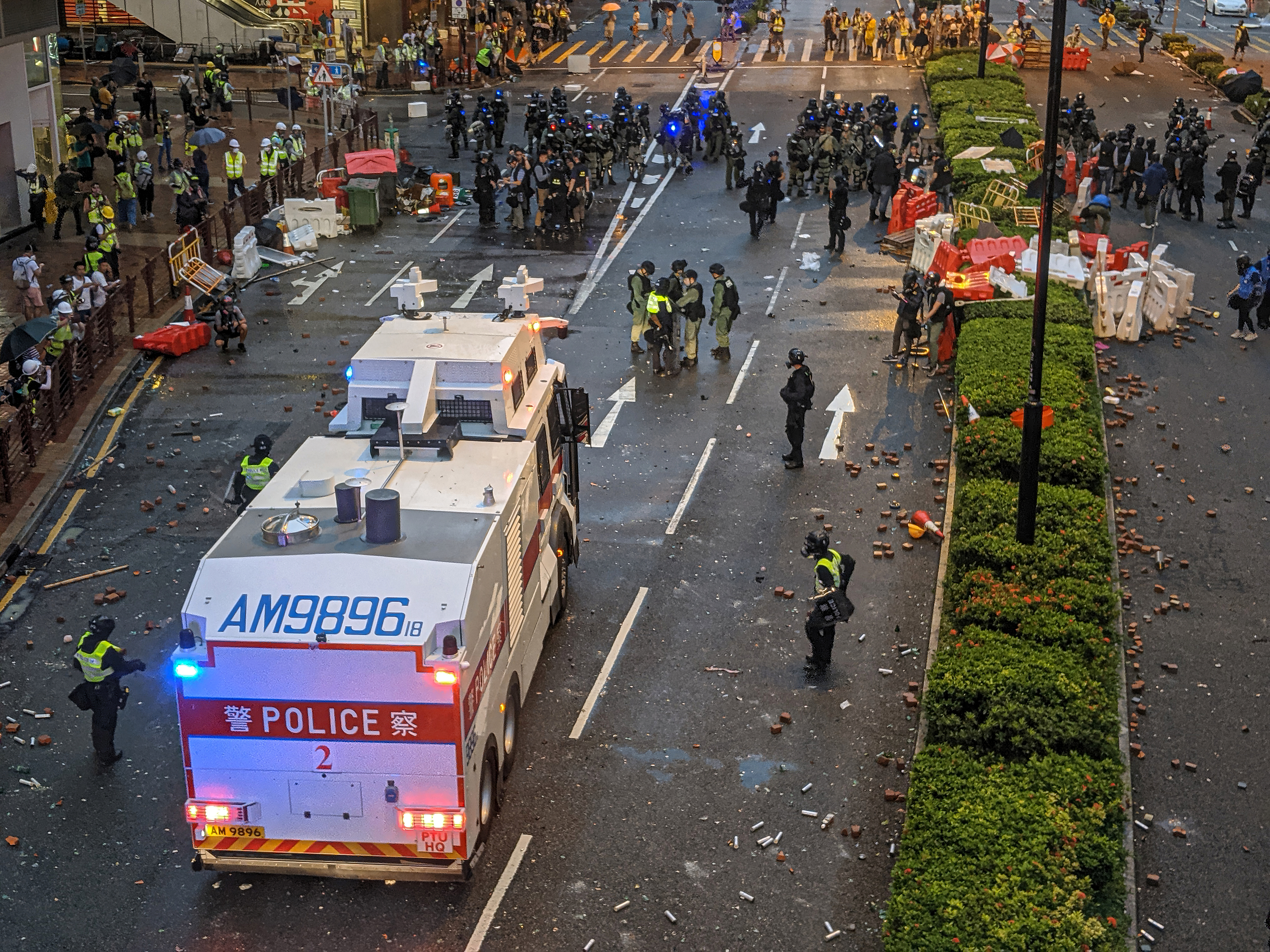
The police, for the first time, deployed two specialised crowd management vehicles equipped with water cannon.

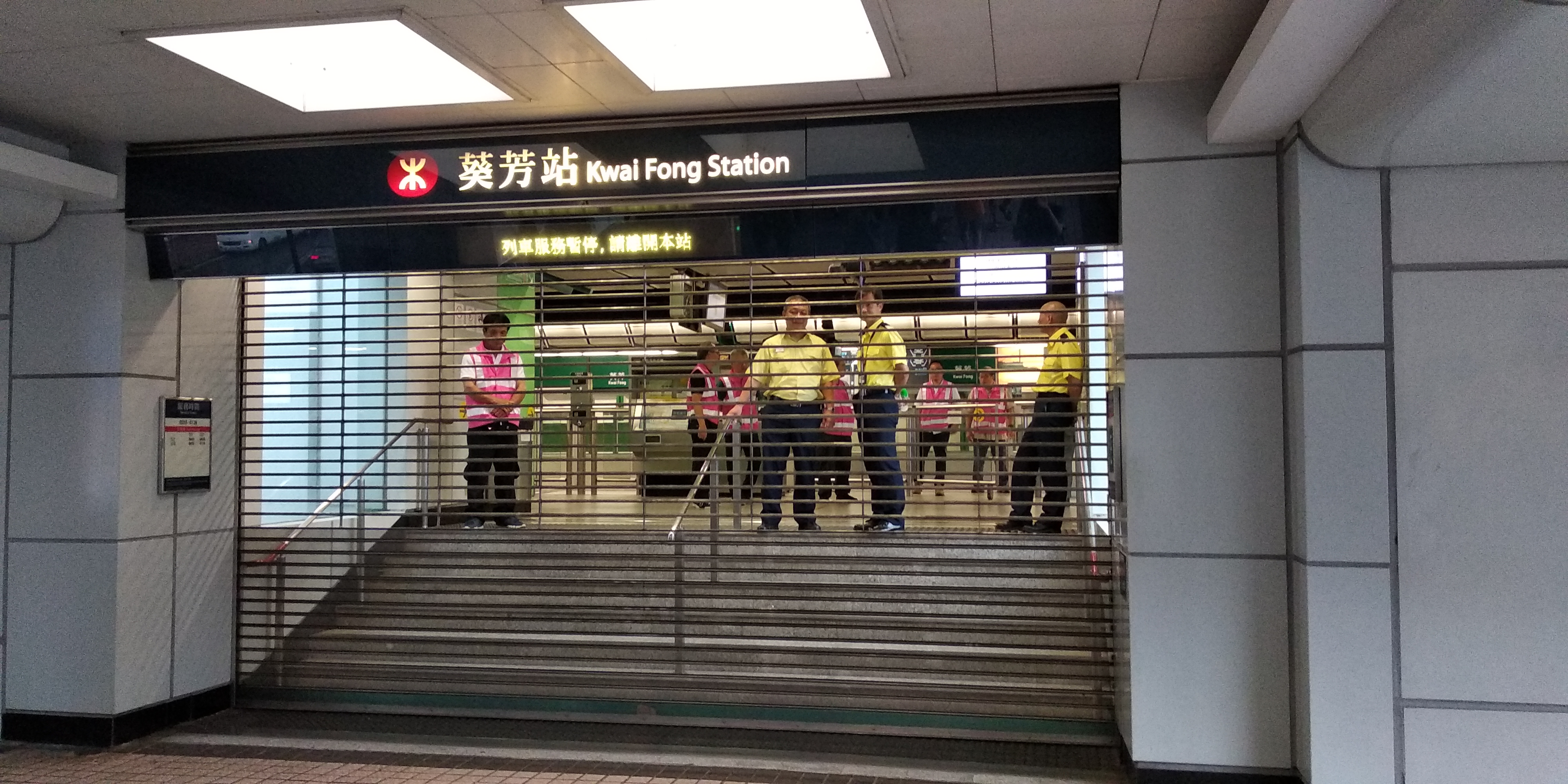
Kwai Fong station was closed before the march.

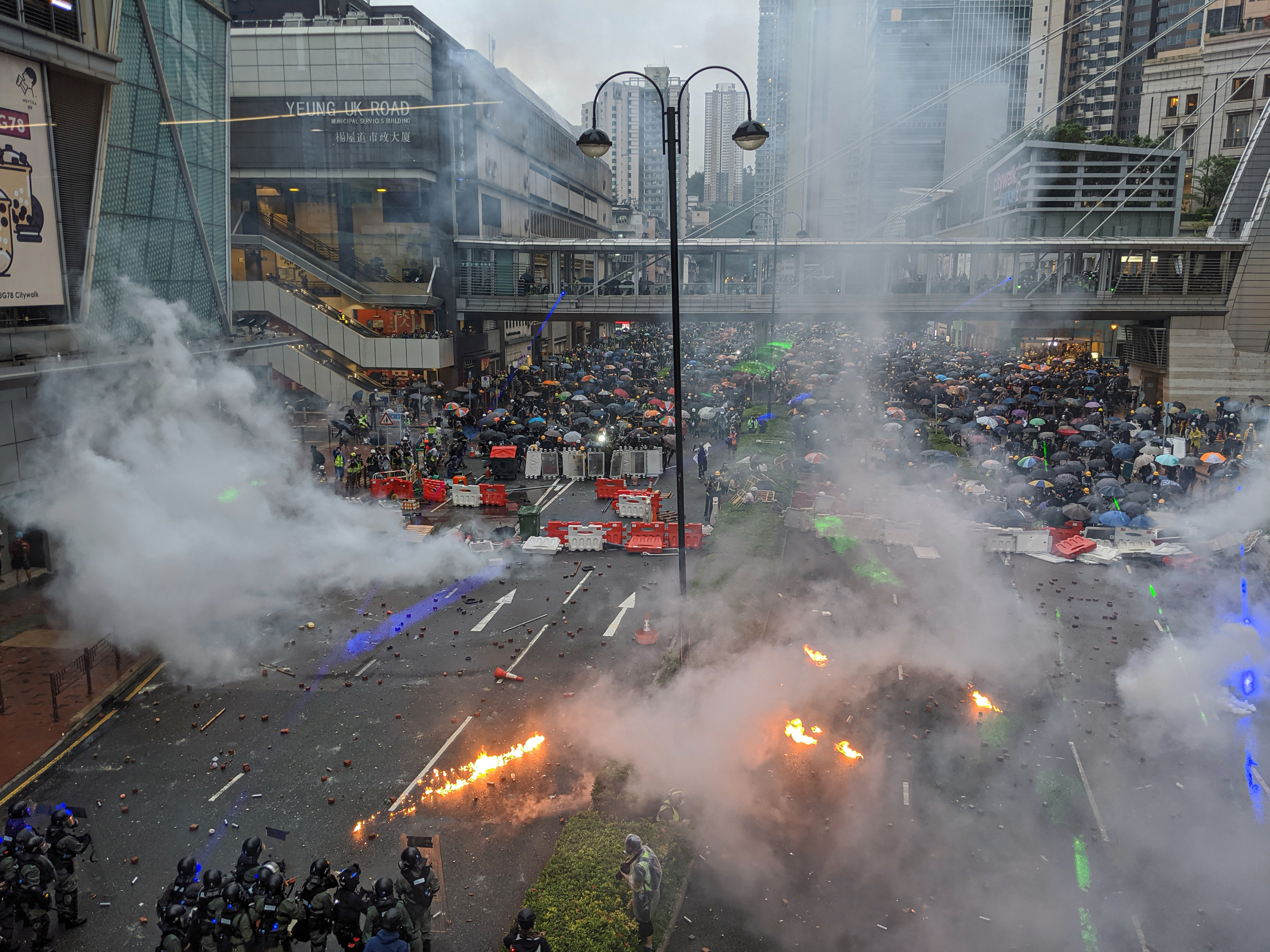
Standoff between protesters and the police at Yeung Uk Road

=== 25 August Police Relatives Connection protest ===
At the same time as the protests in Tsuen Wan, the Police Relatives Connection, a group claiming to represent relatives of members of the police force, staged a march from Edinburgh Square in Central to the Chief Executive's Office in Admiralty to give a letter outlining their own version of the "five demands". Their demands were for Lam to respond to public demands, senior police commanders to plan operations to minimise clashes, establish a platform for dialogue between the force and the public, for officers to remain disciplined, and to create an independent inquiry into police misconduct (a key demand of the protests). However, due to a lack of response, they submitted their letter at police headquarters in Wan Chai, where they also expressed appreciation for officers' efforts to preserve order, recited the force's passing out oath, and criticised police brutality. Organisers claimed that 400 people marched, while police counted 270. They said that the police were drawn into a political problem and admitted some police officers lost control of their emotions while performing their duties.

=== 28 August aviation industry rally ===
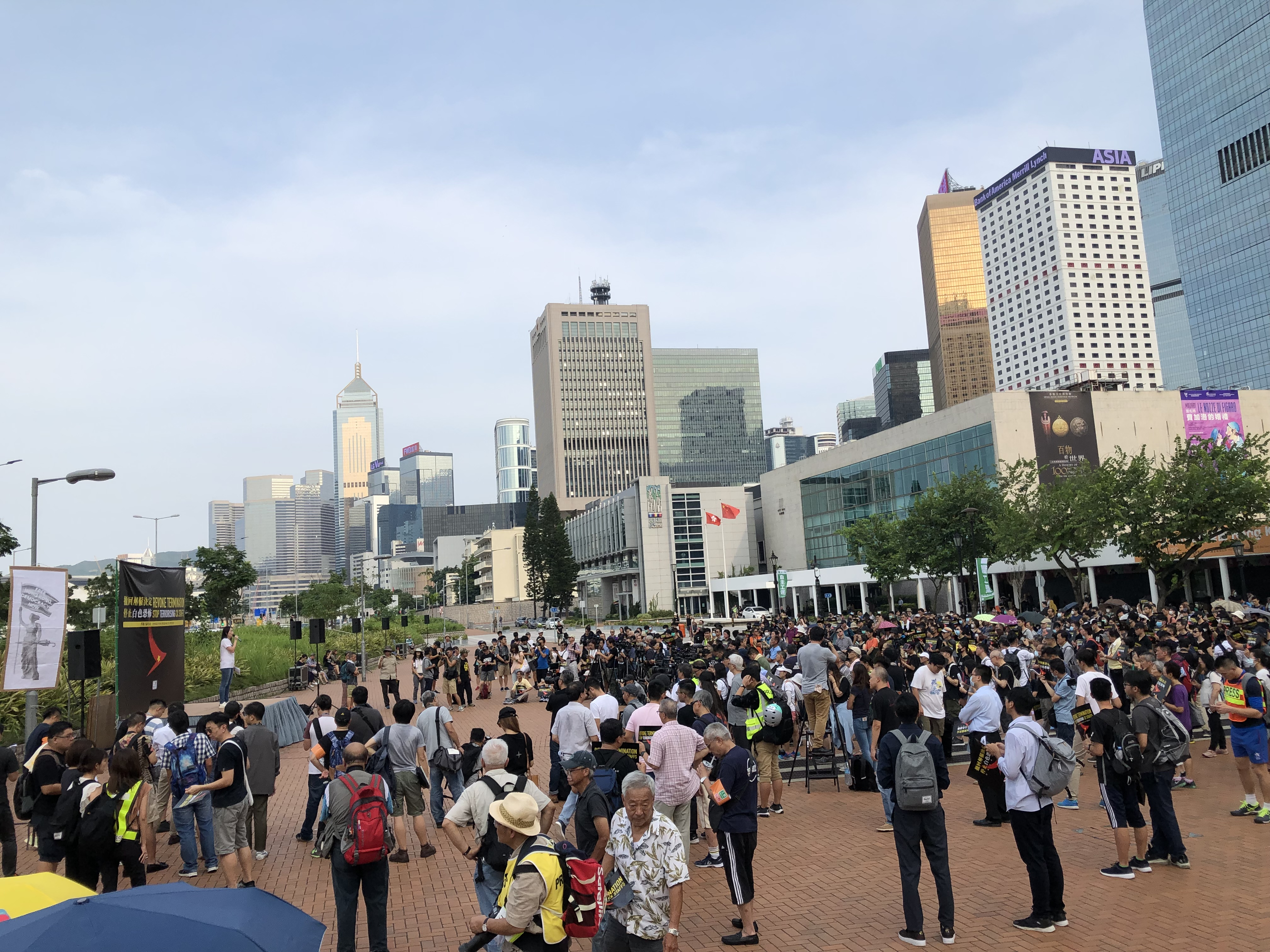
Protesters gathered in Edinburgh Place against Cathay Pacific on 28 August 2019.

As of 28 August 20 aviation staff professionals had been sacked or had resigned after Beijing exerted pressure on companies to crack down on the anti-government movement. Demonstrators gathered in Edinburgh Place, Central around 4 pm to support Rebecca Sy On-na, a 17-years employee of Cathay Dragon and chairwoman of the 2,000-member Dragon Airlines Flight Attendants Association over her Facebook posts and to protest against the airline's alleged political persecution and what they called 'white terror' towards employees linked to the protest movement. The protesters later marched to Pacific Place, a luxury shopping centre that houses the headquarters of Swire Pacific, the majority shareholder in Cathay Pacific Airways. The rally was organised by Hong Kong Confederation of Trade Unions. Police estimated that 730 people took part in the protest.

=== 28 August #MeToo rally ===
On the evening of 28 August, a #MeToo gathering was held in Chater Garden to protest alleged police misconduct during a strip-search of a female arrestee. Thousands attended the demonstration, and the woman involved in the incident appeared on stage to address the crowd. The slogan of the event was "Stop Hong Kong police's use of sexual violence." Several weeks prior, in early August, police were similarly accused of violating the rights of another woman while taking her into custody.

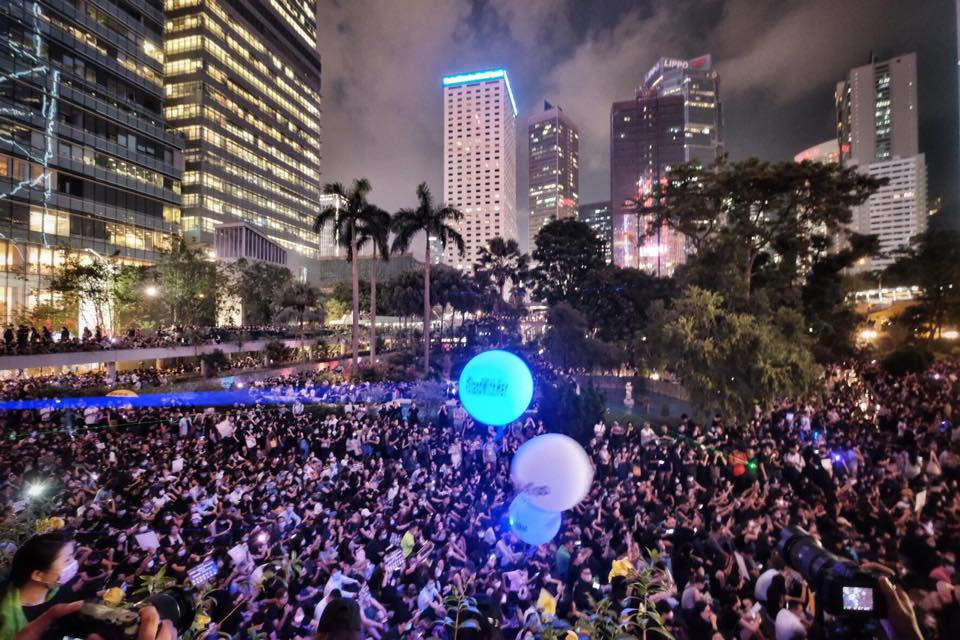
Thousands of protesters gathered in Chater Garden.

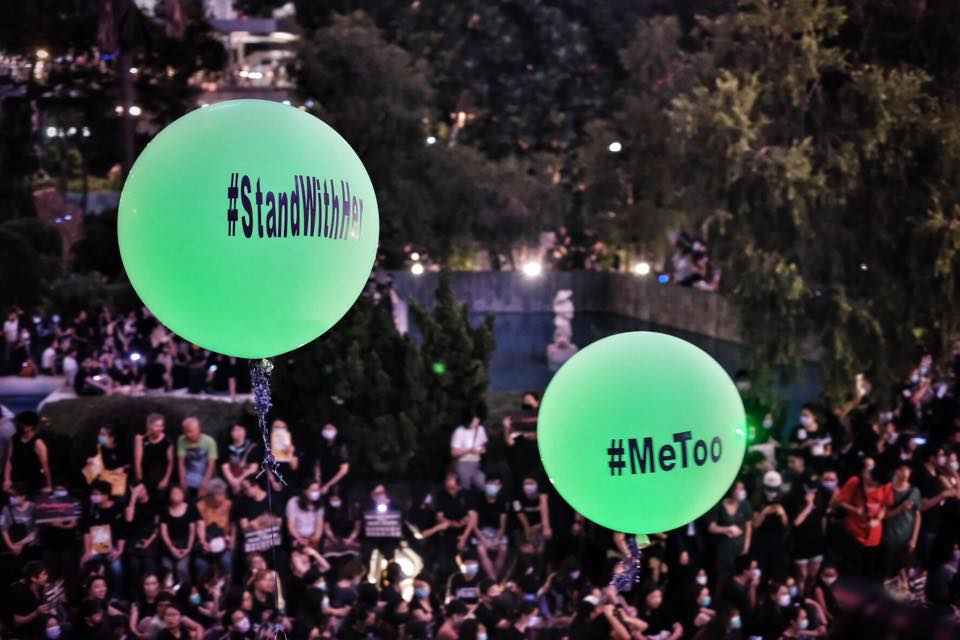
Hashtag #StandWithHer and #MeToo in large balloons

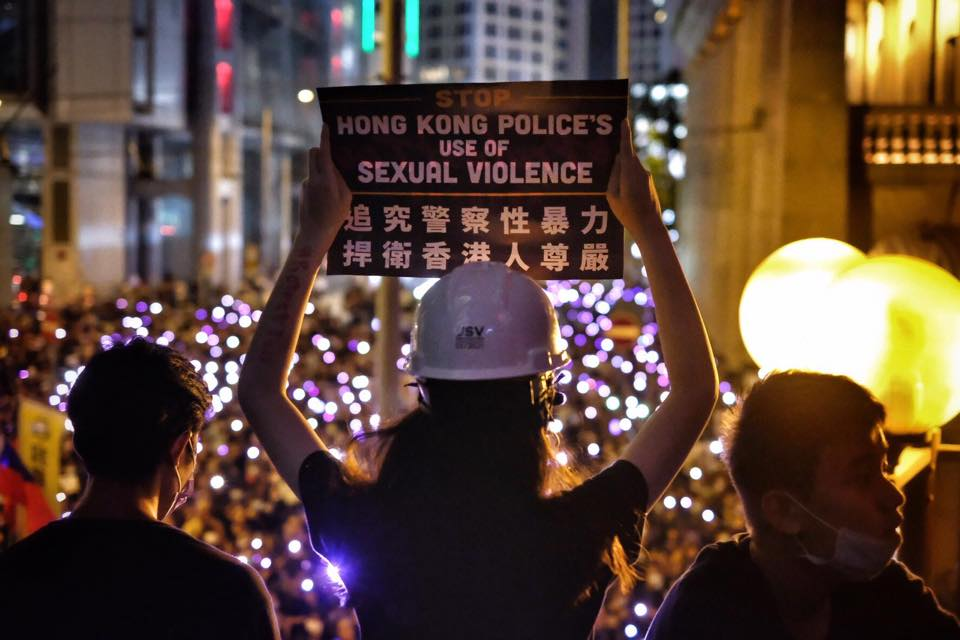
Protesters holding signs protesting against alleged police sexual violence

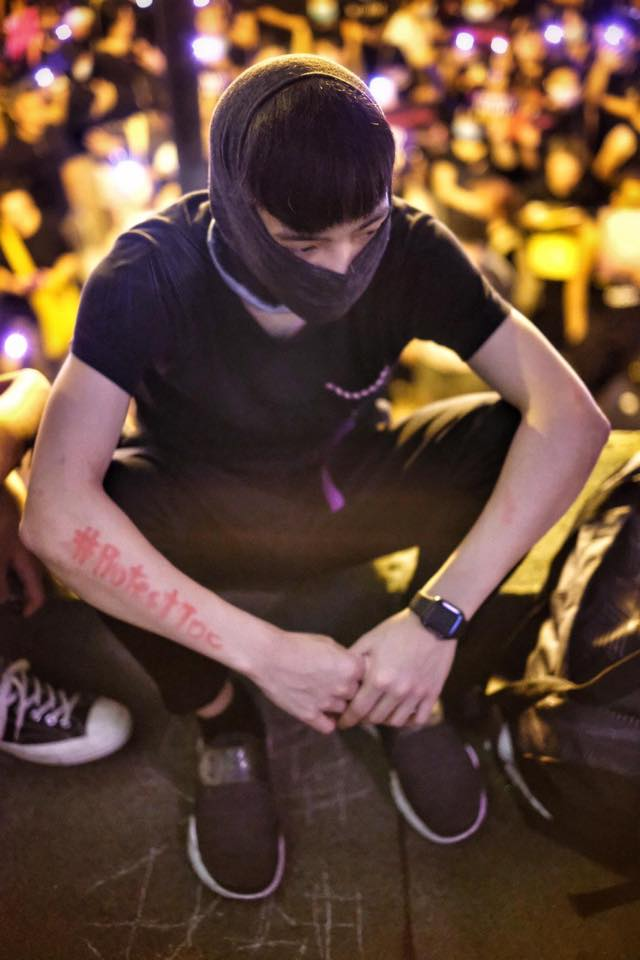
Protester with "#ProtestToo" written on their arm with lipstick

=== 29 August citywide screenings of Winter on Fire and more hilltop vertical protest banners ===
On the evening of 29 August, citywide screenings for the Netflix documentary film Winter on Fire: Ukraine's Fight for Freedom were held by communities in 40 different locations throughout Hong Kong. The screenings were mostly held outdoors. Evgeny Afineevsky, the director of the short film, previously wrote a letter of support for the Hong Kong activists.

As the anti-extradition protests continued, more hill-top vertical protest banners were put out to show solidarity with those who were arrested. The yellow eight-meter long vertical protest banner read "Redress Riot, Release Chivalry" (「平反暴動釋放義士」).

=== 30 August social workers protest ===
The Anti-extradition Bill Social Welfare Alliance, a group made up of dozens of social workers, protested outside the Social Welfare Department in the afternoon demanding more protection and support. They stated that they attend protests to offer humanitarian support to young participants, and to help people leave safely. Despite this program of peaceful social outreach, the police have arrested many of their colleagues on suspicion of taking part in illegal assemblies.

=== 30 August animal lovers rally ===
Hundreds of animal lovers turned up in the evening at Chater Garden in Central to urge the police to stop using tear gas because of the harmful impact it has on pets, strays, and even police dogs. The participants stated they are extremely concerned about the deployment of tear gas, saying it is unclear how the toxic chemicals would affect nearby animals since the animals’ sense of smell is much more acute than that of humans, and it stands to reason that they would be more seriously affected when exposed to chemical crowd control agents.

=== 31 August protests ===
Hong Kong police storm Prince Edward station and attack protesters on 31 August 2019

Following a police ban on a protest applied by the Civil Human Rights Front and the arrests of several high-profile activists including Agnes Chow and Joshua Wong, and pan-democratic Legislative Councilors including Jeremy Tam, Au Nok-hin and Cheng Chung-tai, hundreds of thousands protesters defied the police's ban and joined a Christian march in Wan Chai, while others occupied major roads in Causeway Bay. Some protesters besieged government headquarters and threw bricks and petrol bombs, whereas the police used tear gas, rubber bullets and water cannon trucks, which sprayed coloured liquid on protesters for easy identification. Protesters later set up a line of defence near the Police Headquarters at Hennessy Road by starting a huge fire, though it was extinguished by a water cannon truck. Protesters soon retreated back to Causeway Bay and Tin Hau, where undercover cops arrested several protesters. One of the undercover cops also fired a warning shot inside Victoria Park. The remaining protesters soon spread to Kwun Tong, Mong Kok and Tsim Sha Tsui.

After a quarrel between some protesters and several middle-aged men inside Prince Edward station, a group of Special Tactical Squad officers rushed into the train cabin and assaulted both protesters and commuters who were inside, beating them with batons and releasing pepper-spray. According to witnesses, police simply stormed the station and beat the people inside without making any arrests, and police were accused of continued and excessive force against passengers who were not resisting. Police also chased and beat citizens inside Yau Ma Tei station. MTR later suspended services on five of its lines.

The police assault on passengers inside various MTR stations sparked anger from nearby citizens who then besieged the Mong Kok police station. Residents besieged the Chai Wan Police Married Quarters after the arrest of District Councilor Chui Chi-kin, though they dispersed after the police fired tear gas. Protesters also damaged the gates inside Hang Hau station.

On 1 September, Amnesty International released a statement calling for an investigation into police conduct during the events of 31 August in which police beat and pepper-sprayed people aboard an MTR train at Prince Edward station. According to Tam Man-kei, Director of Amnesty International Hong Kong, the behaviours of the police on that day "fell far short of international policing standards" and he described the police's operation as a "rampage". Convenor of the pan-democratic camp, Claudia Mo, called the incident a "licensed terror attack" as the police injured innocent bystanders.

Two yellow vertical protest banners showed up on Beacon Hill. They were about 15-meters long and demanded "We Demand Genuine Universal Suffrage" (「我要真普選」) and "Retract August 31 Decision" (「撤回人大831」), a reference to Beijing's refusal to grant universal suffrage to Hong Kong on that day in 2014.

Eight protesters who were charged with rioting in Wan Chai were ruled not guilty by a district court in September and November 2020. On 14 July 2023, the Court of Appeal ruled that four of the defendants had to face a retrial as the original judge had been "plainly wrong". The government application to also retrial nine other defendants, five of whom belonged to a separate case, was dismissed by the Court of Appeal as those defendants had left Hong Kong and paperwork could therefore not be served to them.

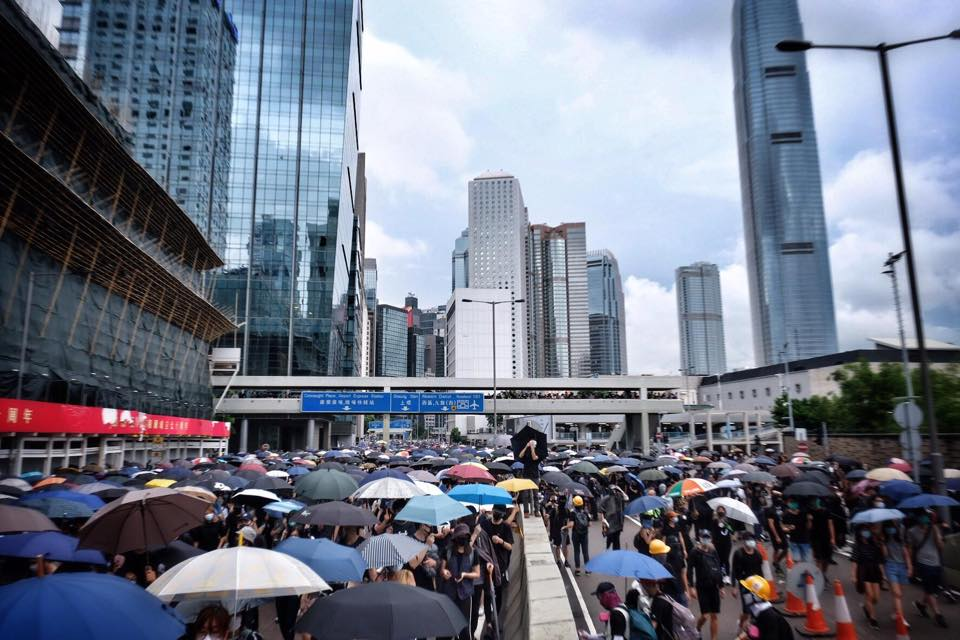
Protesters marching in the roads in Hong Kong Island

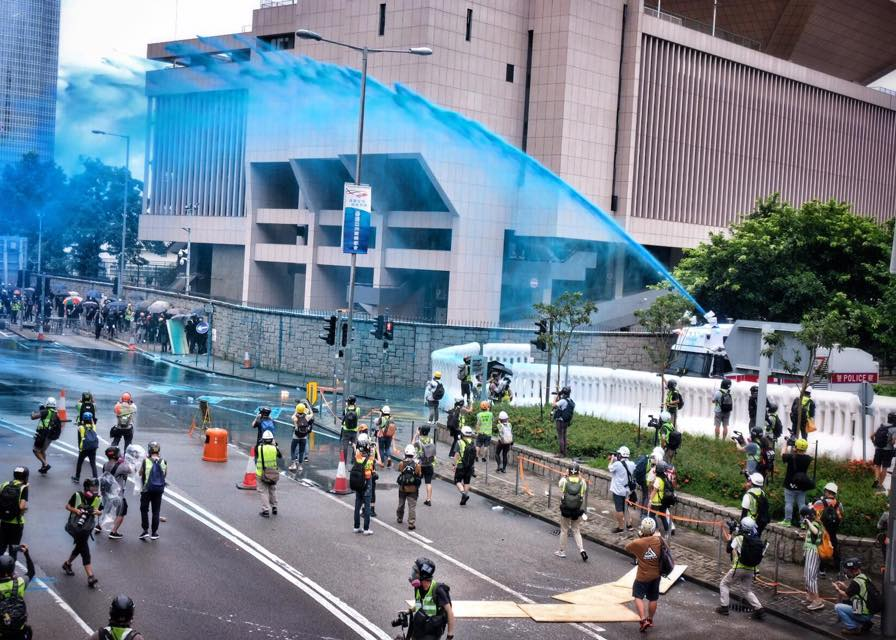
Police using blue-dye water canon to disperse and identify protesters

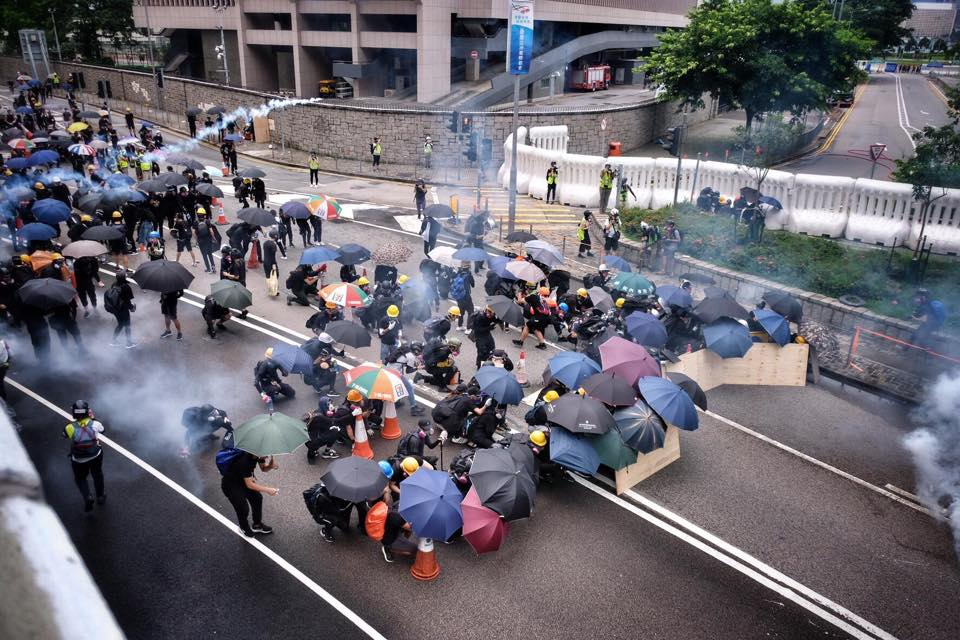
Protesters with umbrellas are being dispersed by tear gas.

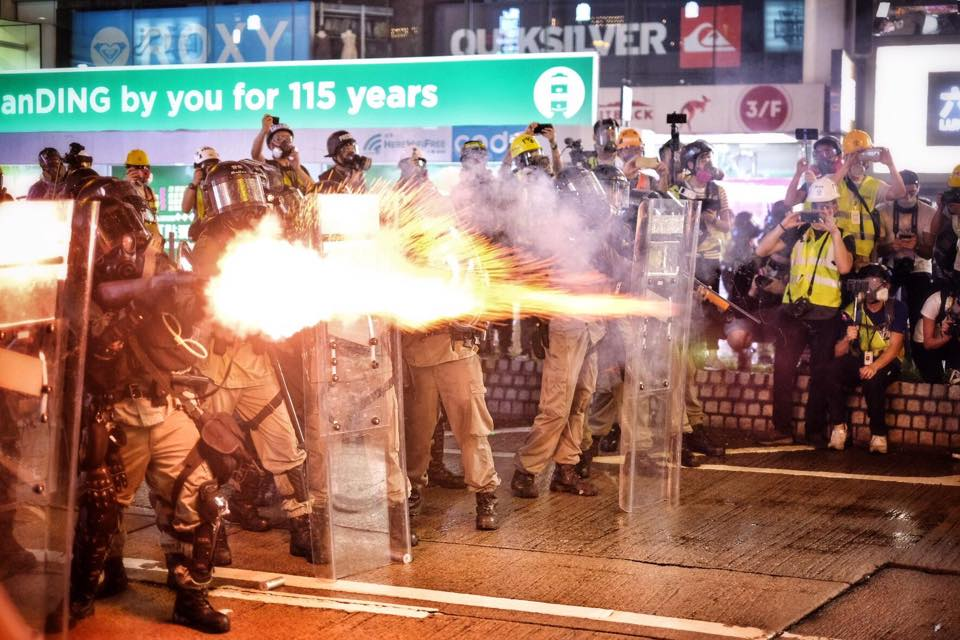
Police shooting tear gas canisters

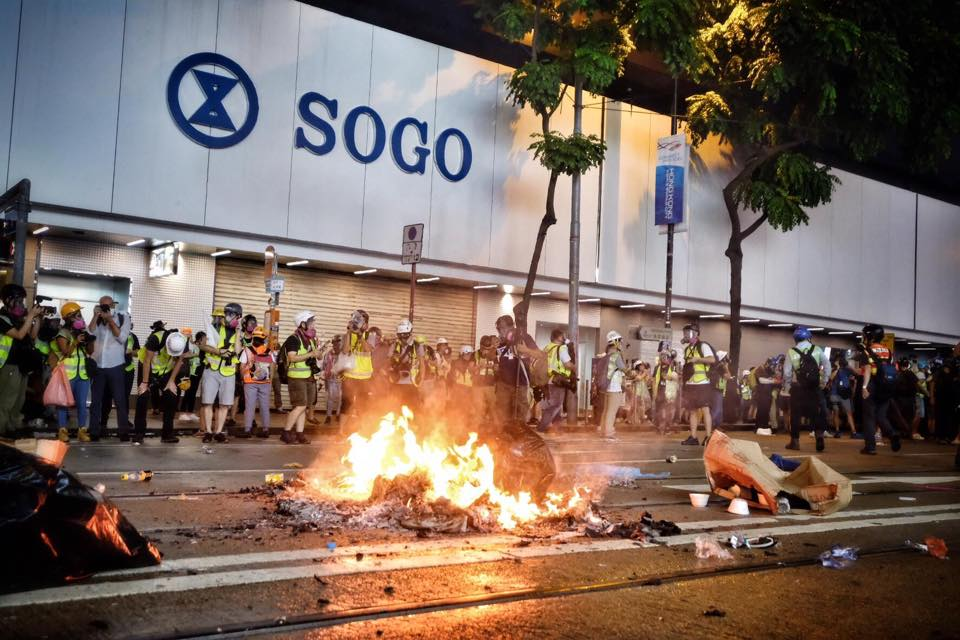
Fire created by protesters as a line of defence

== Counter-demonstrations ==
During the afternoon of 2 August, around 40 people from three pro-Beijing groups including New Millenarian, called for the sacking of any civil servants who will join the protest rally in the evening, stating those who join are violating the principle of political neutrality. Around 100 protesters gathered outside the US consulate general on 3 August to condemn alleged US interference in Hong Kong internal affairs. On the same day, another larger rally occurred in Victoria Park organised by Politihk Social Strategic. It called for an end to the violence and support for the Hong Kong Police, with Junius Ho taking stage to give speeches. While police estimated 26,000, the organisers claimed that 90,000 people took part in the event.

On 6 August, around 40 supporters from the DAB and Hong Kong Fujian Women Association held a rally outside Police HQ in Wan Chai to show support for the police in dealing with anti-government protesters. On 8 August, about 30 Pro-Beijing protesters gathered in Tsim Sha Tsui Star Ferry Pier, and demanded that those who threw the national flag into the sea be brought to justice for insulting the national flag and emblem. At the same time, 100 supporters from Politihk Social Strategic held a rally outside the Wan Chai Police headquarters, demanding the suspended extradition law bill to be resurrected and an inquiry into whether pro-democracy lawmakers have been instigating the recent protests, which they called "riots".

On 10 August, three pro-police rallies organised by Safeguard Hong Kong Alliance took place. Around 300 people gathered at Central Police Station in Sheung Wan to show their support, while 50 supporters gathered outside Kwun Tong Police Station and 245 people from the Hong Kong Fujian Association showed up in North Point. On 11 August, outside of Toronto in Markham, Ontario, Canada, a solidarity protest occurred in support for the Hong Kong Police, Hong Kong Government and the Chinese government, promoting the theme of 'Supporting Stable and Prosperous Peace, Hong Kong and China will be better tomorrow'.

On 14 August, dozens of protesters gathered outside the Hong Kong Journalists Association headquarters for their perceived lack of response to a Global Times reporter being beaten up at the Hong Kong Airport by anti-extradition bill protesters. However the Hong Kong Journalist Association did issue a statement expressing regrets that the mainland media reporters were blocked when they filmed the demonstrators and condemned the violence against journalists. To avoid any misunderstandings, journalists should to clearly display their press badges when interviewing large-scale demonstrations in Hong Kong to facilitate the public's identification. The public can also exercise their rights to decide whether to accept interviews and filming by relevant organisations. On 16 August, about 20 supporters from pro-police group Protect Hong Kong League urged the Hospital Authority to ban medical staff from wearing surgical masks at work. They claim that the use of surgical masks reminds the police of recent protesters, impeding police's enforcement of law and causing conflict inside government institutions.

On 17 August, a pro-government rally organised by the Safeguard Hong Kong Alliance occurred in Tamar Park. Organisers said 476,000 people including pro-government politicians and business leaders joined the demonstration, but police stated only 108,000 attended. Over the 16–18 August weekend, protests in support of China and the Hong Kong Police took place in Adelaide, Melbourne, Sydney, London, Paris, Vancouver, Toronto and Calgary.

On 24 August, a protest against RTHK's allegedly biased reporting took place outside RTHK headquarters in Kowloon Tong. The protest was organised by Politihk Social Strategic, which claimed 10,000 people were in attendance, while police stated only 1200 were present. They claimed RTHK engaged in biased reporting, and that it should represent the voice of the government as it is Hong Kong's public broadcaster. The protesters later engaged in scuffles with the media reporting the protest as they surrounded individual reporters and photographers, hitting cameras and throwing punches. The Hong Kong Press Photographers Association and Hong Kong Journalists Association condemned the violent behaviour of protesters during the rally. However no arrests were made. Politihk Social Strategic chairman Tang Tak-shing claimed that the journalists at the scene had provoked protesters.

On 28 August, around 50 people from the pro-Beijing group, Real Hongkongers' View held a rally outside HK government buildings in Admiralty. They called on the government to introduce a law banning face masks at protests, following the example of France, stating that violent protesters needed to stop hiding their identities with masks and be held responsible.

On 29 August, around 40 members from the DAB and HKFTU held a rally calling for the government to introduce an anti-mask law saying it would help end violent protests in the city. The DAB stated "overseas studies showed that people were more likely to take violent action when they were masked", while HKFTU stated the law will "stop the criminal acts of the extreme radicals, and to safeguard peace in society".
