= Mei Foo Ferry Pier =

Ferry pier in Hong Kong

Coordinates: 22.3341°N 114.1389°E

Mei Foo Ferry Pier (Chinese: 美孚碼頭) (1 May 1974 - 1984) was a ferry pier in Mei Foo Sun Chuen, Lai Chi Kok, Kowloon, Hong Kong, located outside Block 6 of the estate.

There was a ferry route that ran between Mei Foo and Central, operated by the Hongkong and Yaumati Ferry Company. The ferry service commenced on 1 May 1974. The service originally operated from the Mei Foo seawall, which was considered unsatisfactory (versus a proper pier) for safety reasons. After the MTR Tsuen Wan line started service in 1982, the route's patronage declined dramatically and the ferry operator applied to the government for the cancellation of the route. In 1984, the ferry route was cancelled. The pier was later demolished to make way for the reclamation of Lai Chi Kok Bay. The site has now become a part of Lai Chi Kok Park.

== See also ==
- List of demolished piers in Hong Kong
