= Port Rail Line =

Cancelled Hong Kong MTR railway line

The Port Rail Line was a proposed rail line in Hong Kong that is now scrapped. It was going to be a freight rail line linking Lo Wu and the Kwai Tsing Container Terminals.

== History ==
In the 1994 Railway Development Strategy, the line was planned to go from Kwai Tsing alongside the West Rail line through Kam Tin to Lo Wu where it would then cross the border. Space was also left for a possible port rail line that would link it to Lantau Island.

Six years later in the 2000 Railway Development Strategy, another scheme was put forward. In this scheme, the line would go from Kwai Tsing through Mei Foo to Tai Wai where it would connect alongside the East Rail line up to the border at Lo Wu. During construction of the West Rail line, a small tunnel was built inside Mei Foo station in preparation for the Port Rail Line.

On 16 October 2009, the Hong Kong government officially scrapped the project.
