= Lai Chi Kok Bridge =

Bridge in New Territories, Hong Kong

Lai Chi Kok Bridge 荔枝角大橋
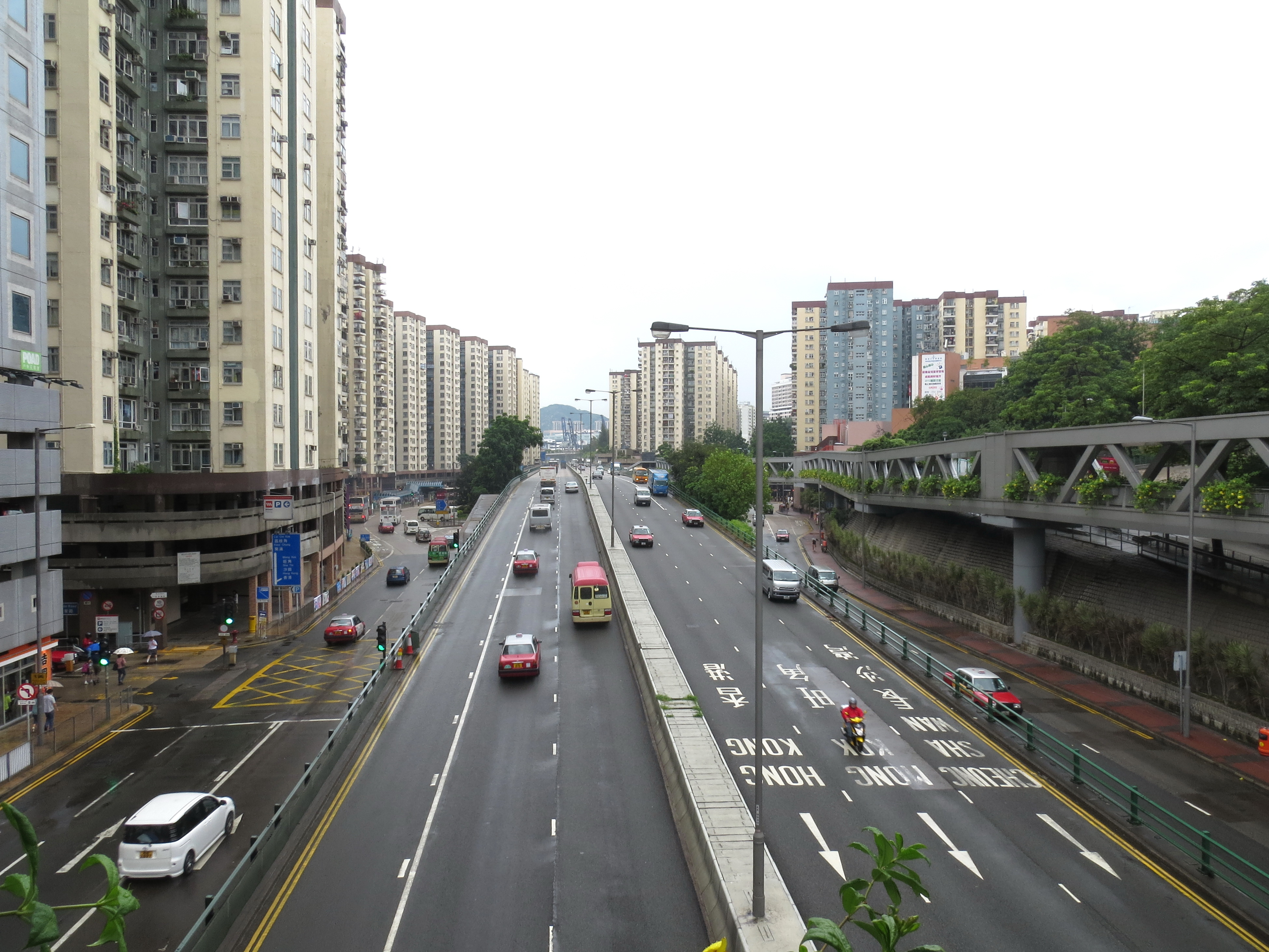
- Eastern end of the bridge
- Coordinates: 22.3374°N 114.1375°E
- Carries: Vehicles, pedestrians
- Locale: Lai Chi Kok, Hong Kong
- Owner: Hong Kong Government
- Maintained by: Highways Department

Characteristics
- Material: Concrete
- Total length: 2,600 feet (790 m)
- No. of spans: 29
- No. of lanes: 6

History
- Designer: Scott and Wilson, Kirkpatrick and Partners
- Constructed by: Paul Y. Construction
- Construction start: 1966; 59 years ago
- Construction cost: HK$13.5 million
- Inaugurated: 29 October 1968; 56 years ago

Statistics
- Daily traffic: 82,560 (2016)

Lai Chi Kok Bridge
- Traditional Chinese: 荔枝角大橋
Transcriptions
Yue: Cantonese
- Jyutping: Lai6 ji1 gok3 daai6 kiu4 ~y=Laih jī gok daaih kìuh

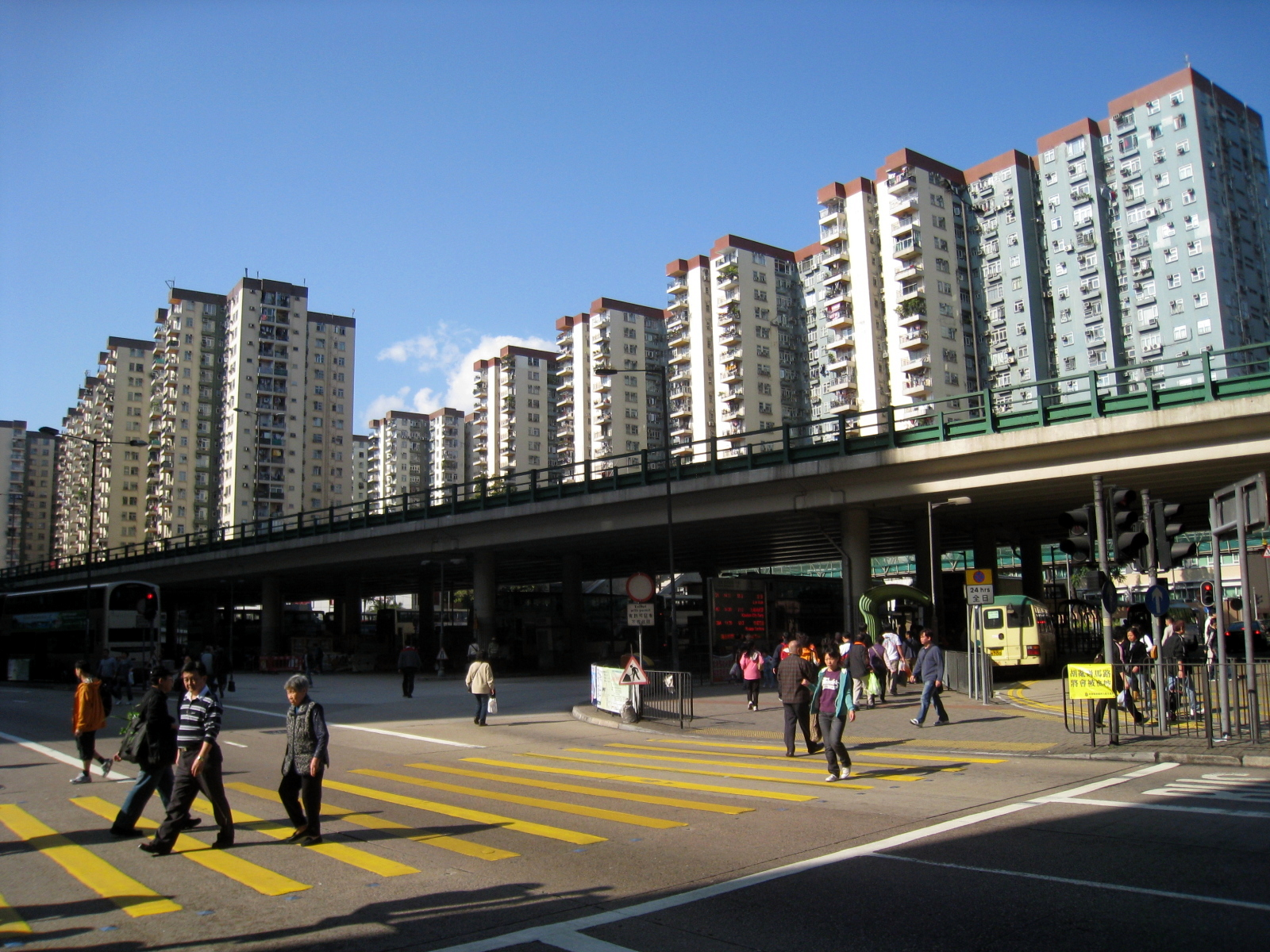
The Mei Foo Bus Terminus, below Lai Chi Kok Bridge

Lai Chi Kok Bridge is a Hong Kong bridge that carries the Kwai Chung Road, part of Route 5, linking Kowloon to Kwai Chung, New Territories.

The bridge, once the longest in Hong Kong, spanned Lai Chi Kok Bay, which was later filled in. It continues as an elevated road through Mei Foo Sun Chuen, a private housing estate. The former bay (below the bridge) is now Lai Chi Kok Park as well as Mei Foo station of the Mass Transit Railway (MTR).

== Nomenclature ==
The name is sometimes rendered as Laichikok Bridge in English. The Transport Department traffic census refers to it as the Lai Chi Kok Bay Bridge. It is also called the Kwai Chung Road Flyover in some government sources, but confusingly this name is also sometimes used to describe a different flyover farther west on Kwai Chung Road, close to Kwai Fong Estate.

== History ==
The bridge was built to link Kowloon with ongoing industrial and new town development in Tsuen Wan and Kwai Chung, providing an alternative to the older, congested Castle Peak Road. Construction began in 1966. Built at a cost of about HK$13.5 million, the new bridge, then Hong Kong's longest, was officially opened on 29 October 1968 by acting governor Michael David Irving Gass. Kwai Chung Road was built along the coastline to the west of the bridge at the same time in order to complete the new link to Kwai Chung.

Mei Foo Sun Chuen, a private housing estate with 99 residential blocks, was developed roughly at the same time. Lai Chi Kok Bridge continues through the estate as an elevated roadway. Various amenities were built under the bridge here, including the community's wet market, bus terminus, an open plaza, and a community centre.

In 1975, the Hong Kong Government announced plans to reclaim Lai Chi Kok Bay, providing a park on the new land to help resolve the scarcity of public recreational space in the area. It said the bay, popular with swimmers, was badly polluted and constituted a health hazard. The bay was subsequently filled in, meaning the bridge no longer spans any water and simply resembles an elevated road. The bridge required underpinning to contend with additional loading imposed by the new fill.

In the 1990s, the Urban Council developed the new land directly under the bridge as the Lai Chi Kok Park Stage II. From 1999 to 2003, an extension of Mei Foo station was constructed as part of the West Rail project, adding new railway platforms and a new ticketing concourse. These new structures were built directly below the Lai Chi Kok Bridge, causing the bridge to shift slightly.

== Design and construction ==
The bridge is a 2600-foot-long concrete structure with 29 spans. It was designed by Scott and Wilson, Kirkpatrick and Partners together with the former Public Works Department of the Hong Kong Government, and built by Paul Y. Construction.

== Traffic ==
The bridge deck carries three vehicular lanes in each direction. Part of the bridge (the part that spanned the former bay) also has pavements on both sides of the carriageway. There are two slip roads partway along the bridge – one allows eastbound traffic to exit onto Cheung Sha Wan Road, while the other allows westbound traffic to enter the bridge from Lai Chi Kok Road.

According to the Transport Department, the part of the bridge that spanned the bay (i.e. west of the slip roads) registered annual average daily traffic (AADT) of 82,740 in 2017.

== Noise ==
The bridge bisects Mei Foo Sun Chuen, and parts of the road pass very closely to residential blocks. As a result, some residents have long complained that the road constitutes a noise nuisance. In 2000, the Hong Kong Government announced a policy to implement noise reduction strategies at flyovers that pass close to buildings, including constructing acoustic barriers and resurfacing roads with "low-noise material". Under this policy, the Lai Chi Kok Bridge was resurfaced in the early 2000s. However, the government said that adding noise barriers was not feasible as the road structure cannot support the added weight. Further, it said that there was no space for a separate noise barrier structure, and the barriers would obstruct firefighting in the event of a fire.

== See also ==
- Transport in Hong Kong
