= Ching Cheung Road =

Road in Hong Kong

Coordinates: 22.3405°N 114.1474°E

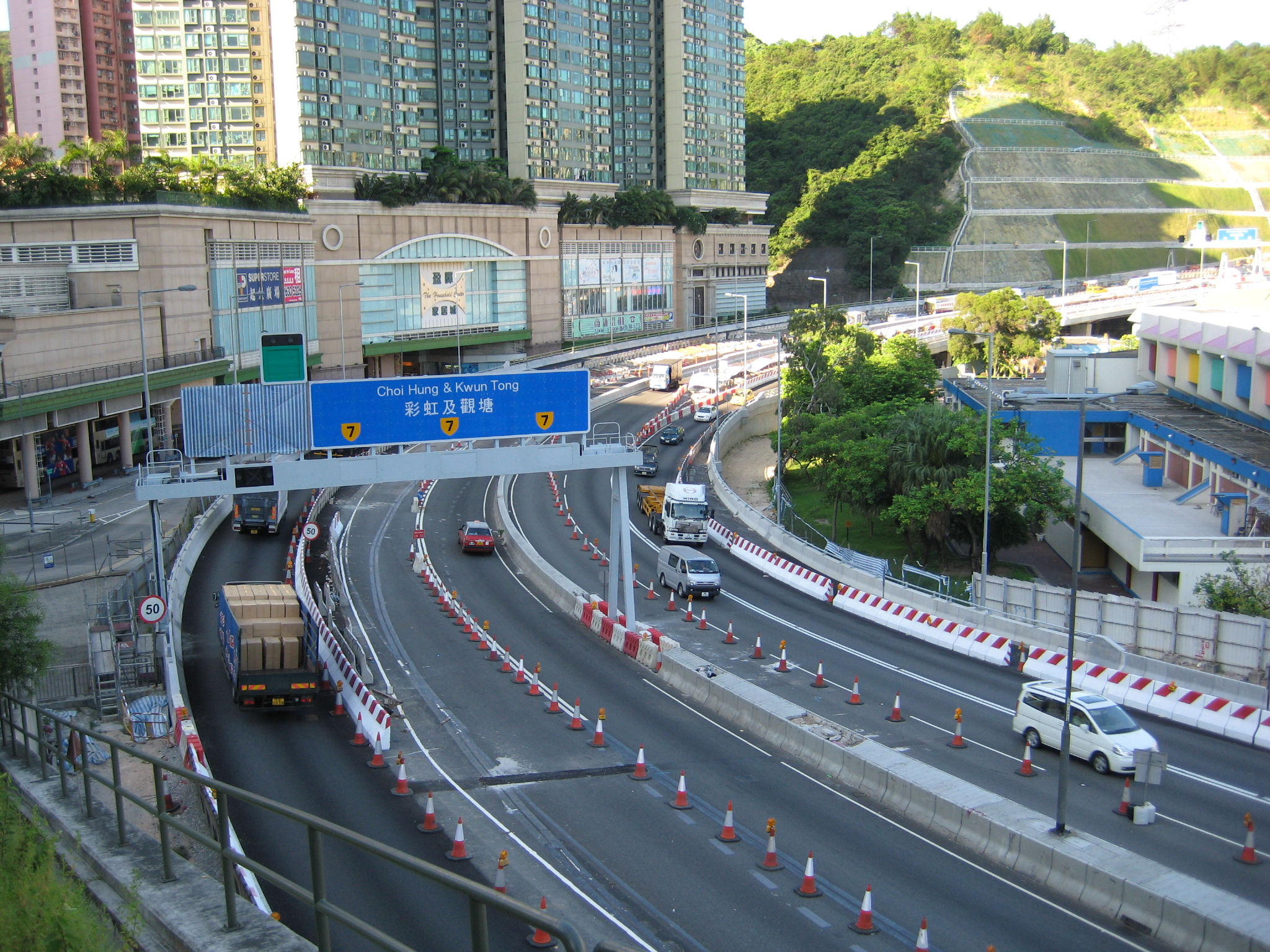
Ching Cheung Road.

Ching Cheung Road (Chinese: 呈祥道; Jyutping: ching4 cheung4 dou6), part of the Route 7, is a dual carriageway in New Kowloon, Hong Kong linking Lung Cheung Road and Tai Po Road near Tai Wo Ping and Kwai Chung Road of Route 5 near Lai Chi Kok, varying between 2+2 lanes and 3+4 lanes for its length. This road was named in honour of Sir David Trench, the Governor of Hong Kong when it was finished, and the road's name was derived from the connection of his Chinese name (戴麟趾) and the wishing phrase “麟趾呈祥” (Jyutping: lun4 zi2 cing4 coeng4).

Kwun Tong (connected by Lung Cheung Road and Kwun Tong Road) in eastern New Kowloon was the main manufacturing centre of Hong Kong during the 1960s. To provide a more efficient link to the container terminals near Kwai Chung and other industrial areas in western New Kowloon, two roads were built along the hillside in the north of developed New Kowloon. Ching Cheung Road is the western section of the route.

In 1997 it was closed for three weeks because of a major landslip during the passage of Severe Tropical Storm Victor across the territory.

There are three major junctions on this road, namely Kwai Chung Road, Butterfly Valley and Tai Po Road. The stretch of the road between St Raphael's Catholic Cemetery and Lai Wan Road forms the boundary between Sham Shui Po and Kwai Chung districts.

== See also ==
- List of streets and roads in Hong Kong § Kowloon and New Kowloon
