= Ching Lai Court =

Home Ownership Scheme housing estate in Hong Kong

Coordinates: 22.3390°N 114.1349°E

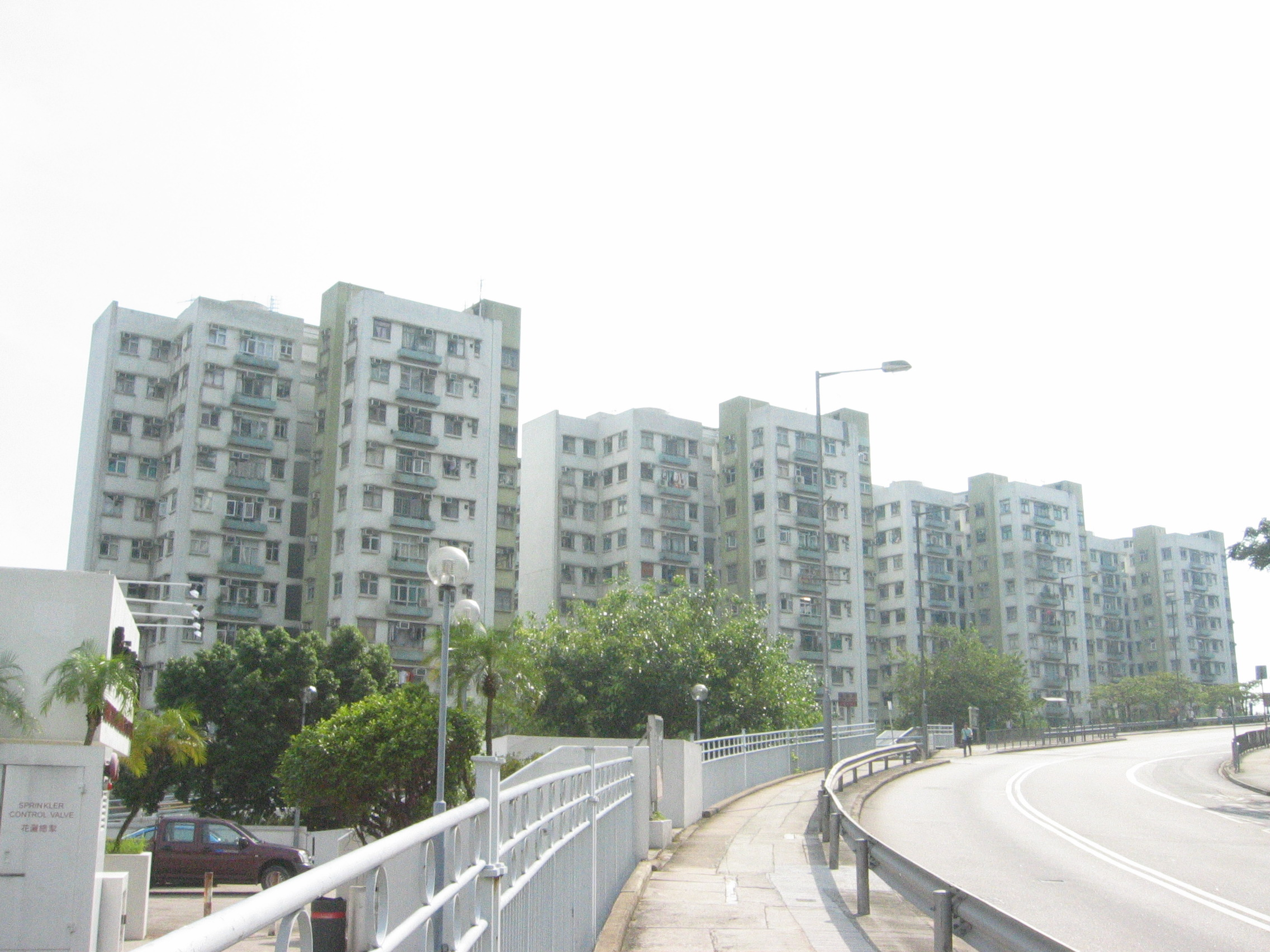
Ching Lai Court

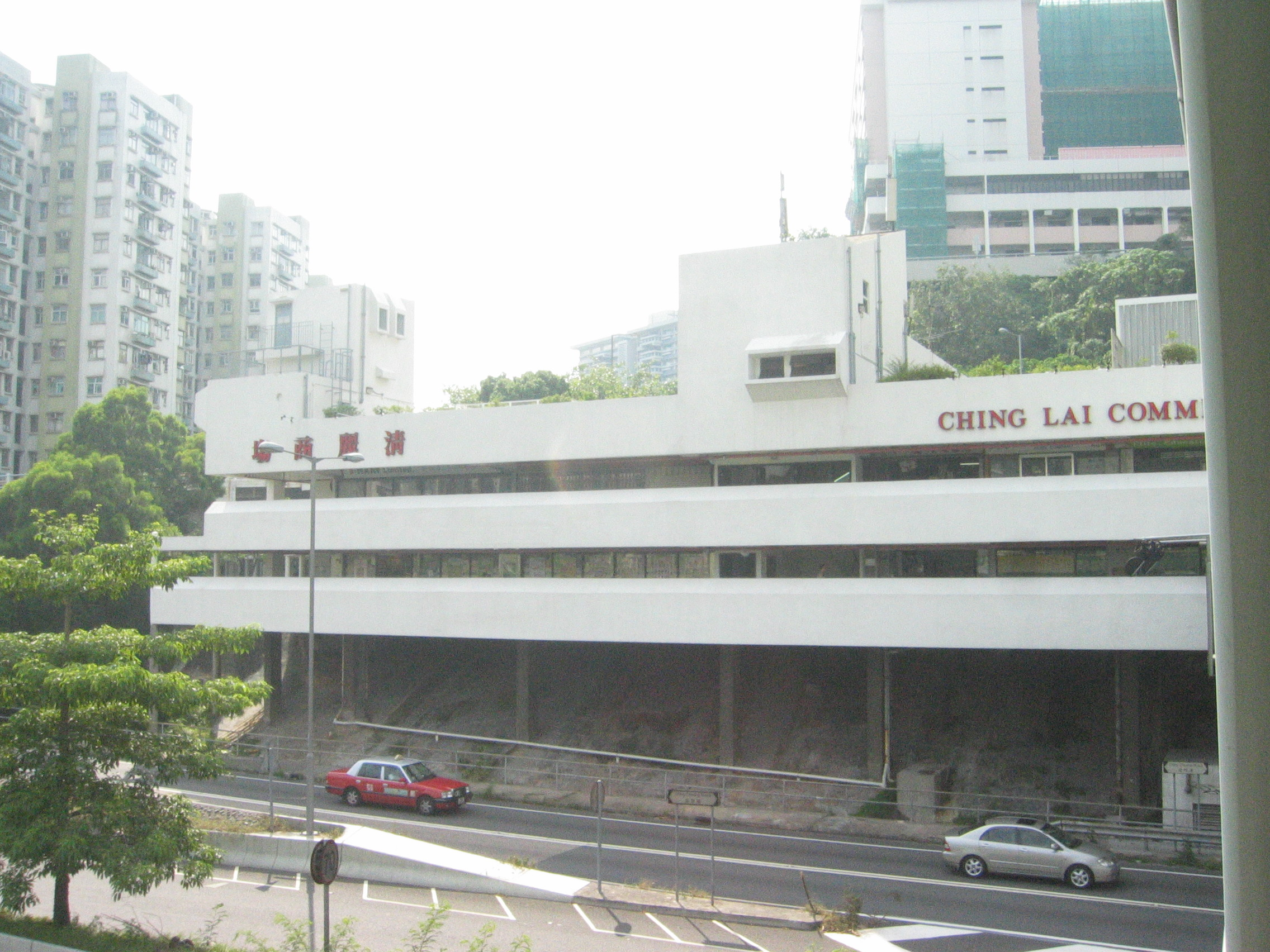
Ching Lai Shopping Centre

Ching Lai Court (Chinese: 清麗苑) is a Home Ownership Scheme court in Lai Chi Kok, Kowloon, Hong Kong, located at the junction of Ching Cheung Road and Kwai Chung Road near Princess Margaret Hospital. Although it is situated at the south of Kwai Chung, it administratively belongs to Sham Shui Po District. It has totally seven blocks and a shopping centre built in 1981.

== Houses ==
Name	Type	Completion
Lai Hang House	Non-Standard	1981
Lai Yue House	Non-Standard	1981
Lai Kin House	Non-Standard	1981
Lai Tai House	Non-Standard	1981
Lai Hong House	Non-Standard	1981
Lai Ning House	Non-Standard	1981
Lai Sau House	Non-Standard	1981
