= Scott Wilson Group =

Former engineering consultancy

Scott Wilson Group plc
- Type: Public limited company
- Industry: Support Services Consultancy (includes civil and structural engineering)
- Founded: 1951
- Defunct: 2010
- Fate: Acquired by URS Corporation
- Headquarters: London, England
- Revenue: £360 million (2009)
- Operating income: £10.7 million (2009)

Scott Wilson Group plc was a global integrated design and engineering consultancy with its headquarters in the United Kingdom. Founded as a civil engineering firm in 1951, the company broadened its range of services through acquisitions. Scott Wilson offered consultancy and professional services in the railways, buildings and infrastructure, environment and natural resources and roads sectors, and at its peak employed 5,500 people in 80 offices worldwide. Scott Wilson became a public limited company in 2006, and in 2010 was purchased by URS Corporation that in turn was purchased by AECOM.

== History ==
Sir Cyril Kirkpatrick (1872–1957) was Chief Engineer to the Port of London Authority from 1913 to 1924, when he established his own firm specialising in docks, harbours and sea defences. During World War II, Kirkpatrick advised on the construction of the concrete caissons which formed the Mulberry Harbour that facilitated the D-Day landings. In 1945 engineers William Scott and Dr Guthlac Wilson founded a partnership. Between them they were responsible for the design of the Chiswick and Twickenham Bridges over the River Thames in 1933, and the Royal Festival Hall in London. The two firms merged in 1951, forming Scott & Wilson, Kirkpatrick & Partners.

In the late 1960s, Scott Wilson Kirkpatrick & Partners was responsible for engineering works on the M6 motorway through the Lune Gorge in north-west England. Throughout the latter half of the 20th century, the firm continued to grow, largely through acquisitions. In August 1995, the company purchased two British Rail engineering design offices in Glasgow and Swindon during the privatisation of British Rail. Other acquisitions were in the fields of environmental consultancy, health and education property, power and mining, landscape design and engineering.

In 1997, the firm adopted the name Scott Wilson. One year later, it enacted job cuts in response to the 1997 Asian financial crisis.

On 15 March 2006, it was floated on the London Stock Exchange, reducing its debt pile in the process. Later that same year, the company resumed its acquisitive activities, and publicly declared its interest in acquiring property consultancies in particular. During 2007, it completed the acquisitions of both DCL Consulting Engineers and McLay Collier; annual profits also rose to £10 million that same yar. During 2008, the company completed multiple acquisitions, including of the Terrance Lee Partnership and Benaim Enterprise, the latter being in exchange for £5.5 million.

In early 2009, in response to the Great Recession, Scott Wilson enacted a salary freeze along with job cuts comprising 10 percent of its global workforce. That same year, the company secured a contract to redesign Farringdon Station for the Crossrail programme, as well as further work on the Mersey Barrage.

During the summer of 2010, a bidding war to purchase Scott Wilson Group broke out between two American engineering companies, CH2M and URS Corporation. In late June, URS Corporation announced that its offer of £161 million has secured the recommendation of Scott Wilson's board, after which CH2M submitted a higher offer of £189 million to buy Scott Wilson, which was in turn surpassed by URS's increased offer of £223 million. In early July, CH2M announced it would not place any further bids for the firm.

In early August, the majority of Scott Wilson's shareholders voted to accept URS Corporation offer, which valued the firm at £233 million. Accordingly, on 10 September 2010, URS Corporation completed its acquisition of Scott Wilson Group plc; consequently, the company was delisted from the London Stock Exchange. At the time of the acquisition, Scott Wilson Group had 5,500 employees in 80 offices, mainly located in the UK, Europe, India, the Asia-Pacific region, and the Middle East. The group's regional main offices were in London, Hong Kong, Warsaw, New Delhi, Bahrain and Dubai.

Initially, Scott Wilson was rebranded as URS-Scott Wilson, however, in early 2012, the Scott Wilson name was dropped in the UK, Ireland, Europe and the Middle East, as well as in India during the following year.

== Projects ==
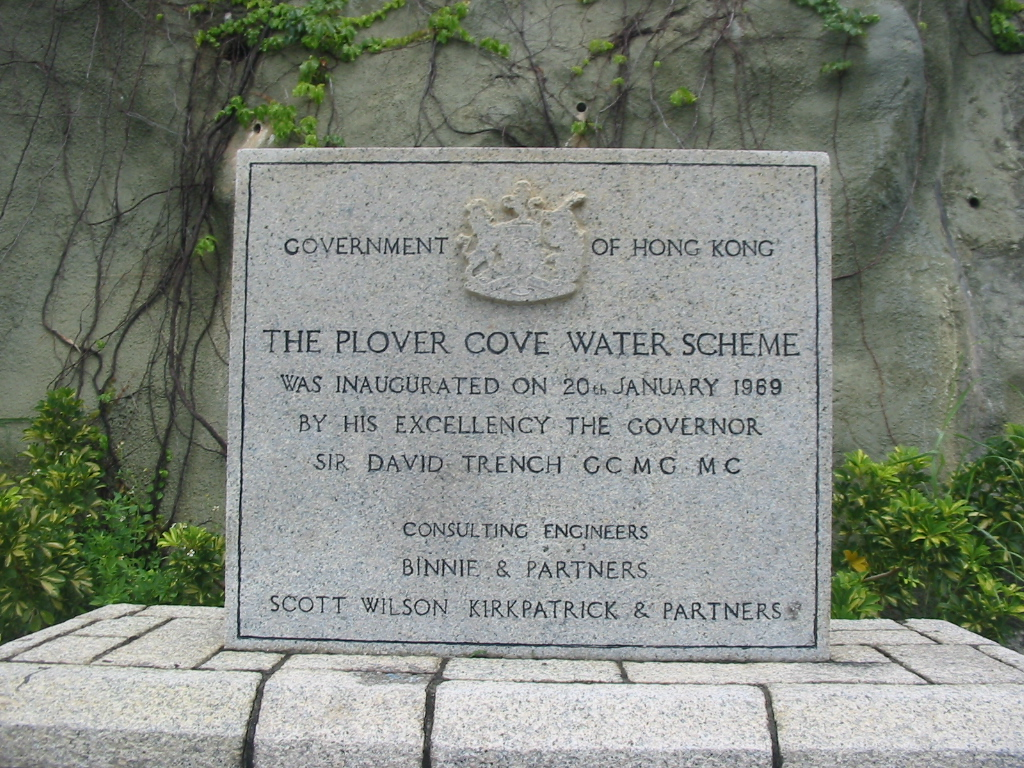
Inauguration plaque at Plover Cove Reservoir

Scott Wilson Group was involved in a large number of high-profile engineering projects worldwide.

- Crossrail, London, UK
- Combe Down Mine Stabilisation, Somerset, UK
- Spinnaker Tower, Portsmouth, UK
- Eden Project, Cornwall, UK
- Waverley Line reopening, Scotland, UK
- S69 Expressway, Poland
- A3 (Central Greece) and A5 (Ionia Odos) motorways, Greece
- Sheremetyevo Airport Masterplan, Russia
- Erbil International Airport, Iraq
- Delhi Mumbai Industrial Corridor, India
- Colombo Port expansion, Sri Lanka
- Wuxi Integrated Transportation Hub, China
- Nam Theun 2 Dam hydroelectric project, Laos
- Brunei International Airport, Brunei
- Interstate 595 improvements, Florida, USA
- Napier Mole Road Bridge (Jinnah Bridge), Karachi

Hong Kong

- Airport Core Programme (ACP), Hong Kong
- Cross-Harbour Tunnel, Hong Kong
- Kai Tak Airport, Hong Kong
- Lai Chi Kok Bridge, Hong Kong
- Liu To Bridge Hong Kong
- MTR South Island line, Hong Kong
- Plover Cove Reservoir, Hong Kong
- Tsing Yi North Bridge, Hong Kong
- Tsuen Wan New Town, Hong Kong
- Tuen Mun New Town, Hong Kong
- Tuen Mun Road, Hong Kong
