= Mei Foo station =

MTR interchange station in Kowloon, Hong Kong

Mei Foo 美孚
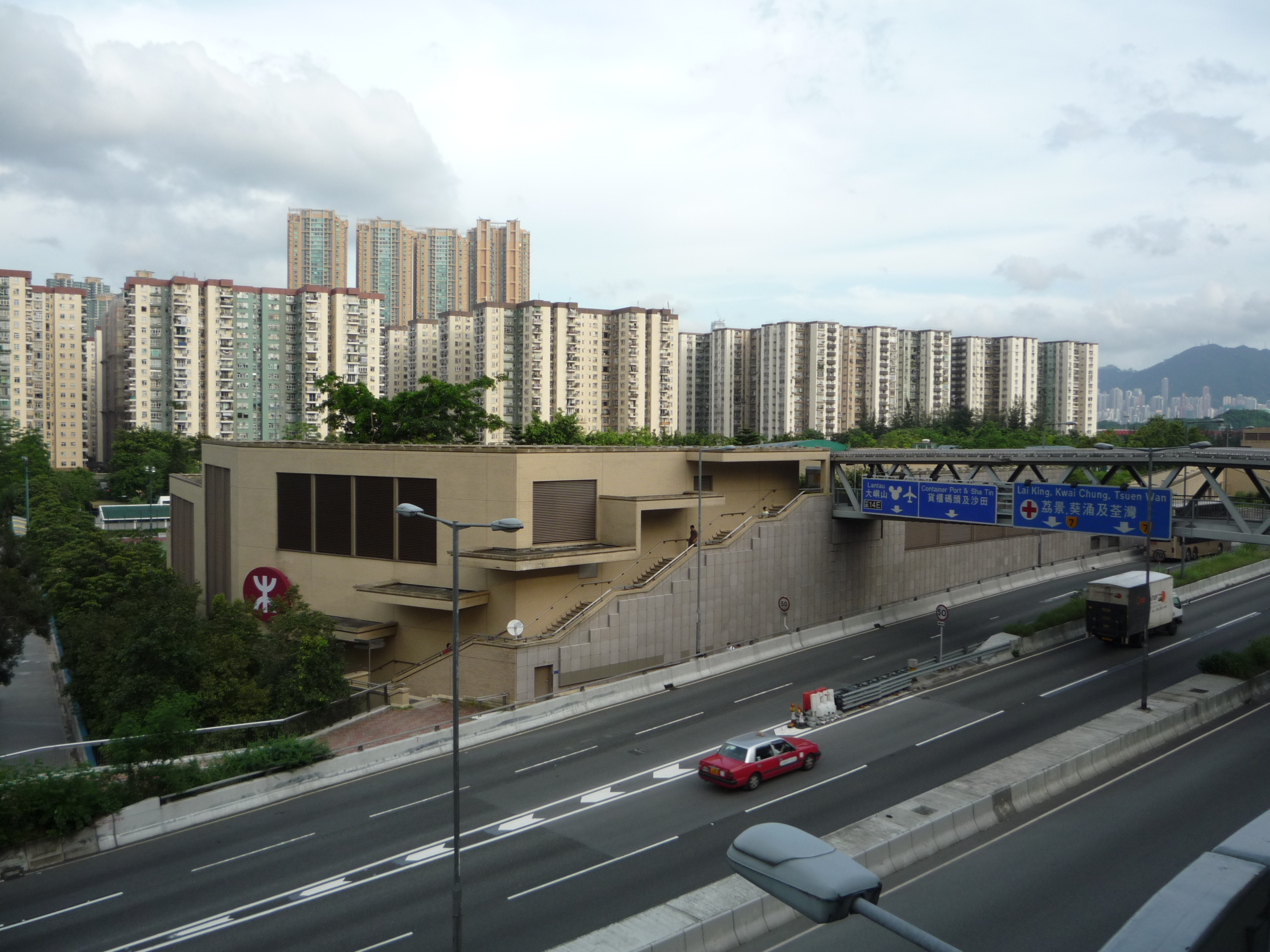
- Station exterior (Tuen Ma line building near exit G)

Chinese name
- Chinese: 美孚
- Cantonese Yale: Méih fū
- Literal meaning: Gracious Confidence
Transcriptions
Standard Mandarin
- Hanyu Pinyin: Měifú
Yue: Cantonese
- Yale Romanization: Méih fū
- Jyutping: Mei5 fu1

General information
- Location: Tsuen Wan line : Mount Sterling, Mei Foo Sun Chuen, Lai Chi Kok, Tuen Ma line : Lai Chi Kok Park, Lai Chi Kok, Sham Shui Po District; Hong Kong
- Coordinates: 22°20′17″N 114°08′15″E
- System: MTR rapid transit station
- Owner: Tsuen Wan line : MTR Corporation; Tuen Ma line : Kowloon-Canton Railway Corporation
- Operator: MTR Corporation
- Lines: Tsuen Wan line; Tuen Ma line; West Rail line (Until 27 June 2021)
- Platforms: 4; Tsuen Wan line (1 island platform); Tuen Ma line (2 side platforms)
- Tracks: 4
- Connections: Bus, minibus

Construction
- Structure type: Tsuen Wan line : Underground; Tuen Ma line : Ground, covered and sealed
- Accessible: Yes
- Architect: Mass Transit Railway Corporation (Tsuen Wan Line station); Aedas (then known as Liang Peddle Thorp Architects & Planners) and Hong Kong Government city planners (West Rail/Tuen Ma Line station)

Other information
- Station code: MEF

History
- Opened: Tsuen Wan line : 17 May 1982; 44 years ago; West Rail line : 20 December 2003; 22 years ago
- Electrified: Tsuen Wan line : 1,500 V DC (Overhead line); West Rail line : 25 kV 50 Hz AC (Overhead line)
- Former names: Lai Wan

Services
Preceding station	MTR	Following station
Lai Chi Kok towards Central	Tsuen Wan line	Lai King towards Tsuen Wan
Tsuen Wan West towards Tuen Mun	Tuen Ma line	Nam Cheong towards Wu Kai Sha
Track layout
Location
- Location within MTR

Mei Foo station

Former name (1982-1985)
- Traditional Chinese: 荔灣
- Simplified Chinese: 荔湾
- Literal meaning: Lychee bay
Transcriptions
Standard Mandarin
- Hanyu Pinyin: Lìwān
Yue: Cantonese
- Yale Romanization: Laih wāan
- Jyutping: Lai6 waan1

Mei Foo (Chinese: 美孚) (formerly named Lai Wan until 31 May 1985) is an MTR station on the Tsuen Wan Line and the Tuen Ma line. It is located under Mei Foo Sun Chuen, Lai Chi Kok, New Kowloon in Hong Kong. When not counting the out-of-system transfer between Tsim Sha Tsui and East Tsim Sha Tsui stations, Mei Foo is the only interchange station between those two lines. The station is situated between Lai Chi Kok and Lai King stations on the Tsuen Wan Line and Nam Cheong and Tsuen Wan West stations on the Tuen Ma Line. Opened on 17 May 1982, Mei Foo station's colour scheme is blue, but white for the Tuen Ma Line.

The Tsuen Wan Line part of the station is a simple through station with a central island platform, located under Mount Sterling Mall, a pedestrian-only street between the rows of residential buildings in the Mei Foo Sun Chuen housing estate. The station is designed to facilitate the transport needs of the residents of Mei Foo Sun Chuen housing estate, consisting of 132 buildings and several schools, and the point of transfer between the Kowloon urban area and the new town of Tsuen Wan. If there is heavy traffic on Kwai Chung Road, the main road into urban Kowloon, many commuters transfer from buses to trains here to continue to Kowloon and Central on Hong Kong Island.

== History ==
=== Tsuen Wan Line ===
The station's original name was Lai Chi Kok during the planning stage, but upon its opening on 17 May 1982 the station was called "Lai Wan" (荔灣, short for Lai Chi Kok Bay), and was renamed to its current name on 31 May 1985 when the Island line opened. Kumagai Gumi was the contractor for the station's construction.

=== West Rail line and now, the Tuen Ma Line ===
The West Rail line (then known as KCR West Rail) part of the station opened on 20 December 2003 along with the rest of the line. That section is located in the middle of Lai Chi Kok Park, slightly to the west of the Tsuen Wan Line section of the station. The contract for the station on the West Rail Line (now Tuen Ma Line) was awarded to Kier-Zen Pacific joint venture. The Tsuen Wan line and West Rail line stations merged into one station on 2 December 2007 in the MTR–KCR merger.

On 27 June 2021, the West Rail line officially merged with the Ma On Shan line (which was already extended into the Tuen Ma Line Phase 1 at the time) in East Kowloon to form the new Tuen Ma line, as part of the Shatin to Central link project. Mei Foo became an intermediate station on the Tuen Ma Line.

== Station layout ==
Both Tsuen Wan Line platforms share the same island platform. Unlike at Nam Cheong station (where there is one cross-platform interchange between the Tung Chung line and the Tuen Ma Line), the Tsuen Wan line and Tuen Ma line platforms are relatively far apart. The concourses for these platforms are a five to ten-minute walk along a connecting passageway.

Although the Tuen Ma Line platform is constructed at ground level, the station and surrounding track is covered to avoid disturbance to the nearby park.

U1	roof garden	Exit G, Lai Chi Kok Park, footbridge to Ching Lai Court, Lai King Hill Road
C / G	Tuen Ma Line concourse	Exit F, customer services, washrooms, shops, vending machines, automatic teller machines
P / L1	side platform
P / L1	Platform 1	Tuen Ma line towards Tuen Mun (Tsuen Wan West)
P / L1	Platform 2	Tuen Ma Line towards Wu Kai Sha (Nam Cheong)
P / L1	side platform
G	passageway	Exit D, Lai Chi Kok Park
G	Tsuen Wan Line concourse	Exits A, B, C, E
L1	subway	passageway connecting Tuen Ma Line and Tsuen Wan Line concourses
L2	Tsuen Wan Line concourse	customer service centre, shops, vending machine, automatic teller machines, Octopus promotion machine
L3	Platform 3	Tsuen Wan line towards Tsuen Wan (Lai King)
L3	island platform
L3	Platform 4	Tsuen Wan Line towards Central (Lai Chi Kok)

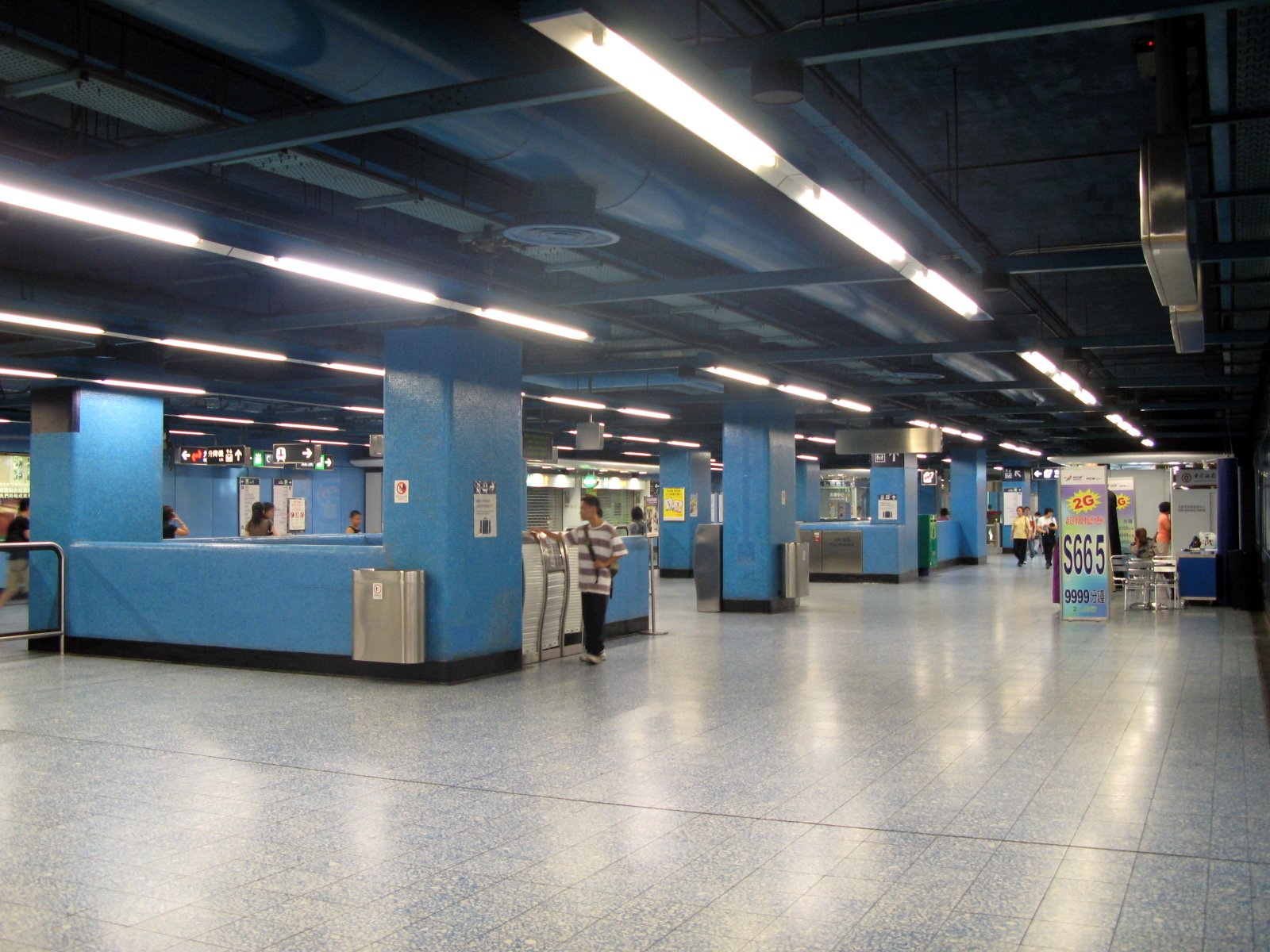
Tsuen Wan Line concourse

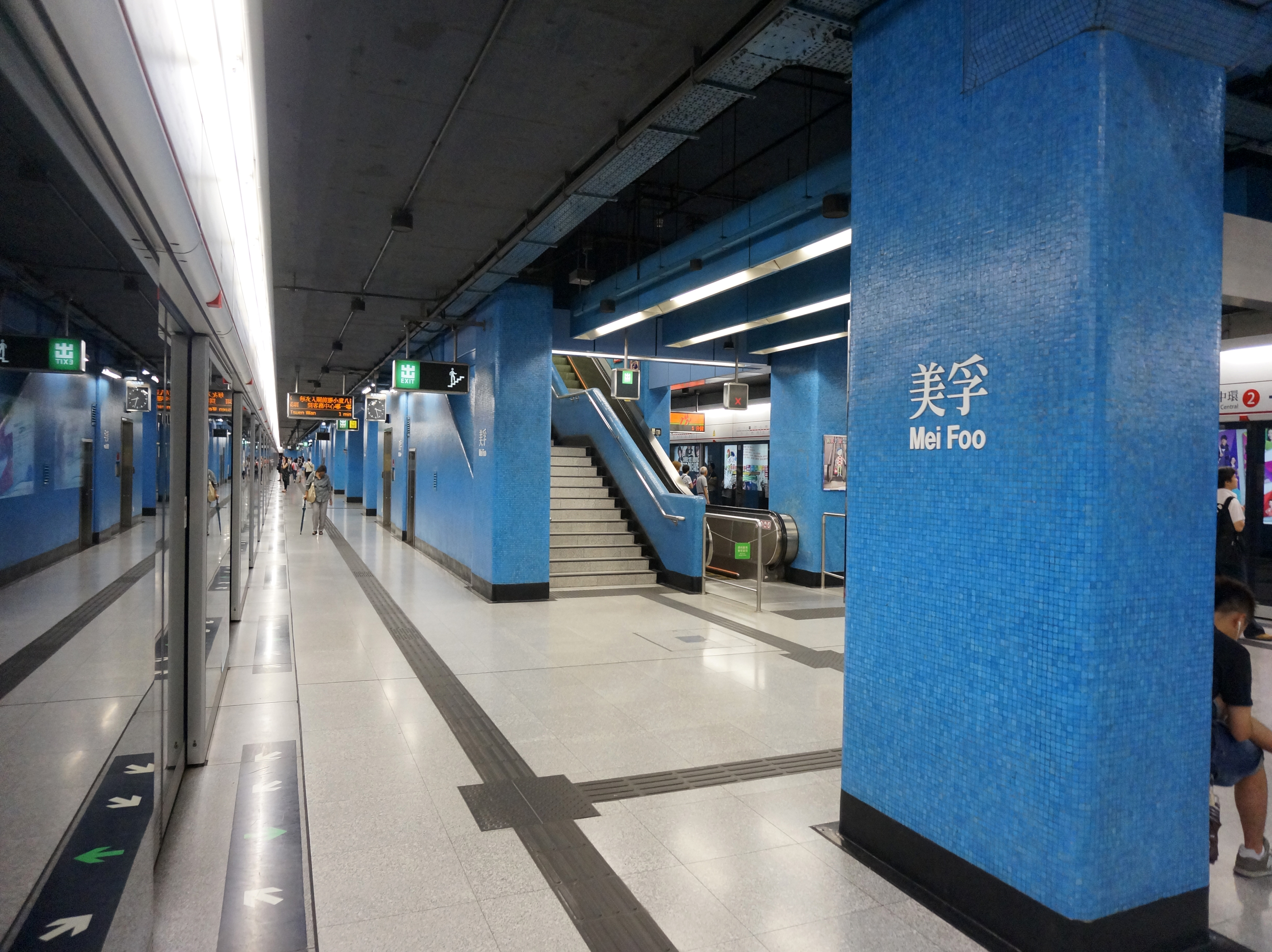
Tsuen Wan Line platform

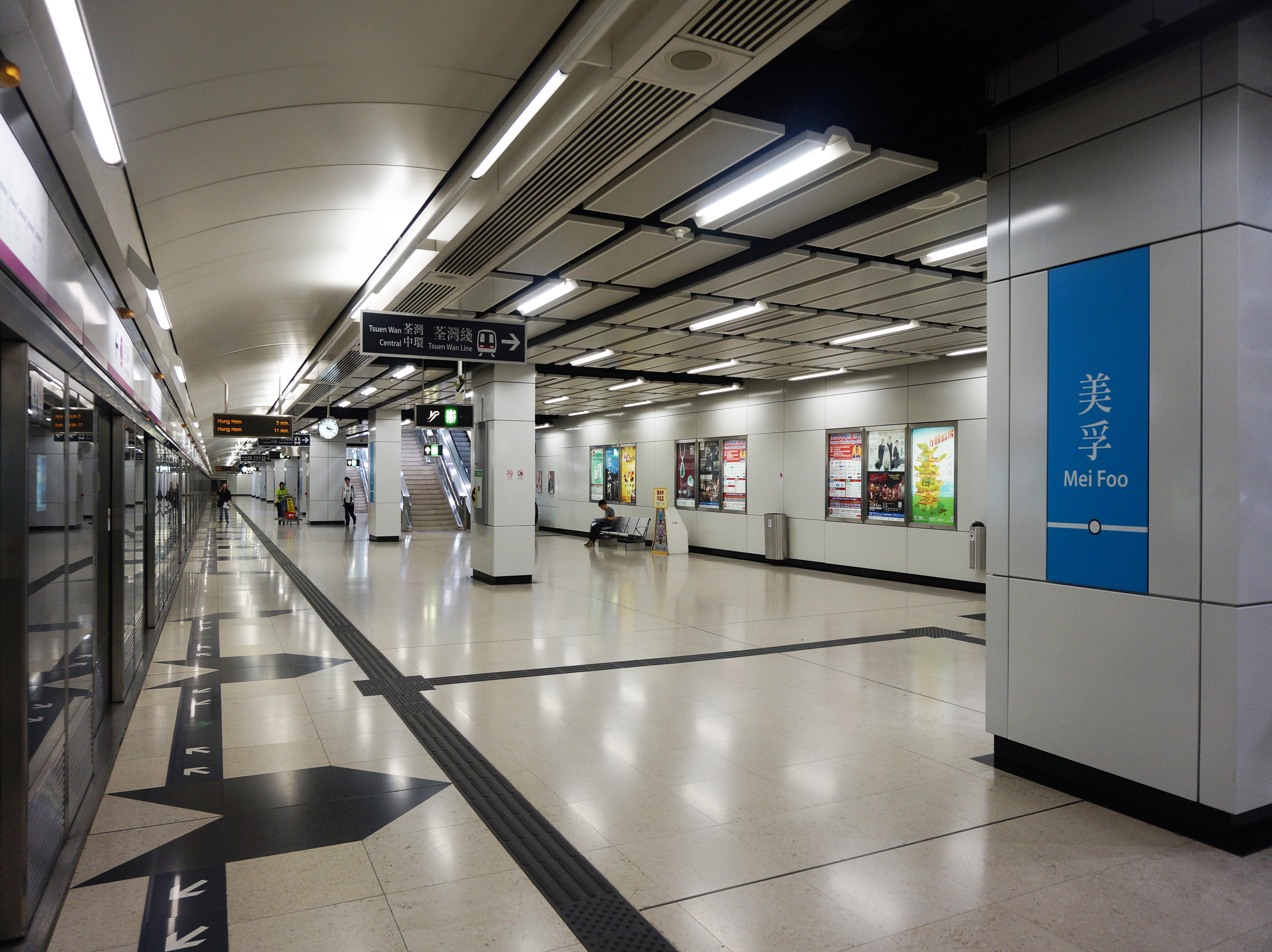
Tuen Ma Line platform

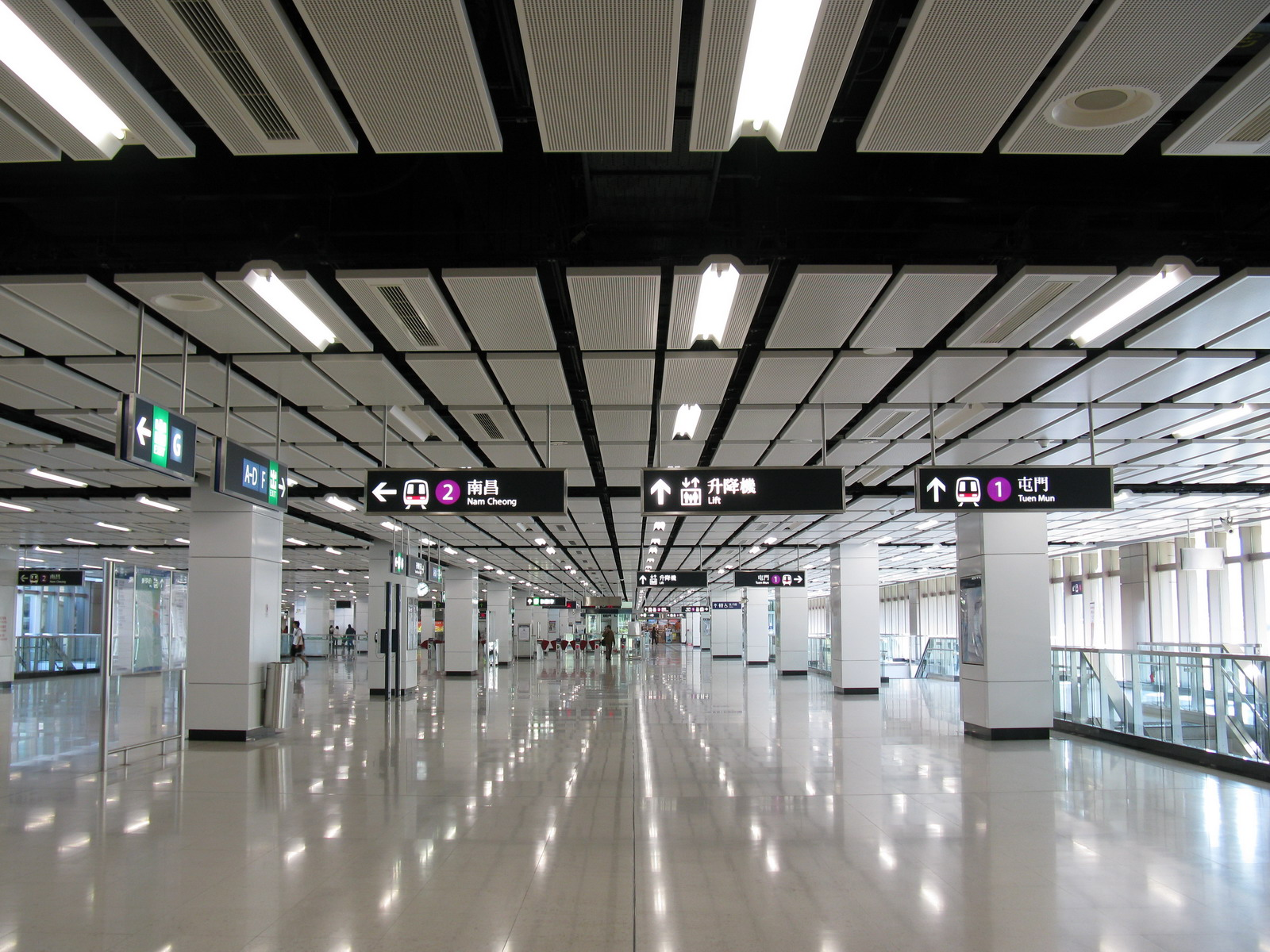
Tuen Ma Line concourse (when it was still part of the West Rail line)

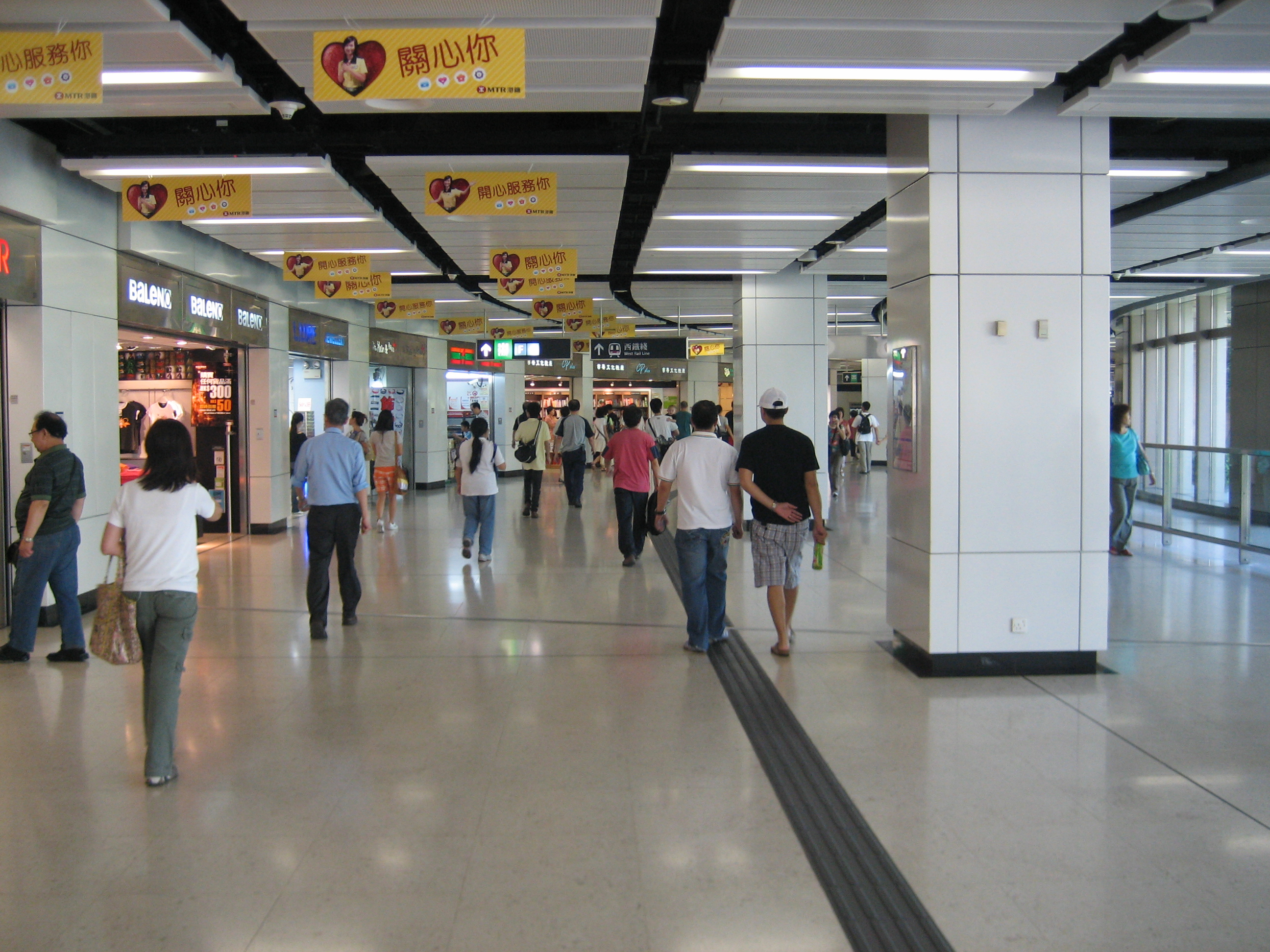
Interchange passageway

== Entrances/exits ==
- A: Broadway
- B: Mount Sterling Mall
- C1: Lai Wan Road
- C2: Humbert Street
- D: Lai Chi Kok Park (Lai Wan Road)
- E: Lai Wan Road
- F: Lai Chi Kok Park
- G: Lai King Hill Road
