= Paul Y. Engineering =

Hong Kong construction company

- Type: Public
- Industry: Construction
- Founded: 1946; 80 years ago in Shanghai
- Founder: Paul Y. Tso
- Headquarters: Kwun Tong, Hong Kong
- Website: pyengineering.com

Paul Y. Engineering (Chinese: 保華建業集團) is a Hong Kong construction and civil engineering company.

== History ==
The company was founded by Paul Yung Tso (1904 – 1978), after whom the company was named, in Shanghai in 1946. It moved to Hong Kong in 1949 due to the Chinese Communist Revolution. It was incorporated in Hong Kong as a private limited company on 27 May 1960.

A Singapore office was established in 1953. The company built the Merdeka Bridge, opened in 1956.

In 1970, Paul Y. went public on the Hong Kong Stock Exchange.

Paul Y. Holdings was acquired by International Tak Cheung Holdings in 1991. The name of the company was changed to Paul Y. – ITC Construction. The name of the company was changed to Paul Y. Engineering Group in 2005.

In 2011, Paul Y. Incorporated in Singapore as Paul Y. Construction & Engineering Pte. Ltd, and started embarking on Condominium and Hotel Building Projects.

In June 2024, Paul Y. Engineering Group Limited was among ten companies to receive the BCI Asia Top 10 Contractors Award.

== Notable projects ==
- Merdeka Bridge, Singapore (1956)
- Former Chartered Bank Headquarters, Central, Hong Kong (1959)
- Lai Chi Kok Bridge, Lai Chi Kok, Hong Kong (1968)
- Cross-Harbour Tunnel, Hong Kong (1972)
- Kai Tak Airport runway extension (1974)
- Central–Mid-Levels escalator, Central, Hong Kong (1993)
- Ting Kau Bridge, New Territories, Hong Kong (1998)
- Cheung Kong Centre, Central, Hong Kong (1999) – with Downer Group
- Tung Chung East Station, Hong Kong (2029) – with CRCC
