= Mei Foo Sun Chuen =

Housing estate in Lai Chi Kok, Hong Kong

Coordinates: 22.3380°N 114.1390°E

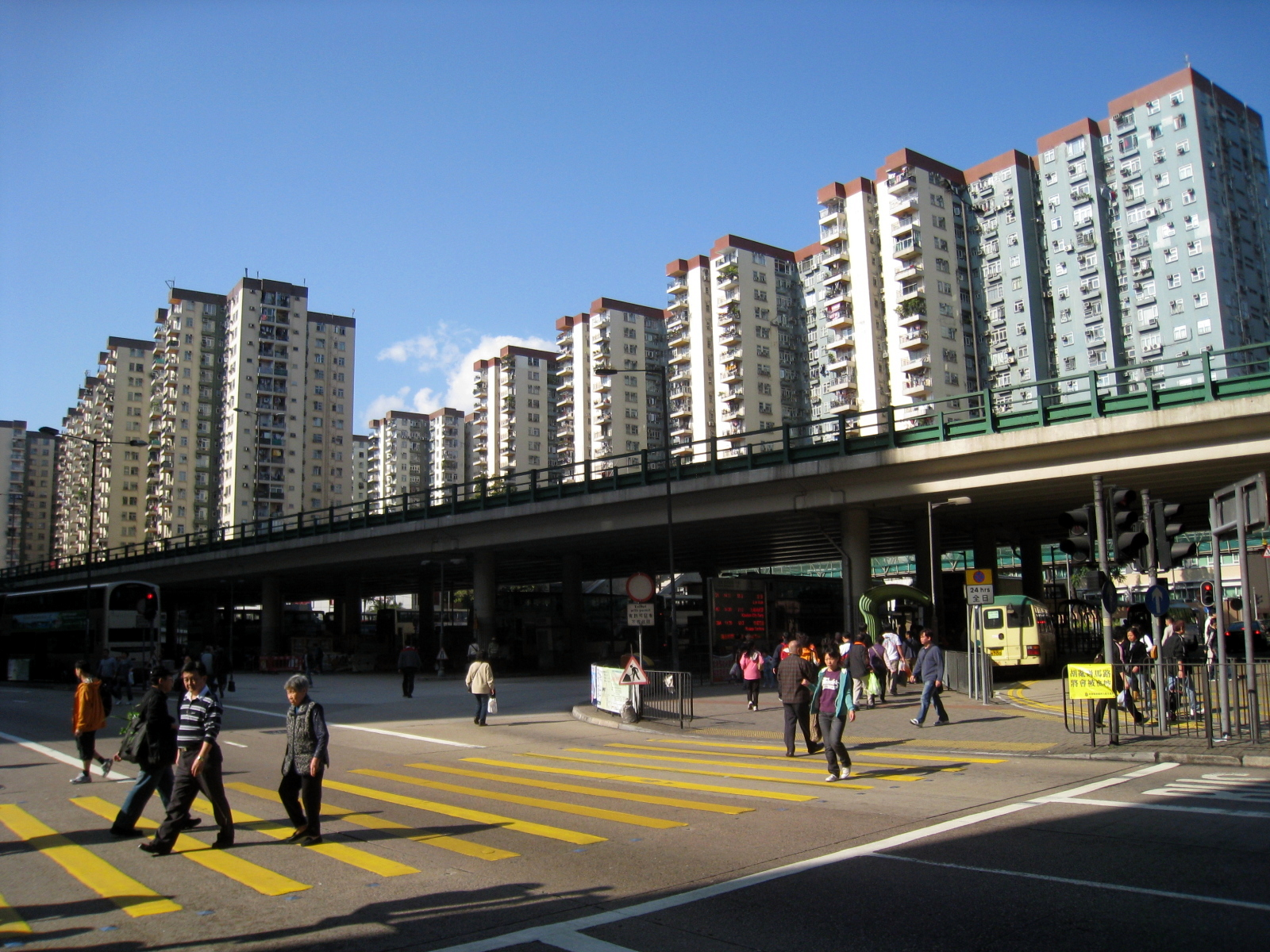
- Regular blocks of Mei Foo Sun Chuen
- Chinese: 美孚新邨
- Literal meaning: Mobil New Estate
Transcriptions
Standard Mandarin
- Hanyu Pinyin: Měifú Xīncūn
Yue: Cantonese
- Yale Romanization: Méih fū sān chyūn
- Jyutping: Mei5 fu1 san1 cyun1

Map of Mei Foo Sun Chuen

Mei Foo Sun Chuen or simply Mei Foo is a large private housing estate in Lai Chi Kok, Kowloon, Hong Kong. Mei Foo Sun Chuen was the first large scale private housing estate in Hong Kong and at the time of completion, the 99-tower complex was considered the largest private housing development in the world, accommodating some 70,000 – 80,000 people in 13,521 apartments. It is considered to be one of the world's largest privately financed residential condominium projects.

== History ==
The 40-acre Mei Foo Sun Chuen, with a total of ninety-nine blocks, was completed from 1968 to 1978 in eight separate but interconnected stages. It is located on the reclamation that had been a large petroleum-storage facility of Mobil (now part of ExxonMobil) in Hong Kong (Mobil's Chinese trading name in Hong Kong is 美孚; Mei Foo) from the 1920s. The redevelopment was carried out by Mei Foo Investments Limited, a subsidiary company of Mobil Oil (Hong Kong) Limited. The name, Mobil, was translated into 無比 (mou ^{4} bei^{2}) before the Sun Chuen (Estate) completed.

Mei Foo Sun Chuen was conceived to meet the housing needs of Hong Kong's middle-income families, an emerging and growing group at the time. At the time, a flat in Mei Foo cost around HK$40,000.

When built, the estate was adjacent to the sea and to Lai Chi Kok Bay, with a waterfront walkway and flats with waterfront balconies. However, this changed due to the West Kowloon reclamation scheme (starting in 1990) and the estate now borders Lai Chi Kok Park.

== Buildings ==
The residential complexes of Mei Foo were considered very affluent for the standards at the time they were built; every flat offers a balcony, at least two rooms and one bathroom. The apartment sizes vary from 600–1,800 square feet (56–167 m^{2}). Every apartment complex has a 24-hour uniformed, unarmed security force. Entry to a residential block requires a key card.

Mei Foo Sun Chuen has several schools, medical clinics, beauty salons, newspaper kiosks, supermarkets, shopping arcades, restaurants and food markets within its vicinity, making the area very convenient for residents. The private secondary schools in particular were notable for academically poor students. However, some schools have evolved into multicultural ones.

The once largest owners' corporation with legal status in Hong Kong, the Incorporated Owners of Mei Foo Sun Chuen – Stage I, was formed in 1997. The founder of the corporation, Yiu Chi-Wai, served as the Chairman of the Management Committee from 1997 to 2000. The other seven stages' owners' corporations were also formed during the period.

== Demographics ==
In the 2016 by-census, the population of Mei Foo Sun Chuen was recorded as 37,303. The median age of the estate's residents was 42.7.

== Transport ==
Mei Foo is on the crossroad between Kowloon and Tsuen Wan. It is also considered part of the west border of urban Kowloon. Kwai Chung Road and Lai Chi Kok Bridge are the major roads in the area. A major bus terminus is located under the Kwai Chung Road underpass. serving as a terminus for multiple bus routes. The MTR rapid transit railway services Mei Foo station is connected to the Tsuen Wan line, completed in 1982, and to the Tuen Ma Line, operational since 2003. Alternate forms of public transport like minibuses and taxis also service the estate.

In 2009, the new Route 8 tunnels opened near Mei Foo, providing a much more direct road link to the eastern New Territories.

== Events ==
- DBS Bank safe deposit box destruction incident (2 October 2004)

== Gallery ==
A collection of photos pertaining to Mei Foo Sun Chuen is shown below:

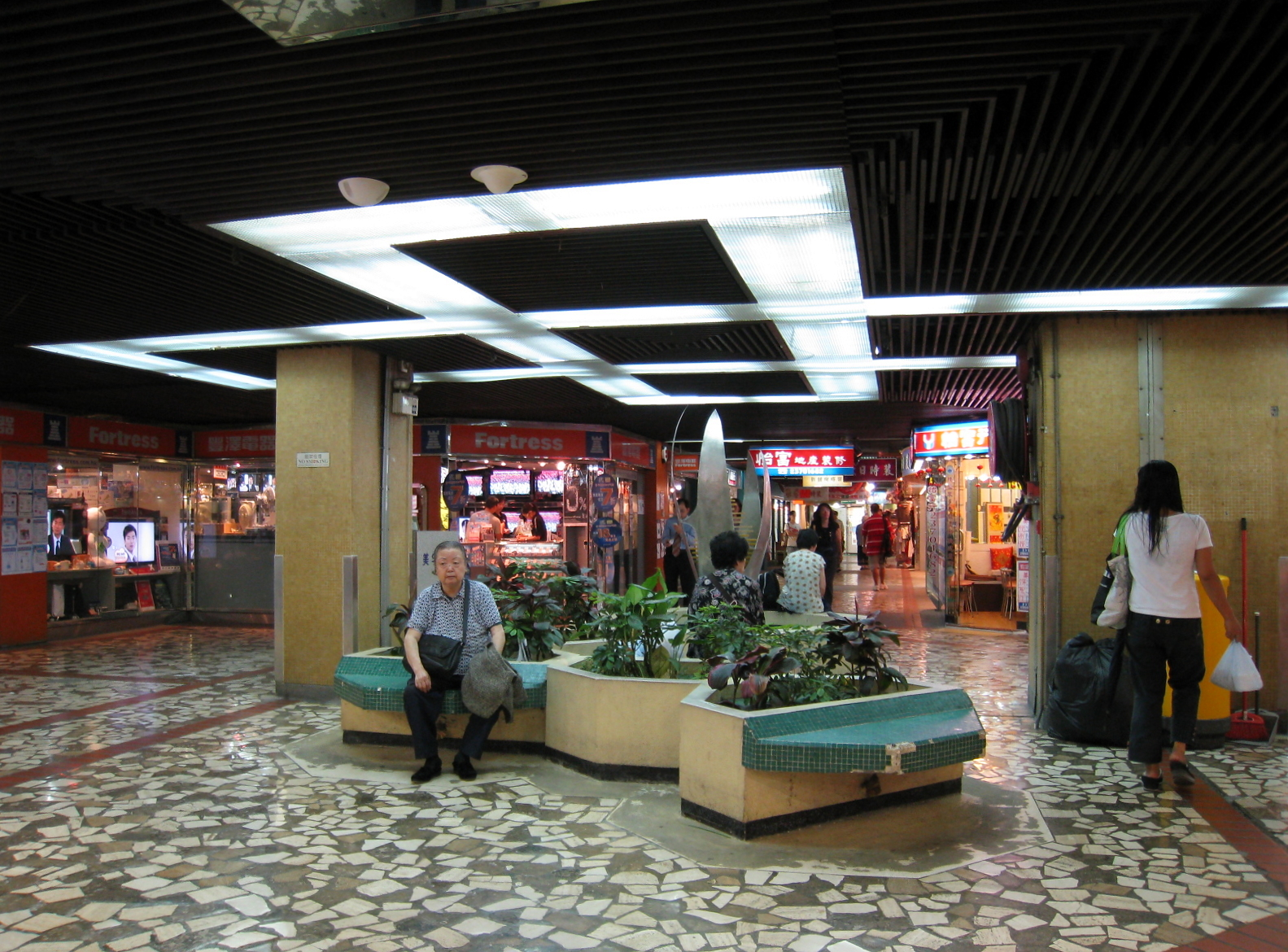
Mount Sterling Mall before renovation (2008)

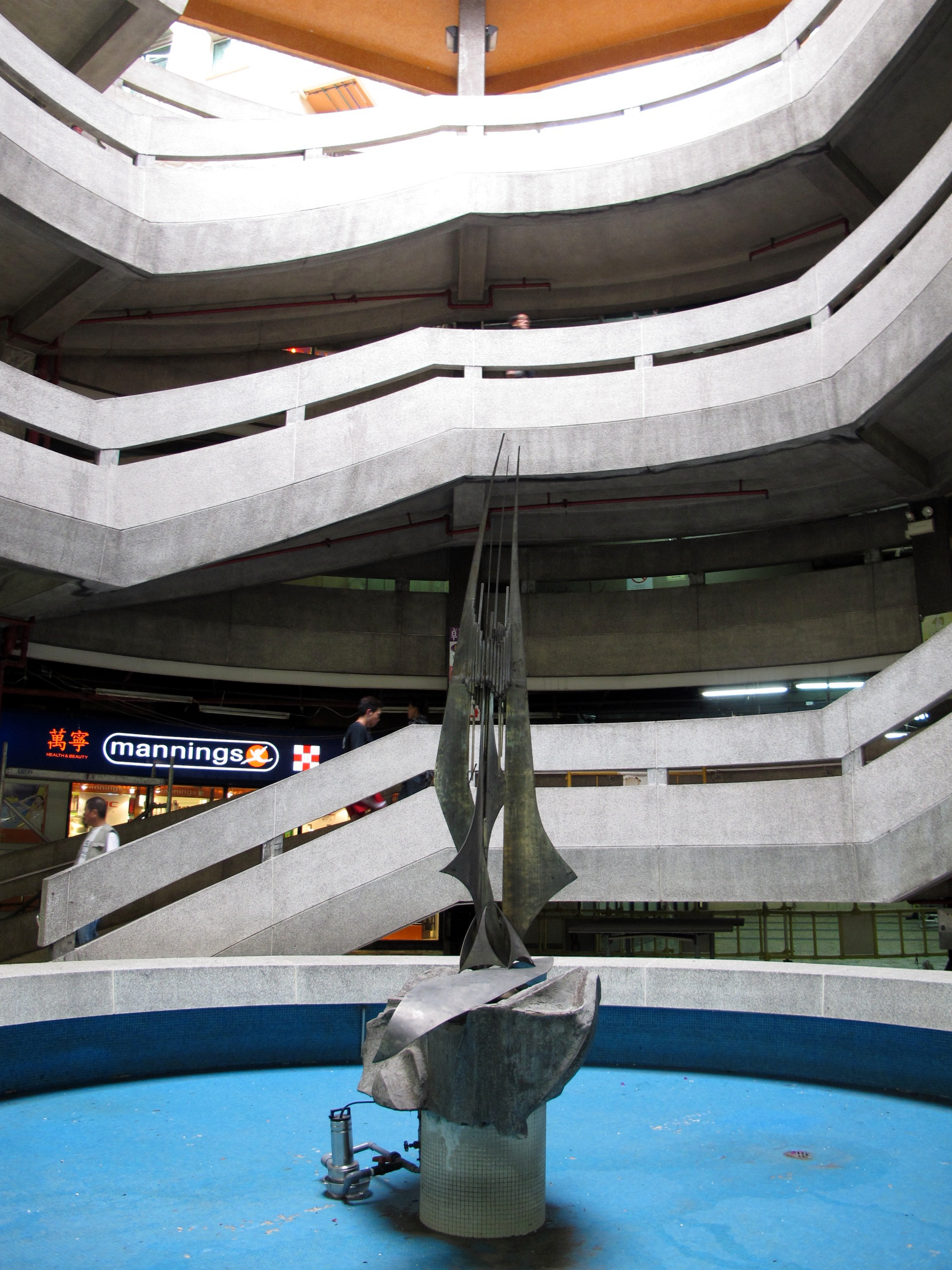
Mei Foo Sun Chuen shopping arcade atrium (2013)

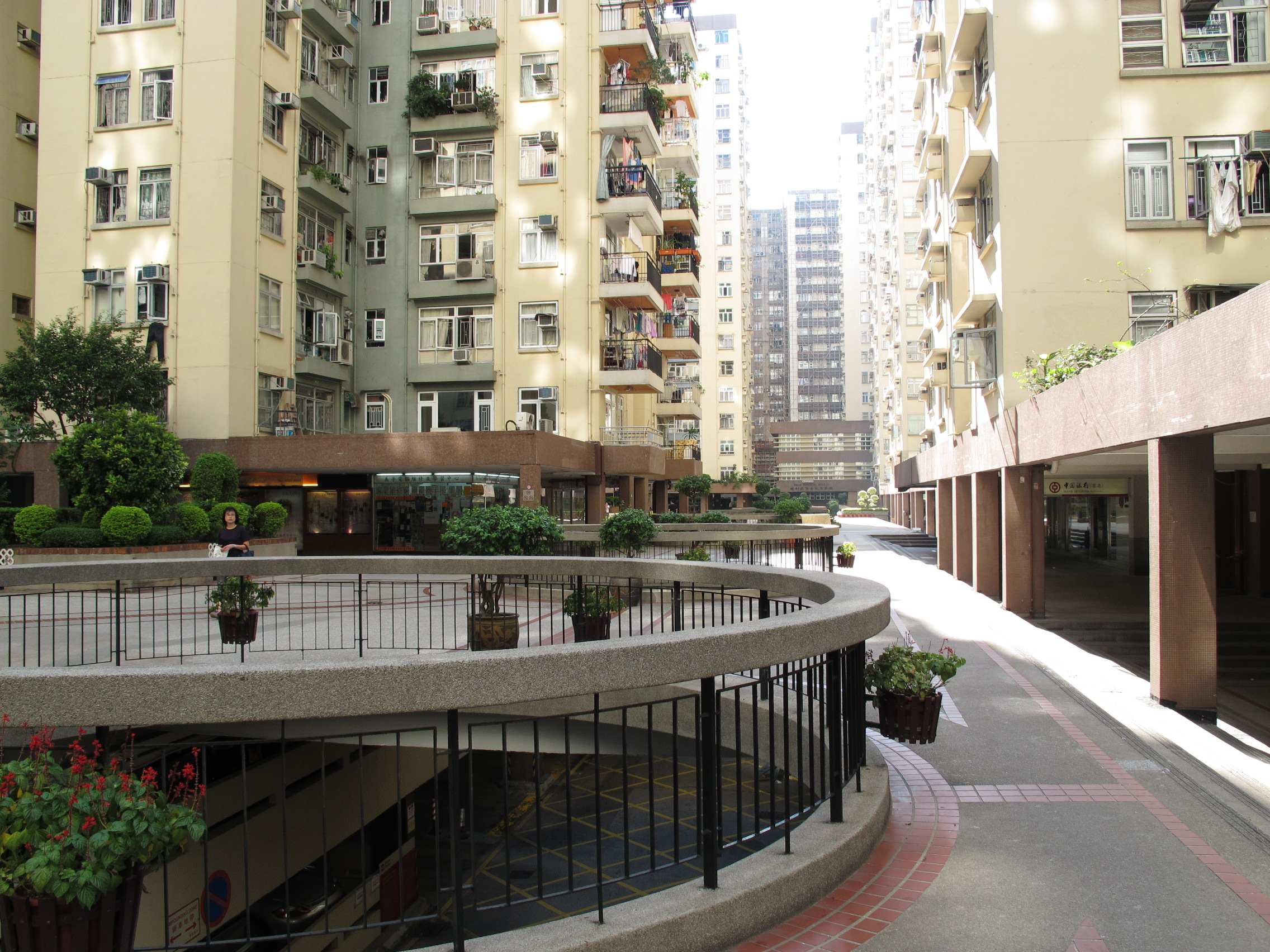
Podium (2011)

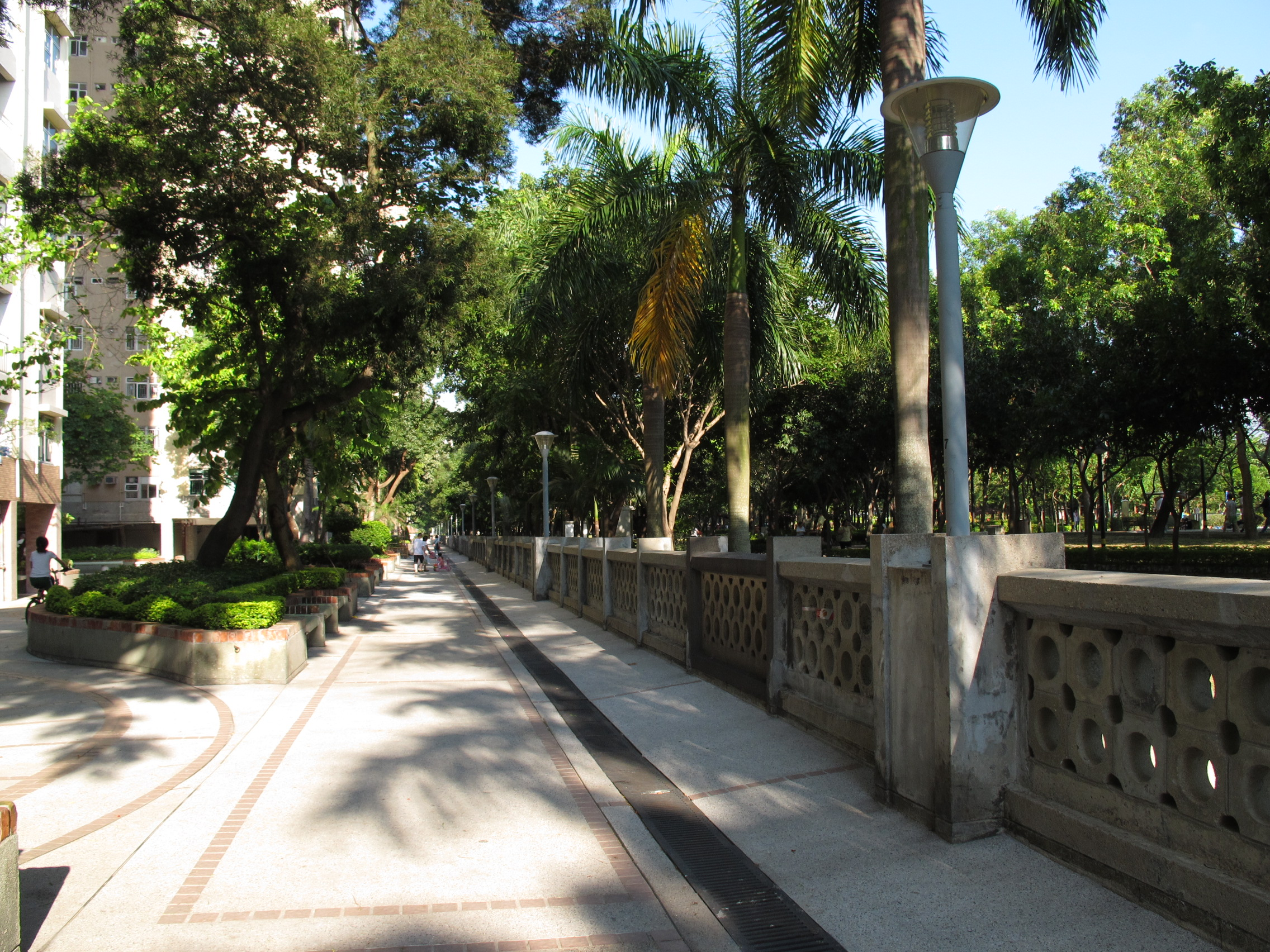
Former waterfront (2011)

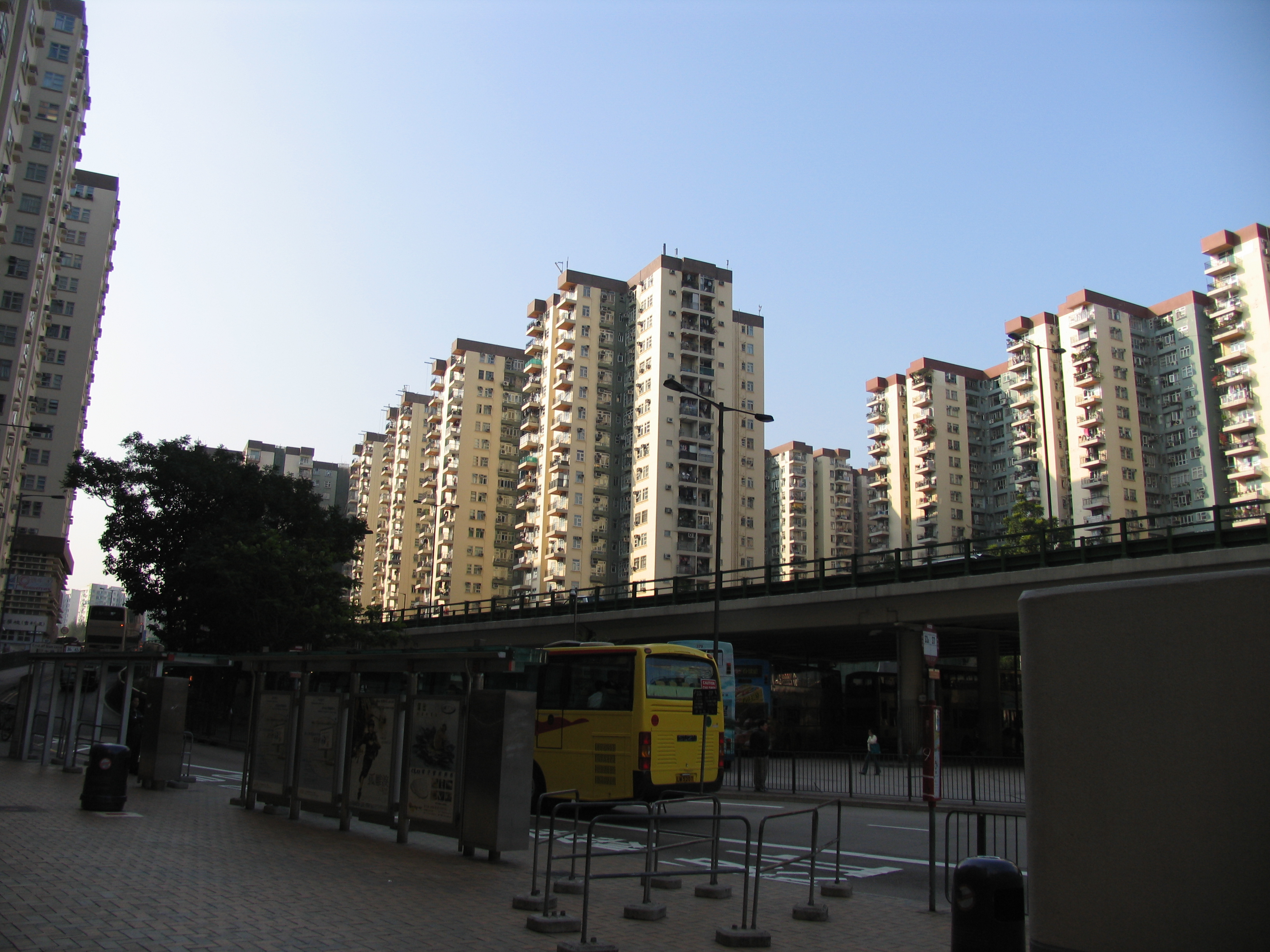

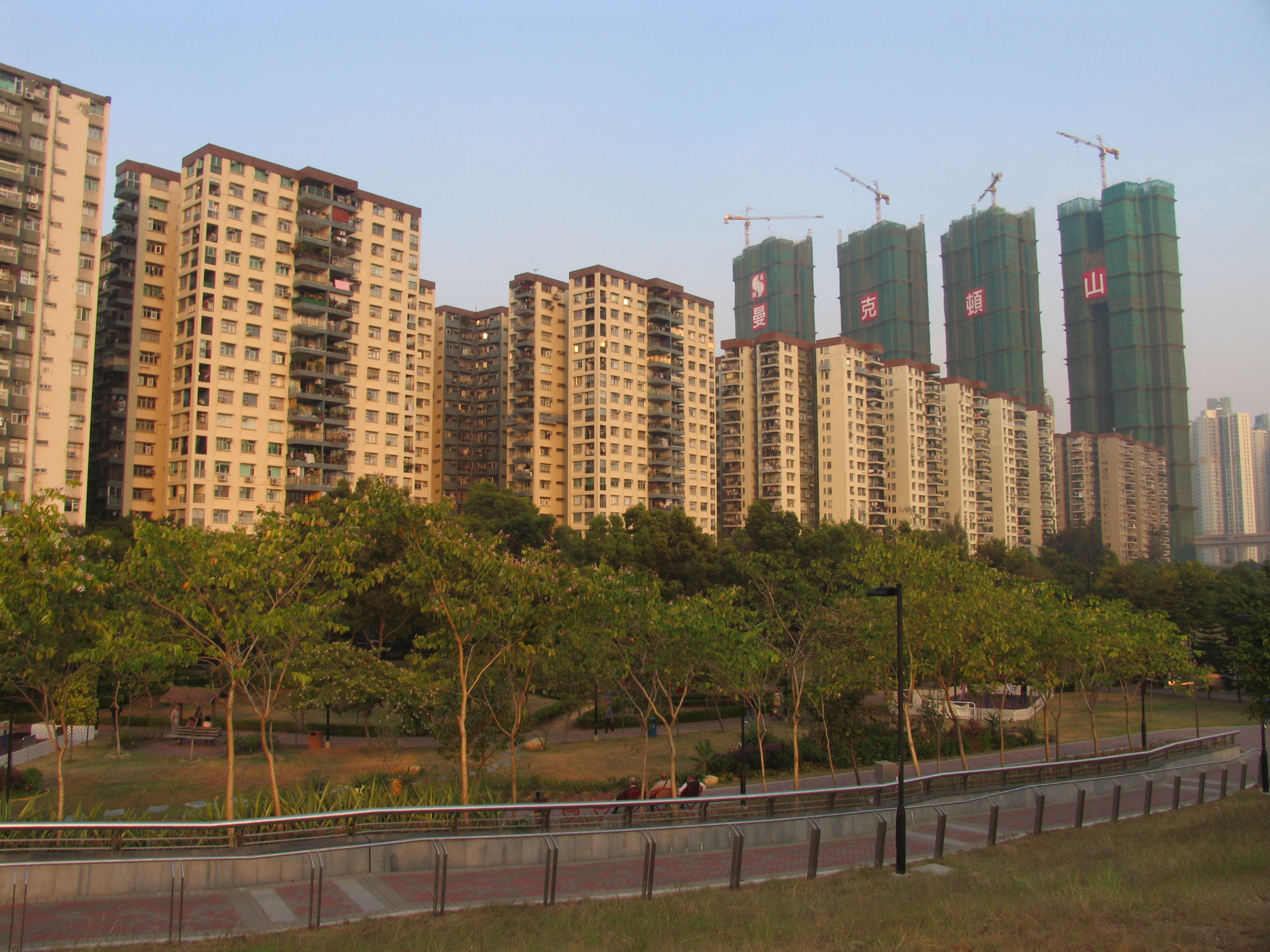

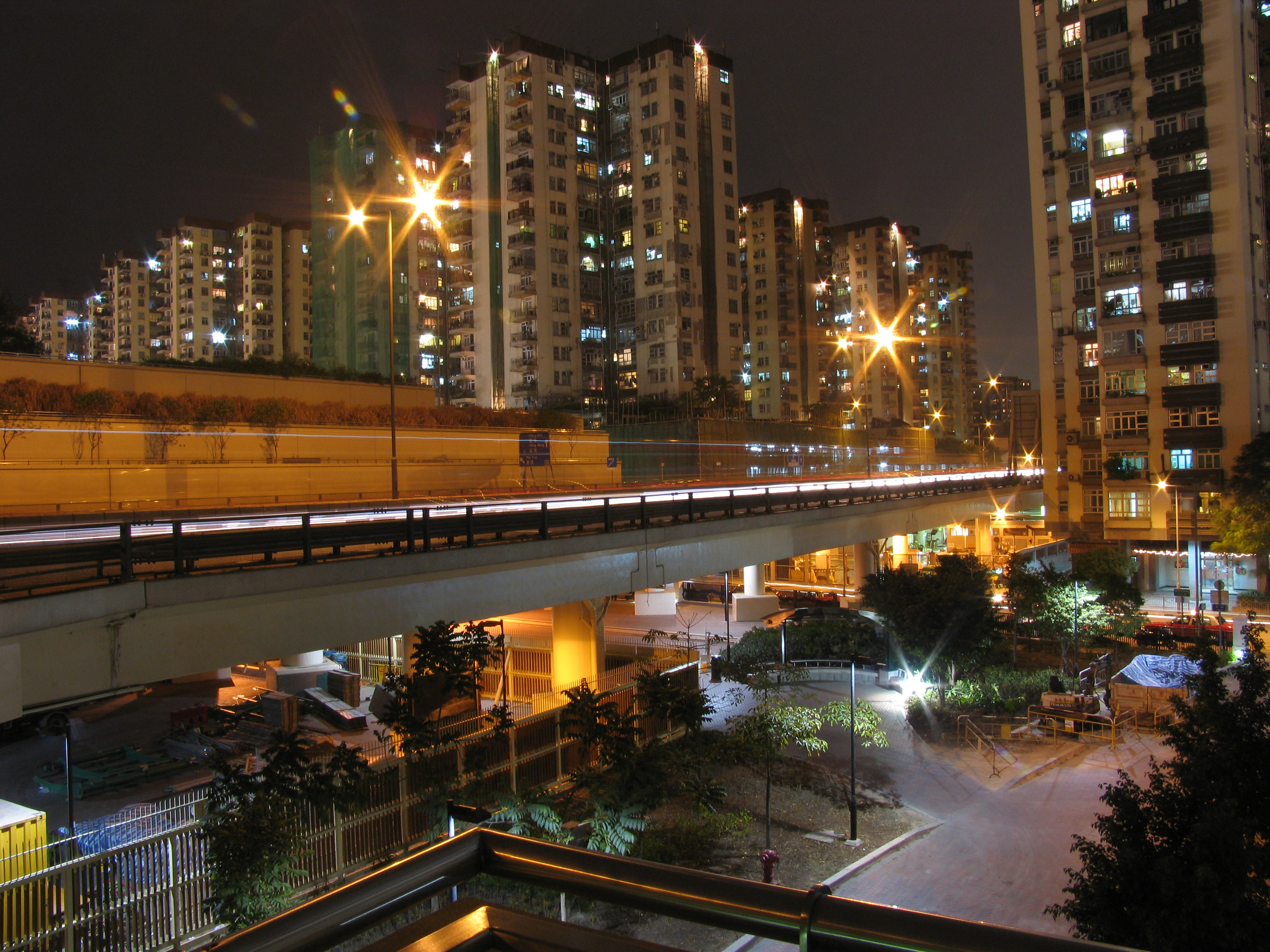

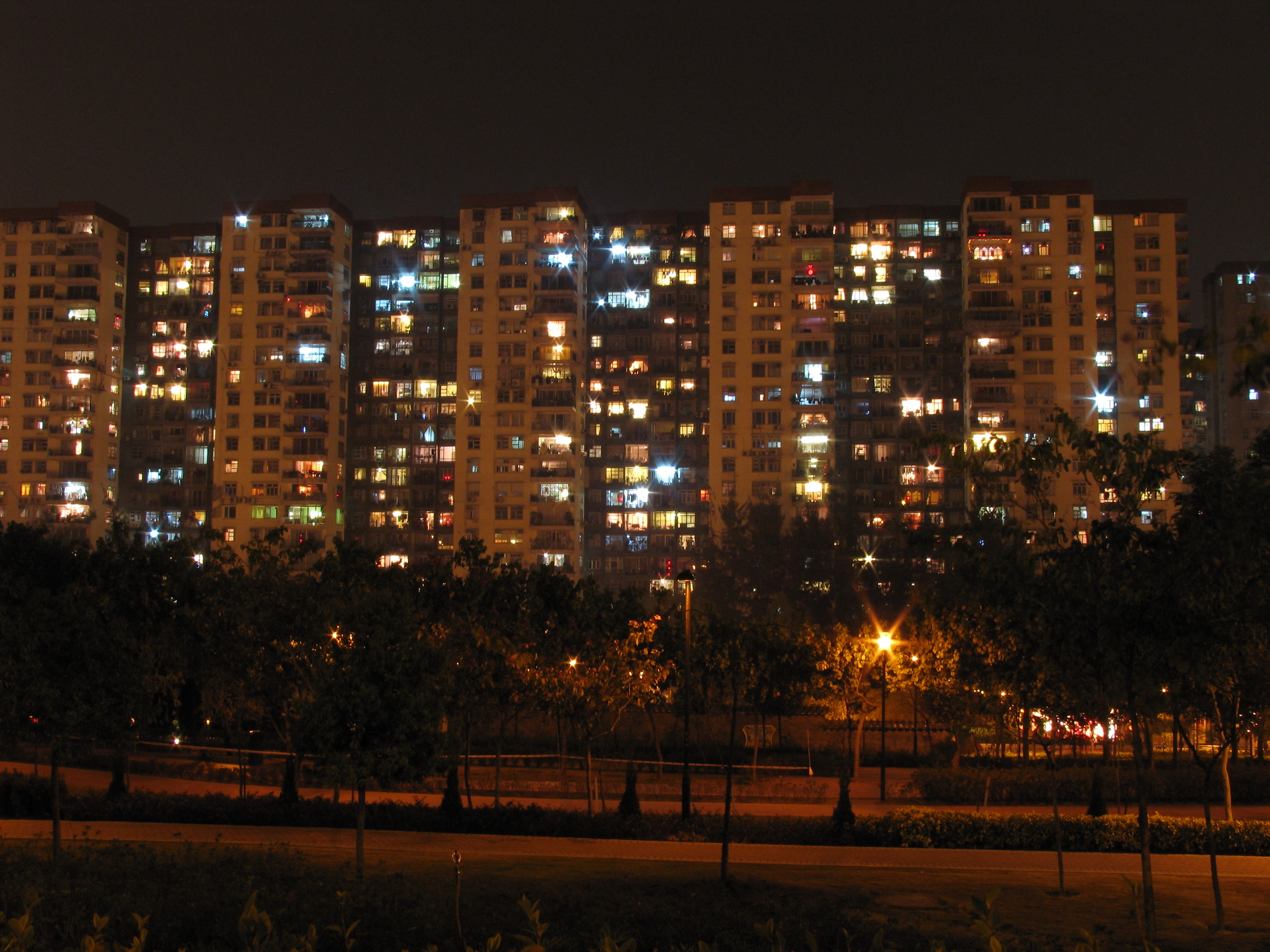

== See also ==
- Mei Foo station
- List of buildings and structures in Hong Kong
- List of places in Hong Kong
- Wong Tung & Partners
- Mei Foo Ferry Pier
