= Lai Chi Kok Park =

Public park in Lai Chi Kok, Hong Kong

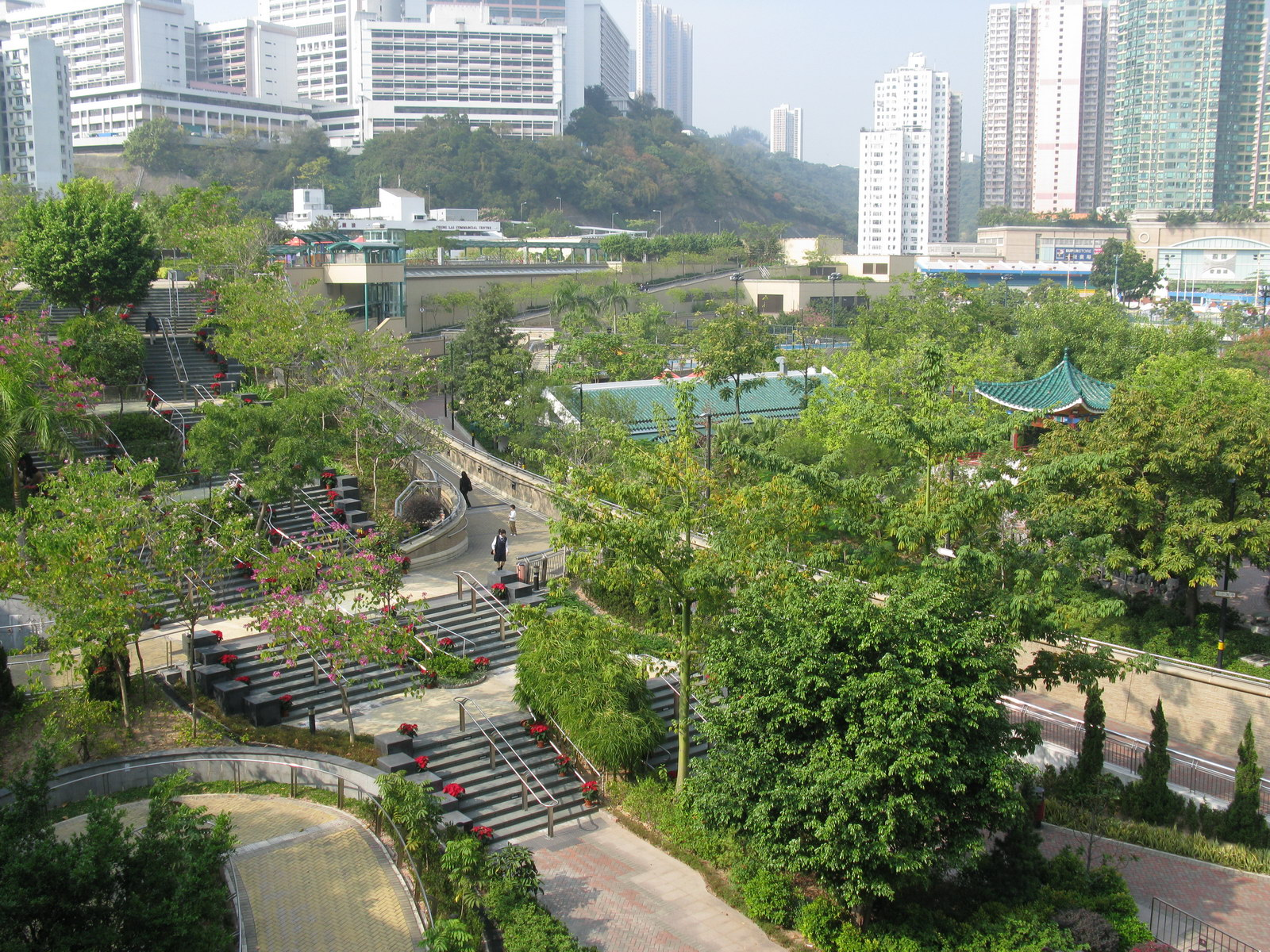
Overview of Lai Chi Kok Park in December 2007.

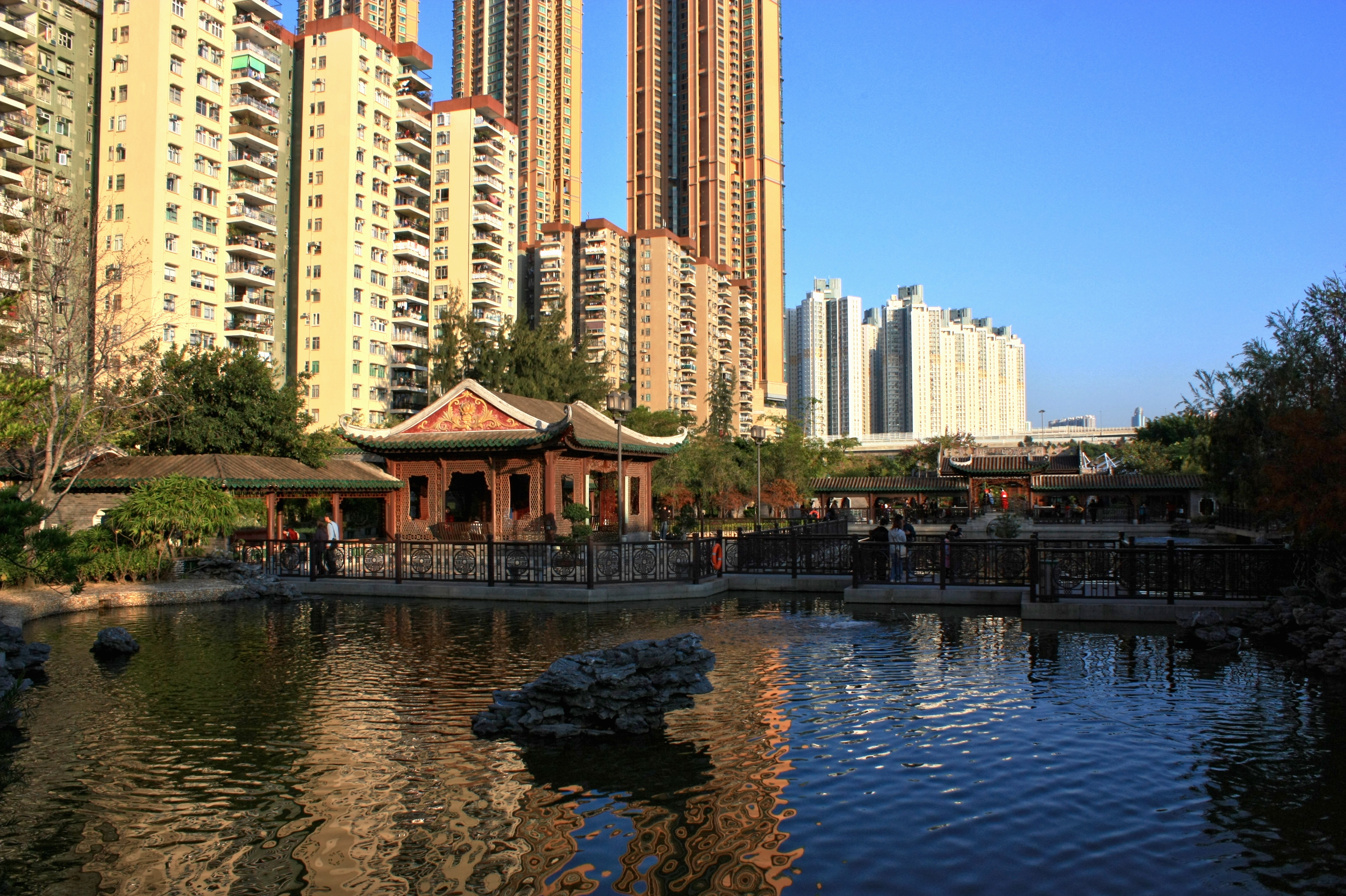
Lingnan Garden in January 2010.

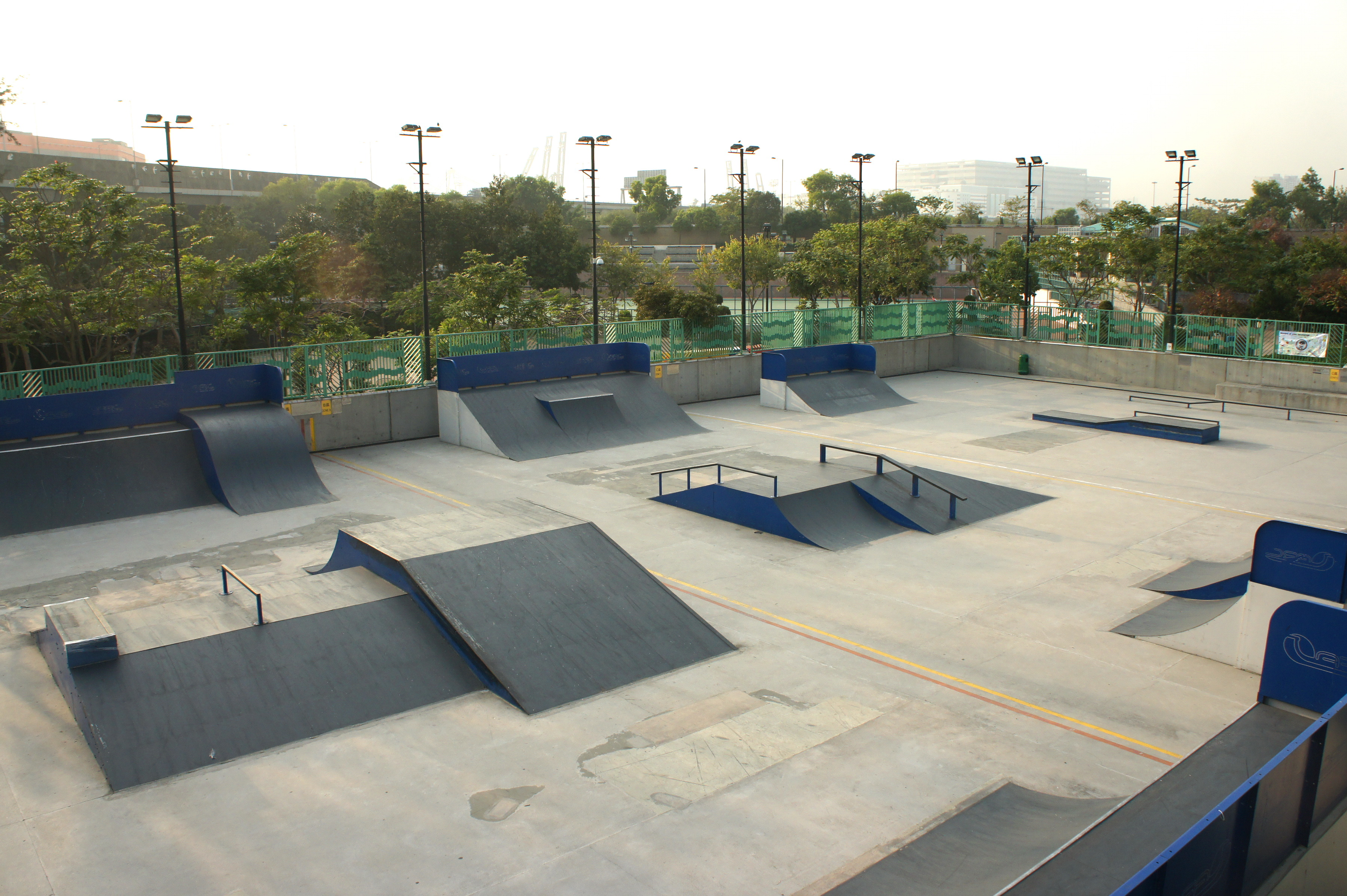
Skatepark in January 2012.

Lai Chi Kok Park (Chinese: 荔枝角公園) is a large public park in Hong Kong, on the reclamation of former Lai Chi Kok Bay adjacent to Mei Foo, stretching along the Kwai Chung Road motorway. The park is managed by the Leisure and Cultural Services Department of the Hong Kong Government.

== Features ==
The park contains a children's playground, a public swimming complex, an indoor sports centre (with squash courts, basketball courts, ballet studios and badminton courts), an outdoor running facility, a traditional Chinese garden, soccer fields, tennis courts and a skate park.

The swimming facility has two main, three training, two children's pools and one diving pool. The main pools are 1.2m-1.4m and 1.4m-1.9m in depth).

The Mei Foo skatepark is the largest skatepark in Hong Kong and also the most visited. It contains two half pipes and several quarter pipes, single rails and fun boxes. Most of the ramps are higher than 6 ft (1.8 m). The skatepark has been visited by various professional skateboarders such as Chris Haslam, Terrell Robinson, and Mike Peterson. My Little Airport, a local indie band, made a song about it.

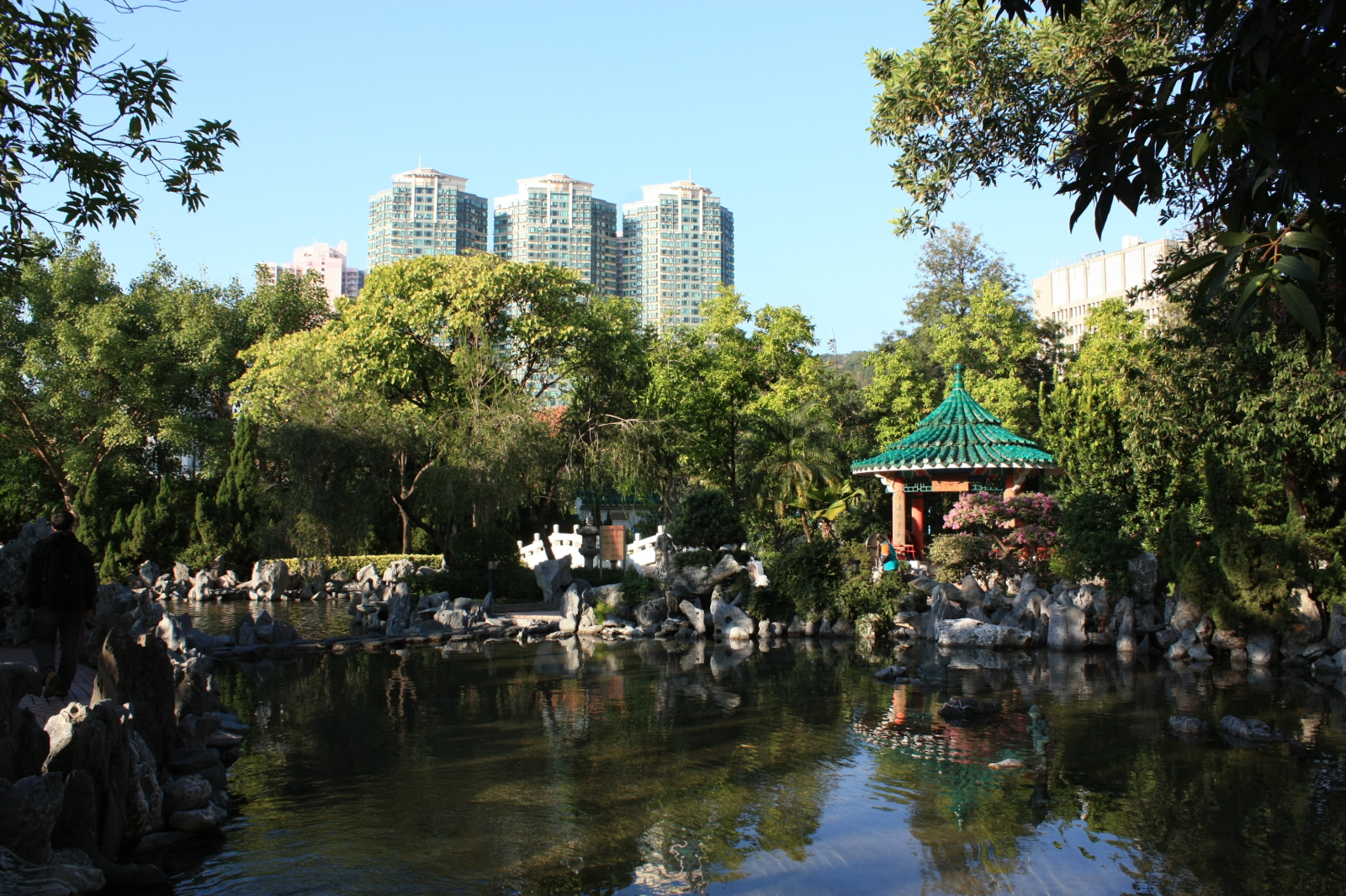
Chinese pavilion in Lai Chi Kok Park in January 2010

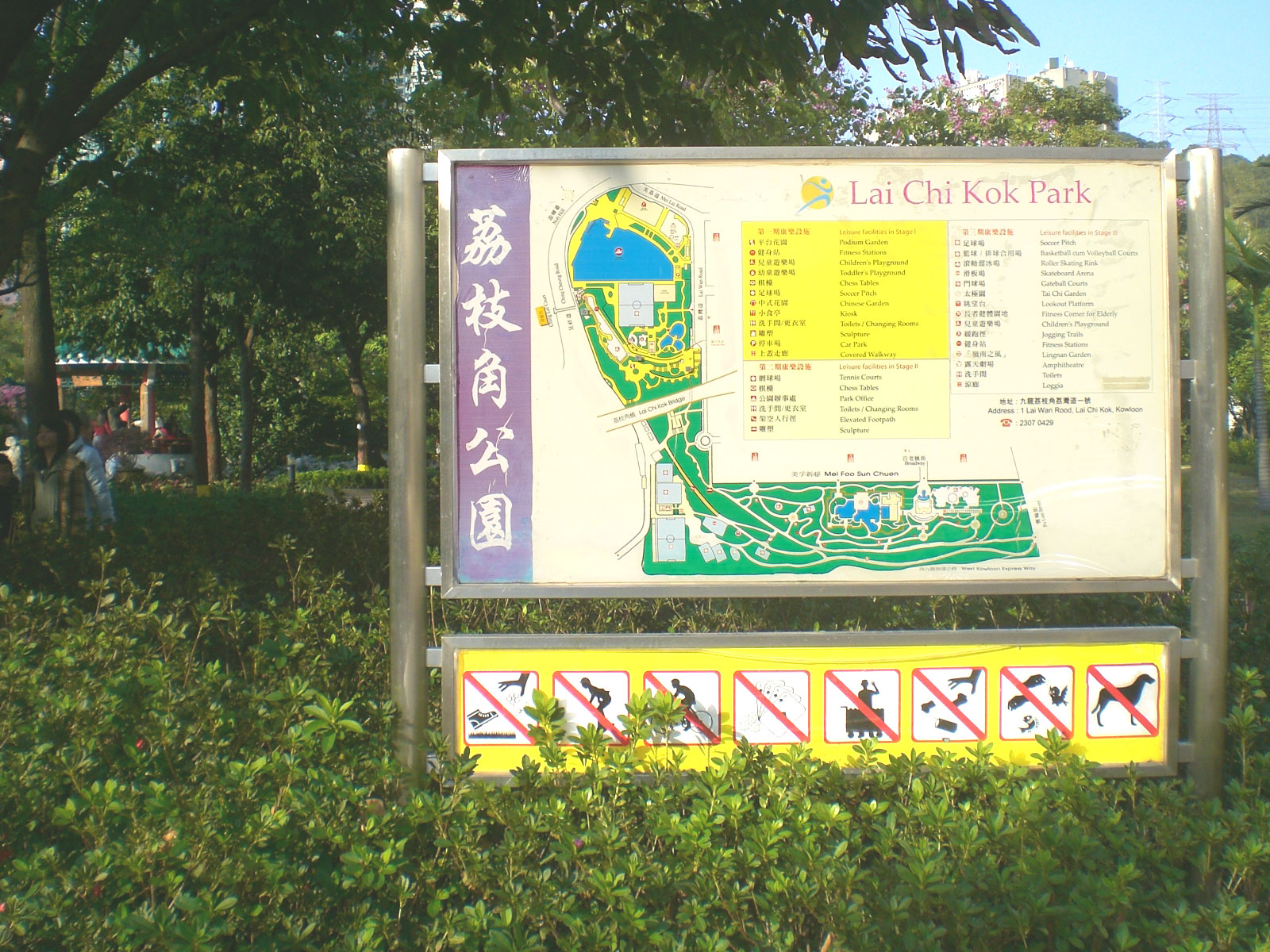
Map of Lai Chi Kok Park in January 2008

== See also ==
- Lai Chi Kok Amusement Park
- Po Leung Kuk Tong Nai Kan Junior Secondary College
