= Lai Chi Kok Bay =

Bay west

Lai Chi Kok Bay (Chinese: 荔枝角灣) or Lai Wan (Chinese: 荔灣) was a bay west of Lai Chi Kok in Hong Kong. North of the bay is Kau Wa Keng. The bay was largely recreational during its history. In the early and mid 20th century, bathing pavilions were built on the beach of the bay for swimmers, and boats were rented for rowing around the bay. Lai Chi Kok Amusement Park, the Song Dynasty Village, and theatres were built on the shore. The bay was later reclaimed and recreational facilities like a park, swimming pool, library, and indoor sports facilities were built. Lai Chi Kok Bay literally means the point of lychee.

The bay was spanned by the Lai Chi Kok Bridge, built 1968.

In 1975, the Hong Kong Government announced plans to reclaim the bay and turn it into a public park. Though the bay was popular with swimmers, the government considered this a "hazard" as the water was badly polluted. At the same time, the government said the project would provide much-needed public open space for the Mei Foo area.

== See also ==
- Lai Wan station (now Mei Foo station)
