= Kwai Chung Road =

Throughway in Kwai Chung of the New Territories in Hong Kong

Coordinates: 22.3538°N 114.1342°E

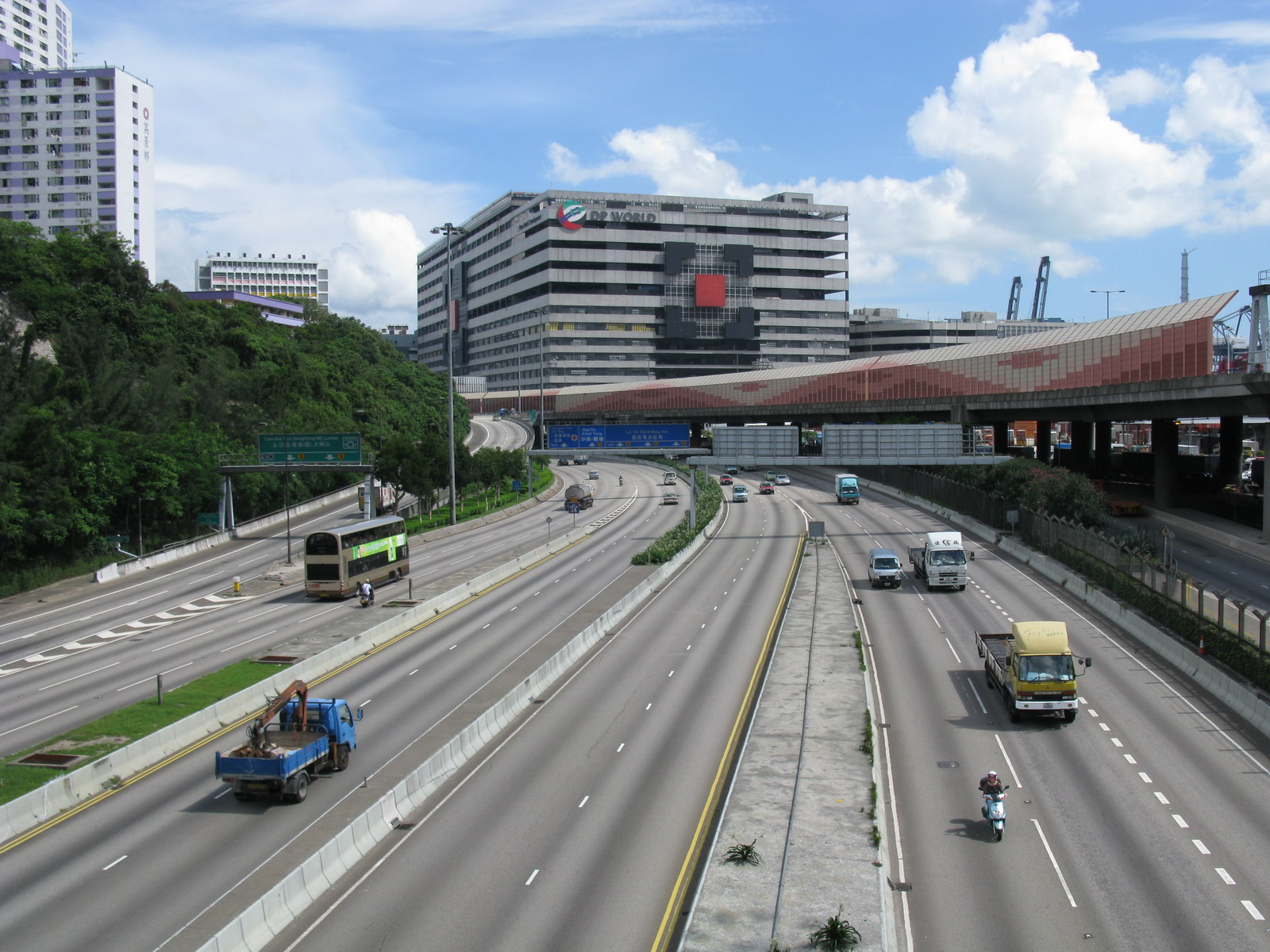
Kwai Chung Road near Kwai Chung Container Port

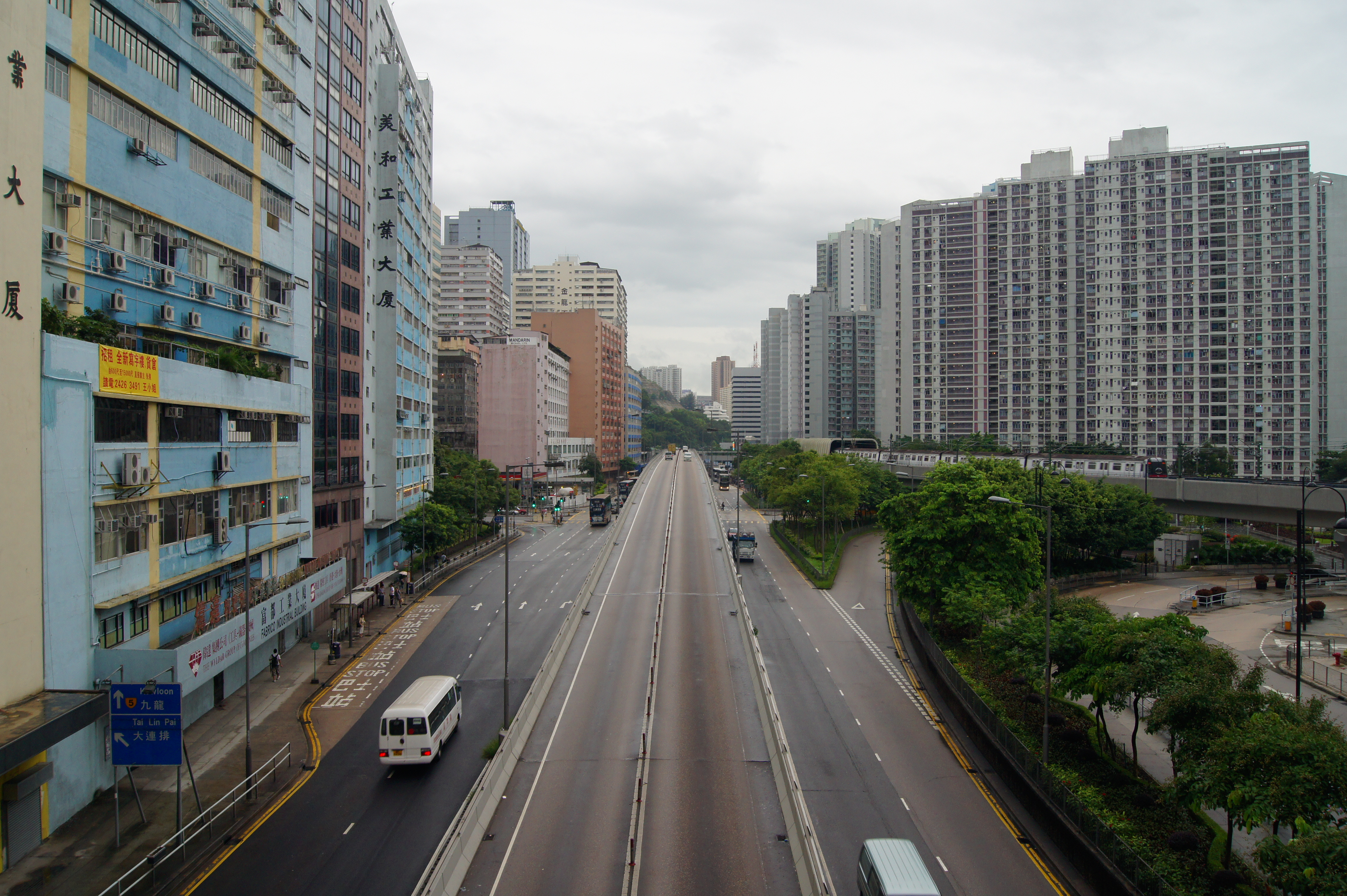
Kwai Chung Road near Kwai Hing

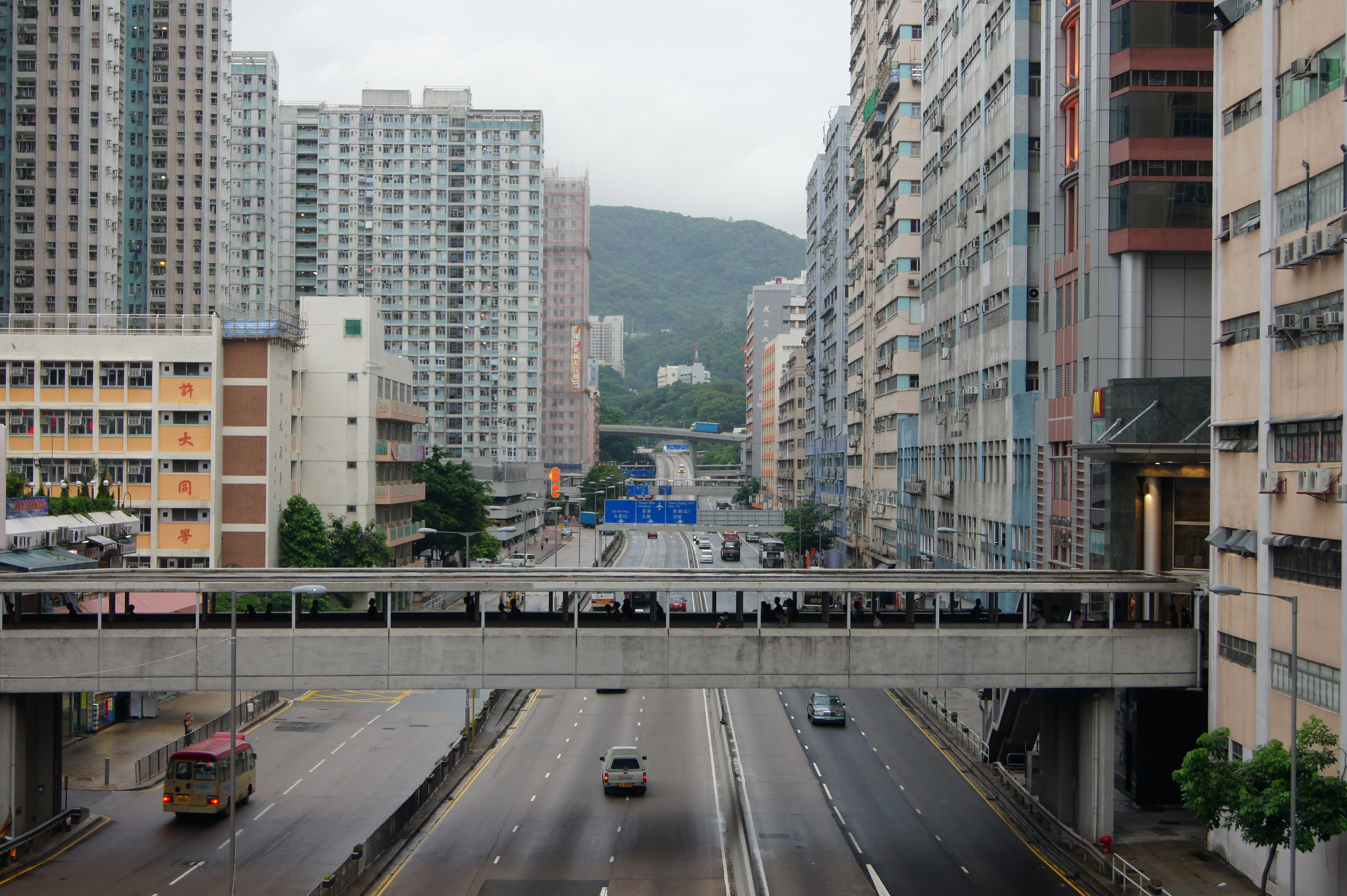
North section of Kwai Chung Road

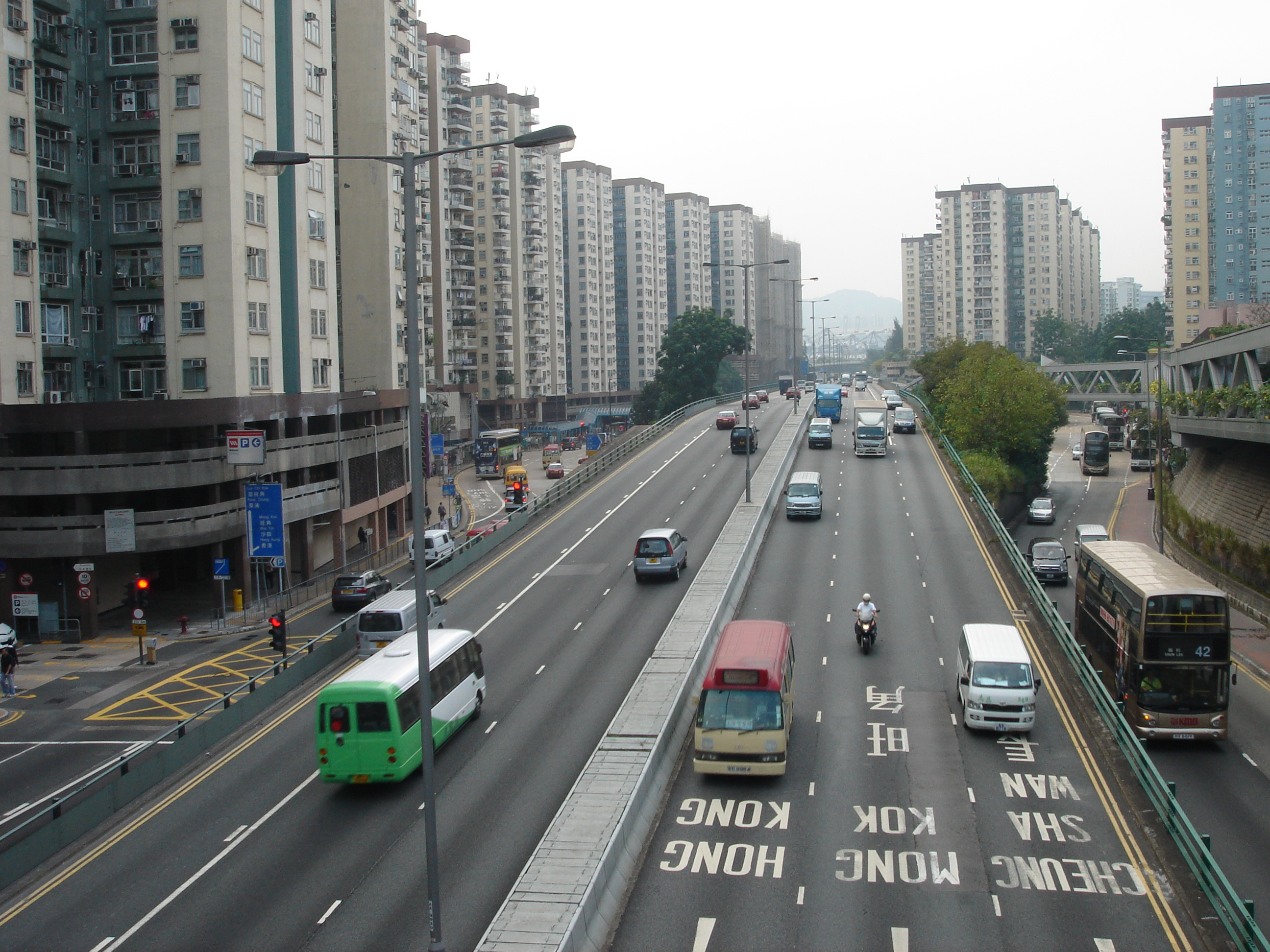
Kwai Chung Road Flyover, among the buildings of Mei Foo Sun Chuen

Kwai Chung Road (Chinese: 葵涌道; Jyutping: kwai4 cung1 dou6) is a throughway in Kwai Chung of the New Territories in Hong Kong. It is one of the busiest roads in Hong Kong. The Transport Department has classified it as a trunk road.

It was built in the 1960s for the two main development projects in Hong Kong, one for the Tsuen Wan New Town, another for the Kwai Chung Container Port. The road replaces the Castle Peak Road as the main connection between Tsuen Wan and Kowloon. It hosts most public bus routes from Tsuen Wan, Kwai Chung and Tsing Yi to Kowloon and vice versa. There are about one hundred bus routes using this road.

== Route ==
The road starts from a junction with Cheung Sha Wan Road, Lai Chi Kok Road and Butterfly Valley Road in Cheung Sha Wan, via Kwai Chung Road Flyover in Mei Foo, Lai Chi Kok Bridge, Chung Kwai Chung, and ends at a junction with Castle Peak Road and Cheung Wing Road in Sheung Kwai Chung. It has served the new town of Kwai Chung on the reclamation of Lap Sap Wan, and also the Kwai Chung Container Terminals. The section south of Tsuen Wan Road is part of Route 5.

== History ==
Before the construction of Kwai Chung Road, Castle Peak Road was the only road to connect to Kowloon and the western New Territories. In the 1960s, Castle Peak Road was by then more than 40 years old and did not meet the needs of the future development plans of the New Territories. The Government of Hong Kong developed the Tsuen Wan New Town and Kwai Chung Container Port. Tsuen Wan New Town consists of Tsuen Wan, Kwai Chung and Tsing Yi. The Gin Drinkers Bay in Kwai Chung was reclaimed completely afterwards. Kwai Chung Road was built along the coastal line of the bay which is inside the new town and close to the container port.

In the 1990s, the road was reconstructed during the building of the Hong Kong International Airport. Another elevated highway was built on top of Kwai Chung Road near the container port. The reconstruction eased the traffic congestion of Kwai Chung Road and met the need of expansion of the new town and container port. Construction works commenced in 1993 and were completed in February 1997.

== Geography ==
Kwai Chung Road was built along the old coastal line. The southern part is more hilly and the northern is on a small plain. Thus the southern part suffers from landslides during rainstorms occasionally.

== Buildings ==
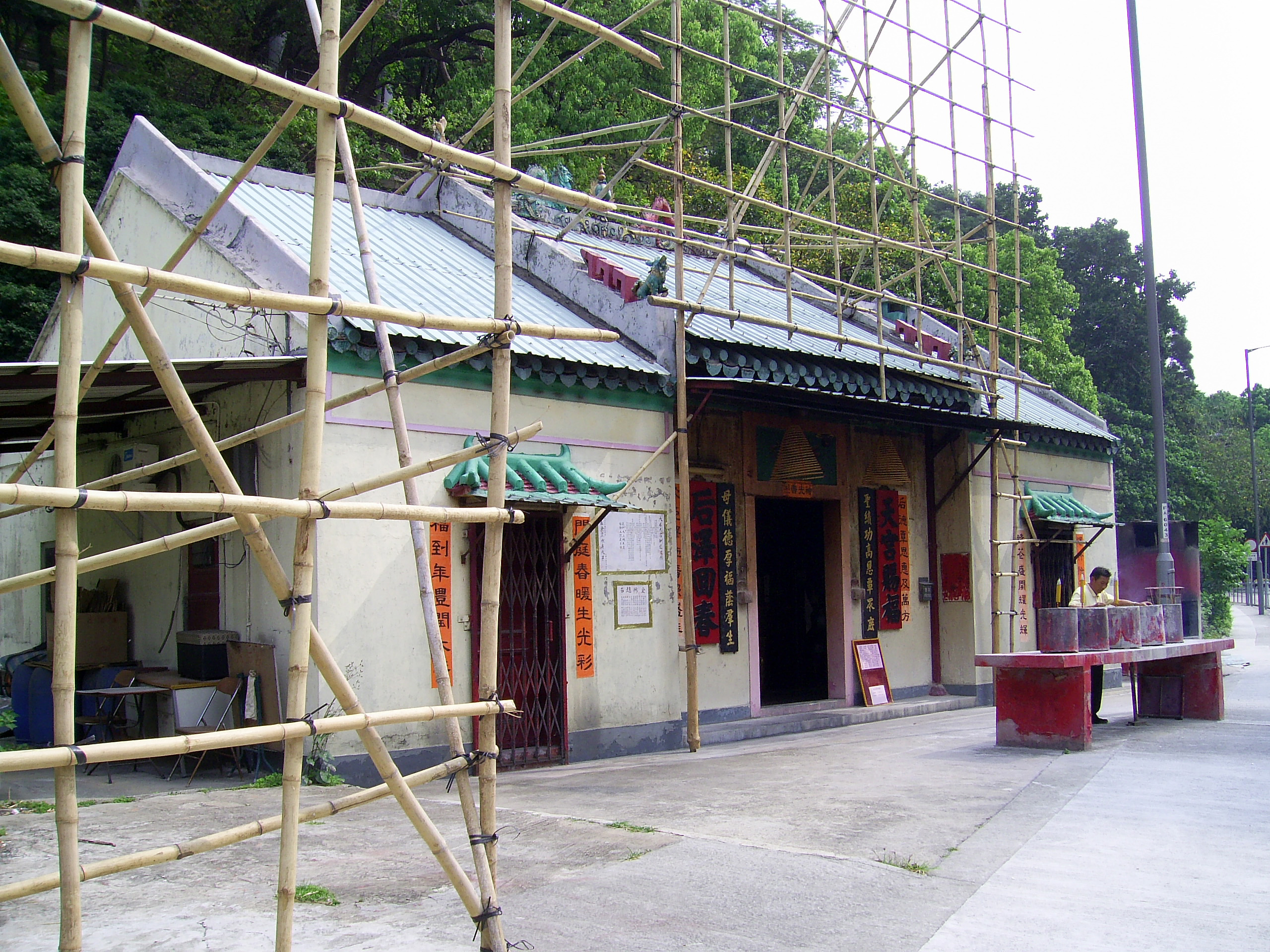
Kwai Chung Tin Hau Temple

Buildings are arranged from south to north

- Mei Foo Sun Chuen, the largest private estates in Hong Kong, with 99 residential buildings.
- Mariner's Club, a building besides Kwai Chung Container Port
- Lai King station, an MTR station.
- Kwai Chung Tin Hau Temple, relocated to side of the Road, owing to reclamation of Lap Shap Wan in 1966. The original temple was built before 1828.
- Kwai Chung Police Station, located at 999 Kwai Chung Road. As the station is very close the road, the Environmental Protection Department has set up an air monitor station to measure the Air Pollution Index.
- Kwai Fong Estate, a public estate built on the reclamation.
- Kwai Hing Estate, a public estate built on the reclamation.

== Traffic ==
Transport Department has recorded over 140 thousand vehicles each day. It is the busiest road between Kowloon and the New Territories.

== See also ==
- List of streets and roads in Hong Kong
- Lai Chi Kok Bridge

Preceded by Lai Chi Kok Road	Hong Kong Route 5 Kwai Chung Road	Succeeded by Tsuen Wan Road
