= Kau Wa Keng =

Area and village of Hong Kong

Coordinates: 22.34373°N 114.13833°E

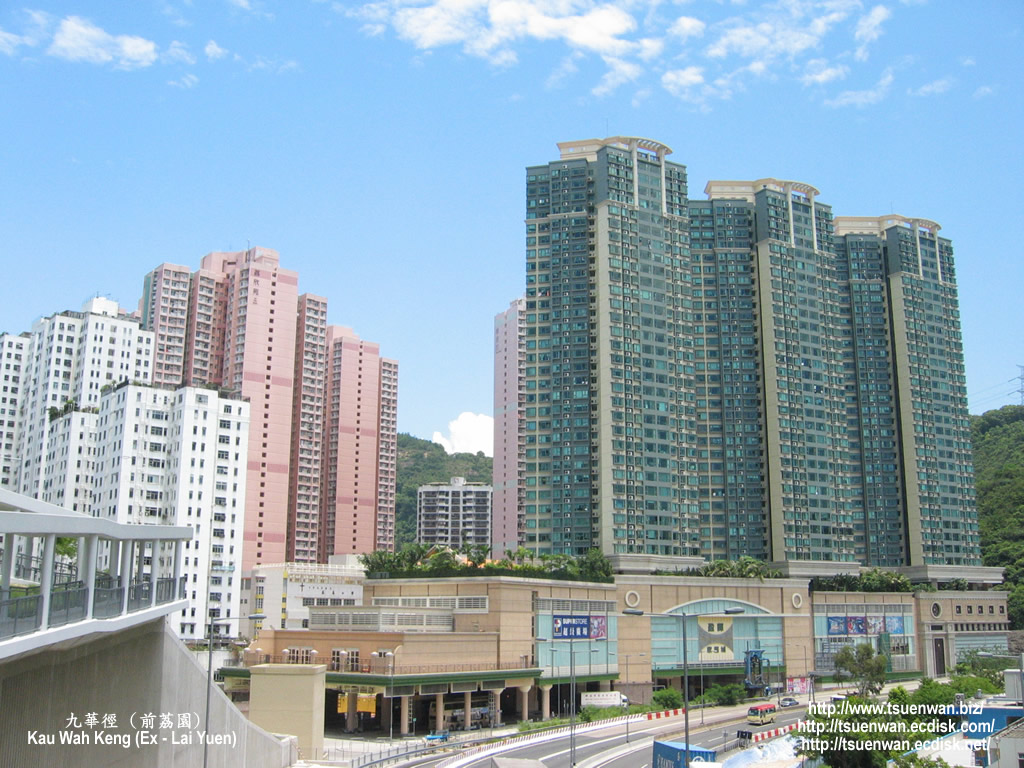
Buildings in Kau Wa Keng: Lai Chi Kok Bay Garden, Lai Yan Court and Nob Hill.

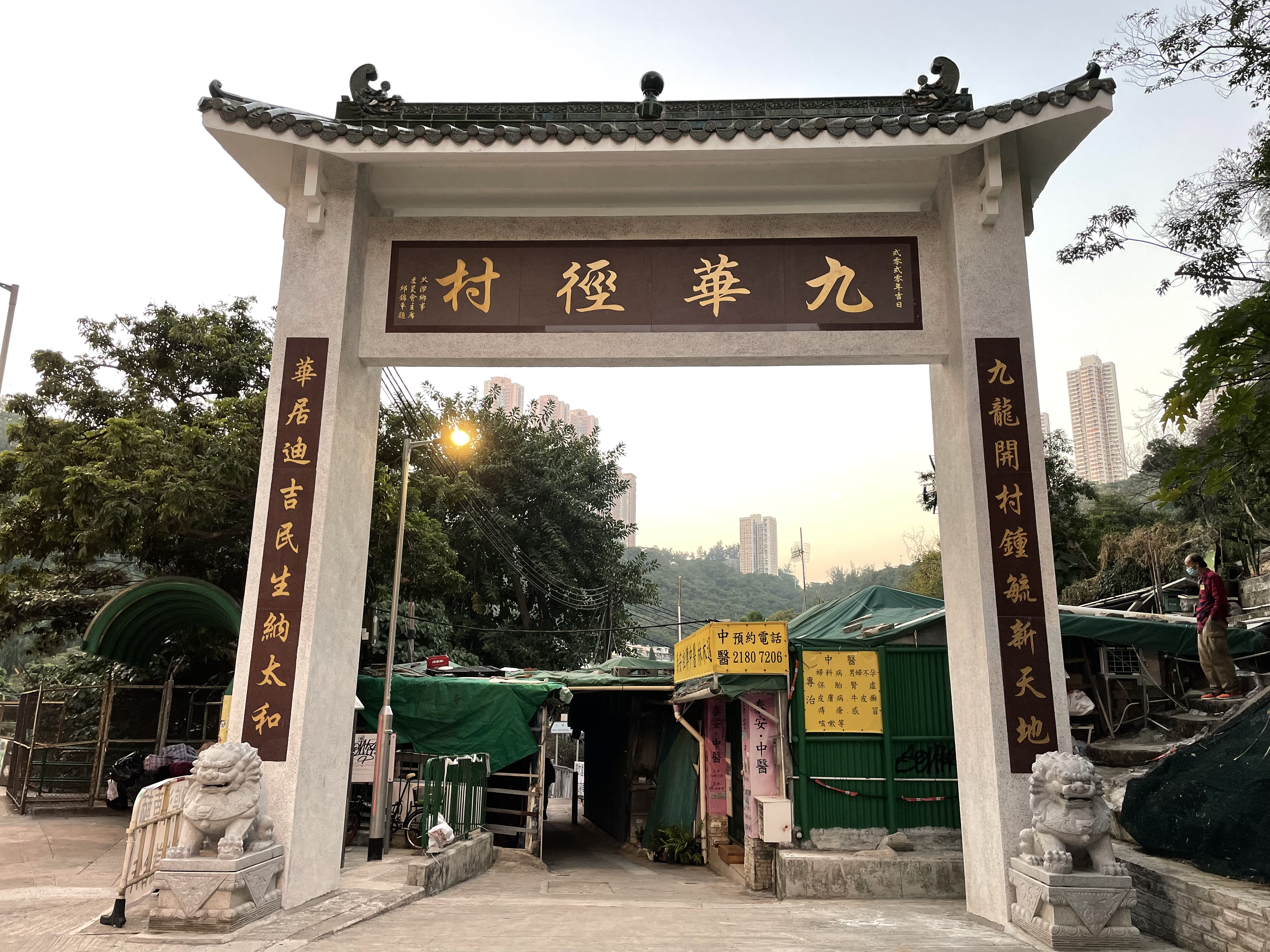
Paifang of Kau Wa Keng.

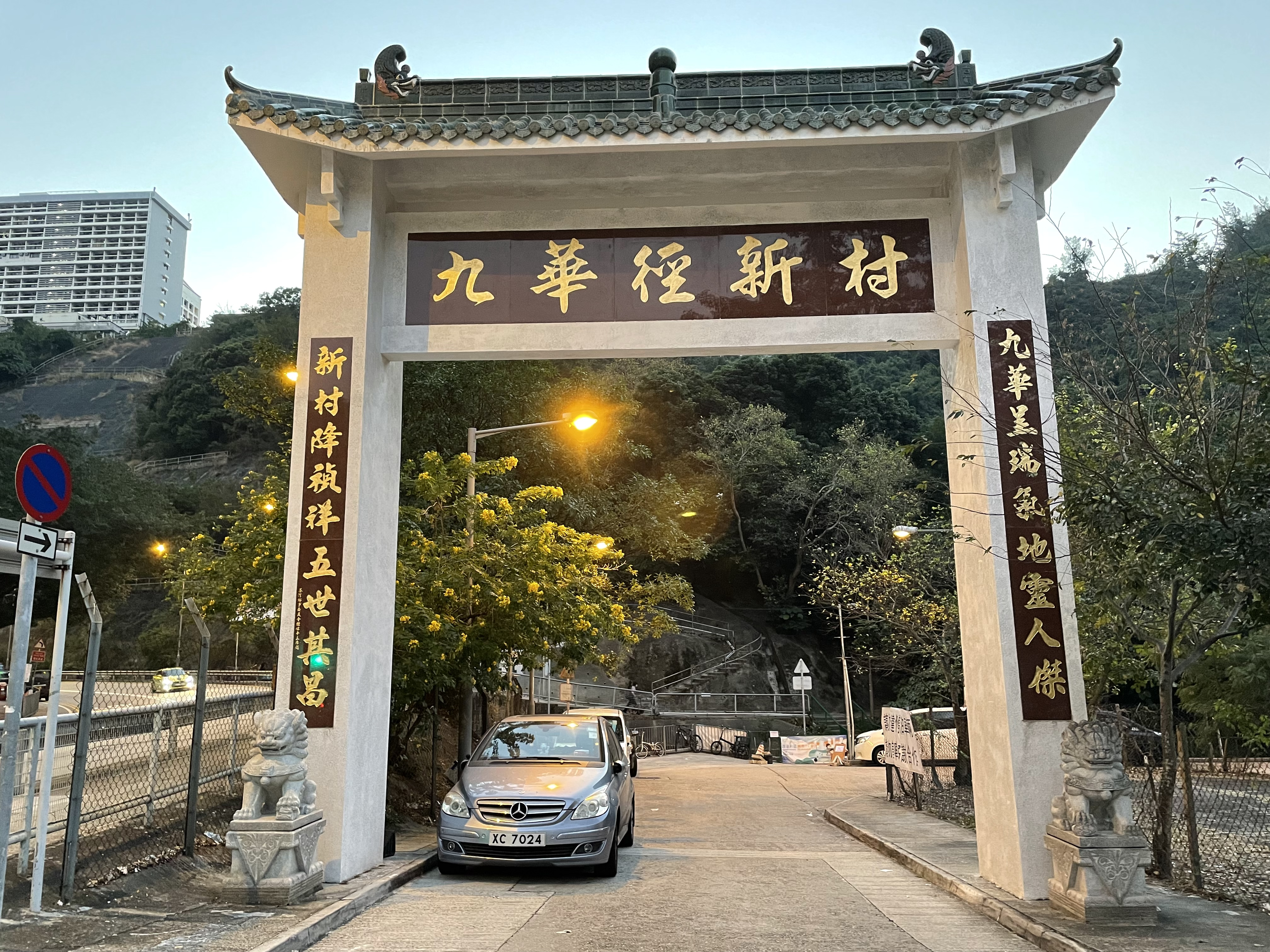
Paifang of Kau Wa Keng San Tsuen.

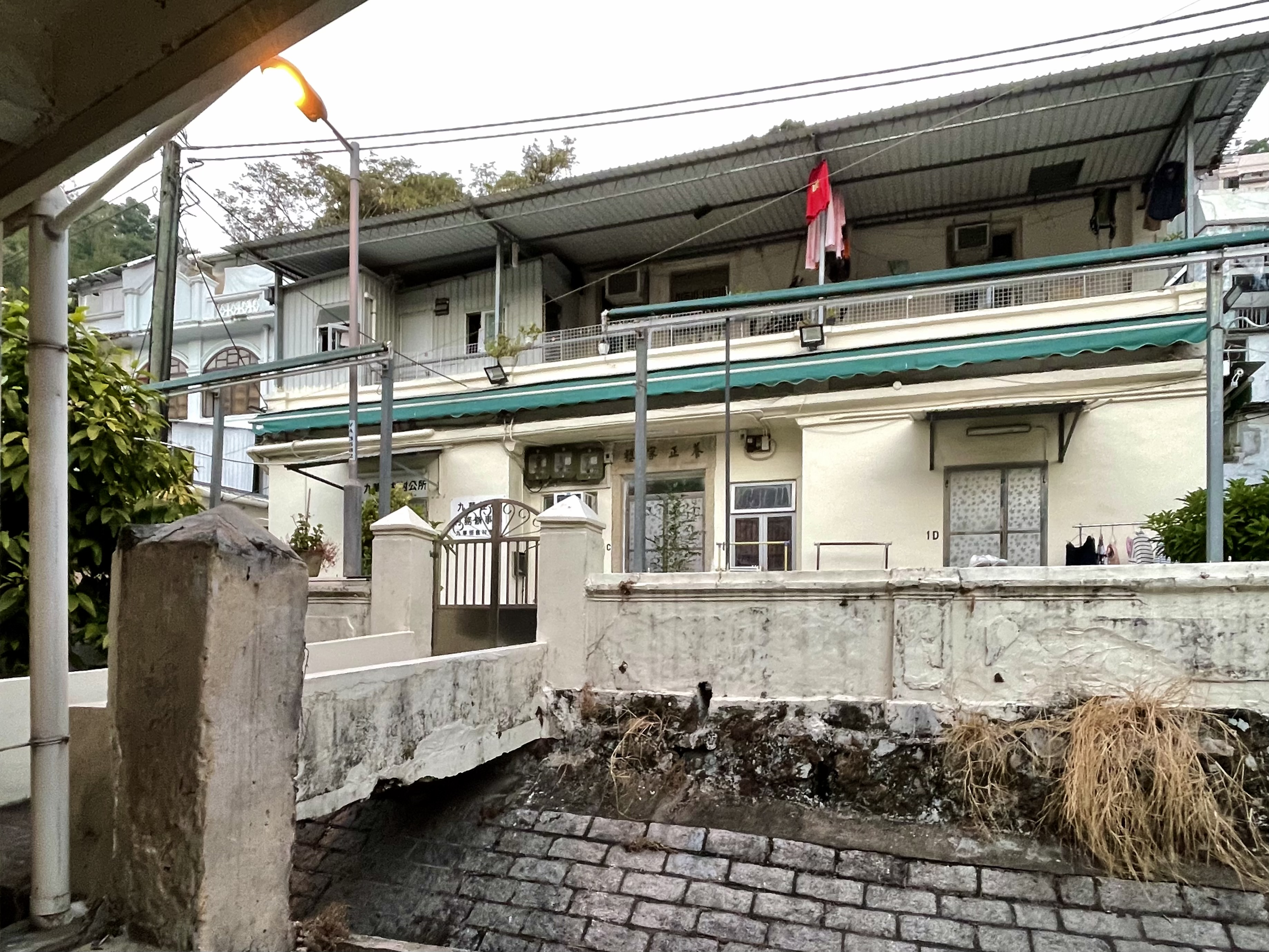
The Yeung Ching Study Hall is now used as the village committee office and a residence.

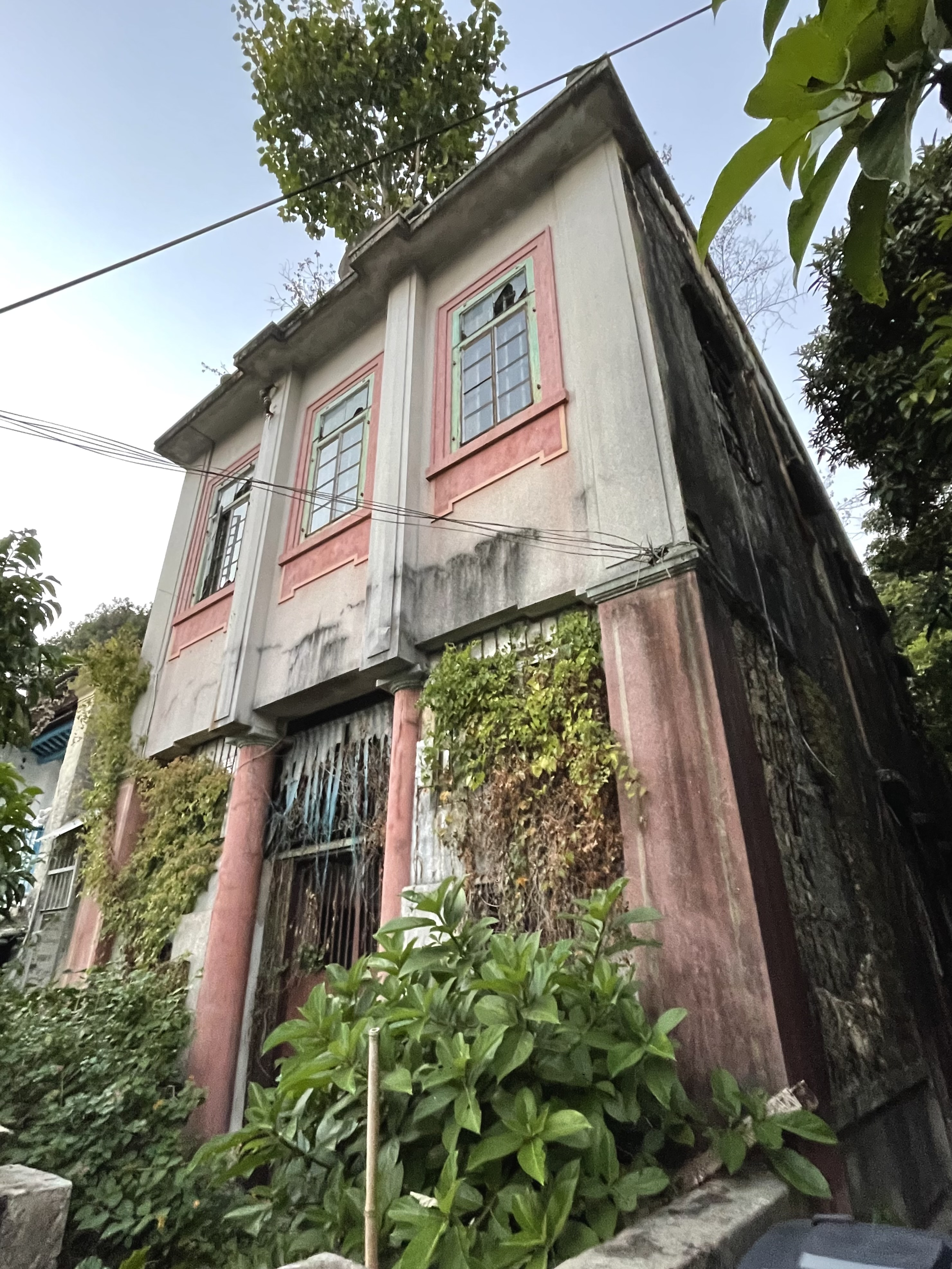
Tsang Residence is a Grade III historic building

Kau Wa Keng (Chinese: 九華徑), also known as Kau Wah Keng or Kau Wa Kang, is a village and valley in Lai King, Kowloon, Hong Kong. It is located near the reclaimed Lai Chi Kok Bay in New Kowloon. Three rivers in the valley once converged at the bay and forming a beach at the estuary. Kau Wah Keng is the former site of Lai Chi Kok Amusement Park, which closed in 1997.

Although the valley is closer to the suburbs of Cheung Sha Wan, specifically the communities of Lai Chi Kok and Mei Foo, it traditionally and administratively belongs to Kwai Chung.

== Administration ==
Kau Wa Keng is a recognized village under the New Territories Small House Policy. It is one of the villages represented within the Tsuen Wan Rural Committee. For electoral purposes, Kau Wa Keng is part of the Lai Wah constituency, which was formerly represented by Steve Cheung Kwan-kiu until his resignation in July 2021.

== Villages ==
During the Qianlong reign of the Qing dynasty, the ban on human settlement in the coastal areas of Xin'an County was lifted, leading to immigration into the region. The old village of Kau Wa Keng was built by Hakka people who cultivated paddies next to the rivers on the eastern side of the valley. The oldest extant residents in the village belong to the Ng (吳) and Tsang (曾) lineages, whose descendants include the actress Margie Tsang. An ancestral hall and the Yeung Ching School (養正學校) are located in the village. It was formerly known as Kau Pa Keng (狗爬徑), which means dog climbing path, before it was renamed to the current Kau Wa Keng, (literally, "Ninth beautiful path"). A new village Kau Wa Keng San Tsuen (九華徑新村) is located on the western side of the valley and was built following an influx of immigrants from mainland China after World War II and during and after Chinese Civil War.

Before the Japanese occupation of Hong Kong in 1941, the village was one of hiding place for many artists and writers who had fled the mainland, including the Chinese painter Huang Yongyu (黃永玉).

== Transportation ==
Lai King Hill Road, a road following the former shore line of Kau Wa Keng, is the main road connecting the area to Kwai Chung and Lai Chi Kok.

== Education ==
Kau Wa Keng is in Primary One Admission (POA) School Net 65, which includes multiple aided schools (schools operated independently of the government but funded with government money); none of the schools in the net are government schools.
