= Far East Bank =

- 遠東銀行
- Merged into: Hong Nin Savings Bank
- Successor: First Pacific Bank
- Formation: 1959
- Founder: Deacon Chiu (邱德根)
- Founded at: Tsuen Wan, British Hong Kong
- Dissolved: 1992
- Type: Bank
- Legal status: Defunct

Far East Bank
- Traditional Chinese: 遠東銀行
Transcriptions
Yue: Cantonese
- Yale Romanization: Yúhn dūng ngàhn hòhng
- Jyutping: Jyun5 dung1 ngan4 hong4

Far East Bank was a bank in Hong Kong which has since merged into Bank of East Asia.

Far East Bank was founded in 1959 by Mr. Deacon Chiu (邱德根), the founder of Far East Holdings. It started as a qianzhuang (native bank) in Tsuen Wan by collecting deposits from farmers. In the 1960s, it suffered heavily from heavy lending to property sector and fraud. In 1965, bank runs occurred in several small and medium banks in Hong Kong, which eventually triggered the stock market crash in 1965. By order of the British Hong Kong government, the bank was aided by The Hongkong and Shanghai Banking Corporation until it was acquired by First National City Bank in 1969. In 1992, the bank was acquired by First Pacific and merged to Hong Nin Savings Bank to form First Pacific Bank.

In 2000, First Pacific Bank was acquired by the Bank of East Asia. In 2002, the bank was merged into Bank of East Asia.
