= Districts of Hong Kong =

- List of districts of Hong Kong: 1. Islands; 2. Kwai Tsing; 3. North; 4. Sai Kung; 5. Sha Tin; 6. Tai Po; 7. Tsuen Wan; 8. Tuen Mun; 9. Yuen Long; 10. Kowloon City; 11. Kwun Tong; 12. Sham Shui Po; 13. Wong Tai Sin; 14. Yau Tsim Mong; 15. Central and Western; 16. Eastern; 17. Southern; 18. Wan Chai
- Category: Administrative division
- Location: Hong Kong
- Number: 18 districts
- Populations: 137,122 (Islands) – 607,544 (Sha Tin)
- Areas: 10 km^{2} (4 sq mi) (Yau Tsim Mong District) – 220 km^{2} (84 sq mi) (North District)
- Government: District Councils
- Subdivisions: Constituency

Hong Kong is administratively divided into 18 districts. Each district has a district council.

District councils were formerly called district boards, for which the boards were established in 1982, when Hong Kong was under British rule. However, the districts have limited relevance to the population, as few public services operate according to district boundaries. The police, fire services, health services, education and hospital authorities, and postal service each define their own idiosyncratic geographic divisions.

== History ==
In the 1860s, residents speaking the same dialects were often grouped together, and social structure was more important than district structure. Merchants often travelled together as guilds and sold common goods across different areas. Organizations such as Nam Pak Hong, Tung Wah Hospital Committee and "District Watch Committee" often cut across any native district lines. The concept of boundary separation only became important around 1870, when cultural conflicts increased between coolies, Chinese and the British. One of the first legal attempt to control districts came in 1888 under the European District Reservation Ordinance, which reserved areas exclusively to Europeans. The first Town Planning Ordinance did not appear until 1939.

The New Territories and New Kowloon became part of Hong Kong since 1898. The colonial government appoints District Officer to oversee the area. At first the Northern District Officer was stationed in Tai Po. The Northern District and Southern District was later split into Islands District Office, Tuen Mun District Office, Yuen Long District Office, Sai Kung District Office, etc.

Following the appointment of district officers in urban Hong Kong, Kowloon and New Kowloon since 1968, the District Administration Scheme was implemented in 1982 with the establishment of a district board and a district management committee in each of the districts in Hong Kong, including Hong Kong Island, Kowloon and aforementioned the New Territories. The aim of the scheme is to achieve a more effective co-ordination of government activities in the provision of services and facilities at the district level, ensure that the Government is responsive to district needs and problems and promote public participation in district affairs. From 1 July 1997 to 31 December 1999, the former district boards were replaced by provisional district boards. The provisional district boards were in turn replaced on 1 January 2000, with 18 district councils.

There have been two major changes on district divisions since their implementation in 1982:

1. Kwai Tsing District split off from Tsuen Wan District in 1985.
2. Yau Tsim District and Mong Kok District merged to become Yau Tsim Mong District in 1994.

There were also alterations to the borders between Sham Shui Po and Kwai Tsing districts, which used to straddle across Nob Hill since its development on the site of the former Lai Chi Kok Amusement Park, in 2006, and between Eastern and Wan Chai districts, which involved reallocation of the Tin Hau and the Victoria Park constituencies in 2014. The borders between Sham Shui Po with that of Kwai Tsing and Yau Tsim Mong were also altered after new land reclamation projects in the 1990s made it necessary to redraw the previous sea borders over newly formed land. The border between Yau Tsim Mong and Kowloon City districts was altered following reclamation of Hung Hom Bay in the 1990s.

== Districts ==
Hong Kong in administration consists of three areas (區域), which was further divided into 18 districts (地區). The three areas are: Hong Kong Island, Kowloon, and the New Territories. The New Territories has the most districts (9), followed by Kowloon (5), and lastly Hong Kong Island (4).

The population density per district varies from 1,021 (Islands) to 59,704 (Kwun Tong) per km^{2}. Before the combination of Mong Kok and Yau Tsim districts in 1995, Mong Kok District had the highest density (~120,000/km^{2}).

No.	District	Chinese	Area (km^{2})	Population (2021)	Population Growth (From 2011)	Density (/km^{2})
1	Islands	離島區	182.74	185,282	+31.1%	1,021
2	Kwai Tsing	葵青區	23.34	495,798	–3.0%	21,246
3	North	北區	136.51	309,631	+1.8%	2,269
4	Sai Kung	西貢區	136.34	489,037	+12.0%	3,771
5	Sha Tin	沙田區	69.27	692,806	+9.9%	10,082
6	Tai Po	大埔區	148.19	316,470	+6.6%	2,325
7	Tsuen Wan	荃灣區	62.62	320,094	+5.1%	5,168
8	Tuen Mun	屯門區	87.54	506,879	+4.0%	5,908
9	Yuen Long	元朗區	138.56	668,080	+15.5%	4,825
New Territories subtotal			986.10	3,984,077	+7.9%	4,137
10	Kowloon City	九龍城區	10.02	410,634	+15.5%	40,994
11	Kwun Tong	觀塘區	11.28	673,166	+8.8%	59,704
12	Sham Shui Po	深水埗區	9.36	431,090	+13.2%	47,067
13	Wong Tai Sin	黃大仙區	9.30	406,802	–3.2%	43,730
14	Yau Tsim Mong	油尖旺區	6.99	310,647	+0.9%	44,458
Kowloon subtotal			46.95	2,232,339	+5.9%	47,557
15	Central and Western	中西區	12.55	235,953	–6.2%	18,808
16	Eastern	東區	18.13	529,603	–5.4%	29,440
17	Southern	南區	39.40	263,278	–5.5%	6,779
18	Wan Chai	灣仔區	10.64	166,695	–8.2%	15,791
Hong Kong Island subtotal			80.72	1,195,529	–5.9%	14,957
Land total			1,113.76	7,411,945	+4.8%	6,801
Marine			1,641.21	1,125	–5.3%	–
Total			2,754.97	7,413,070	+4.8%	6,782

== Statistics ==
The map depicting population density of Hong Kong by district

=== List of districts by unemployment rate ===
Districts	2004 (%)	2003 (%)	2000 (%)
Kwai Tsing	9.5	11.9	6.1
North	8.7	10.5	5.9
Tuen Mun	8.4	10.6	5.6
Yuen Long	8.4	12.3	5.1
Sham Shui Po	10.3	6.1	
Kwun Tong	8.0	9.7	5.3
Wong Tai Sin	7.9	9.1	6.9
Tai Po	7.8	10.3	5.9
Sha Tin	6.9	8.3	4.9
Islands	6.5	7.1	2.5
Sai Kung	6.3	7.5	4.0
Yau Tsim Mong	6.3	9.8	5.5
Tsuen Wan	5.7	7.3	4.5
Kowloon City	5.5	6.9	3.9
Eastern	5.1	6.0	4.0
Central and Western	4.0	4.4	3.4
Southern	4.5	6.6	4.7
Wan Chai	7.0	5.2	3.0
Hong Kong	7.0	8.8	5.0

* Source from the Census and Statistics Department, data taken from Ming Pao dated 1 May 2005.

=== List of districts by median monthly household income ===
Districts	Median monthly household income (HK$)
Wan Chai	44,100
Central and Western	41,400
Sai Kung	36,500
Eastern	34,300
Southern	32,800
Tsuen Wan	32,600
North	30,400
Kowloon City	30,000
Yau Tsim Mong	30,000
Sha Tin	29,700
Islands	28,400
Yuen Long	27,000
Tai Po	25,800
Wong Tai Sin	25,500
Tuen Mun	25,000
Kwai Tsing	24,700
Sham Shui Po	24,300
Kwun Tong	22,500

* 2019 figures, source from the Census and Statistics Department.

== Management structure ==
District Office
District Officer
Directorate Pay Scale Point 2
Assistant District Officer
Administrative Officer/Senior Administrative Officer
District Management Committee	District Council	District Committees	Care Teams
Chairperson	Chairperson	Chairpersons	Commander
served by District Officer	served by District Officer	elected by committees members	served by District Officer

== The Home Affairs Department ==
The Home Affairs Department is responsible for the District Administration Scheme, community building and community involvement activities, minor environmental improvement projects and minor local public works, and the licensing of hotels and guesthouses, bedspace apartments and clubs. It promotes the concept of effective building management and works closely with other government departments to consistently improve the standard of building management in Hong Kong. It monitors the provision of new arrival services and identifies measures to meet the needs of new arrivals. It also disseminates information relating to and, where necessary, promotes the public's understanding of major government policies, strategies and development plans; and collects and assesses public opinion on relevant issues affecting the community. These responsibilities are discharged primarily through the 18 district offices covering the whole of Hong Kong.

== District officers ==
As head of each district office, the district officer is the representative of the Hong Kong Special Administrative Region Government at the district level. He has the responsibility of overseeing directly the operation of the District Administration Scheme in the district. He is charged with implementing and co-ordinating the execution of district programmes, ensuring that the advice of the district council is properly followed up, and promoting residents' participation in district affairs. In addition, he is required to maintain close liaison with different sectors of the community and reflect their concerns and problems to the Government. It is his duty to ensure that district problems are resolved promptly through inter-departmental consultation and co-operation. Also, he acts as a link between the district council and departments and serves as a mediator between them when problems arise. The district officer is also involved with the community at every level. He has a role to mediate in the resolution of disputes between corporate bodies and residents. He performs an advisory and liaison role in providing assistance to building management bodies. He operates a public enquiry service to enable the community to have easy access to services and information provided by government. In emergency situations, the district officer is responsible for co-ordinating various departments' efforts on the ground for ensuring the effective provision of relief services.

== The role of district councils ==
District councils play an essential advisory role on district matters and issues affecting the whole of Hong Kong as appropriate. The functions of a district council are:

- To advise the Government on:
  - matters affecting the well-being of the people in the district;
  - the provision and use of public facilities and services within the district;
  - the adequacy and priorities of government programmes for the district; and
  - the use of public funds allocated to the district for local public works and community activities;
- Where funds are made available for the purpose, to undertake:
  - environmental improvements within the district;
  - the promotion of recreational and cultural activities within the district; and
  - community activities within the district.

The district councils also advise on the management of community centres, which should be in the best interest of the local residents. The district councils initiate, organise and sponsor community involvement projects and activities aimed at enhancing community spirit and social cohesion and promoting the well-being of people in the districts. These range from large-scale district festivals to the formation of local youth choirs and dance troupes. They have also achieved notable success in improving the local environment by undertaking minor environmental improvement projects such as the provision of rest gardens, rain shelters and amenity planting.

In the 2003/04 financial year, $205.6 million has been allocated for the district councils.

== Consultation with district councils ==
Departments send representatives to district council meetings, to consult them and, where appropriate, act on their advice and keep them informed of government policies and programmes in general and, more specifically, of the work of departments in the district and local matters that are likely to affect the livelihood, living environment or well-being of the residents within a district.

== Composition of district councils ==
The eleven-term district councils, comprising 479 members (452 elected, 27 ex officio who are chairmen of the rural committees in the New Territories), commenced on 1 January 2020.

== District management committees ==
The district management committee in each district is chaired by the district officer. It is a government committee consisting of representatives of the core departments in the district, and provides a forum for departments to discuss and resolve district problems. It responds positively to the advice and requests of the district council and submits a comprehensive written report on its work to each meeting of the district council. To enhance communication between the district management committee and the district council, the district council chairman, vice-chairman and chairmen of district council committees are invited to join district management committee as members.

== See also ==
- District councils of Hong Kong
- List of places in Hong Kong
- List of towns in Hong Kong
