= Wah Lai Estate =

Public housing estate in Lai Chi Kok, Hong Kong

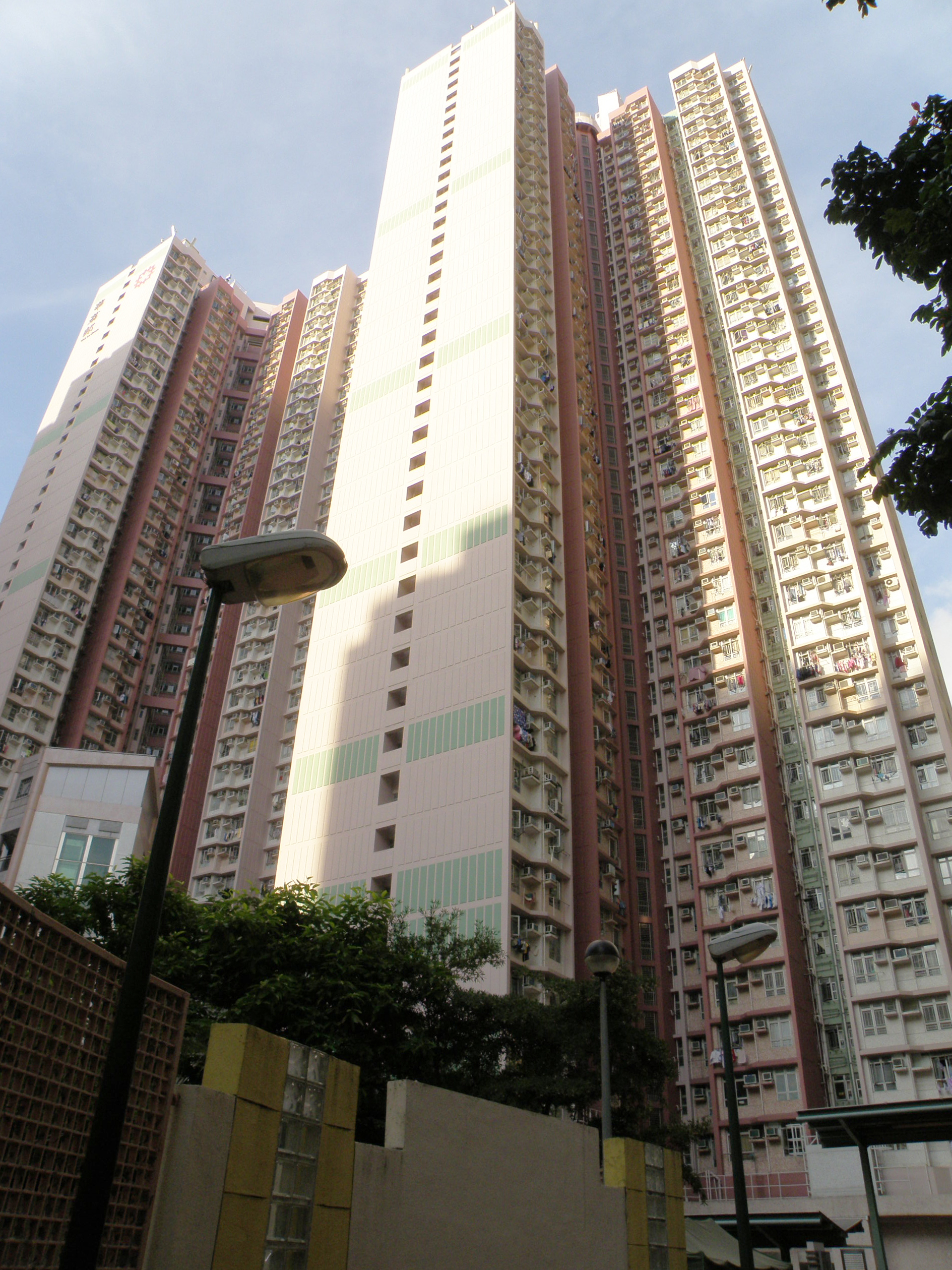
- Wah Lai Estate
- Interactive map of Wah Lai Estate

General information
- Location: 282 Lai King Hill Road, Lai Chi Kok; Kowloon, Hong Kong
- Coordinates: 22.342525°N 114.137542°E
- Status: Completed
- Category: Public rental housing
- Population: 5,711 (2016)
- No. of blocks: 2
- No. of units: 1,517

Construction
- Constructed: 2001; 25 years ago
- Authority: Hong Kong Housing Authority

Wah Lai Estate (Chinese: 華荔邨) is a public housing estate in Lai Chi Kok, Kowloon, Hong Kong. It consists of a total of two residential blocks completed in 2001.

Lai Yan Court (荔欣苑) is a Home Ownership Scheme housing court in Lai Chi Kok near Wah Lai Estate and within walking distance to Mei Foo station. Together with Wah Lai Estate and Nob Hill, it was formerly the site of Lai Chi Kok Amusement Park. It has three residential blocks completed in 2001.

== Background ==
Although it administratively belongs to Kwai Tsing District, it is very near Mei Foo Sun Chuen, Lai Chi Kok rather than other parts in Kwai Chung. Sham Shui Po District Council requested the government to include the estate into its district, but there are still no changes in the boundary related to the estate. However, the government decided to include the entire Nob Hill, a private housing estate next to Wah Lai Estate, into Sham Shui Po District in 2007.

== Houses ==
=== Wah Lai Estate ===
Name	Chinese name	Building type	Completed
Hei Lai House	喜荔樓	Harmony 1	2001
Seung Lai House	賞荔樓	Harmony 1	2001

=== Lai Yan Court ===
Name	Chinese name	Building type	Completed
Lai Ying House	荔影閣	Harmony 1	2001
Lai Choi House	荔采閣	Harmony 1	2001
Lai Lam House	荔林閣	Harmony 1	2001

== Demographics ==
According to the 2016 by-census, Wah Lai Estate had a population of 5,711 while Lai Yan Court had a population of 5,562. Altogether the population amounts to 11,273.

== Politics ==
Wah Lai Estate and Lai Yan Court are located in Lai Wah constituency of the Kwai Tsing District Council. It was formerly represented by Steve Cheung Kwan-kiu, who was elected in the 2019 elections until July 2021.

== See also ==
- Public housing estates in Kwai Chung
