= Deacon Chiu =

Hong Kong entrepreneur

- 邱德根
- Born: Chiu Te-ken; 1 May 1924; Shanghai, Republic of China
- Died: 17 March 2015 (aged 90); Tsuen Wan, Hong Kong
- Occupation: Entrepreneur
- Board member of: Far East Bank; Far East Consortium; Asia Television
- Criminal charge: fraud
- Criminal status: acquitted
- Spouses: Chiu Ju Ching-chu (m. 1948; died 1964) Marion Chiu Ju Ching-lan (m. 1965)
- Children: Dick; David; Margaret; Dennis; Daniel; Derek; Desmond; Duncan

Deacon Chiu Te-ken
- Chinese: 邱德根
Transcriptions
Standard Mandarin
- Hanyu Pinyin: Qiū Dégēn
Yue: Cantonese
- Jyutping: jau1 dak1 gan1

Deacon Chiu Te-ken, JP (Chinese: 邱德根; 1 May 1924 – 17 March 2015) was a Hong Kong entrepreneur. He founded Far East Bank and Far East Consortium and was formerly chairman of Asia Television (ATV).

== Life ==
Chiu was born in Shanghai in 1924 and moved to Hong Kong in 1949. He made his first investment by opening a cinema in a rural area. In 1959, he collected deposits from farmers and opened a qianzhuang (native bank), Far East Bank.

In 1962, he bought the Lai Chi Kok Amusement Park, a major zoo and theme park in the city at the time. He founded and became the chairman of the Far East Consortium in 1972, focusing on property development. The company was listed in 1972 and its sister company, Far East Holdings International which concentrated on investment in Greater China, was listed in 1973. He was also chairman of Far East Hotel and Entertainment, which was listed in 1979.

In 1982, he rose to fame when he bought Rediffusion Television and renamed it Asia Television (ATV), which he sold in 1989. While he was chairman, it was rumoured that ATV staff were told how many pieces of toilet paper they were allowed to use.

In 1986, the group acquired a 34 per cent stake in Far East Holdings from the Chiu family.

In the 1980s, Chiu and his son David were charged with falsifying documents of Far East Bank but the case was dropped in 1993 because he had been diagnosed with Alzheimer's disease. David was later acquitted of fraud charges.

On 8 September 2011, Chiu retired as chairman and was appointed honorary chairman of Far East Consortium International Limited.

Chiu was appointed Justice of the Peace on 20 November 1964 and was appointed to the 6th to 9th Chinese People's Political Consultative Conference, from 1983. He was one of the founders of Yan Chai Hospital and the vice patron of the Community Chest of Hong Kong from 1968, the founder and permanent honorary chairman of the New Territories General Chamber of Commerce. In 1966, he founded and became chairman of Ju Ching Chu Secondary School, named for his first wife.

=== Death ===
On the morning of 17 March 2015, Chiu fainted at his villa in Ting Kau and was declared dead at Yan Chai Hospital in Tsuen Wan, aged 90. On March 18, 2015, to commemorate the passing of Deacon Chiu, Asia Television channel ATV Home broadcast a special program "Miss You Ever Mr. Deacon Chiu Te Ken" (Chinese: 永遠懷念您邱德根先生) from 20:00 to 22:00.

== Family and personal ==
Chiu and his second wife Marion Chiu were both members of the Hong Kong Jockey Club, owning horses Fair Wing, My Time and Wind Winner.

From his two marriages, Chiu had seven sons and one daughter.

In 2020, Liyuan Amusement Garden Co., Ltd., owned by the Chiu Te Ken family, filed a lawsuit against Meili Farm Co., Ltd., alleging that the company operated a barbecue ground on its land in Kau Wa Keng, Mei Foo without approval.

Since 2022, his youngest son Duncan Chiu has been a member of the Legislative Council of Hong Kong.

== In popular culture ==
- The Romancing Star II : 1988 film, Character Mr. Chow, portrayed by Lo Hoi-pang.
- It Could Happen Here - The TV Magnate : 1991 television film, portrayed by Lo Hoi-pang.
