= Nob Hill (Hong Kong) =

Private housing estate in Lai Chi Kok, Hong Kong

Coordinates: 22.3418°N 114.1375°E

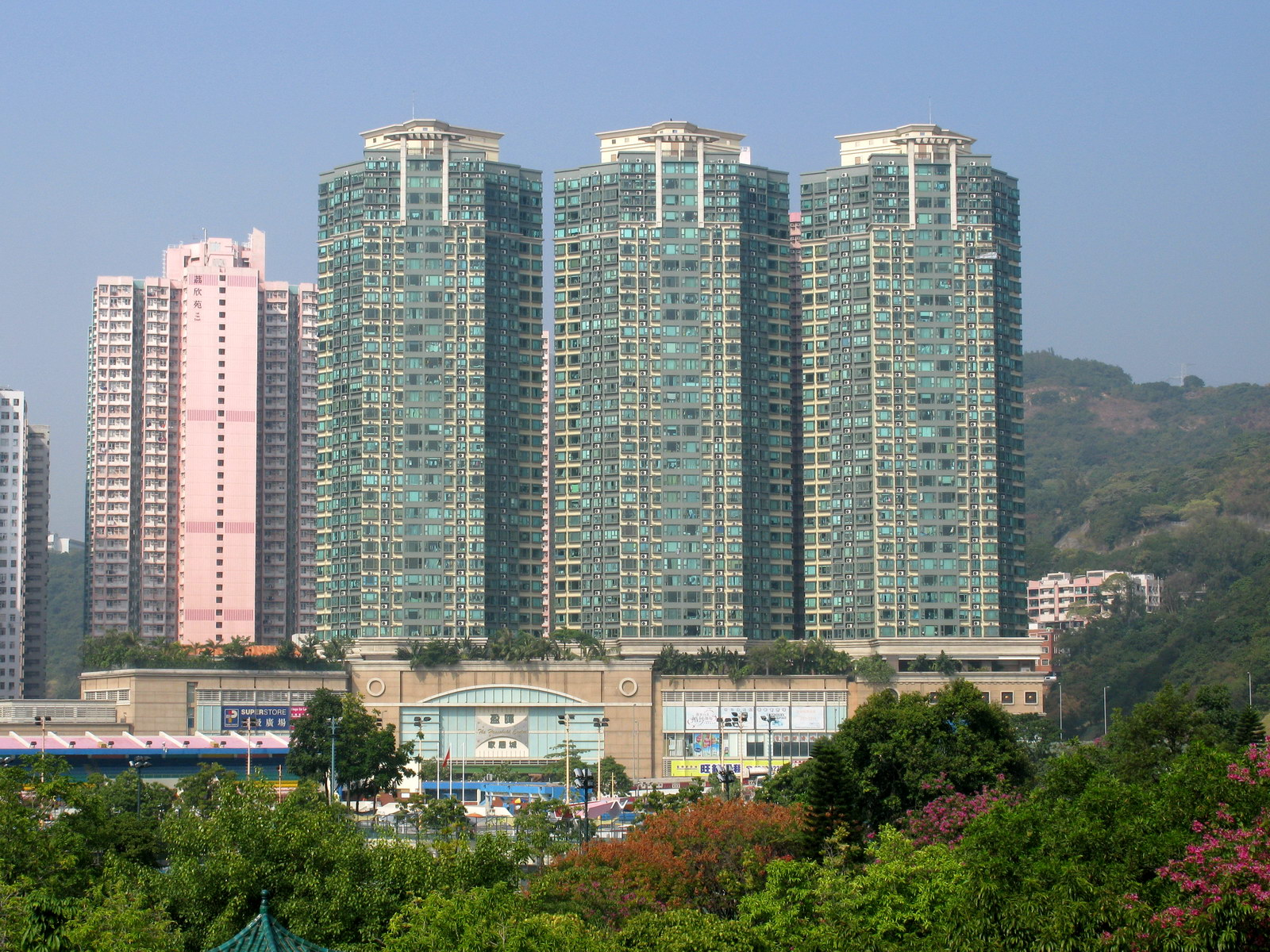
Nob Hill

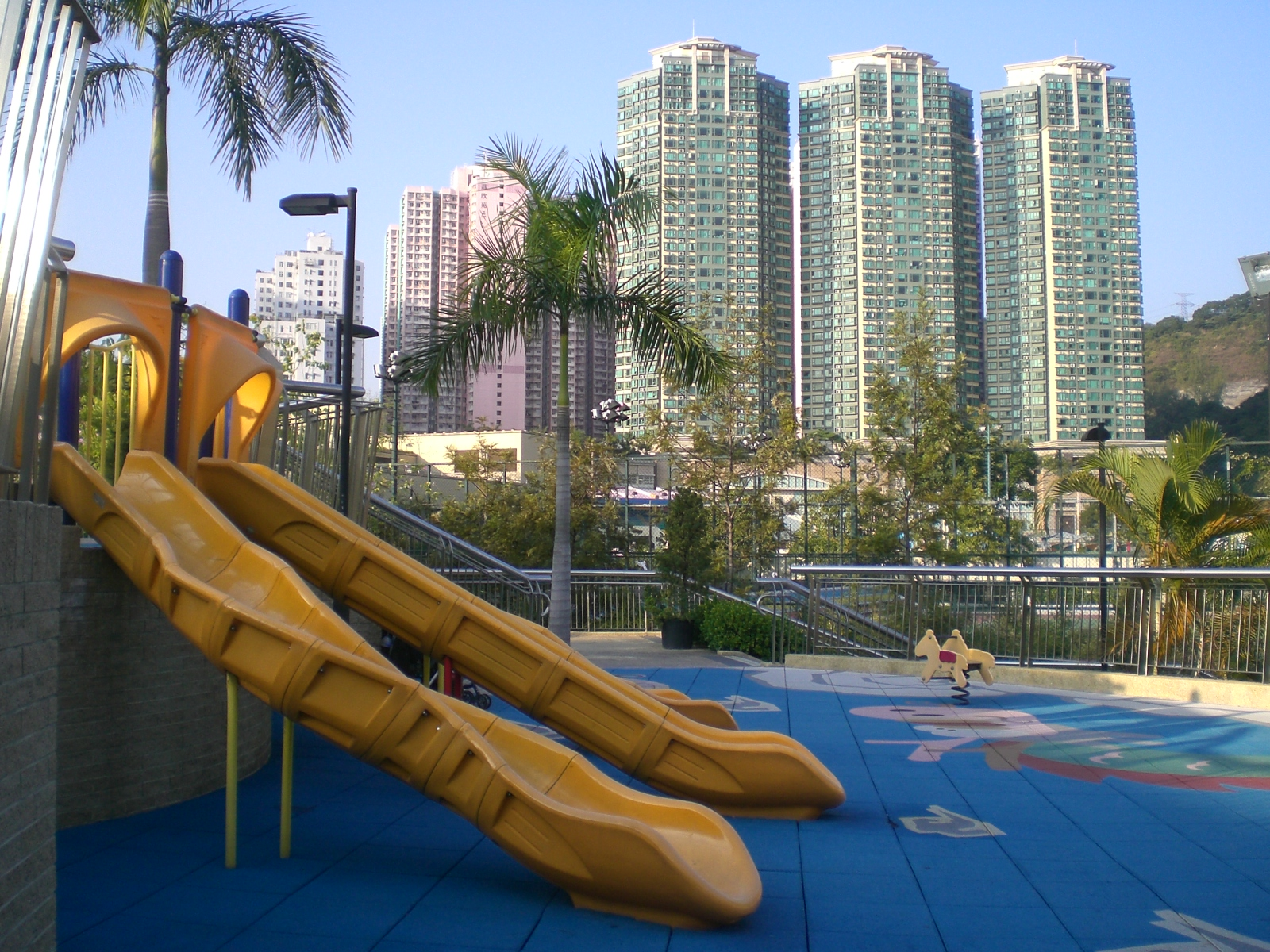
Lai Chi Kok Park and Nob Hill

Nob Hill (Chinese: 盈暉臺) is a private housing estate in Lai Chi Kok, Kowloon, Hong Kong, located at the former site of Lai Chi Kok Amusement Park, together with Wah Lai Estate and Lai Yan Court. It has three residential blocks and a shopping centre. It was jointly developed by Cheung Kong Holdings and Far East Hotels and Entertainment in 2002.

== History ==
Far East Hotels and Entertainment surrendered the Lai Chi Kok Amusement Park and Sung Dynasty Village attractions to the Hong Kong Government in exchange for the 90,000-square foot site that is now home to Nob Hill. The residential estate was developed as a joint venture between Far East and Cheung Kong. The developers also paid a land premium of about $710 million. The development was approved by the Town Planning Board in mid-1996.

== Features ==
Nob Hill has three residential blocks housing a total of 696 flats. The estate's shopping centre, Nob Hill Square, opened in 2002. It has a gross floor area of about 100,600 square feet.

The estate is built above the Lai Chi Kok Bus Terminus.

== District boundary issue ==
Nob Hill straddled at two different districts during the first few years after occupation. Block 1 and Lai Chi Kok Bus Terminus at its ground floor belonged to Sham Shui Po District while Block 2 and 3 belonged to Kwai Tsing District. However, this arrangement caused many inconveniences for handling district council matters. Some residents asked to assign the whole estate into Sham Shui Po District because the estate is near Mei Foo Sun Chuen. As a result, the government decided to put Nob Hill wholly into Sham Shui Po District in 2007.

== See also ==
- Lai Chi Kok Amusement Park
- Wah Lai Estate
