= Hong Nin Savings Bank =

Hong Kong bank

- 康年儲蓄銀行
- Formation: 1921
- Dissolved: 1986
- Location: Hong Kong

Hong Nin Savings Bank
- Traditional Chinese: 康年儲蓄銀行
Transcriptions
Yue: Cantonese
- Yale Romanization: Hōng nìhn chyúh chūk ngàhn hòhng
- Jyutping: Hong1 nin4 cyu5 cuk1 ngan4 hong4

Hong Nin Savings Bank (Traditional Chinese: 康年儲蓄銀行) was a bank in Hong Kong, founded in 1921.

In 1986, the bank had four branches and deposits of about HK$300m (US$38m). The bank was taken over by the colonial Government of Hong Kong, in 1986, due to defaults on several loans related to shipping and dwindling deposits.

In 1987, Hong Nin was acquired by First Pacific and renamed it to First Pacific Bank.
