= Lai Wah (constituency) =

Hong Kong constituency

- Elected constituency for the Kwai Tsing District Council
- Boundary of Lai Wah in Kwai Tsing District
- District: Kwai Tsing
- Legislative Council constituency: New Territories South West
- Population: 15,916 (2019)
- Electorate: 8,686 (2019)

Current constituency
- Created: 2003
- Number of members: One
- Member: vacant
- Created from: Wah Fung

Lai Wah is one of the 31 constituencies of the Kwai Tsing District Council. The seat elects one member of the council every four years. It was created in 2003. Its boundary is loosely based on the Lai Yan Court and Wah Lai Estate.

== Councillors represented ==
Election	Member	Party
2003	Lee Wing-tat	Democratic
2007	Lee Wing-tat	Democratic
2011	Chu Lai-ling	DAB
2015	Chu Lai-ling	DAB
2019	Steve Cheung Kwan-kiu→vacant	Civic→Independent

== Election results ==
=== 2010s ===
Kwai Tsing District Council Election, 2019: Lai Wah
Party	Candidate	Votes	%	±%
Civic (PfD)	Steve Cheung Kwan-kiu	3,613	56.18	
DAB	Chu Lai-ling	2,818	43.82	
Majority		795	12.36	
Turnout		6,460	74.39	
Civic gain from DAB		Swing		

Kwai Tsing District Council Election, 2015: Lai Wah
Party	Candidate	Votes	%	±%
DAB	Chu Lai-ling	Unopposed		
DAB hold		Swing		

Kwai Tsing District Council Election, 2011: Lai Wah
Party	Candidate	Votes	%	±%
DAB	Chu Lai-ling	1,923	50.1	+11.4
Democratic	Lee Wing-tat	1,582	41.2	−19.2
People Power (Power Voters)	Ray Chan Chi-chuen	333	8.7	
DAB gain from Democratic		Swing	+15.3	

=== 2000s ===
Kwai Tsing District Council Election, 2007: Lai Wah
Party	Candidate	Votes	%	±%
Democratic	Lee Wing-tat	1,349	60.4	−2.1
DAB	Yeung Man-tat	885	39.6	+18.7
Democratic hold		Swing	-10.4	

Kwai Tsing District Council Election, 2003: Lai Wah
Party	Candidate	Votes	%	±%
Democratic	Lee Wing-tat	2,310	62.5	
DAB	Chan Chan-chung	772	20.9	
Nonpartisan	Poon Su-kei	615	16.6	
Democratic win (new seat)				
