= First Pacific Bank =

Former Hong Kong bank

- Native name: 第一太平銀行有限公司
- Company type: Wholly owned subsidiary of FPB Bank Holding Company Limited
- Industry: Banking
- Founded: 1981; 45 years ago
- Defunct: 2002
- Headquarters: Wan Chai, Hong Kong
- Number of employees: 600 (2000)

First Pacific Bank
- Traditional Chinese: 第一太平銀行有限公司
Transcriptions
Yue: Cantonese
- Yale Romanization: Daih yāt taai pìhng ngàhn hòhng yáuh haahn gūng sī
- Jyutping: Dai6 jat1 taai3 ping4 ngan4 hong4 jau5 haan6 gung1 si1

First Pacific Bank Limited was a bank based in Hong Kong. It was a wholly owned subsidiary of the investment holding company FPB Bank Holding Company Limited (FPB Bank Holdco). Its headquarters were in the First Pacific Bank Centre in Wan Chai.

The company's major shareholders were First Pacific Company Limited (FP Company) and MIMET FOTIC Investment Limited (MIMET FOTIC). The company was incorporated in Bermuda in 1993.

Hong Nin Savings Bank was acquired by First Pacific Group from the Government of Hong Kong in 1969.
