= Qianzhuang =

Historical private banks in China

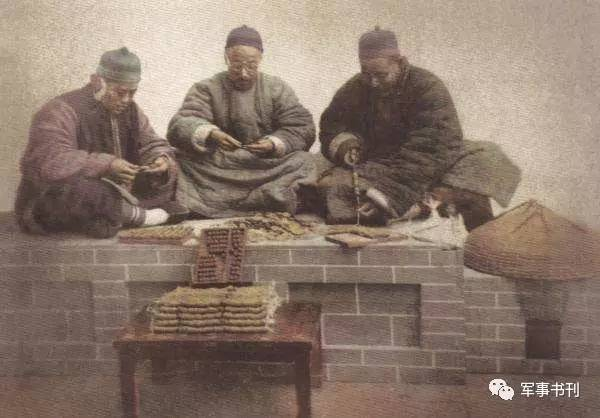
Qiánpù stringing cash coins, which was a typical service offered by the qianzhuang in imperial China.

Qianzhuang (Chinese: 錢莊; Wade–Giles: ch'ien-chuang) were local independent Chinese banks in the early modern period, as distinguished from the nationwide bank networks headquartered in Shanxi province called the "Shanxi banks" or piaohao. These banks first sprung up during the Ming dynasty but greatly expanded during the Qing dynasty. Unlike the Shanxi banks, the qianzhuang tended to have much more risky business practices.

These institutions first appeared in the Yangzi Delta region, in Shanghai, Ningbo, and Shaoxing, in the mid-eighteenth century. In 1776, several of these banks in Shanghai organised themselves into the banking guild known as the Qianye Gongsuo. In contrast to piaohao, most qianzhuang were local commercial banks conducting local money exchange, issuing cash notes, and exchanging bills and notes. Qianzhuang maintained close relationships with Chinese merchants, and grew with the expansion of China's foreign trade. When Western banks first entered China, they issued "chop loans" (彩票, caipiao) to the qianzhuang, who would then lend this money to Chinese merchants who used it to purchase goods from foreign firms. During the latter half of the 19th century the qianzhuang were intermediaries between Chinese merchants and foreign banks. Unlike the Shanxi banks, the qianzhuang survived the Xinhai Revolution because of their close relationships with foreign banks.

It is estimated that there were around 10,000 qianzhuang in China in the early 1890s. There were several financial crashes which occurred in China during which a large number of qianzhuang closed; the largest of these occurred in the years 1883, 1910, and 1911. By and by the traditional qianzhuang banks were being replaced by modern credit banks in China, particularly those residing in Shanghai. This would continue to happen well into the Republican period. The last qianzhuang banks were nationalised in 1952 by the government of the People's Republic of China.

During the 1990s qianzhuang made a come back in mainland China; these new qianzhuang are informal financial companies which are often operating just within the edges of what is legal. The government attitude towards these new qianzhuang isn't that much different from their attitude in the 1950s.

== Regional names for private banks in China ==
Qianzhuang had a variety of regional names across China. The name qianzhuang was typically used for banks and bank-like institutions in the region around the lower Yangtze river. The terms yinhao and qianpu were more typically used in Northern China especially in cities like Beijing, Tianjin, Shenyang, Jinan, and Zhengzhou. In southern China qianzhuang was also often called qianju or qiandian (both of which could be translated as "money store"). Meanwhile, all terms were used in the cities of Xuzhou, Hankou, Chongqing, and Chengdu. In Hankou alone the qianzhuang were referred to by a long list of aliases including qianpu, qianzhuo, qiantan, yinju, yinlou, yinpu, and yin lufang in the local archives.

== Structure of the qianzhuang ==
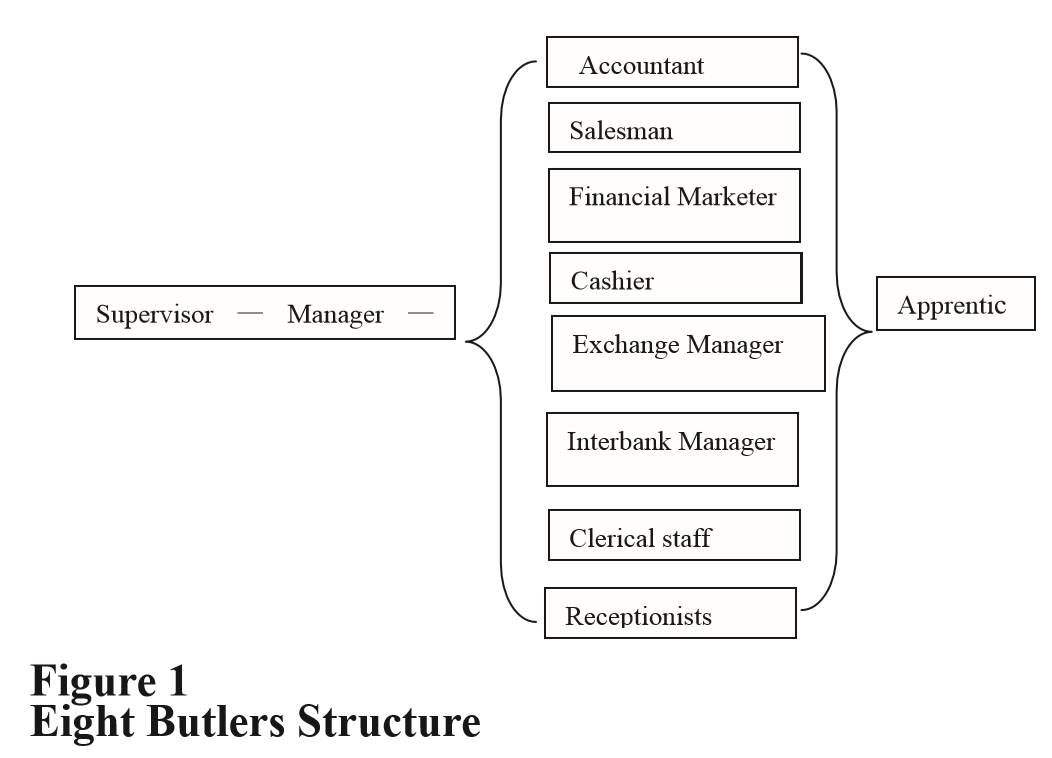
The "Eight Butlers" structure of the qianzhuang.

The basic organisational structure of the qianzhuang was based on a system known as the "Eight Butlers structure". The most important and powerful staff member of a qianzhuang was the manager who was responsible for most decisions that were made by the bank such as dealing with daily trifles, business transactions, and the transfer of staff members. Because of the power the manager held the shareholders had to make sure that they'd always hire the most qualified individual for the task, as this job required a great deal of trust and the selection process had to be done as carefully as possible to ensure that the most qualified manager headed the operation. Some shareholders would appoint supervisors to supervise these managers to make sure that they always had the best interest of the shareholders in mind and could report anything to the shareholders at any time.

Many qianzhuang also hired several associates to assist the manager, and the number of staff from each position as low as apprentice to as high as manager was never certain, as all employees are shifted according to both the scale and the focus of the business. Staff members of a qianzhuang were either hired directly by the shareholders or were recommended by managers. It is only natural that such an organisational structure can not only maintain the authority of the management, but could also implement policies and guidelines effectively. This structure also allowed for there to be plenty of flexibly so the qianzhuang were highly adaptable to changing circumstances. There were not only checks and balances between the same level of authority, but there were also a number of supervisory constraints between the upper and lower levels of the staff; this was done as a way to enhance the ability of qianzhuang enterprises to withstand more risks.

This could lead to misconduct or embezzlement; thus the intervals of internal auditing and dividend distributing were synchronized afterwards. The western double-entry method was slowly adapted to replace the traditional ones. Usually around 2/3 of the net earnings went to owners of the business, and the remaining profits went to employees, but the chief manager would still decide how to distribute the bonus packages. Normally, the chief manager would take 20% to 30% of the total bonus; the others shared the rest based on both performance and their status within the company hierarchy.

Between the years of 1926 and 1927 a large percentage of the qianzhuang of Hankou shifted their structures of ownership; nominally these qianzhuang held an unlimited liability, but many of them evolved from sole-proprietorship to partnerships.

The creation of the "armpit partnership" model allowed for those who wished to avoid any attention by the authorities to join the very lucrative qianzhuang business. A united voice of "armpit partners" also had the power to protect their pecuniary interests from being funnelled to the dominating partners. This model of "armpit partnerships" would serve a defensive mechanism (or a modus vivendi), enticing the Hankou qianzhuang to make more business allies under political gauntlets.

=== Hankou ===
The Hankou qianzhuang guilds were established sometime before or in the year 1894 as mediators for the Hankou qianzhuang as the high number of qianzhuang made the scene overcrowded. In Hankou two separate guilds for the qianzhuang coexisted simultaneously. One concerned itself only with Confucian rituals and ritualistic events while the other handled all mundane issues.

Between the years 1938 and 1945 the city of Hankou was occupied by the Japanese during the Second Sino-Japanese War (which would later become a theatre of World War II), the Hankou qianzhuang guild managed to continue operating despite the foreign occupation. Many local qianzhuang chose to collaborate with the Japanese during the occupation; dozens of these qianzhuang were facing jeopardy following the surrender of Japan in 1945.

=== Shanghai ===
In the treaty port city of Shanghai the qianzhuang were all members of a two guilds organised by them based on their location in the city. The guilds responsible for the Shanghai qianzhuang operated as two geographical bodies parallel to each other; the one for northern Shanghai was called the Bei Huiguan (北會館, "Northern guild hall") and the one for southern Shanghai was called the Nan Gongsuo (南公所, "Southern industry office"). These two guilds handled things like the draft-exchange business practiced among their members separately. There was another guild body named the Neiyuan (內園, "inner garden") which coordinated the south–north draft-exchange as a joint agency of both Shanghai qianzhuang guilds.

=== National guild ===
In 1947 the Shanghai qianzhuang guild invited the guilds from the cities of Hangzhou, Ningbo, Nanjing, Hankou, Chongqing, Beiping, and Tianjin to form a national Chinese qianzhuang guild. This national guild would gain members from 38 other cities in October of the same year as it began to expand; one of the reasons why more cities started joining this national qianzhuang guild was as a defense against the uncontrollable hyperinflation which had struck China during the 1940s following the end of World War II.

The national qianzhuang guild served as a loose coalition and existed for five years before undergoing the same fate as all qianzhuang in China. Some of the efforts of this national Chinese guild include establishing a joint reserve for the issuance of new banknotes by both commercial banks and qianzhuang; however, this proposal never came to fruition due to the chaos of the Chinese Civil War.

== History ==
=== Imperial China ===
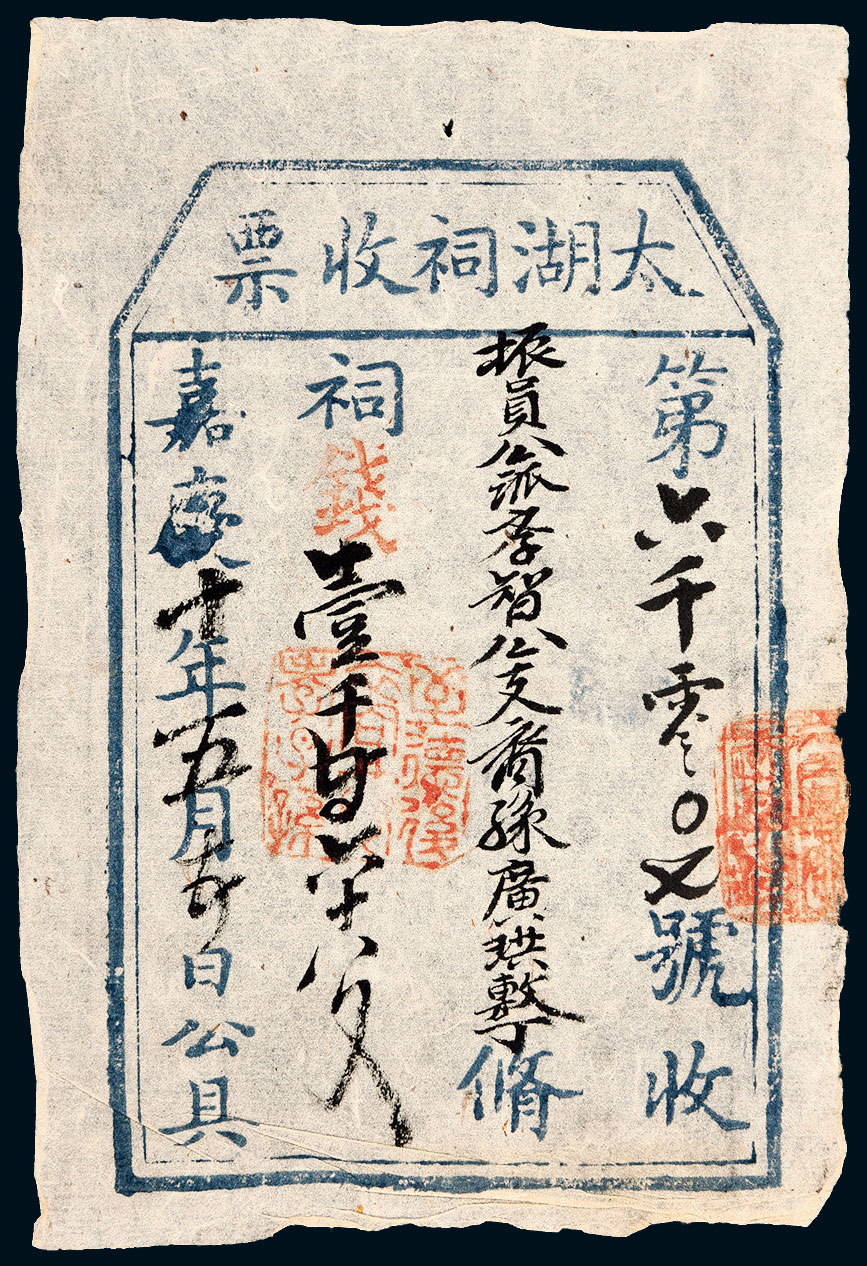
A Zhuangpiao of 1068 wén issued by the Lake Tai ancestral temple in the year Jiaqing 10 (1805).

The earliest qianzhuang were established during the Ming dynasty. These early private banks would be operate either as a single proprietorship known as duzi (獨資) or as a joint proprietorship known as hehuo (合伙). Most qianzhuang tended to be small proprietorships which had unlimited liability, these local banks were often sparsely aligned along family and linguistic ties and they were rarely patronised by the local government authorities. A large number of these early ventures were simply a business that some merchants families kept on the side and a few of them were also seen as an investment of government officials or those who belonged to the landowning gentry. The larger qianzhuang would change money, operate deposits, make loans to traders, care for remittances, and in some cases issue their own scrip known as Zhuangpiao (莊票) and Yinqianpiao (銀錢票, "silver money notes"). Larger qianzhuang would issue company scrip against individual deposits, this scrip was also accepted by proximate shops but to cash these out would take around 10–15 days after it was given to the shop, this was because couriers would have to liaise with the issuing shop in order to rule out fraudulent Zhuangpiao notes.

The first documented qianzhuang banking institution of Beijing was the Yinhao Huiguan (銀號會館, "bankers' guild hall"), this bank had a shrine called Zhengyisi (正已祠) in its building, the Yinhao Huiguan was first mentioned in 1667 under the reign of the Manchu Qing dynasty. The first qianzhuang in Shanghai was founded seven decades later in 1736 was named the Qianye Gongsuo (錢業公所, "money industry office"). The primary business of the qianzhuang was giving out loans in the Chinese hinterland to promote trade and the exchange of commodities with the coastal regions of China. Many qianzhuang engaged in the business exchanging copper-alloy cash coins and silver sycees and foreign coins and vice versa as China used a bimetallic currency system with fluctuating exchange rates. number of coins in a single string was locally determined as in one district a string could consist of 980 cash coins, while in another district this could only be 965 cash coins, these numbers were based on the local salaries of the qiánpù. During the Qing dynasty the qiánpù would often search for older and rarer coins to sell these to coin collectors at a higher price. Remittances by qianzhuang would be carried out using a vast network of partner institutes, the owners of these other financial institutes would often hail from the same region, yet most of these small private banks would only operate locally. Comparatively, the financial landscape of northern China was very much focused on the imperial Chinese government. The qianzhuang were the main financial institutions serving as intermediaries between the Europeans and the Chinese for financial purposes.

The qianzhuang had two kinds of their own funds, one is the equity capital, the other is the demand deposit in firm deposited by the owning shareholders, which is called copy or passport. Because the shareholders of a qianzhuang often own many firms, their deposits in one firm are often variable. And the different qianzhuang owned by the same shareholders would often pay for the other's deposits if it had insufficient funds.

Under the reign of the Jiaqing Emperor a central banking institute was founded in the city of Tianjin named the Yinhao Gongsuo (銀號公所).

There were 106 financial institutions founded in the last quarter of the eighteenth century.

Until the Xinhai Revolution deposed of the Qing dynasty in 1911, the dominant financial and banking institutions in China were the Shanxi banks (piaohao, which could be translated as "remittance houses"), the Shanxi banks specialised in long-distance money remittances which they would engage in on behalf of agencies of the Qing government or to dispatch of government officials' emoluments. In the middle of the nineteenth century the qianzhuang started making more short-term loans to cash strapped local governments, invested more into national funds, and started issuing shares. The qianzhuang and piaohao ("Shanxi banks") were created out of different circumstances; while the piaohao were created out of a necessity for long-distance remittance, the qianzhuang were originally created for the silver-specie exchange market. Because of this, the scope of business of the qianzhuang was very dissimilar to that of the Shanxi banks, the qianzhuang tended to make their profits from relatively high interest rates which they would charge on unsecured loans to medium-range merchants, while the Shanxi banks subsisted their profits more on draft commission. Because of these different business models, some Shanxi banks were known to deposit some of their idle funds in qianzhuang interest-bearing accounts, this meant that the general relationship between the qianzhuang and the Shanxi banks was one of cooperation and complementarity rather than of confrontational competition.

In the city of Hankou the piaohao were prosperous before the qianzhuang were, this might have been due to connections with the political circle. Less is known about the origins of the Hankou qianzhuang which could be either due to the immense number of aliases used to describe qianzhuang or the fact that the Qing government wasn't good at record keeping during this early era. The trade conducted by qianzhuang in Hankou is locally referred to as Yin-Qian (銀錢). Between the years 1841 and 1850 the Hankou qianzhuang were dominated by merchants from the Jiangxi province; the larger qianzhuang from this era had an average benqian (本錢, "principal capital") which ranged between 6000 and 10,000 taels of silver, and on average they issued hundreds of thousands of Huapiao (匯票, "remittance notes") banknotes for circulation.

The economic centre of gravity of the Qing dynasty began to shift during the 1850s from the port of Guangzhou, Guangdong to Shanghai. During the chaos of the Taiping Rebellion many Chinese government officials and affluent landlords were forced to flee their lands as it was being occupied by the advancing Taiping Heavenly Kingdom, many of these refugees would flee to the Bund in Shanghai's foreign concessions. This led to the qianzhuang of Shanghai in taking up real estate investment and stock exchange speculation expanding and diversifying their business scope. During the 1860s the qianzhuang of Shanghai started looking to the foreign banking companies (Note: Foreign banks operating in China were referred to as either Yanghang (洋行) or Waishang Yinhang (外商銀行) by the indigenous population.) as a source of capital. As foreign banks began investing more into the Chinese market, these foreign banking companies would fulfill the need for money that local Chinese banks had at the time by issuing short-term loans known as zhekuan (拆款, "interbank loans") to them. These loans were necessary as monetary volume of most qianzhuang banks usually was around 70,000 taels of silver or less. By the year 1888 sixty two of the largest qianzhuang had engaged in borrowing millions of taels in silver in loans from foreign banks on a yearly basis. The Qianzhuang on-lent funds from foreign banking companies to Chinese traders and merchants who engaged in the wholesale of imported products until these merchants would sell their stock and were able to pay off their debts. This method of on-call credit from foreign banks were known as chop loans (彩票, chaipiao). This newfound relationship between the qianzhuang and foreign banks would be mutually beneficial as this allowed for the traditional Chinese banks to serve as intermediaries between them and Chinese merchants or the Qing government making them invaluable for foreigners doing business in China.

European and Japanese banks had the ability to readily lay down funds in the Chinese treaty ports because these banks had established exclusive relationships with native foreign trading houses. These foreign trading houses in China were ever ready to exchange local money for sterling notes. Compared to the diffuse qianzhuang, these foreign banks were otherwise much better capitalised, this meant that the monetary credit that they advanced reinvigorated the foreign trade at the Chinese treaty ports, which would often lapse into patterns of barter.

The Sino-French War between 1883 and 1885 had many Chinese people to run on the qianzhuang to withdraw their savings, in Shanghai alone this run on the banks had caused 10 qianzhuang to close.

The main narrative around the relationship between the qianzhuang and foreign banking companies historically propagated by Chinese historians such as Zhang Guohui paints the relationship as foreign banks exploiting the native Chinese banks paving the way for foreign inroads into dominating the Chinese economy. In a 2005 article Hamashita Takeshi debunked this narrative by illustrating that the foreign banks which did business in China did not take the majority of the profits made by the qianzhuang and that most of the activity done by the qianzhuang did not involve any chop loans and this activity was even more marginal on the balance sheets of the foreign banks conducting business in China; in fact, at times, the qianzhuang (and other Chinese banks such as the Imperial Bank of China) would even lend money back to foreign banks which requested this on call.

During the latter half of the 19th century Shanghai had large native Chinese banks which were credit institutions and smaller native Chinese banks that were non-credit institutions, these smaller banks were divided into 4 classes these classes were based on a kind of numeration following the first words of the Confucian classic literary text, the I Ching, these 4 classes were the yuan (元), heng (亨), li (利), and the zhen (貞). The yuan banks and the heng banks operated as assayers and as money-changers or tiaoda qianzhuang (挑打錢莊), while the li banks and the zhen banks operated exclusively as cash coin-changers or lingdui qianzhuang (零兌錢莊).

In the year 1883 the tycoon Hu Xueyan from the province of Zhejiang, who had a business network which covered most of the southern regions of China, was forced to declare bankruptcy following a disastrous business decision. Hu Xueyan spent millions of taels to purchase raw silk to try to get a monopoly on the silk trade, unfortunately for Hu Xueyan, foreigners started boycotting him causing him to sell the silk at prices below the ones for acquisition bankrupting him in the process. This whole ordeal caused Hu to become unable to pay the 560,000 taels of silver that his company owed to 40 different Shanghai qianzhuang. The default on these loans resulted in most of these Shanghai qianzhuang going bankrupt, furthermore hundreds of other Chinese companies were also folding due to an economic ripple effect as they now could no longer get the loans they needed to do business from these bankrupted outlets. The chain effect led to a major financial downturn in the economy of Shanghai. In the year 1876 there were a total of 105 registered qianzhuang in Shanghai but by 1883, the year of the crash, only 20 qianzhuang had survived in all of Shanghai.

It took well over a decade for the qianzhuang industry to restore itself following this debacle, but only 11 years later in 1894 the market was hit heavily by another crisis. During this time a large number of companies engaged in Qing China's lucrative opium business were quite willing to pay high interest rates for loans. In order to attract cash savings, some qianzhuang would sell zhuangpiao at high interest rates ranging from 2% to 20%. Some qianzhuang would even offer a staggering number of 50% interest rates on their zhuangpiao. This situation would face a quick downturn when in the year 1894 several qianzhuang started to fraudulently declare bankruptcy as a means to avoid paying out the promised interest rates on the zhuangpiao. This led to a total of 2,000,000 taels of silver in zhuangpiao being rendered without value, this event would cause many Chinese people to see the qianzhuang as disreputable and untrustworthy.

Around the year 1890 the larger Chinese banks in Shanghai had developed a form of clearance management known as the gongdan zhidu (公單制度) which occurred on a daily basis, during the gongdan zhidu the banks of Shanghai would meet in the afternoon in a huihua zonghui (匯劃總會, or clearing house) and would then proceed to clear their holdings of letters of exchange and banknotes, this allowed them to settle all the claims and liabilities of their accounts for that day.

While both mainland European and Japanese banks were latecomers into the Chinese market, these banks were also a lot more ready to engage the domestic Chinese sector. Kwan Man Bun showed how foreign banks such as the French (Saigon, French Indochina-based) Banque de l'Indochine, Russian Russo-Chinese Bank, and Japanese Yokohama Specie Bank were pivotal in helping Chinese salt merchants in Tianjin tide over their losses due to the Boxer Rebellion.

There were large disparities between the structures of both Chinese qianzhuang banks and the overall Chinese banking sector and how foreign banks operated in China, this was partially due to the geographical distribution of the different kinds of banks. An advantage which Chinese banks like the qianzhuang had over foreign banks was the fact that they had leeway to popularise their banknotes in the vast Chinese hinterland that stretched far beyond the confines of the treaty ports, which the foreign banks were bound to. However, within the treaty ports of China, these foreign banking companies enjoyed extraterritoriality which, unlike the local qianzhuang, protected them from Chinese government intervention. But because they were bound to only Chinese treaty ports most foreign banks would not establish any branches in other Chinese cities, with the notable exception being the capital city of Beijing which was politically both high important and very sensitive.

While the qianzhuang of Shanghai were a very successful story of the modernisation of the Chinese financial landscape, the tycoons who presided over the Shanghai qianzhuang exercised very little to no power in the vast Chinese hinterland and only dominated the banking sector of Eastern China, during the era the city of Tianjin ruled over the banking sector of Northern China, Guangzhou over Southern China, and Hankou over Central China. While Shanghai played an important role, the agricultural trade of China was still heavily dependent on the more traditional qianzhuang of elsewhere. Hankou being a hinterland city would be more affected by the multitudes of local constraints, despite these local constraints Hankou was the second largest business port in all of China behind Shanghai during this period being often called "the Chicago of China" while maintaining intimate ties with Shanghai.

The disparities between the qianzhuang and the foreign banks in China may have also been derived from the overemphasis laid at banknote issuance as a definitive constituent of modern banking by Chinese reformers during the late-Qing dynasty period. These reformers were quick to point out how Qing China's institutional weakness was a reason why foreign banks were enabled to recoup profits from the issuance of fiat banknote in the treaty ports where they were allowed to operate. Foreign banks typically would fail to heed attendant reserve requirements customary in the Chinese banking sector, this was something that set them apart from traditional Chinese financial institutions such as the qianzhuang. The reformers of the late-Qing dynasty era would plead to the Emperor to create government-run banks which would be able to counter foreign economic inroads into the Chinese economy. Despite seeking to modernise both the Chinese banking sector and economy, the arguments put forward by these reformers were not materially different from the arguments made by earlier Qing bureaucrats who had attempted to persuade the Manchu administration to overprint the failed Great Qing Treasure Note and Hubu Guanpiao banknotes as panacea for the dynastic decline leading to the Xianfeng inflation. But as the monetary discourse had been altered so much during this period that while the reformers in the 1850s had been castigated for their suggestions, the reformers in the 1890s could make more daring propositions with impunity, such as proposing that the Chinese government should adopt the gold standard.

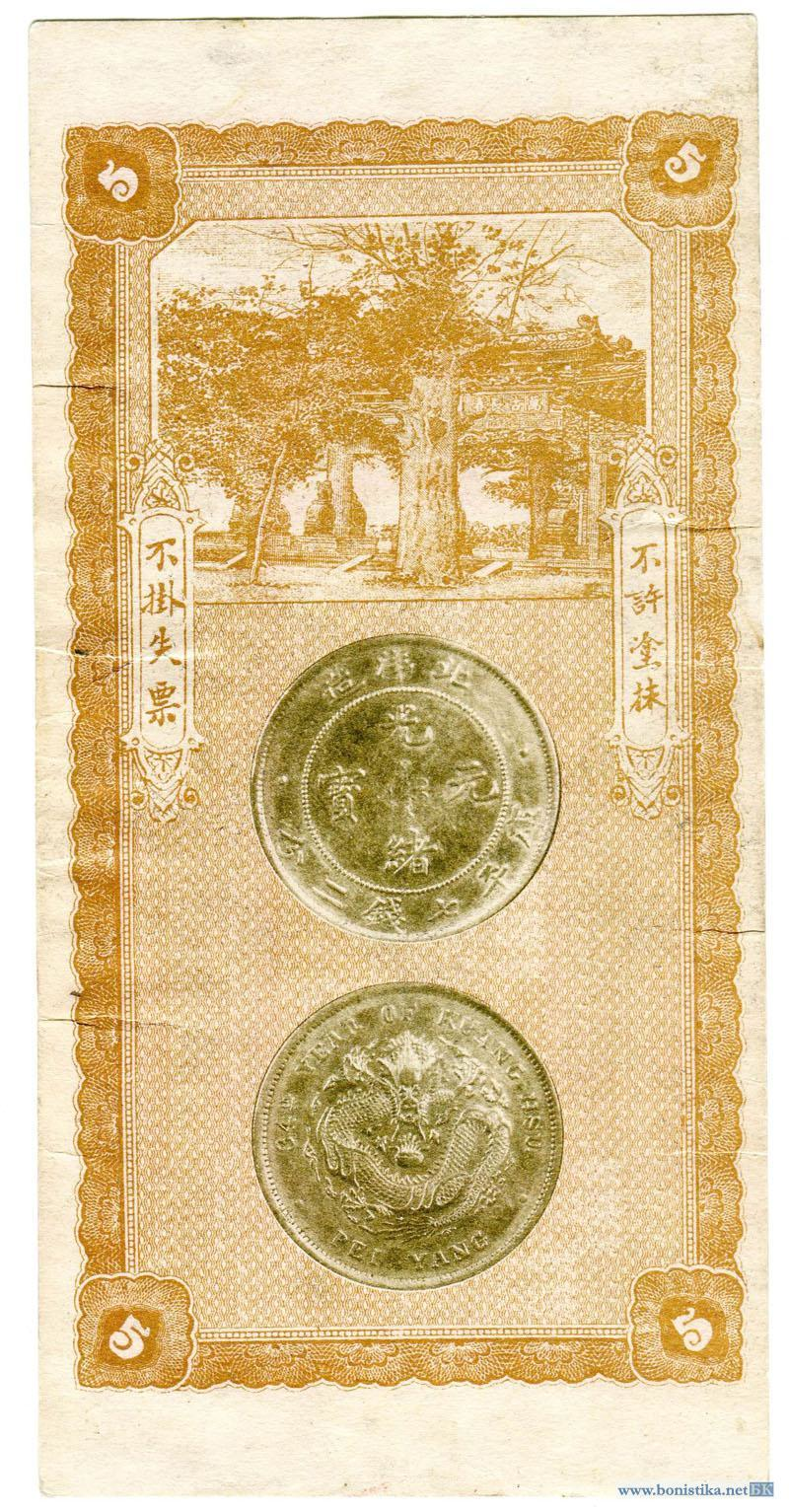
A 1906 zhuangpiao of 5 yuan issued by the De Sheng Yuan Money Shop displaying images of the obverse and reverse sides of a Guangxu Yuanbao (光緒元寶) silver coin, traditionally many zhuangpiao and other historical Chinese banknotes displayed the promised value of the note on it.

As the imperial government of the Qing dynasty was severely strained fiscally, they had to face the same dilemma as they had faced during the 1850s. This dilemma was how to retain their revenue without causing severe inflation which would provoke large scale resistance from the people, and without surrendering more central powers to banking and financial institutions. The government of the Qing dynasty during the 1890s and 1900s was often blighted by both indecision and contradictory policies that would obviate any lasting synergy between the imperial government and private financial and monetary spheres. By the 1850s, or possibly even earlier, this deficiency in centralised monetary policy had allowed privately funded British trading houses and Anglo-Indian financial institutions to take advantage of the situation and meant that they could thrive in the trading cities and ports in coastal China.

In the summer of 1896, under request of Zhang Zhidong, the provincial government of Hubei created the Hupeh Provincial Bank (湖北官錢局, Hubei Guan-Qianju) in the city of Wuchang. The Hubei Guan-Qianju provincial bank established another branch office in the city of Hankou in January of the year 1897. Despite being established during the 1890s by a Chinese provincial government, it was not a modern-style bank but a province-owned qianzhuang. Both the Wuchang and Hankou branches of the Hubei Guan-Qianju issued a series of banknotes known as the Hubei Guanpiao (湖北官票) which was denominated in both silver taels and strings of copper-alloy cash coins. While the local government started restricting the public issuing of zhuangpiao banknotes by qianzhuang, this new series of banknotes, which was under the aegis of Zhang's coin factory and provincial tax revenues, would circulate locally and had enjoyed a good reputation in its early years of their issuance, this fact ought to be accredited in part to Zhang and his policies. This changed however in the year 1926 when the issue of Hubei Guanpiao banknotes became erratic. Both the Wuchang and Hankou branches of the Hubei Guan-Qianju rushed into bankruptcy in 1927, this led to the establishment of another bank, the Hubei Bank.

Zhang Zhidong may have opened a new chapter of the monetary history of China, but scholarly debates still question whether or not his actions were helpful in reviving China's aged monetary system. Yun Liu argues that Zhang's acts may have in fact contributed in making the system even more chaotic than it initially was, by introducing a provincial bank (or provincial qianzhuang in this case) he set precedent for other provinces to follow suit causing the central government of the Qing dynasty to lose even more control over the Chinese monetary system. Zhang's actions were also detrimental to the success of the Hankou qianzhuang, in the year 1899 after reading a report that there were 103 qianzhuang in the city of Hankou, Zhang instructed his subordinates to reduce this number to "the ideal number" of 100 and that this number would have to be maintained forever. Zhang Zhidong also stated that the yearly flood relief donation collection from qianzhuang, which was 400 to 600 taels of silver for renewing members, and 1000 for newcomers, should continue. During this era there was rampant amounts of frauds and forgeries being reported, to address this Zhang simply ordered that the trade census be thorough and that more responsibilities should be assumed via a form of mutual governance by the trade conducted by the qianzhuang itself. However, his order did not perform well and didn't solve any of the reported issues.

While the collapse of the Qing dynasty meant the end of the Shanxi banks in 1911, Shanghai's qianzhuang continued to operate right up to the 1940s when the Japanese occupation disrupted their operations.

=== Republic of China ===
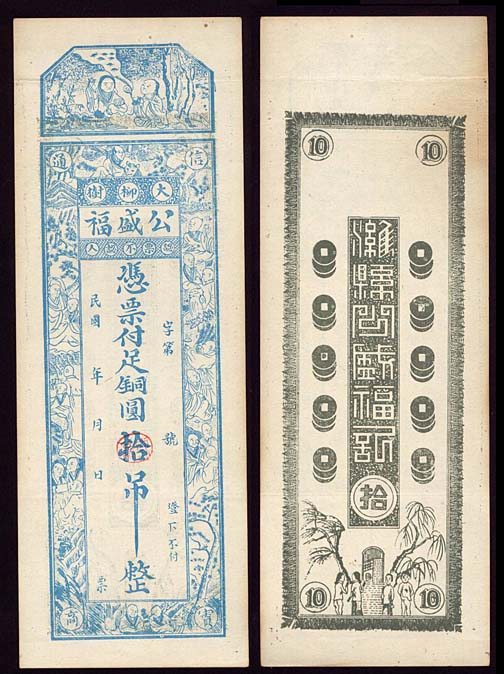
A zhuangpiao of 10 tiao issued by the Gong Xian Fu during the Republic of China era.

The Wuchang Uprising of 1911 occurred right next to Hankou, but despite China transitioning from a monarchy into a republic, the newly formed Chinese republic inherited its passé dynasty with fairly limited changes. Very little improvements came to the monetary market of Hankou and the qianzhuang would remain to be de facto unregulated businesses. The status quo would remain largely the same during the early Republican years, but the system based on social ties started experiencing more dynamic changes.

By February of the year 1912 only 24 qianzhuang remained in business in Shanghai.

In Hankou the qianzhuang were divided into four cliques which were based on their owner's native place or county of origins, these social ties in Chinese culture were linked together in a vague concept known as "Tongxiang" (which could be translated as "hometown-folk"). This division was seen as a source of both market stability and cohesiveness, in the city of Hankou they were known as "Bang" and had a suffix attached referring to their place of origin.

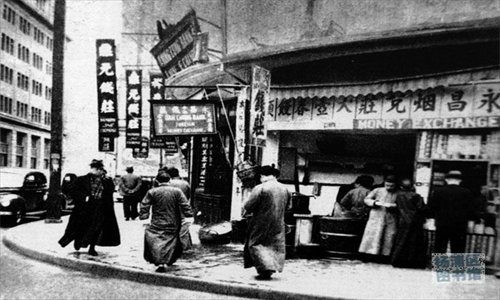
A small local qianzhuang in the treaty port of Shanghai.

During the Kuomintang (KMT) takeover of the Chinese government during the years 1926 and 1927, the Chinese money market crashed again, this crash severely affected the Hankou qianzhuang, by the year 1927 only 5 qianzhuang remained in business in all of Hankou. However, within a single year the Hankou qianzhuang would experience a swift recovery, during this short time frame the number of qianzhuang operating in Hankou would return to 140.

On November 3, 1935, the Chinese Nationalist government had issued the Currency Decree. In the city of Hankou modern banks had been rising steadily, but the relationship between these new players and the Hankou qianzhuang was amicable. The Hankou qianzhuang guild encouraged collaboration between the modern banks and the qianzhuang and would not reject modern banks from its clearing-house in its process of exchange. This did not even change after the modern banks of Hankou had created their own clearing-house later.

By the year 1945 only 88 qianzhuang were officially recorded in Hankou; by this time the old clique system had been replaced by a new system to categorise the qianzhuang based on their ownership, a diverse number of identities were used:

Social groups of the owners with a percentage of the total capital of all registered Hankou qianzhuang
Social group	Percentage
Merchants	40.18%
Native bankers	30.07%
Industrialists	8.07%
Senior managers	6.15%
Modern bankers	5.96%
Jewellery dealers	4.91%
Compradors	1.82%
Government officers	1.45%
Pawn shop owners	1.05%

During this survey a total number of 679 owners registered. It appeared as if the division of Hankou qianzhuang which was based on the hometown of the owners was replaced by a system where the cliques were based on which qianzhuang had existed before World War II and which qianzhuang was established afterwards. The clique of pre-war qianzhuang in Hankou had 31 affiliated members, while the clique of post-war qianzhuang counted 57 members, but the latter would only include 27 members following a series of mergers. In the year 1946 the number of Hankou qianzhuang would rise to 110, and a year later, in 1947, this number had risen to as much as 180.

In 1947 the Shanghai qianzhuang guild invited the guilds from 8 major Chinese cities to form a national qianzhuang guild. In that year, the Nanjing government had commenced closing down illegal qianzhuang in metropolitan areas all over China. This action had a negative impact on many qianzhuang and several Hankou qianzhuang started to attempt to lobby Nanjing to cease the new regulations, throughout China the new regulations were met with great resistance. During the beginning of the year 1948 a new local regulatory body was set up to enforce the new regulations and codes set by Nanjing. But despite these measures the Nanjing government did not have the resources to enforce many of these measures as its position was gradually weakening in light of Communist advances during the Chinese Civil War. In the entire city of Hankou only 60 qianzhuang were fortunate to receive government licenses, this process meant that 48 Hankou qianzhuang were officially ruled to close.

=== People's Republic of China ===
When the People's Liberation Army entered Hankou in early 1949 a total of 36 qianzhuang had remained in the city. Following the Communist takeover of Wuhan, the city's financial order was swiftly restored. The measures taken by the Communists included the enforcement of official registry codes, setting a higher mandatory reserve and registry-capital, creating a standardised set of codes for both bookkeeping and issuing commercial loans, making market speculation illegal, unifying two draft exchanges of commercial banks and the Hankou qianzhuang, and heavily penalising those in the business of making forgeries.

During this period the archives stated that 21 qianzhuang in Hankou applied to be officially registered and 18 qianzhuang were approved with 3 of them being rejected, these 3 qianzhuang would later apply for a business clearance which were all approved at the cost of being subject to meticulous monitoring by the Communist authorities.

The Communists started introducing many Soviet-style reforms, but while many of the reforms affecting the ancien régime banks, including the qianzhuang, superficially resembled the reforms of the Soviet Union, the Chinese Communists would adopt a strategy which they dubbed "cultural positioning". This model would utilise traditional Chinese cultural influences in the process of implementing radical Socialist changes. During this transitional period the qianzhuang of China would maintain their strong traditional identity, but as qianzhuang were severely influenced by the political changes that affected them, many qianzhuang adopted a strategy of political compliance for their continued existence. The Communist Party saw the qianzhuang in a very antagonistic light, this was for a myriad of reasons strongly related to their Confucian nature. The leaders of the Chinese Communist Party viewed the qianzhuang as being a part of the hated bourgeoisie and claimed that qianzhuang were anti-progressive, nationalistic, reactionary against the Socialist revolution, and that they were very politically unreliable. The Communist Party hoped to transform the qianzhuang to serve the proletariat instead of the bourgeoisie. In reality, the political ambiguity of the qianzhuang were likely an obstacle in the eyes of those who wished to transform the mainland Chinese economy into a state-controlled planned economy. But during the initial phase of the People's Republic of China the continued existence of the independent qianzhuang was tolerated.

During the year 1950 the Hankou qianzhuang steadily experienced a recovery, the recovery of the qianzhuang was crucial for the economy of Hankou following the devastating hyperinflation that affected mainland China during the aftermath of World War II and the retreat of the Nationalist Chinese government to Taiwan. The financial authority of Wuhan introduced more regulations and policies affecting the local qianzhuang. The new Wuhan financial authority placed all banks, including qianzhuang, piaohao (Shanxi banks), and commercial banks, into a single category. The local government of Wuhan attempted to negotiate mandatory deposit reserve ratios for banks, valorise credit markets, and release tighter remittance restrictions on all banks to stimulate the ravaged economy.

By the end of the year 1950 the Wuhan financial authority would place all qianzhuang and the sole remaining piaohao of Wuhan, most of which were located in former Hankou, into 3 bank unions, the banks were allowed to negotiate which union they would join. 7 qianzhuang would form the first banking union, 5 Zhe-Bang qianzhuang and 1 piaohao formed the second banking union, and 5 qianzhuang formed the third banking union.

In August of the year 1951 all of these banking unions were merged into a new bank named the United Commerce Bank of Wuhan (or Wuhan United Commerce Bank). Not all banks joined as one Zhe-Bang qianzhuang, which was originally a member of the second banking union, had declined merging into it. As this Zhe-Bang qianzhuang had a sufficient number of its own capital to stay afloat it decided to successfully transform itself into a metal-nail factory in the area of former Hankou. But by 1952 this factory would face debts that were skyrocketing and closed its doors. The United Commerce Bank of Wuhan would convert itself into an agricultural product transportation and trade business in September of the year 1952, from an ostensibly abysmal status with skyrocketing debts announced.

qianzhuang disappeared almost inconspicuously in the year 1952. The Hankou archival evidences from the local sources indicate that their official dissolution been the result of political changes rather than from their inability to serve modern businesses or any form of resistance against ruling orders.

During the 1990s the term qianzhuang would experience a revival in mainland China, in this context qianzhuang refer to informal finance companies which operate within the boundaries of illegality and legality. Like the earlier qianzhuang, the ones that emerged during the late 20th and early 21st centuries tended to be privately owned businesses, they have structures of partnership or sole-proprietorship, with assumingly unlimited liability, they also tend to be operated solely by privately financed credit, they egregiously rely on their owners' social circles, are barely protected by the Chinese state or any of its laws, and are often accused of being loan-sharks or fronts for money-laundering operations. The re-emergence of qianzhuang can help explain why the Chinese tend to offer resistance to the deregulation of its monetary system. Despite the authorities of the People's Republic of China distrusting the qianzhuang, their existence has become too ubiquitous to be trivialised. Yun Liu states that in spite of all the large changes which affected the economy of the People's Republic of China since the 1950s, there is a déjà vu in how both the policymakers of the People's Republic of China and its business sector treat the qianzhuang.

An example of how the modern day situation seems to mirror the 1950s is the fact that the local government of Wuhan merged dozens of smaller local credit companies, that experienced a wild growth during the 1990s, into a new bank named the Wuhan Urban Commercial Bank, 11 years after its creation the Wuhan Urban Commercial Bank was renamed to the "Hankou Bank" in June of the year 2008. This regional bank is incorporated with both public shares and with state-owned assets. Yun Liu thinks that this rebranding might have been done to reflect a gesture of salutation to the Hankou qianzhuang in the local collective memories echoing Hankou as the city of commerce.

== Scrip issued by qianzhuang ==
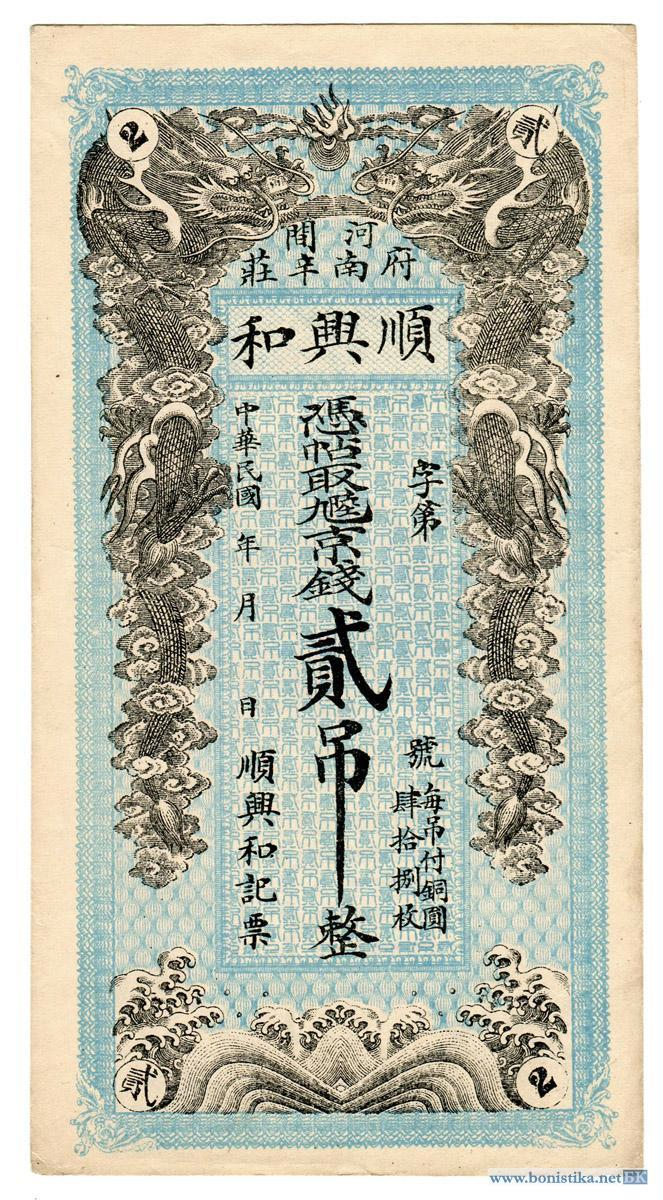
An undated zhuangpiao of 2 tiao (in Jingqian) issued by the Shun Xing He private bank during the early Republic of China.

Many qianzhuang issued their own scrip known as zhuangpiao (莊票) and yinqianpiao (銀錢票, "silver money notes"). When the Great Qing Treasure Note cash notes were suffering from inflation, privately produced zhuangpiao cash notes were valued at double the nominal value of these government-issued cash notes, a number which increased to three and a half times as much before they were finally abolished in 1859. Since Chinese banknotes had a lot of different currency units and almost every small region had their own regional currency, zhuangpiao were issued in many different currency units, and were traded based on the market rates and their relation to each other.

During the late 19th century zhuangpiao banknotes were a common method of payment in the credit business of Shanghai and were both accepted by local and foreign banks. British banks operating in China would often accept zhuangpiao as a security for the loans they gave out to qianzhuang. Foreign banking companies tended to have an account at least one qianzhuang, since only the guilds operated by them could clear the large number zhuangpiao forms that were circulating in the city of Shanghai. The huihuazhuang credit banks of Shanghai enjoyed special privileges over the smaller banks such as the right to issue and to accept yinpiao ("silver notes") denominated in silver taels and qianpiao ("cash notes") denominated in copper-alloy cash coins.. In the year 1933 the government abolished the ancient silver-based currency unit, the tael, and completely replaced it with the yuan; it cleared all banknotes denominated in the ancient tael currency, making all bills which used this currency unit obsolete.

== Classes of qianzhuang ==
The largest qianzhuang were first-class qianzhuang and tended to be mainly centered in large first-tier cities and major trading ports, first-class qianzhuang include the Shanghai qianzhuang, these qianzhuang tended to borrow money from larger financial institutions such as piaohao ("Shanxi banks") or from foreign banks. The general trend forms the pattern that the large financial institutions become financial wholesalers and qianzhuang becomes a retailer. Shanghai's qianzhuang place three positions of the "Eight Butlers" to do the job of creating relationships with other qianzhuang, piaohao, and modernised commercial banks, these staff members were the financial marketers, exchange managers, and interbank managers.

Second-class qianzhuang tended to be located in smaller cities and towns and had the habit of borrowing both cash and zhuangpiao from first-class qianzhuang such as those in Shanghai. Examples of second-class qianzhuang would be in second-tier places such as Jiujiang, Jiangxi, Wuhu, Anhui, and Zhenjiang, Jiangsu. The managers and street runners of smaller qianzhuang have an important task is to establish long-term human relations with big qianzhuang, piaohao, and modernised commercial banks, as well as to acknowledge the tightness degree of money and interest rate fluctuations which occur in the Chinese financial market, and they have to be ready to borrow more cash when the business of the qianzhuang is developing and when the reserves kept by the bank is insufficient to meet their business demands.

Third-class qianzhuang (or "Township qianzhuang") tend to borrow money from the second-class qianzhuang and they were found in places like Liyang, Jiangsu.

== Contemporary reporting on and record keeping of the qianzhuang ==
Various print magazines reported on the during their history such as the "Qianye Yuebao" (Money Business Monthly) issued by the Shanghai Qianzhuang Guild between February 1921 to May 1949, (Note: The issuance of the "Qianye Yuebao" was briefly halted due to the Japanese occupation of Shanghai.) which printed voluminous trade notes, and publicised the trade voice as an insider source. Another contemporary source on the activity was the "Yinhang Zhoubao" (Banking Weekly), which was issued from May 1917 to March 1950 by the Shanghai's Banker Association, a company established in the year 1918. The Bank of China during this period hosted another periodical which was named "Zhonghang Yuekan" (Bank of China Monthly) which was issued during the years 1920–1938. The archived documents of the "Zhonghang Yuekan" are compiled in cities like Shanghai, Wuhan and a few others and include government reports, news press, gazetteers, memoirs, and surveys.

Other contemporary reports on the qianzhuang include the "Shanghai Qianzhuang Shiliao" (Historical Records on the Shanghai Native Banks), "Wuhan Qianzhuang Shiliao" (Historical Records on the Wuhan Native Banks), the "Wuhan Jinrong Zhi" (Wuhan Financial Gazetteers), and the "Hubei Shengzhi Jinrong" (Hubei Provincial Gazetteers Finance Section).

== Differences between qianzhuang and piaohao ==
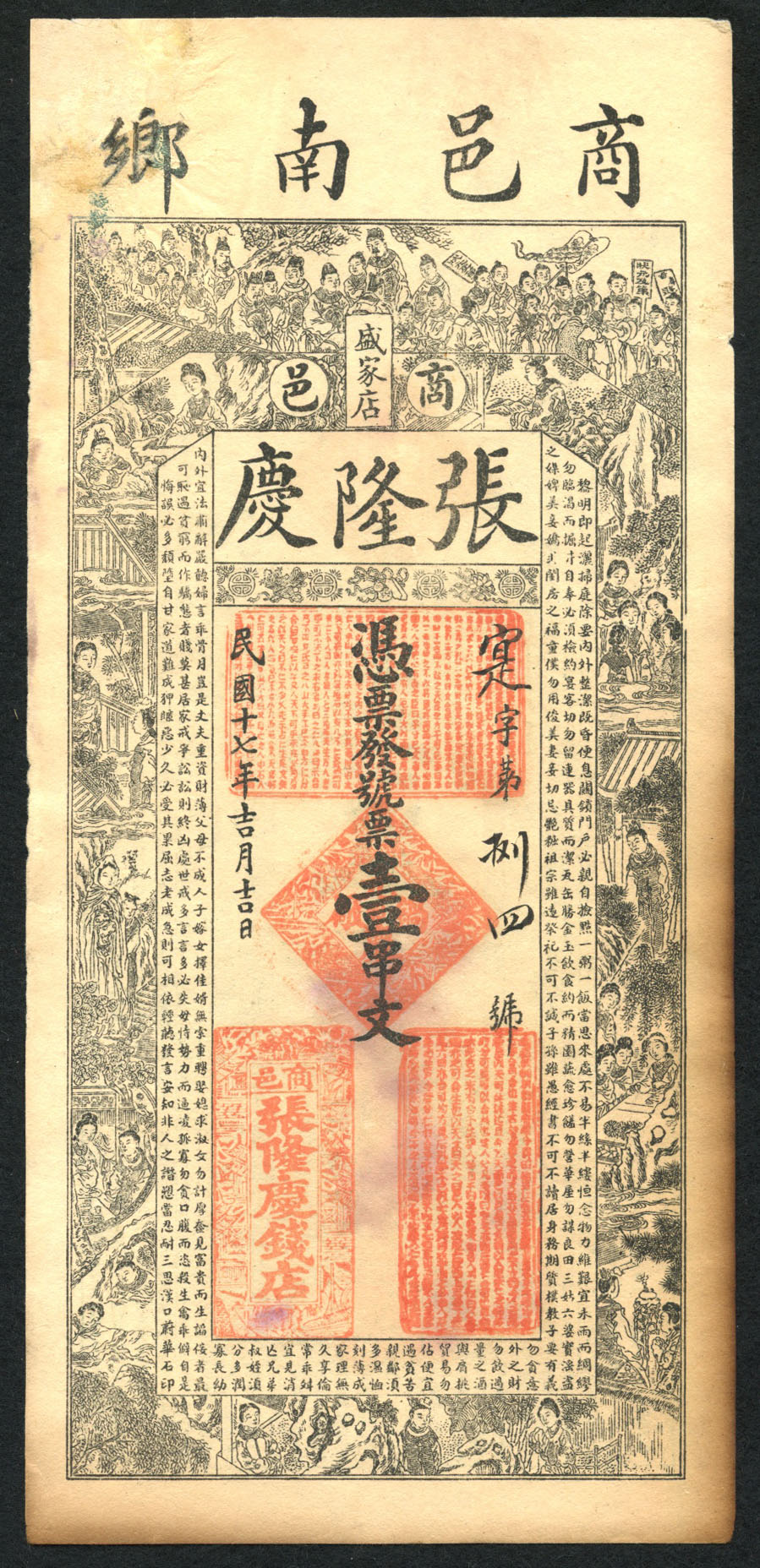
A zhuangpiao banknote of 1 chuàn wén issued by the Zhang Qing Long qianzhuang in the year 1928. It was not uncommon for qianzhuang and piaohao to accept each other's banknotes and in some areas qianzhuang and piaohao used the same clearing-houses.

=== Hankou ===
In an attempt to see why the qianzhuang succeeded in Hankou while the piaohao (or "Shanxi banks") failed Yun Liu attempted to compare them and tried to see why one type of bank slowly disappeared while the other would continue to thrive in the same city, by comparing information available on both of them from the archives of Hankou.

Both the qianzhuang and the piaohao expanded their businesses at the same time. During their history, neither the Hankou qianzhuang nor the Hankou piaohao chose to Westernise their business models and practices, and despite being managed very similarly to each other, the Hankou piaohao would struggle following the fall of the Qing dynasty, while the Hankou qianzhuang would continue to strive.

When modern banks started entering the Hankou scene both the Hankou qianzhuang and the Hankou piaohao would maintain their small business and staff sizes. According to Yun Liu some modern scholars claim that the reason that the piaohao disappeared is because they resisted adopting modern corporate structures and that they remained deliberately ignorant of how modern financial businesses operated. This narrative was stated by the manager of a Hankou piaohao who, in a report to his piaohao's head office in Pingyao, Shanxi, where he insisted on the incorporation of a new bank to be better equipped to compete. His plans included an elaborate scheme of staff duties, how the ownership should work, and its corporate bylaws. But this proposal was disregarded by the higher ups.

Both the Hankou qianzhuang and the Hankou piaohao would continue to claim infinite liability, without actualising an incorporated form, in reality this caused their business traditions to hold a resisting effect to any adoption of fiscal reforms. Yun Liu also argues that it would be futile to argue that either the qianzhuang or the piaohao system would be more Confucian-featured, thus would either be more privileged or deprived in business because of this style assumingly. Following the Wuchang Uprising which occurred in the city of Wuchang, right next to Hankou, the number of Hankou piaohao decreased in a very short amount of time, during the Qing dynasty in the year 1881 the city of Hankou counted a total of 33 piaohao, while only 31 years later immediately following the proclamation of the Republic of China in 1912 the number of piaohao only counted 5. However, in the year 1923 the number of Hankou piaohao would increase to 9. In 1931 the number of Hankou qianzhuang was at 150 compared to only 7 Hankou piaohao. Only two years later, in 1933, the number of active Hankou piaohao had been reduced to 2, by 1949 when the People's Republic of China under the Chinese Communist Party was established only a single piaohao remained in all of Hankou. In his paper, Yun Liu concluded that the reason why Hankou piaohao were more prone to (permanent) closure was because they were more vulnerable to any changes in the political landscape due to their higher levels of exposure to political risks. While for politicians the qianzhuang would often serve as their liaisons to the "locals", this might explain the failure of the Hankou piaohao being plausibly caused by its credit risk hidden in its uncollateralized loans, or a combination of various accidents over the years.

== Modern influence ==
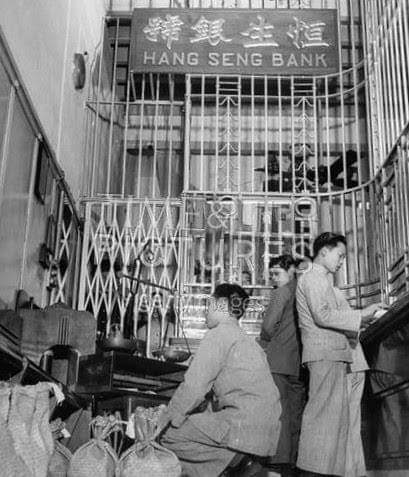
The Hang Seng Bank (恒生銀號) was founded in British Hong Kong in 1933 as a yinhao and later evolved into a commercial bank.

In January 2018 VoxChina issued an article comparing the data on qianzhuang and diandan in 137 counties in northern China, mostly in the Shandong province, in 1912 with the modern development of informal financial entities in the same region, particularly small loan companies (xiao'e daikuan gongsi), rotating savings and credit associations (ROSCAs or hehui), pawnshops, and (illegal) underground banks (dixia qianzhuang) over the past couple of decades before the study and how these informal financial institutions both emerged and rapidly expanded. The analysis found a positive correlation between the density of historical financial institutions and the density of modern informal small loan companies.

In counties where there was a large native financial sector denominated by qianzhuang and diandan before the year 1911, the density of small loan companies tended to be higher in 2018. In terms of magnitude, VoxChina found a 1% increase in the number of historical financial institutions (per 10,000 people) in the late Qing dynasty era increases 0.096% of the number (and 0.158% of total assets) of small loan companies (per 10,000 people) in the same areas in 2013. These results are potent to controlling for a range of confounding factors including economic growth, the structure of the local industry, state-owned banking companies, and the geography of these small financial institutions, among others. The researchers of VoxChina suspected that these correlations might be related to the tenants of Confucianism which harnessed a culture where these informal financial institutions only provide services to respected and credible people. VoxChina compared the density of informal and small financial institutions with the density of Confucian temples and found a positive correlation strengthening their hypothesis that their presence is related to Confucian culture in absence of strong modern legal protections which may cause modern banking and financial institutions to rely more on traditional methods of conduct.

Similar effects of historical financial institutions and religious cultures have also been found in Islamic countries and Italy. As their work coincides with both Pauline Grosjean, who in her 2011 paper The Institutional Legacy of the Ottoman Empire: Islamic Rule and Financial Development in South Eastern Europe published in the Journal of Comparative Economics found that the historical Islamic rule that prohibited interest-lending resulted in a less developed financial and banking market today, and Luigi Pascali, who in his 2016 paper Banks and Development: Jewish Communities in the Italian Renaissance and Current Economic Performance in the Review of Economics and Statistics found that the charity-lending institutions in 15th century Italy still had an effect on the performance of the modern Italian banking sector.

== Sources ==
- Cheng Linsun (2003). Banking in modern China: entrepreneurs, professional managers and the development of Chinese banks. New York: Cambridge University Press. pp. 1897–1937.
- Hamashita Takeshi (濱下武志) (1980). Chūgokutsūshōginkō no setsuritsu to Honkon Shanhaiginkō 中国通商銀行の設立と香港上海銀行. Hitotsubashironsō.
- Huang Da (黃達), Liu Hongru (劉鴻儒), Zhang Xiao (張肖), ed. (1990). Zhongguo jinrong baike quanshu (中國金融百科全書) (Beijing: Jingji guanli chubanshe), Vol. 1, 228. (in Mandarin Chinese).
- Huang Jianhui (黃鑒暉) (1994). Zhongguo yinhangyeshi 中國銀行業史 (in Chinese). Taiyuan: Shanxi jingji chubanshe.
- Ji Zhaojin (2002). A history of modern Shanghai banking. Armonk: M.E. Sharpe.
- Kang Guohong (康國宏) (1997). "Qianzhuang (錢莊)", in Men Kui (門巋), Zhang Yanjin (張燕瑾) (ed.), Zhonghua guocui da cidian (中華國粹大辭典) (Hong Kong: Guoji wenhua chuban gongsi), 102. (in Mandarin Chinese).
- Kwan Man Bun (2001). The salt merchants of Tianjin: state-making and civil society in late Imperial China. Honolulu, Hawai: University of Hawaii Press.
- McElderry, A.L. (1976). Shanghai old-style banks (Ch'ien- Chuang), 1800–1925: a traditional institution in a changing society. Ann Arbor, Michigan: Center for Chinese Studies, University of Michigan.
- McLean, D. (1976). "Finance and 'informal empire' before the first world war". Economic History Review. 29 (2): 291–305. doi:10.2307/2594316. JSTOR 2594316.
- Pan Liangui (潘連貴) (2004). Shanghai huobishi 上海貨幣史 (in Chinese). Shanghai: Shanghai renminchubanshe.
- Peng Xinwei (彭信威) (1954 [2007]). Zhongguo huobi shi (中國貨幣史) (Shanghai: Qunlian chubanshe), pp. 580–581, 597–605. (in Mandarin Chinese).
- Peng Xinwei (彭信威) (1994) A monetary history of China (translated by Edward H. Kaplan). Western Washington University (Bellingham, Washington).
- Wagel, S.S. (1915). "Chinese currency and banking". North China Daily News and Herald. Shanghai.
- Wang, Y. F. (2017). The Risk Control of Qianzhuang. International Business and Management, 14 (2), 38–47.
- Wu Chengxi (吴承禧). Zhongguo de Yinhang (中國的銀行). Shanghai: Shangwu yinshuguan, 1934. (in Mandarin Chinese).
- Yang Duanliu (楊端六) (1962). Qingdai huobi jinrong shigao 清代貨幣金融史稿. Beijing: Shenghuo.
- Yao Enquan (姚恩權) (1993). "Qianzhuang (錢莊)", in Shi Quanchang (石泉長), ed. Zhonghua baike yaolan (中華百科要覽) (Shenyang: Liaoning renmin chubanshe), 86. (in Mandarin Chinese).
- Ye Shichang (葉世昌) (2003). Gudai Zhongguo jingji sixiangshi 古代中國經濟思想史. Shanghai: Fudan daxue chubanshe.
- Zhang Guohui (張國輝) (1992). "Qianzhuang (錢莊)", in Zhongguo da baike quanshu (中國大百科全書), Zhongguo lishi (中國歷史) (Beijing / Shanghai: Zhongguo da baike quanshu chubanshe), Vol. 2, 775. (in Mandarin Chinese).
- Zhang Guohui - Wan Qing qian zhuang he piao hao yan jiu (in Mandarin Chinese).
- Zhang Guohui (張國輝) (1988). "Qianzhuang (錢莊)", in Zhongguo da baike quanshu (中國大百科全書), Jingjixue (經濟學), Vol. 2, 729. (in Mandarin Chinese).
- Zhao Yulin (趙玉林), Wang Huazhong (王化中), ed. (1990). Jingjixue cidian (經濟學辭典) (Beijing: Zhongguo jingji chubanshe), 702. (in Mandarin Chinese).
