= Lai Chi Kok =

Coordinates: 22°20′N 114°08′E

Lai Chi Kok 荔枝角
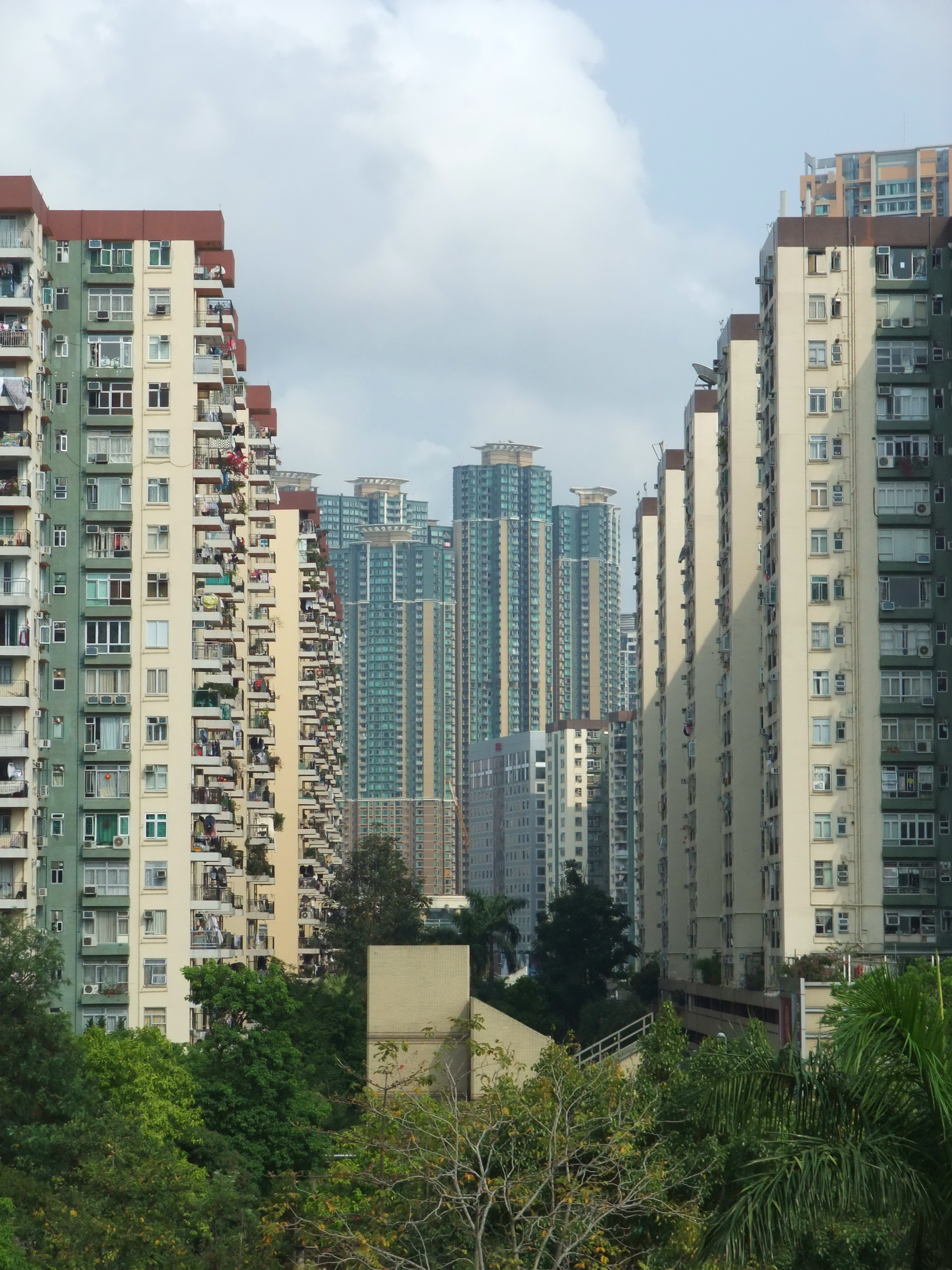
- View from Lai Chi Kok Park. Banyan Garden is at the far end. Mei Foo Sun Chuen phase 5 and 7 is on the left and right respectively.
- Hong Kong Flag
- Interactive map of Lai Chi Kok
- District: Sham Shui Po District
- Time zone: UTC+8

Lai Chi Kok
- Chinese: 荔枝角
Transcriptions
Standard Mandarin
- Hanyu Pinyin: Lìzhī Jiǎo
Yue: Cantonese
- Yale Romanization: Laih jī gok
- Jyutping: Lai6 zi1 gok3

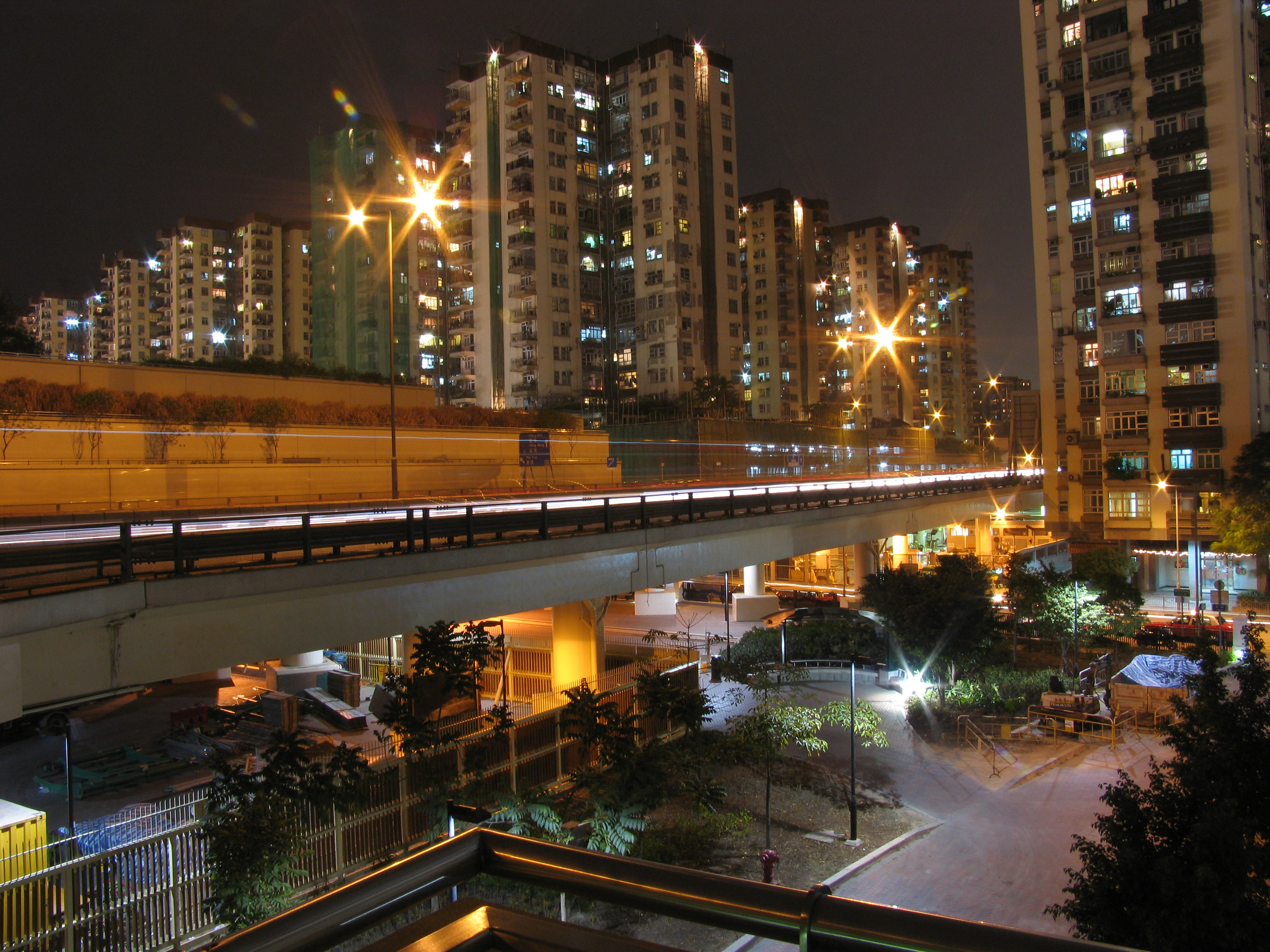
Mei Foo Sun Chuen housing estate in Lai Chi Kok

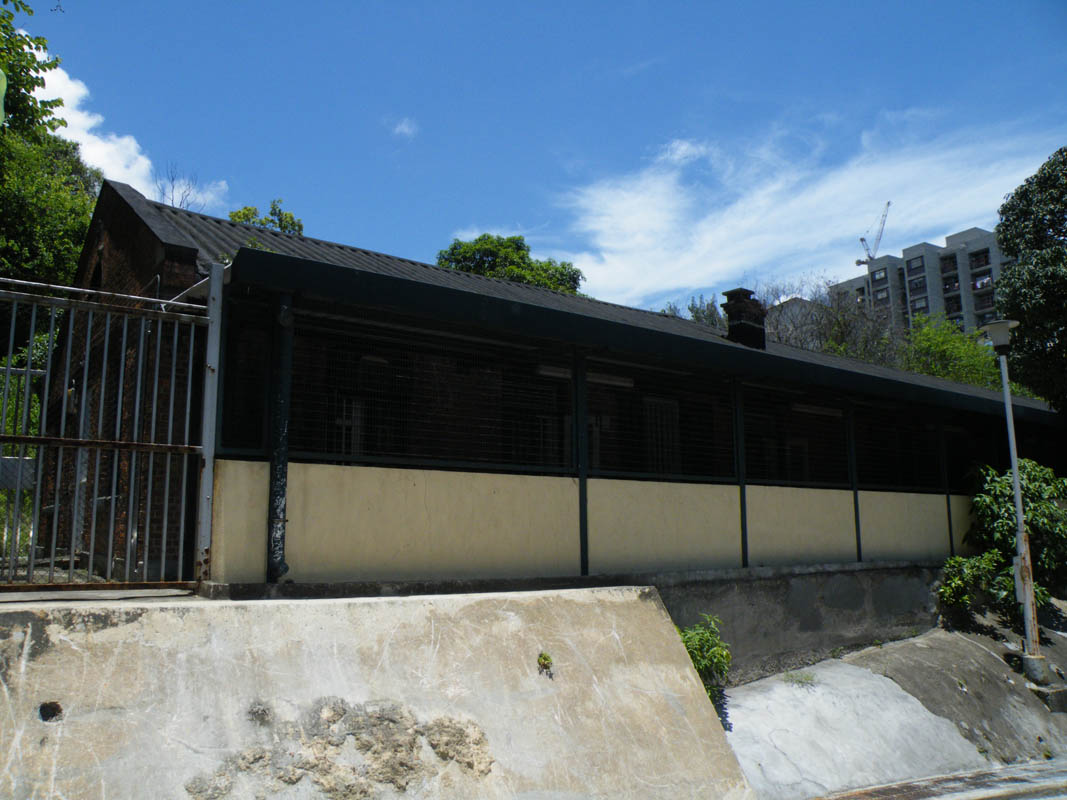
Former Lai Chi Kok Hospital

Lai Chi Kok is a neighbourhood in Kowloon, Hong Kong, east of Kwai Chung and west of Cheung Sha Wan. Mei Foo Sun Chuen is the largest housing estate in the area and also the largest in Hong Kong with 99 blocks. Administratively, it belongs to Sham Shui Po District.

== History ==
Xin an county gazette (新安縣志), published in AD 1819, did not have any description of Lai chi kok, therefore, we did not have detail information of earlier history of the region.

Lai Chi Kok literally means "lychee corner", referring to a seashore named after a type of fruit tree native to southern China. However, some historians such as Leung Ping Wah suggested the original name of the region was Lai Tsai Kuok (孺仔脚), literally mean the footprint of the youngest son. The river once separated Cheung Sha Wan from Lai Chi Kok Bay, and a river from Butterfly Valley separated Cheung Sha Wan from Lai Chi Kok. At the innermost area of Lai Chi Kok Bay, namely present-day Lai King Hill Road, is a settlement called Kau Wa Keng.

The Qing government had set up a customs station in Lai Chi Kok, to collect customs duties after ceding Hong Kong Island and Kowloon Peninsula to the British. After the lease of the New Territories, the British reclaimed Lai Chi Kok for military use. A torpedo storage facility was also erected on the west point of Lai Chi Kok Bay, an area near Kwai Chung.

At the time of the 1911 census, the population of Lai Chi Kok was 173.

== Buildings ==
Lai Chi Kok Hospital is a special hospital located on the original location of the cap. Its neighbour, the Lai Chi Kok Reception Centre, is managed by the Hong Kong Correctional Services. At one point, the Lai Chi Kok Incinerator was one of three incinerators in Hong Kong; however, it was demolished because it released pollutants into the Hong Kong air. The headquarters of the Kowloon Motor Bus was also in Lai Chi Kok, before being relocated; the site has since been replaced by a private housing project called Manhattan Hill.

== Transport ==
The area is served by Mei Foo station on the MTR Tsuen Wan line and Tuen Ma line. The MTR's Lai Chi Kok station is actually in Cheung Sha Wan, not Lai Chi Kok. Mei Foo is a transportation hub due to its geographic location in the north-western end of Kowloon. Lai Chi Kok Road is named after this place, but most part of the road lies outside Lai Chi Kok.

== Education ==
Lai Chi Kok is in Primary One Admission (POA) School Net 40. Within the school net are multiple aided schools (operated independently but funded with government money) and two government schools: Fuk Wing Street Government Primary School and Li Cheng Uk Government Primary School.

Hong Kong Public Libraries maintains the Lai Chi Kok Public Library.

== See also ==
- Lai Chi Kok Amusement Park

== See also ==
- Cheung Sha Wan
- Mei Foo Sun Chuen
