= Lai Chi Kok Amusement Park =

Defunct amusement park in Hong Kong

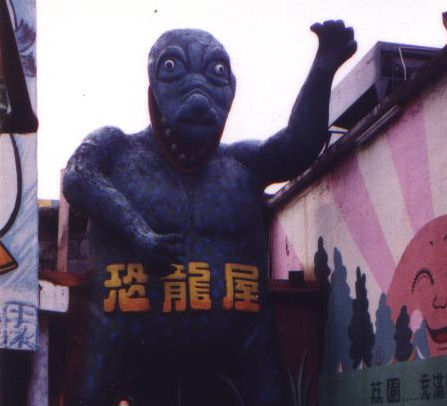
- Dinosaur house entrance
- Interactive map of Lai Chi Kok Amusement Park
- Location: Lai Chi Kok Bay, Lai Chi Kok, Hong Kong
- Coordinates: 22.3425541°N 114.1369253°E
- Status: Defunct
- Opened: 16 April 1949
- Closed: 31 March 1997
- Owner: Cheung Kwan On

Lai Chi Kok Amusement Park
- Traditional Chinese: 荔園遊樂場
Transcriptions
Standard Mandarin
- Hanyu Pinyin: Lìyuán yóulècháng
Yue: Cantonese
- Yale Romanization: lai6 yun2 yau4 lok6 cheung4
- Jyutping: lai6 jyun4 jau4 lok6 coeng4

Alternative Chinese name
- Traditional Chinese: 荔園
Transcriptions
Standard Mandarin
- Hanyu Pinyin: Lìyuán
Yue: Cantonese
- Yale Romanization: lai6 yun2
- Jyutping: lai6 jyun4

Lai Chi Kok Amusement Park was an amusement park on the west shore of Lai Chi Kok Bay in Lai Chi Kok, Hong Kong. It was once the largest amusement park in Hong Kong, and attracted people from all walks of life in the territory.

== History ==
=== Operation ===
The park was originally opened by businessman Cheung Kwan On on 16 April 1949. In 1961, Deacon Chiu purchased the park and started improving it. In 1976, the park started losing business to Ocean Park.

In 1995, the Ferris wheel was temporarily closed because engineers were dissatisfied with its condition.

The admission fee started at 60 HK cents for both adult and child admission, but by 1997 it had risen to HK$12–$25. A monorail, which cost $13, let visitors get a view of the whole park.

== Features ==
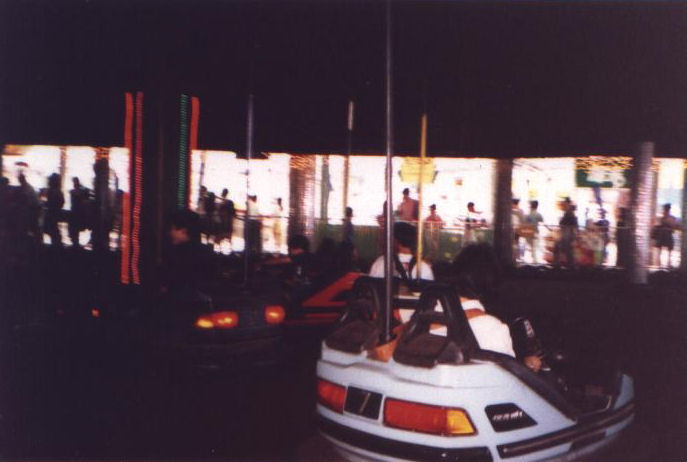
Bumper cars

=== Rides and entertainment ===
The park featured theatres, amusement rides, sidestalls, and various water games. Amusement rides included a Ferris wheel, bumper cars, a carousel, distorted mirrors, a gondola, a coffee cup ride, ghost house, and a ding-dong boat. Knife-throwing performances also attracted visitors. An ice rink was part of the winter display, which also included a Snow garden where snow was created for people who had never seen it in the hot climate of Hong Kong.

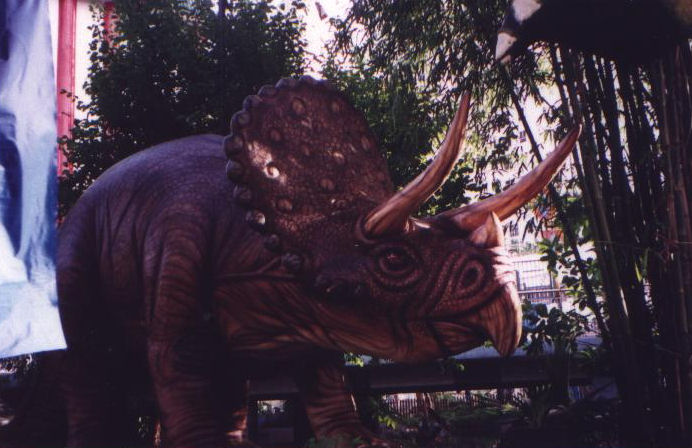
Dinosaur displays

Some of the names of rides and stops include the Song dynasty village, Twin Dragon, Space Car, Sky Merry, Monster, Dragon Coaster, Dark Ride, Astro Swinger, Astro Air Boat, Orient Express, Surprising House, Haunted Mansion and Grandish House. Fortune telling was also available at the park. Beneath the restaurant was Hong Kong's largest wax museum at the time, featuring many leading figures from China's history.

=== Performances ===
Cantonese opera and singing performances in the park nurtured TV and cantopop stars like Anita Mui.

=== Lai Chi Kok Zoo ===
Lai Chi Kok Zoo (Chinese: 荔園動物園; Cantonese Yale: lai6 yun4 dung6 mat6 yun4), located on the west shore of Lai Chi Kok Bay, was a small private zoo which operated between 1951 and 1993. It had 21 pens in a crescent shaped grounds with a variety of animals from around the world, including binturong, porcupine, sika deer, goat from Germany, Chinese alligator, lion, black panther, vulture, peacock, cougar (Mountain Lion), Bactrian camel, giraffe, Asian elephant, Saltwater crocodile, and Siberian tiger. In 1996, 12 young crocodiles from Thailand were brought to the park. All of them were offspring of the world's largest crocodile, recorded in the Guinness Book of World Records.

Its star attraction was an Asian elephant Tino (or Tinnu) (天奴). While a baby, Tino was part of a circus and was given to the Zoo in 1958. It was the most popular animal in the 1950s to 1970s and suffered from pneumonia and was put down in February 1989.

After 1976, the zoo suffered from competition with the much larger Ocean Park. On 31 July 1993, the zoo was closed. This decision was hastened by the Hong Kong Government refusing import licences for new animals, it has since been redeveloped for residential purposes. Most of the remaining animals were sent to Xili Lake Wild Animal Park (now called Shenzhen Safari Park) in Shenzhen. Concern has subsequently been expressed about their welfare in view of criticism of the Safari Park's standards of animal care. The Saltwater crocodiles remained at the Park until it closed in 1997 and were then taken to Shek Kwu Chau.

== Closure ==
On 31 March 1997, the park was closed after the Hong Kong Government decided to use the land for residential public housing. Many additional visitors came to the park as it was about to close, and there were 80,000 visitors on the last two days alone. The animals from the zoo were sent to Shenzhen Safari Park in 1993.

In 1997, Regional Services Department curators spent months negotiating with Far East Hotels and Entertainment to buy the amusements from the closed park, with their historical value. Popular rides such as the Ferris wheel and the ding-dong boats were moved to Hai Mun county, Shanghai where the owner Deacon Chiu Te-ken has family ties. The oldest rides, such as the dodgem cars, were sold to Burma or demolished.

=== Renegotiation ===
In 2005, the owner Yau negotiated with the government to build a new amusement park on Lantau Island. However no results have yet been achieved on this matter.

A new version of Lai Chi Kok Amusement Park opened in Central, Hong Kong Island on 26 June 2015. Being free of admission fee, some games are charged with game coins.
