= Mandarin =

Mandarin or The Mandarin may refer to:

== Language ==
- Mandarin Chinese, branch of Chinese originally spoken in northern parts of the country
  - Standard Chinese or Modern Standard Mandarin, the official language of China
    - Taiwanese Mandarin, Standard Mandarin as spoken in Taiwan
    - Singaporean Mandarin, Standard Mandarin as spoken in Singapore
  - Old Mandarin or Early Mandarin was the speech of northern China during the Jurchen-ruled Jin dynasty and the Mongol-led Yuan dynasty (12th to 14th centuries).
  - Mandarin (late imperial lingua franca), the spoken standard of the Ming and Qing dynasties of China

== Biological species ==
- Mandarin orange (Citrus reticulata), a sweet, orange lookalike
- Mandarin duck (Aix galericulata), a perching duck species found in East Asia
- Mandarin dogfish, two species of small shark in the genus Cirrhigaleus off East Asian coast
- Mandarinfish (disambiguation), various fishes
- Mandarin vole (Lasiopodomys mandarinus), a species of vole found in China and the Korean Peninsula
- Spotted mandarin (disambiguation), various species

== Arts, entertainment, and media ==
- The Mandarin (operetta), an operetta by Reginald De Koven and Harry B. Smith
- The Miraculous Mandarin, a one-act pantomime ballet composed by Béla Bartók
- Mandarin (character), a supervillain in the Marvel Comics universe
  - Wenwu, a version of the Mandarin in the Marvel Cinematic Universe
  - Trevor Slattery, a version of the Mandarin in the Marvel Cinematic Universe
  - Aldrich Killian (Marvel Cinematic Universe), a version of the Mandarin in the Marvel Cinematic Universe
- Mandarin (SRMTHFG), a character in the animated TV series Super Robot Monkey Team Hyperforce Go!
- Mandarins Drum and Bugle Corps, a drum and bugle corps from Sacramento, California, United States
- The Mandarin (website), an Australian online magazine
- MTV Mandarin, a 24-hour music channel owned by MTV Networks Asia Pacific

=== Novels ===
- The Mandarin (novel), an 1880 novel by the Portuguese writer José Maria de Eça de Queirós
- The Mandarins, 1954 novel by Simone de Beauvoir
- Mandarin (Elegant novel), a 1983 novel by Robert Elegant
- Mandarin (Havan novel), a 2008 novel by John Havan

== Clothing ==
- Mandarin gown or cheongsam, a Chinese style of dress
- Mandarin collar, a short shirt or jacket collar that is not folded from Qing era China
- Mandarin square, a badge worn by officials in Imperial China

== Companies ==
- Mandarin Airlines, a subsidiary of China Airlines
- The Mandarin, former name of Mandarin Oriental, Hong Kong, a Hong Kong hotel
- Mandarin Films, a film production company of Hong Kong
- Mandarin Restaurant, an all-you-can-eat Chinese-Canadian buffet chain in Ontario, Canada
- Mandarin Software, a British software developer / publisher

== Other uses ==
- Mandarin (bureaucrat), a bureaucrat of Imperial China (the original meaning of the word)
  - by extension, any senior government bureaucrat
- Mandarin cuisine, another name for Beijing cuisine
- Mandarin (Jacksonville), a 19th-century community, since absorbed into the city limits of Jacksonville, United States
  - Mandarin High School, a high school in the southern part of Jacksonville, Florida, United States
- Mandarin porcelain, a wide range of porcelain that was made and decorated in China exclusively for export to Europe and later to North America
- Mandarin paradox, an ethical parable

== See also ==
- Mandarina, a genus of land snail
- Korean mandarin (disambiguation)
- Mandrin (disambiguation)
- Mantri, an Indian title for ministers, the etymon for Mandarin
