= Elegance (disambiguation) =

Elegance is beauty that shows unusual effectiveness and simplicity.

Elegance may also refer to:

- Elegance coral, a large polyp stony coral from the western Pacific Ocean
- Elegance Garden, a Private Sector Participation Scheme estate in Tai Po, Hong Kong, China
- Elegance (mathematics), the notion that some mathematicians may derive aesthetic pleasure from their work, and from mathematics in general
- Elegance (typeface), a letterpress typeface by Karlgeorg Hoefer for Ludwig & Mayer

== See also ==
- Robert Elegant (born 1928), British-American author and journalist
- Petronius (c. 27 - 66), Roman courtier, nicknamed elegantiae arbiter or arbiter elegantiarum, "judge of elegance"
