= Fu Heng Estate =

Public housing estate in Tai Po, Hong Kong

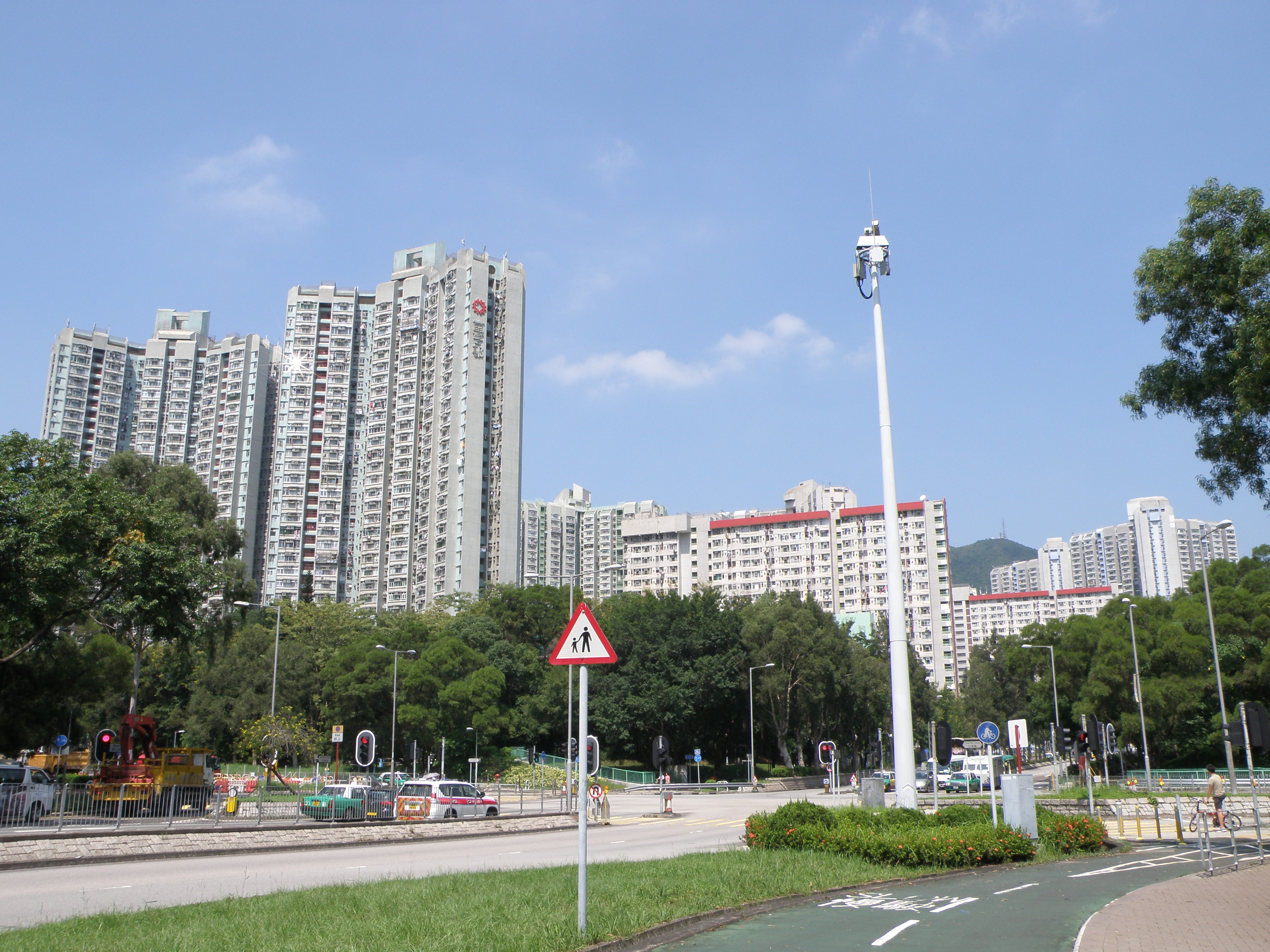
- Fu Heng Estate
- Interactive map of Fu Heng Estate

General information
- Location: 6 Chung Nga Road, Tai Po; New Territories, Hong Kong
- Coordinates: 22.44863°N 114.17455°E
- Status: Completed
- Category: Public rental housing
- Population: 17,452 (2016)
- No. of blocks: 8
- No. of units: 2,229

Construction
- Constructed: 1990; 36 years ago
- Authority: Hong Kong Housing Authority

Fu Heng Estate (Chinese: 富亨邨) is a mixed TPS and public housing estate in Tai Po, New Territories, Hong Kong. It consists of eight residential blocks built in 1990. Some of the flats were sold to tenants through Tenants Purchase Scheme Phase 3 in 2000.

Chung Nga Court (頌雅苑) is a Home Ownership Scheme court in Tai Po, near Fu Heng Estate. It consists of three residential buildings built in 1991.

== Houses ==
=== Fu Heng Estate ===
Name	Chinese name	Building type	Completed
Heng Shing House	亨盛樓	New Slab	1990
Heng Yue House	亨裕樓	New Slab	1990
Heng Wing House	亨榮樓	Trident 3	1990
Heng Tsui House	亨翠樓	Trident 3	1990
Heng Yiu House	亨耀樓	Trident 3	1990
Heng Tai House	亨泰樓	Trident 4	1990
Heng Cheong House	亨昌樓	Trident 4	1990
Heng Lung House	亨隆樓	Trident 4	1990

=== Chung Nga Court ===
Name	Chinese name	Building type	Completed
Chung Chun House	頌真閣	Trident 3	1991
Chung Sin House	頌善閣	Trident 4	1991
Chung May House	頌美閣	Trident 4	1991

== Demographics ==
According to the 2016 by-census, Fu Heng Estate had a population of 17,452 while Chung Nga Court had a population of 5,506. Altogether the population amounts to 22,958.

== Politics ==
For the 2019 District Council election, the estate fell within two constituencies. Most of the estate is located in the Fu Heng constituency, which is currently represented by William Ho Wai-lam, while Heng Tai House and Chung Nga Court falls within the Chung Ting constituency, which was formerly represented by Man Nim-chi until July 2021.

== See also ==
- Public housing estates in Tai Po
