= Sun Hing Garden =

Public housing estate in Tai Po, Hong Kong

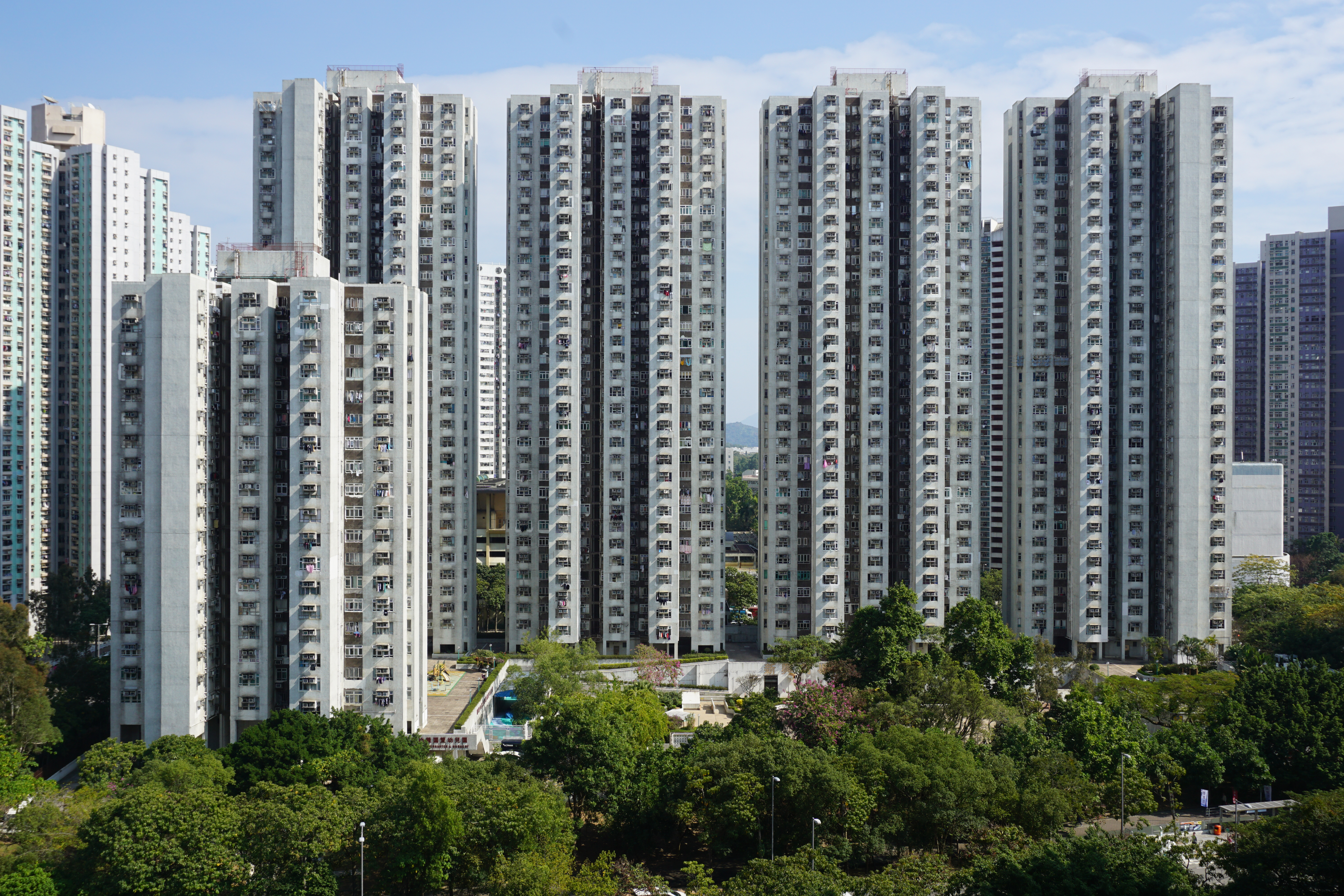
- Sun Hing Garden
- Interactive map of Sun Hing Garden

General information
- Location: 2 On Po Lane, Tai Po; New Territories, Hong Kong
- Coordinates: 22.4536025°N 114.1731659°E
- Status: Completed
- Category: Home Ownership Scheme
- Population: 4,303 (2016)
- No. of blocks: 5
- No. of units: 1,460

Construction
- Constructed: 1986; 40 years ago
- Authority: Hong Kong Housing Authority

Sun Hing Garden (Chinese: 新興花園) is a Home Ownership Scheme and Private Sector Participation Scheme court built on reclaimed land of Tai Po Hoi in Tai Po, New Territories, Hong Kong near Fu Shin Estate, Chung Nga Court, Ming Nga Court, New Territories North Regional Police Headquarters and Fu Shin Sports Centre. It has a total of five residential blocks built in 1986.

== Houses ==
Name	Chinese name	Building type	Completed
Hong Che Court (Block 1)	康智閣 (第1座)	Private Sector Participation Scheme	1986
Hong Yan Court (Block 2)	康仁閣 (第2座)	Private Sector Participation Scheme	1986
Hong Shun Court (Block 3)	康信閣 (第3座)	Private Sector Participation Scheme	1986
Hong Shing Court (Block 4)	康誠閣 (第4座)	Private Sector Participation Scheme	1986
Hong Man Court (Block 5)	康民閣 (第5座)	Private Sector Participation Scheme	1986

== Demographics ==
According to the 2016 by-census, Sun Hing Garden had a population of 4,303. The median age was 42.9 and the majority of residents (96.5 per cent) were of Chinese ethnicity. The average household size was 3 people. The median monthly household income of all households (i.e. including both economically active and inactive households) was HK$36,430.

== Politics ==
Sun Hing Garden is located in Fu Ming Sun constituency of the Tai Po District Council. It was formerly represented by Kwan Wing-yip, who was elected in the 2019 elections until July 2021.

== See also ==
- Public housing estates in Tai Po
