= Fu Shin Estate =

Public housing estate in Tai Po, Hong Kong

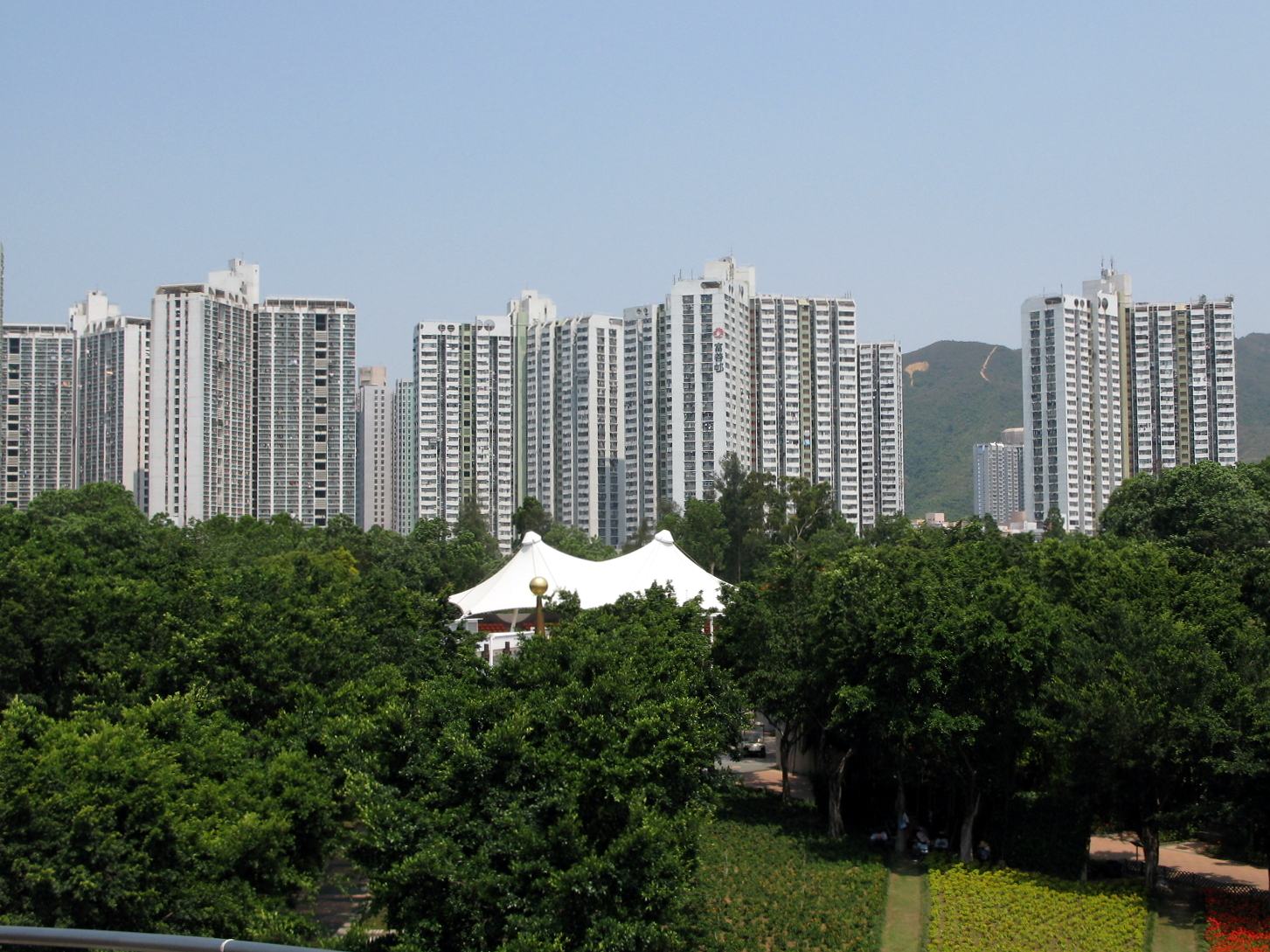
- Fu Shin Estate
- Interactive map of Fu Shin Estate

General information
- Location: 12 On Po Road, Tai Po; New Territories, Hong Kong
- Coordinates: 22.45412°N 114.17441°E
- Status: Completed
- Category: Public rental housing
- Population: 14,583 (2016)
- No. of blocks: 6
- No. of units: 4,600

Construction
- Constructed: 1985; 41 years ago
- Authority: Hong Kong Housing Authority

Fu Shin Estate (Chinese: 富善邨) is a mixed TPS and public housing estate in Tai Po, New Territories, Hong Kong, built on the reclaimed land of Tai Po Hoi. It consists of six residential blocks built in 1985. Some of the flats were sold to tenants through Tenants Purchase Scheme Phase 6B in 2005.

Ming Nga Court (明雅苑) and Yee Nga Court (怡雅苑) are Home Ownership Scheme housing courts in Tai Po near Fu Shin Estate, built in 1985 and 1993 respectively.

== History ==
=== Lift plunge incident ===
On 25 October 2008, a lift at Shin Nga House, Fu Shin Estate suddenly plunged 14 storeys, but no one was injured. This raised concerns on lift safety. The government later confirmed the incident was caused by the failure of the counterweight pulley bearing, which caused the dislodgement of all eight suspension ropes from the counterweight.

== Houses ==
=== Fu Shin Estate ===
Name	Chinese name	Building type	Completed
Shin Kwan House	善群樓	Trident 1	1985
Shin Lun House	善鄰樓	Trident 1	1985
Shin King House	善景樓	Trident 2	1985
Shin Mei House	善美樓	Trident 2	1985
Shin Nga House	善雅樓	Trident 2	1985
Shin Tsui House	善翠樓	Trident 2	1985

=== Ming Nga Court ===
Name	Chinese name	Building type	Completed
Ming Hoi House	明凱閣	Windwill	1985
Ming Yan House	明欣閣	Windwill	1985
Ming Cheong House	明昌閣	Windwill	1985

=== Yee Nga Court ===
Name	Chinese name	Building type	Completed
Yee Lai House	怡禮閣	NCB (Ver.1984)	1993
Yee Shun House	怡順閣	NCB (Ver.1984)	1993
Yee Hau House	怡厚閣	NCB (Ver.1984)	1993
Yee Dat House	怡達閣	NCB (Ver.1984)	1993
Yee Leung House	怡亮閣	NCB (Ver.1984)	1993

== Demographics ==
According to the 2016 by-census, Fu Shin Estate had a population of 14,583, Ming Nga Court had a population of 4,168 while Po Nga Court had a population of 4,841. Altogether the population amounts to 23,592.

== Politics ==
For the 2019 District Council election, the estate fell within two constituencies. Most of the estate and Yee Nga Court are located in the Yee Fu constituency, which was formerly represented by Yam Kai-bong until July 2021, while the remainder of the estate and Ming Nga Court falls within the Fu Ming Sun constituency, which was formerly represented by Kwan Wing-yip until July 2021.

== See also ==
- Public housing estates in Tai Po
- Hong Kong Taoist Association The Yuen Yuen Institute No.2 Secondary School
