= Tai Yuen Estate =

Public housing estate in Tai Po, Hong Kong

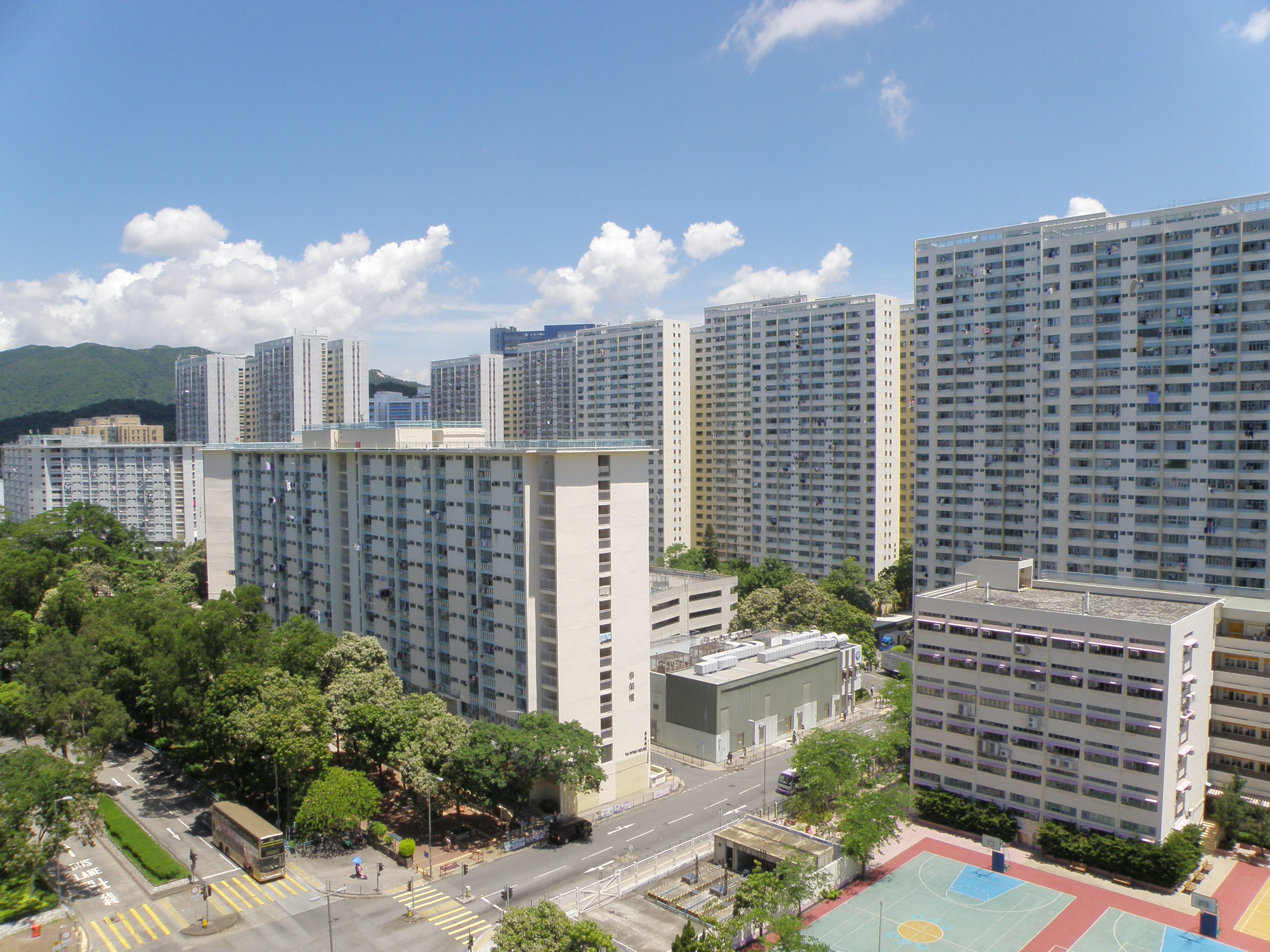
- Tai Yuen Estate
- Interactive map of Tai Yuen Estate

General information
- Location: 10 Ting Kok Road, Tai Po; New Territories, Hong Kong
- Coordinates: 22.454006°N 114.167939°E
- Status: Completed
- Category: Public rental housing
- Population: 14,464 (2016)
- No. of blocks: 7
- No. of units: 4,876

Construction
- Constructed: 1980; 46 years ago
- Authority: Hong Kong Housing Authority

Tai Yuen Estate (Chinese: 大元邨) is a public housing estate in Tai Po, New Territories, Hong Kong. It is the first public housing estate in Tai Po, located at the town centre of Tai Po New Town. It is built on the reclaimed land of Tai Po Hoi, the estate consists of 7 residential blocks completed in 1980.

Ting Nga Court (汀雅苑) is a Home Ownership Scheme court in Tai Po, near Tai Yuen Estate. It consists of three residential buildings built in 1981.

== Houses ==
=== Tai Yuen Estate ===
Name	Chinese name	Building type	Completed
Tai Yee House	泰怡樓	Triple H	1980
Tai Lok House	泰樂樓	Triple H	1980
Tai Ling House	泰寧樓	Double H	1980
Tai Yan House	泰欣樓	Double H	1980
Tai Tak House	泰德樓	Old Slab	1981
Tai Wing House	泰榮樓	Old Slab	1980
Tai Man House	泰民樓	Old Slab	1980

=== Ting Nga Court ===
Name	Chinese name	Building type	Completed
Nga Yin House	雅賢閣	Old-Cruciform	1981
Nga Man House	雅文閣	Old-Cruciform	1981
Nga Kwan House	雅群閣	Old-Cruciform	1981

== Demographics ==
According to the 2016 by-census, Tai Yuen Estate had a population of 14,464. The median age was 46.7 and the majority of residents (98.4 per cent) were of Chinese ethnicity. The average household size was 2.9 people. The median monthly household income of all households (i.e. including both economically active and inactive households) was HK$20,000.

== Politics ==
For the 2019 District Council election, the estate fell within two constituencies. Tai Yuen Estate is located in the Tai Yuen constituency, which is currently represented by Au Chun-ho, while Ting Nga Court falls within the Chung Ting constituency, which was formerly represented by Man Nim-chi until July 2021.

== See also ==
- Public housing estates in Tai Po
