= Mandrin =

Mandrin may refer to:

- Mandrin (medical equipment), a metal guide for flexible catheters
- Mandrin (1924 film), a silent French film directed by Henri Fescourt
- Mandrin (1947 film), a film starring Armand Bernard
- The Adventures of Mandrin, a 1952 film starring Raf Vallone
- Mandrin (1962 film), a film set in Pérouges
- Mandrin Cave in France, where habitation has alternated between Neanderthals and modern humans

== People with the name ==
- Louis Mandrin (1725–1755), French brigand

== See also ==
- Mandarin (disambiguation)
