= Mandrel (disambiguation) =

A mandrel is an object used to shape machined work, a tool component that grips or clamps materials to be machined, or a tool component that can be used to grip other moving tool components

Mandrel may also refer to:

- Mandrel (bending), a device inserted into a pipe or tube to keep it from collapsing during bending
- Mandrel (catheter), the metal guide for flexible catheters
- Mandrel (Doctor Who), monster from the serial Nightmare of Eden
- Mandrel (electronics) was the code-name of a World War II electronic counter-measure used by the RAF.
- Mandrel Screen, a Royal Air Force aviation patrol in December 1942 employing the radar jammers during World War II
- Mandrel wrapping, a technique used in multimode fiberoptics
- Operation Mandrel, a series of 53 American nuclear tests in 1969 and 1970

== See also ==
- Mandrell
- Mandrill
