= Public housing estates in Tai Po =

Public housing in Tai Po, Hong Kong

The following is a list of public housing estates in Tai Po, Hong Kong, including Home Ownership Scheme (HOS), Private Sector Participation Scheme (PSPS), Sandwich Class Housing Scheme (SCHS), Flat-for-Sale Scheme (FFSS), and Tenants Purchase Scheme (TPS) estates.

== Overview ==
Name		Type	Inaug.	No Blocks	No Units	Notes
Chung Nga Court	頌雅苑	HOS	1991	3	2,040	
Elegance Garden	富雅花園	PSPS	1990	4	1,060	
Fu Heng Estate	富亨邨	TPS	1990	8	2,229	
Fu Shin Estate	富善邨	TPS	1985	6	4,600	
Fu Tip Estate	富蝶邨	Public	2021	1	655	
King Nga Court	景雅苑	HOS	1992	2	700	
Kwong Fuk Estate	廣福邨	Public	1983	8	6,189	
Ming Nga Court	明雅苑	HOS	1985	3	1,680	
Po Heung Estate	寶鄉邨	Public	2016	2	483	
Po Nga Court	寶雅苑	HOS	1989	3	2,448	
Sun Hing Garden	新興花園	PSPS	1986	5	1,460	
Tai Po Plaza	大埔廣場	PSPS	1985	5	1,480	
Tai Wo Estate	太和邨	TPS	1989	9	2,582	
Tai Yuen Estate	大元邨	Public	1980	7	4,876	
Tak Nga Court	德雅苑	HOS	1992	1	816	
Ting Nga Court	汀雅苑	HOS	1981	3	395	
Wan Tau Tong Estate	運頭塘邨	TPS	1991	3	2,675	
Wang Fuk Court	宏福苑	HOS	1983	~~8~~ 1	~~1,984~~ 248	7 of those were destroyed during 2025 Tai Po apartment fire
Yat Nga Court	逸雅苑	HOS	1991	2	1,224	
Yee Nga Court	怡雅苑	HOS	1993	5	1,750	

== Chung Nga Court ==
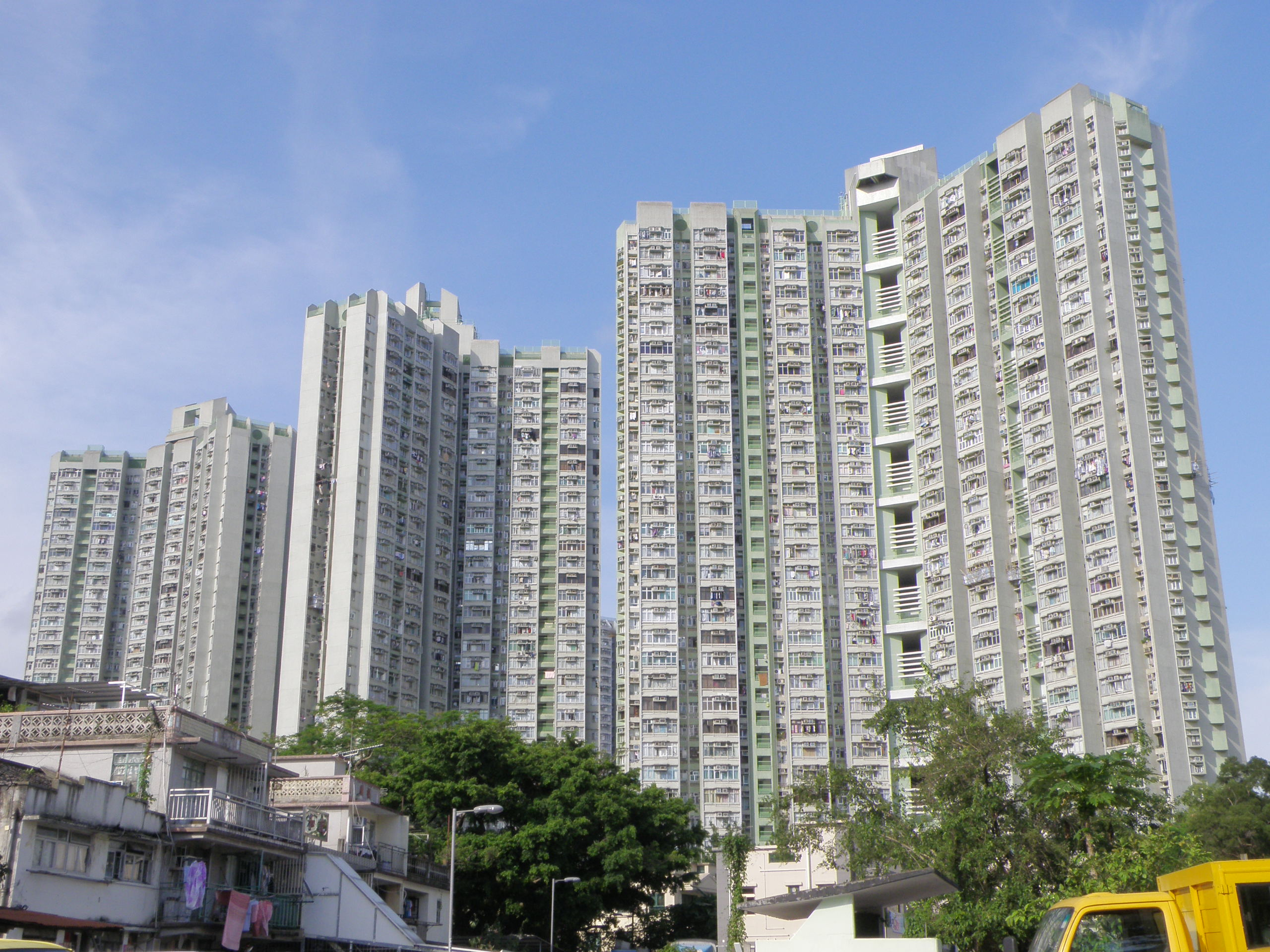
Chung Nga Court

Chung Nga Court (Chinese: 頌雅苑) is a Home Ownership Scheme estate in the north of Tai Po, located near Fu Heng Estate. It comprises three residential buildings built in 1991.

Name	Type	Completion
Chung Chun House	Trident 3	1991
Chung Sin House	Trident 4	1991
Chung May House	Trident 4	1991

== Elegance Garden ==
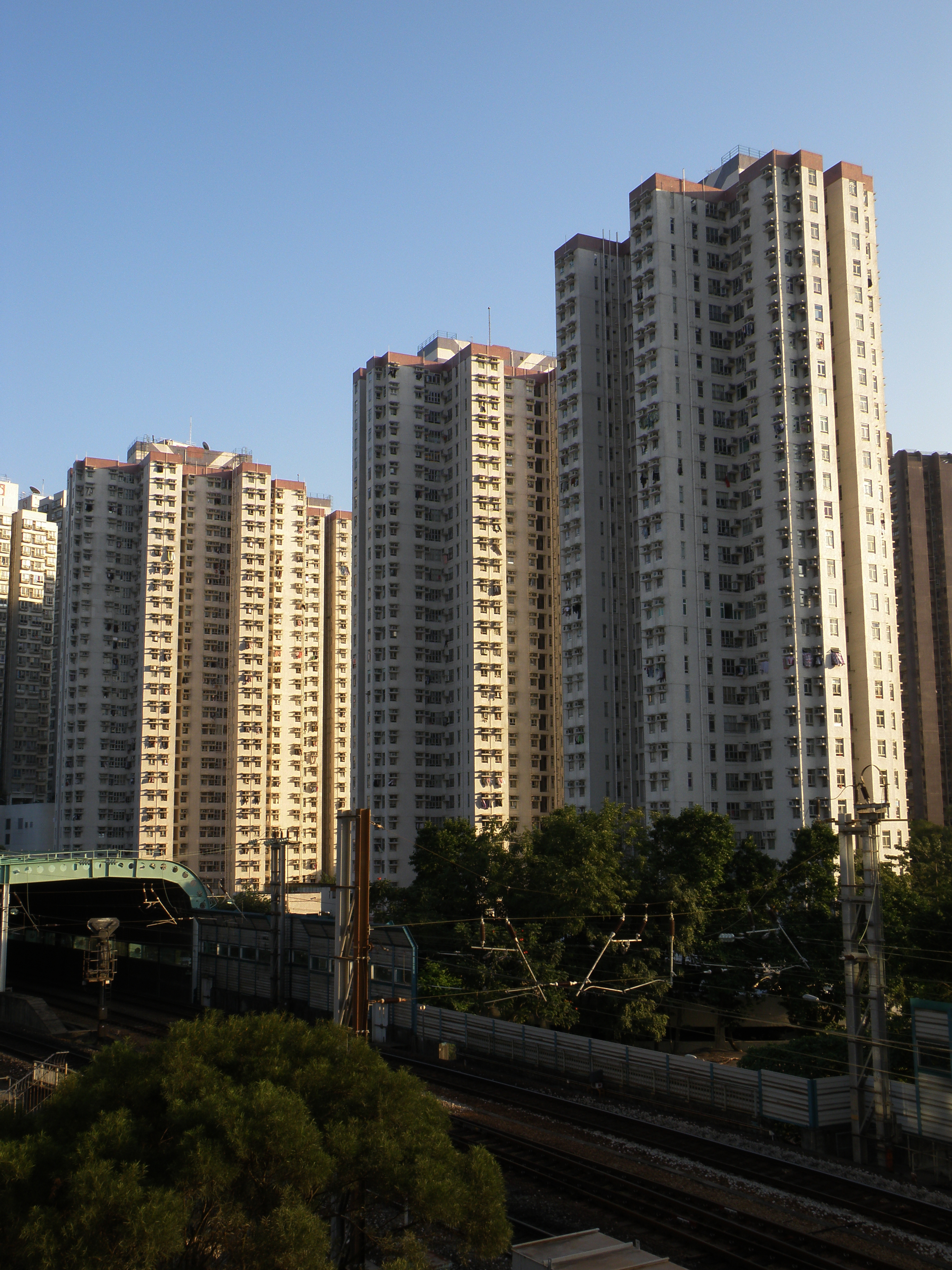
Elegance Garden

Elegance Garden (Chinese: 富雅花園) is a Private Sector Participation Scheme estate in Tai Po, near Uptown Plaza, Wan Tau Tong Estate and MTR Tai Po Market station. It was jointly developed by the Hong Kong Housing Authority and Chevalier Group. It has four blocks built in 1990.

Name	Type	Completion
Block 1	Private Sector Participation Scheme	1990
Block 2	Private Sector Participation Scheme	1990
Block 3	Private Sector Participation Scheme	1990
Block 4	Private Sector Participation Scheme	1990

== Fu Heng Estate ==
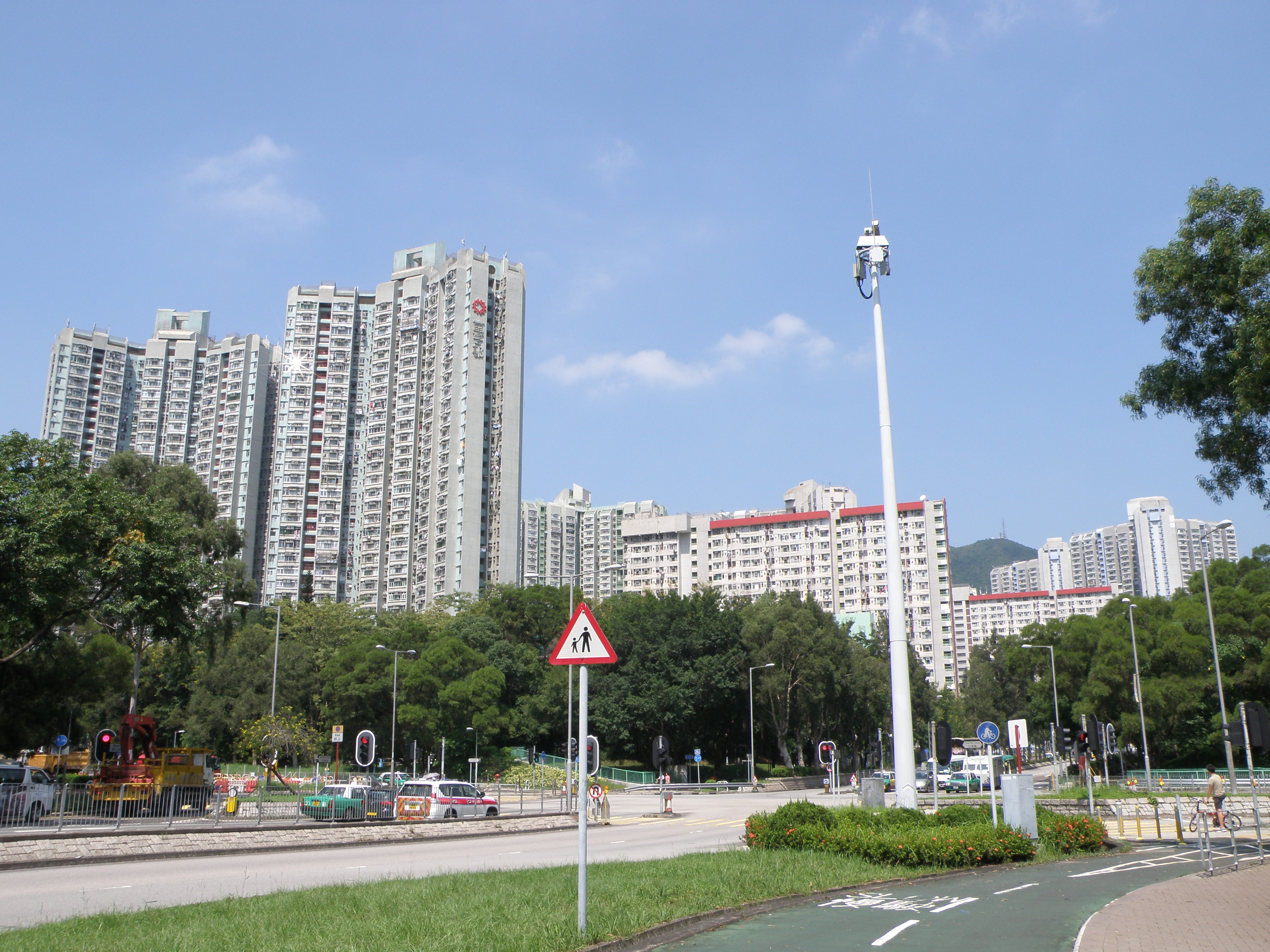
Fu Heng Estate

Fu Heng Estate (Chinese: 富亨邨) is a mixed estate consisting of 8 residential buildings completed in 1990. Some of the flats were sold to tenants through Tenants Purchase Scheme Phase 3 in 2000.

Name	Type	Completion
Heng Shing House	New Slab	1990
Heng Yue House	New Slab	1990
Heng Wing House	Trident 3	1990
Heng Tsui House	Trident 3	1990
Heng Yiu House	Trident 3	1990
Heng Tai House	Trident 4	1990
Heng Cheong House	Trident 4	1990
Heng Lung House	Trident 4	1990

== Fu Shin Estate ==
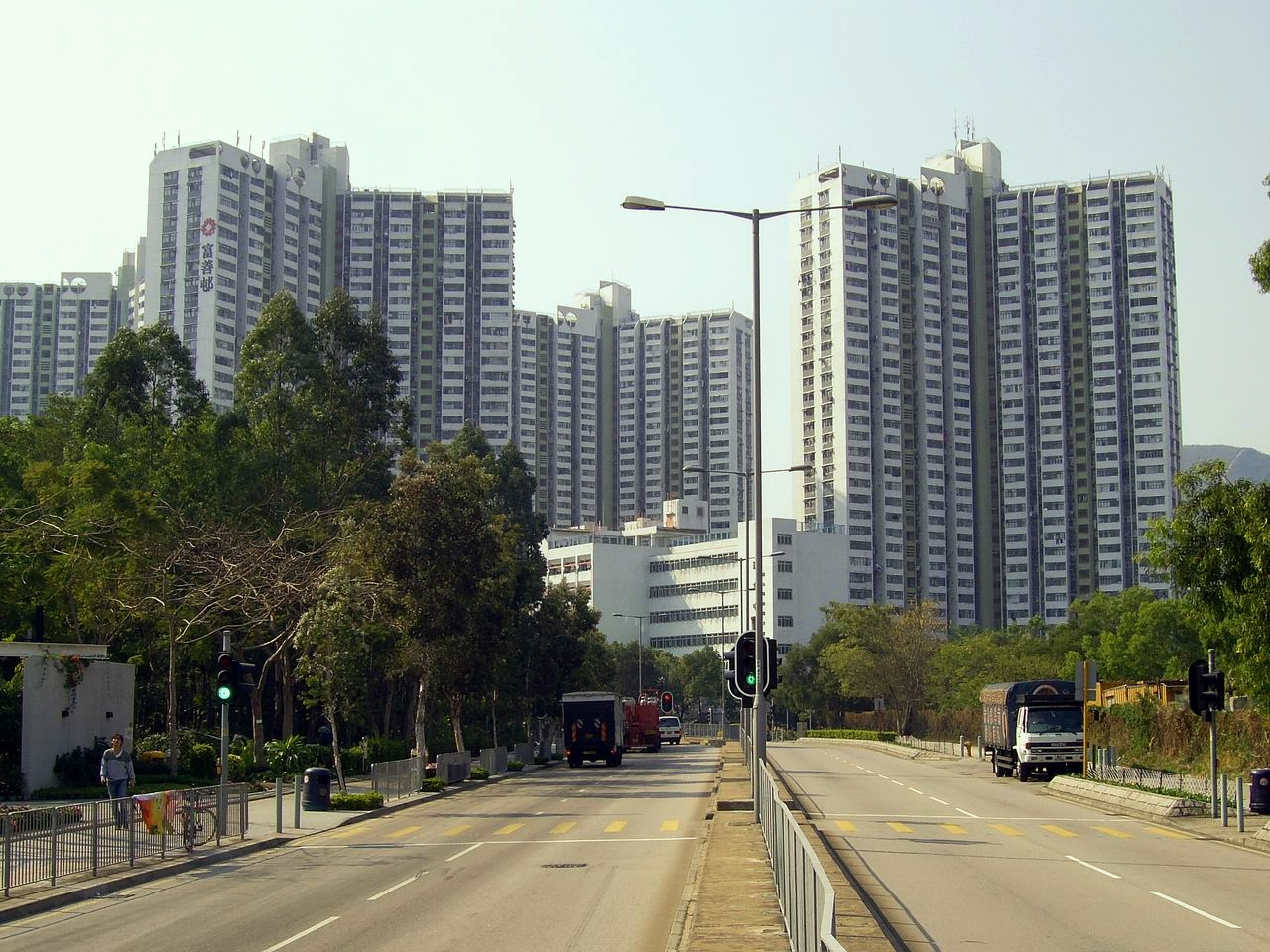
Fu Shin Estate

Fu Shin Estate (Chinese: 富善邨) is a mixed public housing and TPS estate, built on the reclaimed land of Tai Po Hoi. The estate consists of six residential blocks completed in 1985. In 2005, some of the flats were sold to tenants through Tenants Purchase Scheme Phase 6B.

Name	Type	Completion
Shin Kwan House	Trident 1	1985
Shin Lun House	Trident 1	1985
Shin King House	Trident 2	1985
Shin Mei House	Trident 2	1985
Shin Nga House	Trident 2	1985
Shin Tsui House	Trident 2	1985

=== Lift plunge incident ===
On 25 October 2008, a lift at Shin Nga House, Fu Shin Estate suddenly plunged 14 storeys, but no one was injured. This raised concerns on lift safety. The government later confirmed the incident was caused by the failure of the counterweight pulley bearing, which caused the dislodgement of all eight suspension ropes from the counterweight.

== Fu Tip Estate ==
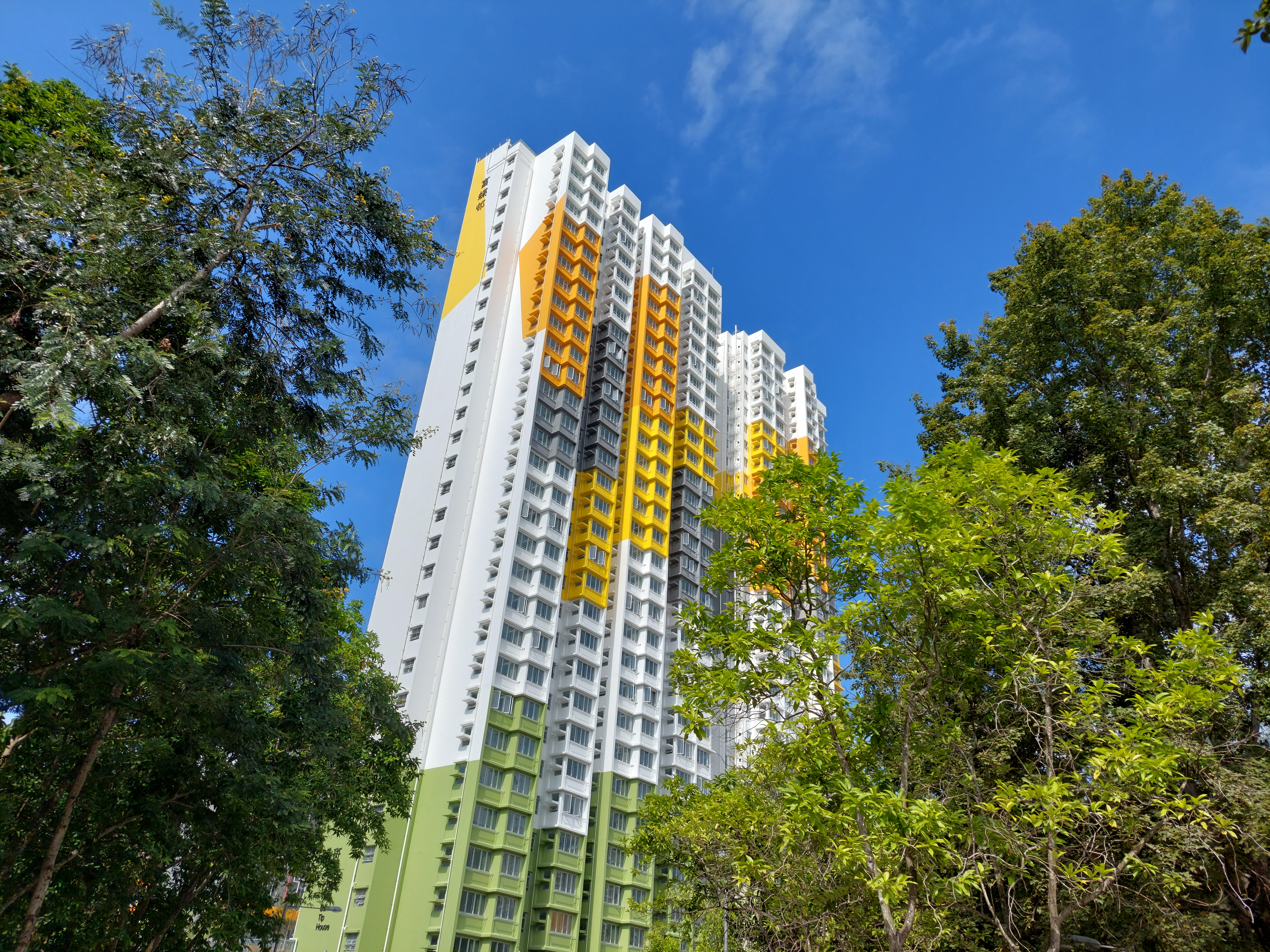
Fu Tip Estate

Fu Tip Estate (Chinese: 富蝶邨) is a public housing estate in Tai Po, New Territories, Hong Kong near Fu Heng Estate and Tai Po Hospital. The housing estate will be completed in phases between 2021, 2024 and 2030.

Name	Chinese name	Building type	Completed
Ban Tip House	斑蝶樓	Non-standard	2021

== King Nga Court / Tak Nga Court / Yat Nga Court ==
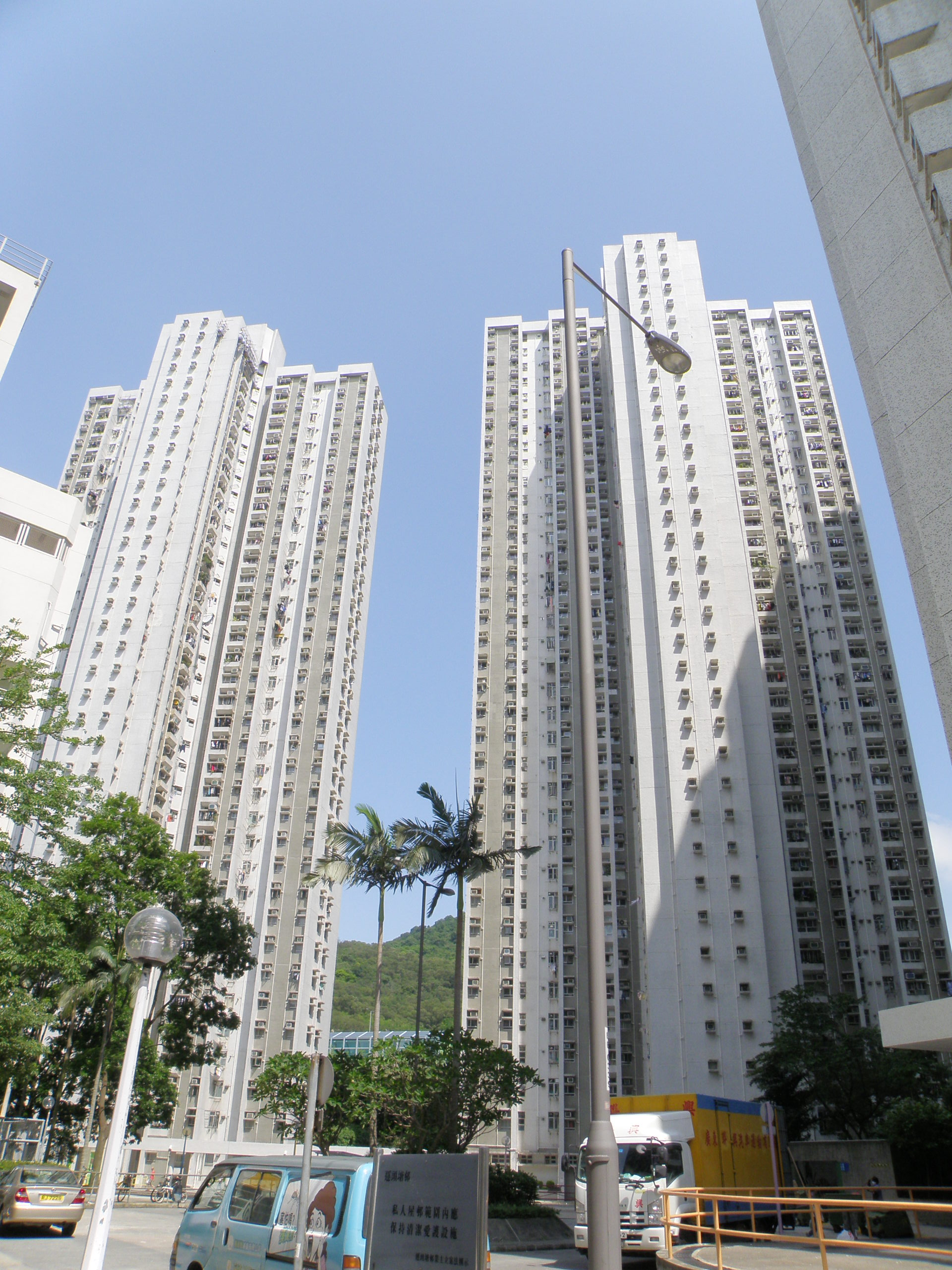
King Nga Court

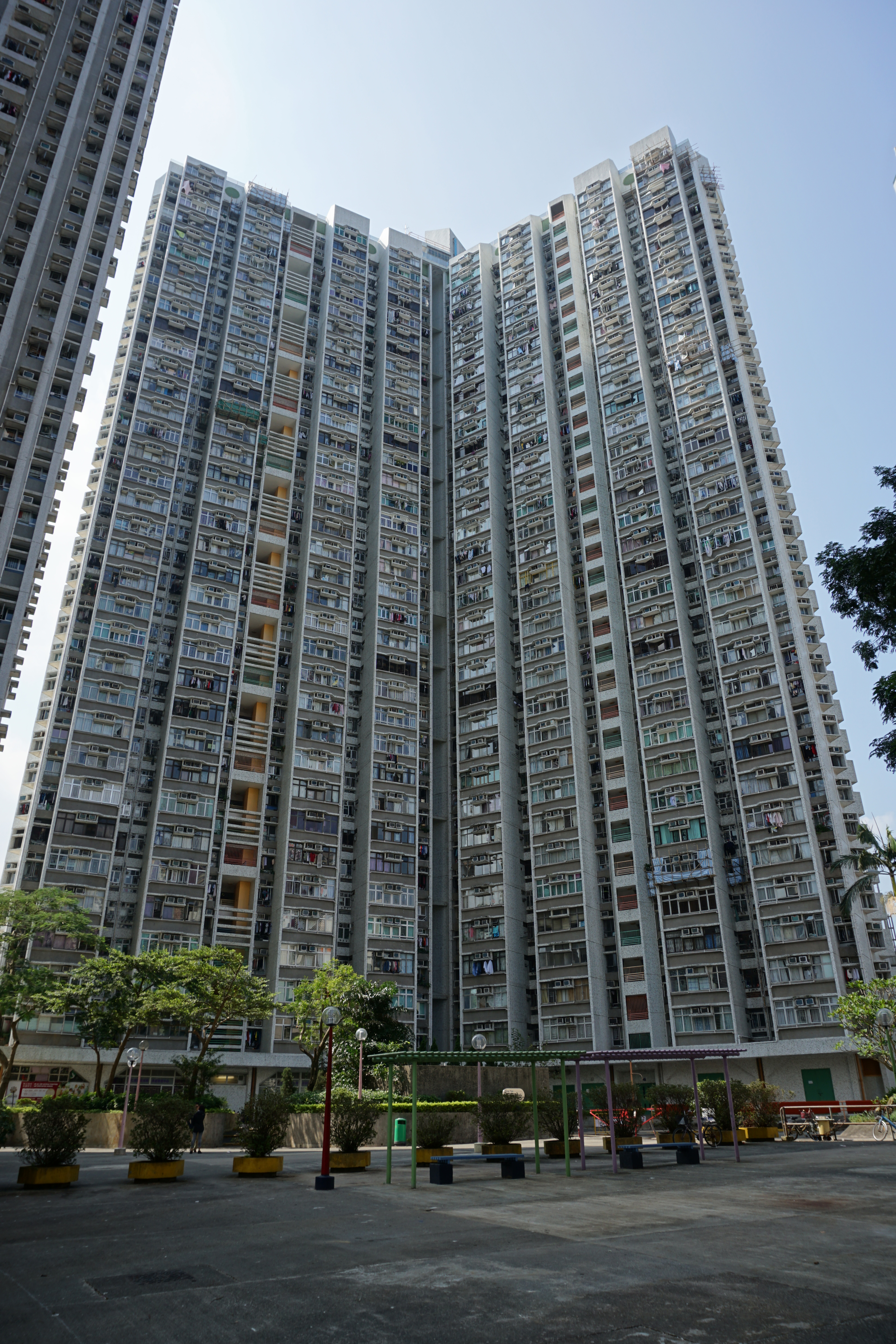
Tak Nga Court

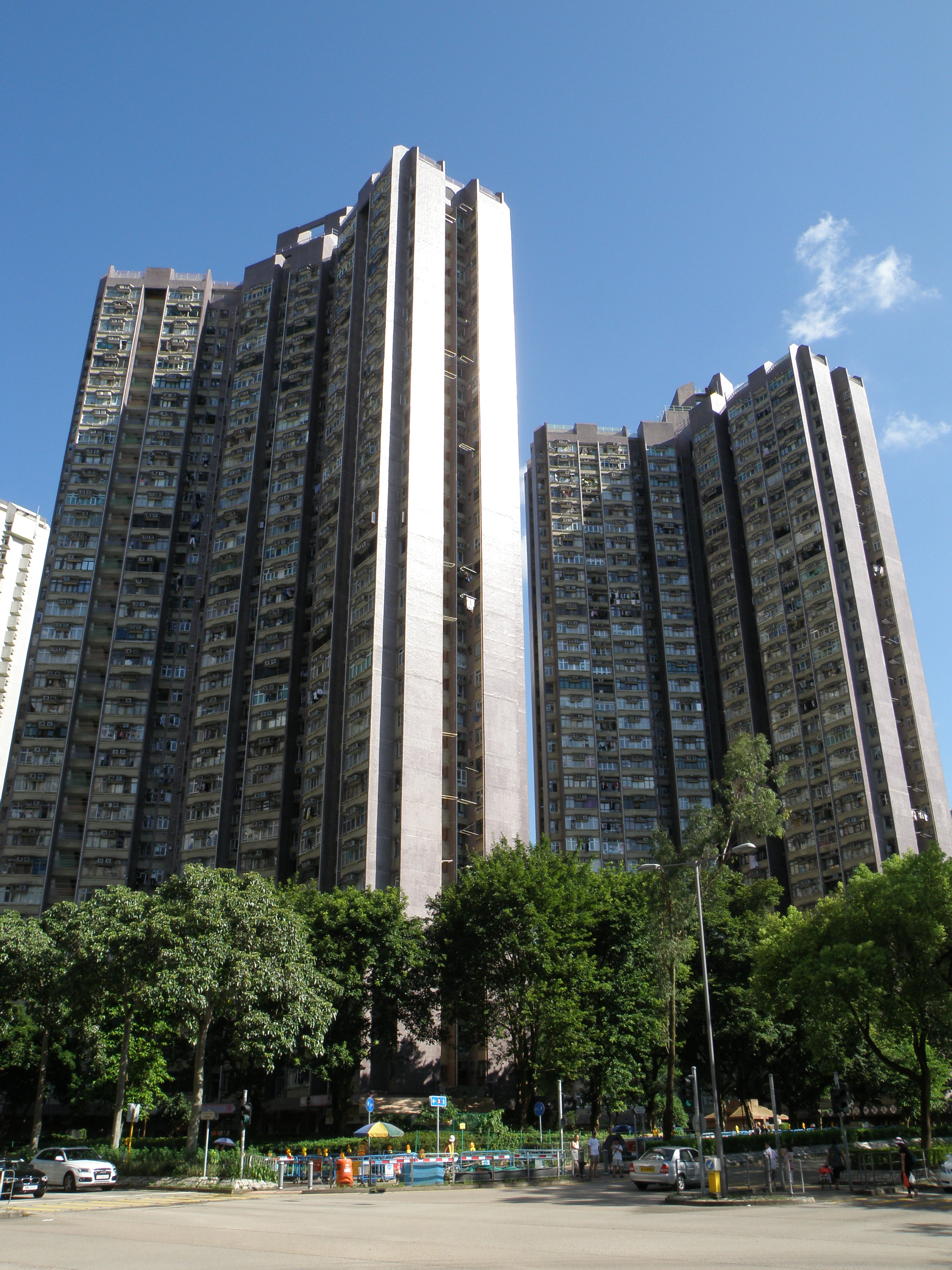
Yat Nga Court

The three HOS estates, King Nga Court (Chinese: 景雅苑), Tak Nga Court (Chinese: 德雅苑) and Yat Nga Court (Chinese: 逸雅苑), are built near Wan Tau Tong Estate between 1991 and 1992.

Court	Name	Type	Completion
Yat Nga Court	Yat Wing House	Trident 4	1991
Yat Nga Court	Yat Yan House	Trident 4	1991
King Nga Court	King Yan House	NCB (Ver.1984)	1992
King Nga Court	King Yuet House	NCB (Ver.1984)	1992
Tak Nga Court		Trident 3	1992

== Kwong Fuk Estate ==
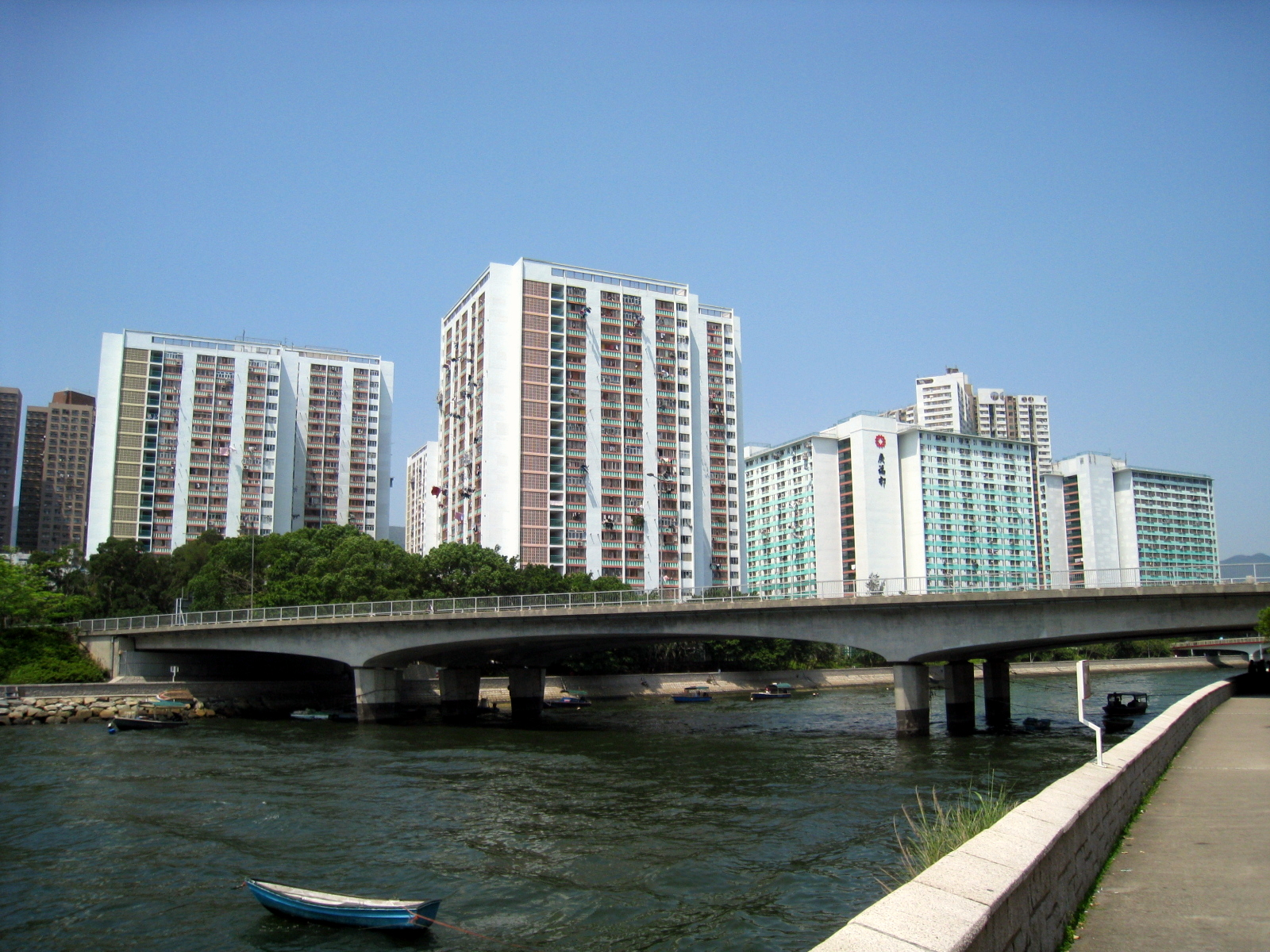
Kwong Fuk Estate

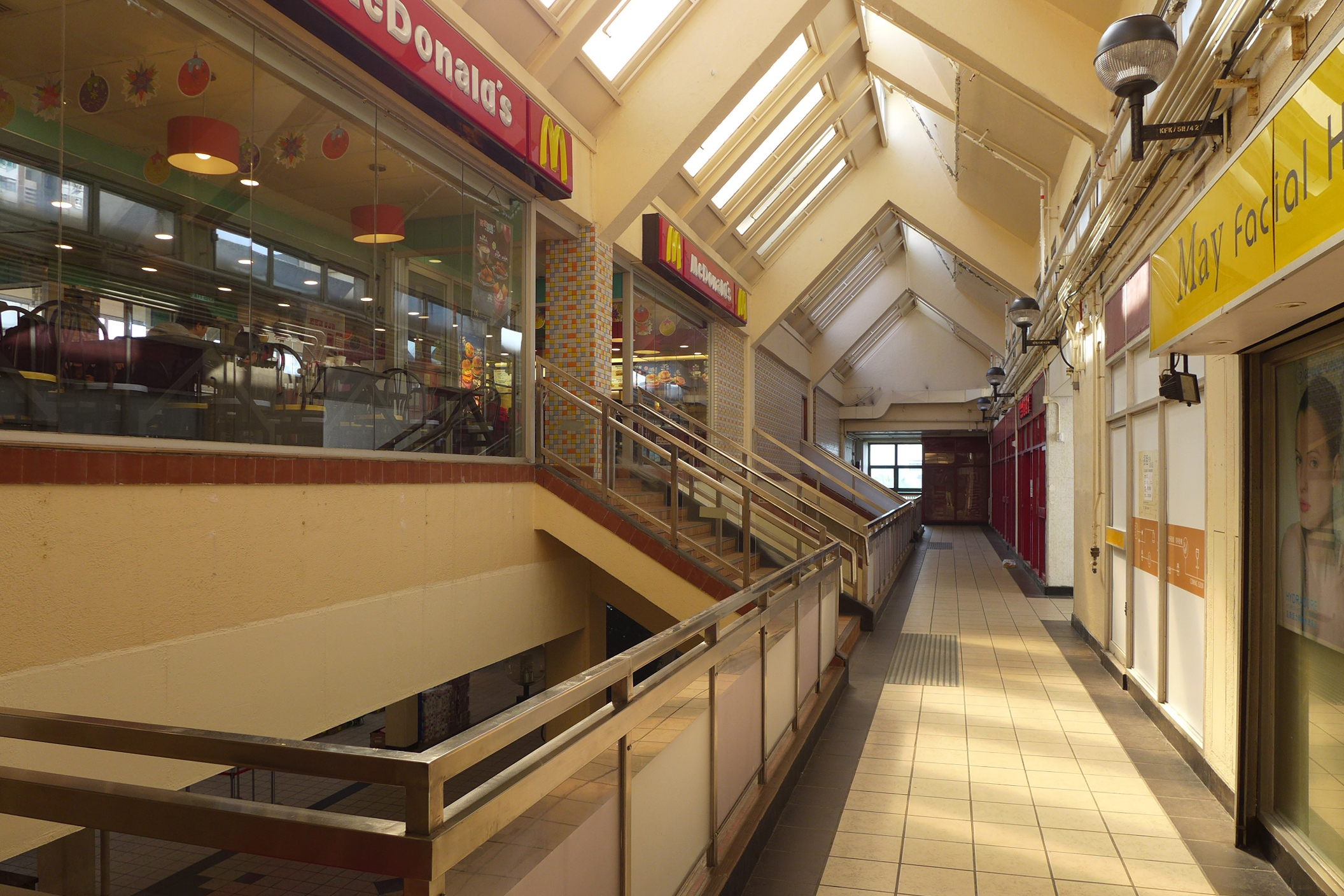
Kwong Fuk Shopping Centre

Kwong Fuk Estate (Chinese: 廣福邨) is the second public housing estate in Tai Po. Built at the reclaimed land at the east of Tai Po Old Market near Yuen Chau Tsai, the estate consists of eight residential buildings completed in 1983.

Name	Type	Completion
Kwong Yan House	Old Slab	1983
Kwong Wai House	Old Slab	1984
Kwong Lai House	Twin Tower	1983
Kwong Yi House	Twin Tower	1983
Kwong Yau House	Twin Tower	1983
Kwong Ping House	Twin Tower	1983
Kwong Chi House	Trident 2	1985
Kwong Shung House	Trident 2	1985

== Ming Nga Court ==
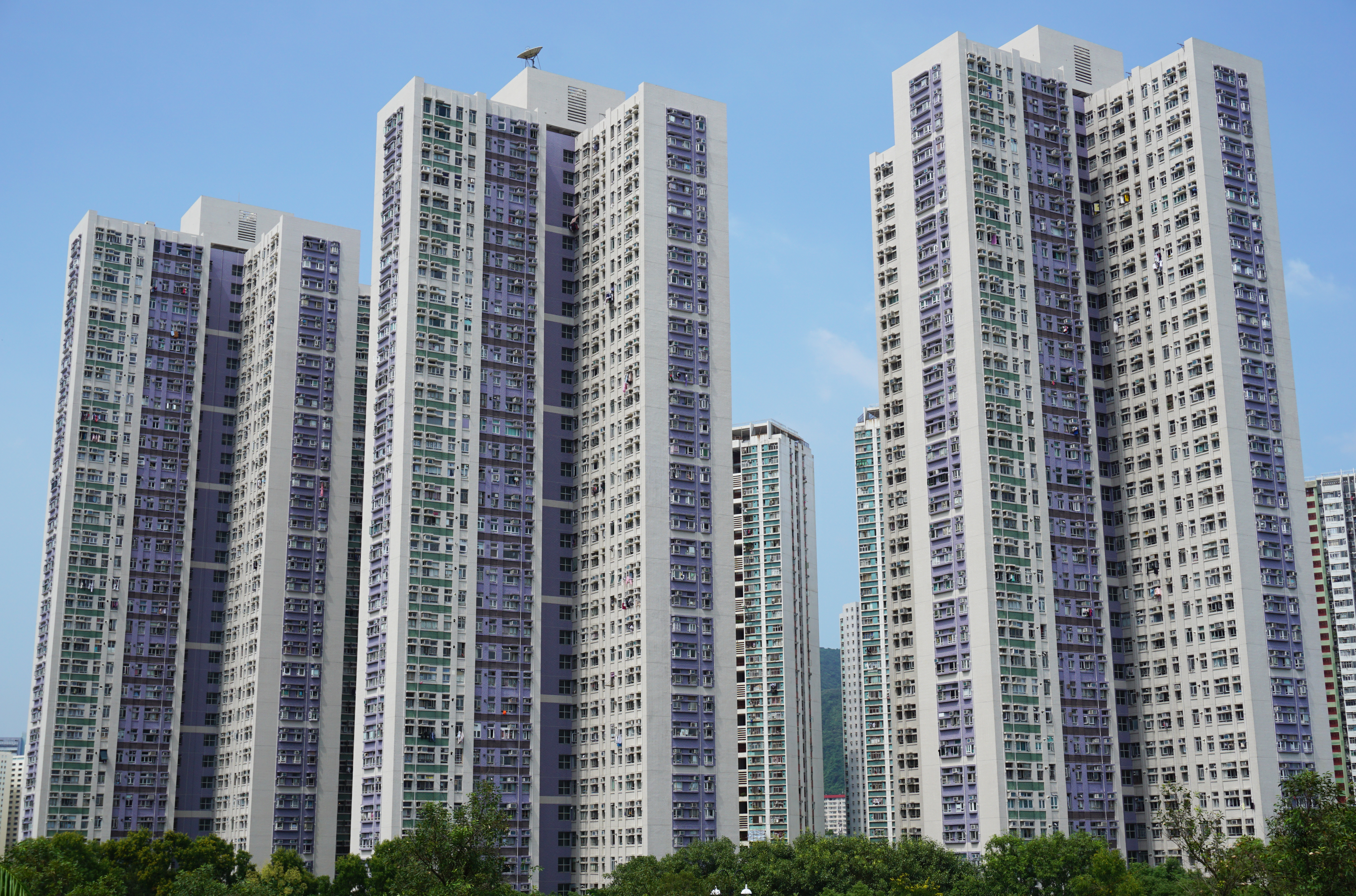
Ming Nga Court

Ming Nga Court (Chinese: 明雅苑) is a Home Ownership Scheme estate in Tai Po, located at the reclaimed land of Tai Po Hoi next to Fu Shin Estate and Yee Nga Court. It was developed by Hong Kong Housing Authority in 1985.

Name	Type	Completion
Ming Hoi House	Windmill	1985
Ming Yan House	Windmill	1985
Ming Cheong House	Windmill	1985

== Po Heung Estate ==
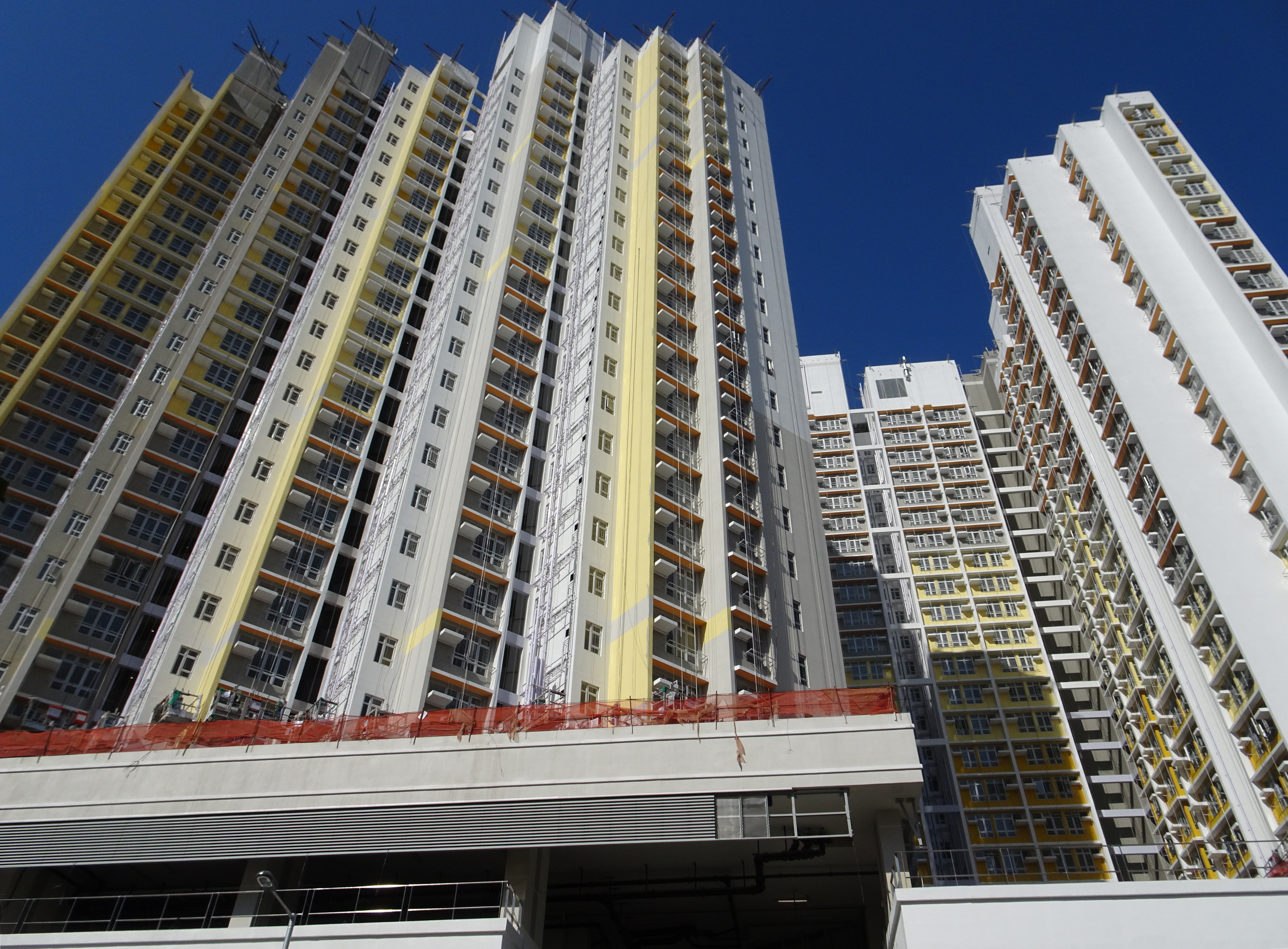
Po Heung Estate

Po Heung Estate (Chinese: 寶鄉邨) is a public housing estate in Po Heung Street, Tai Po, which has 2 blocks with totally 483 flats. Its location was formerly the office of Tai Po Rural Committee and Tai Po Temporary Market. It was completed in 2016.

== Po Nga Court ==
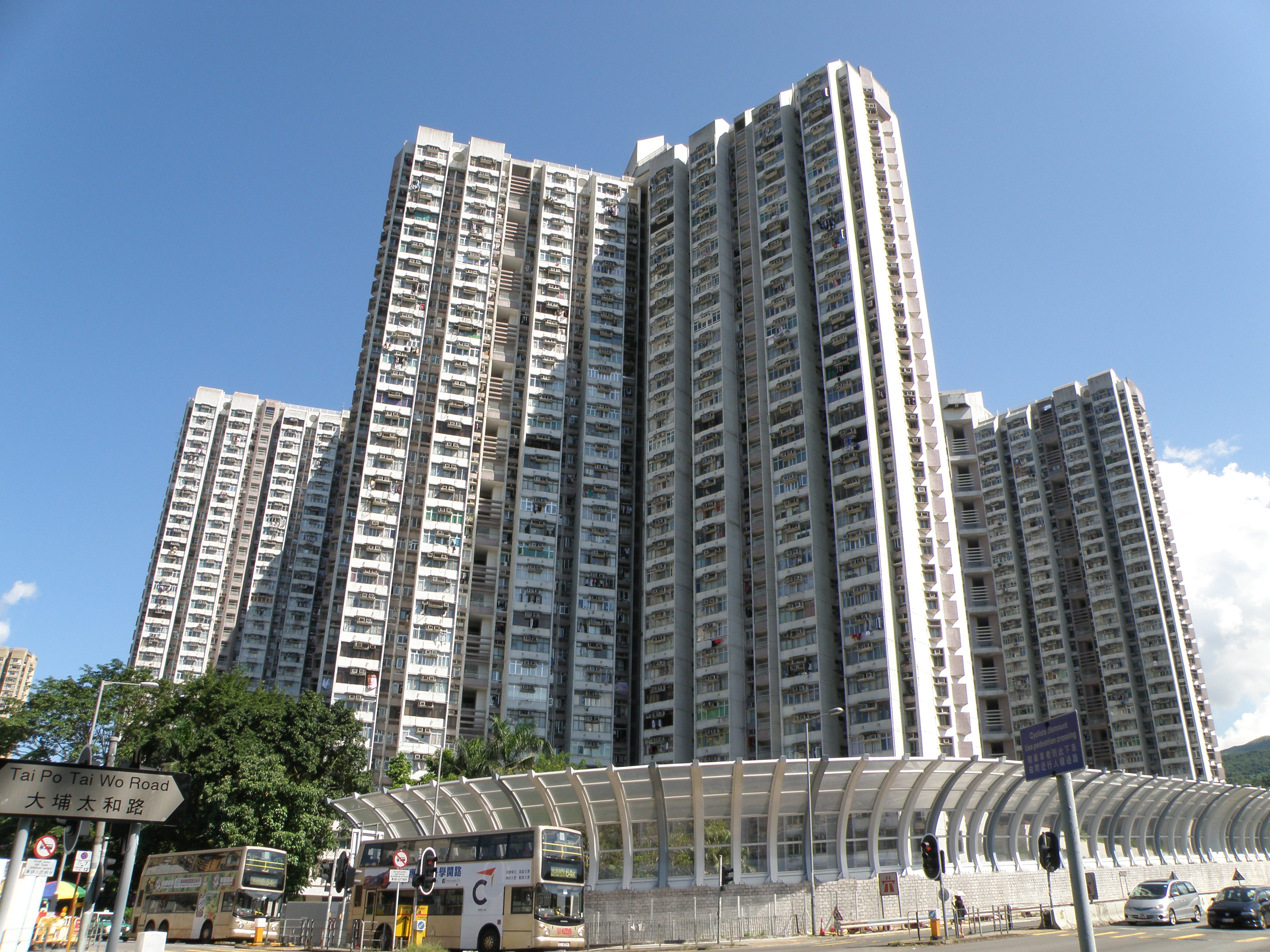
Po Nga Court

Po Nga Court (Chinese: 寶雅苑) is a HOS estate near Tai Wo Estate, which has 3 residential buildings completed in 1989.

Name	Type	Completion
Yat Wo House	Trident 3	1989
Hing Wo House	Trident 3	1989
Ka Wo House	Trident 3	1989

== Sun Hing Garden ==
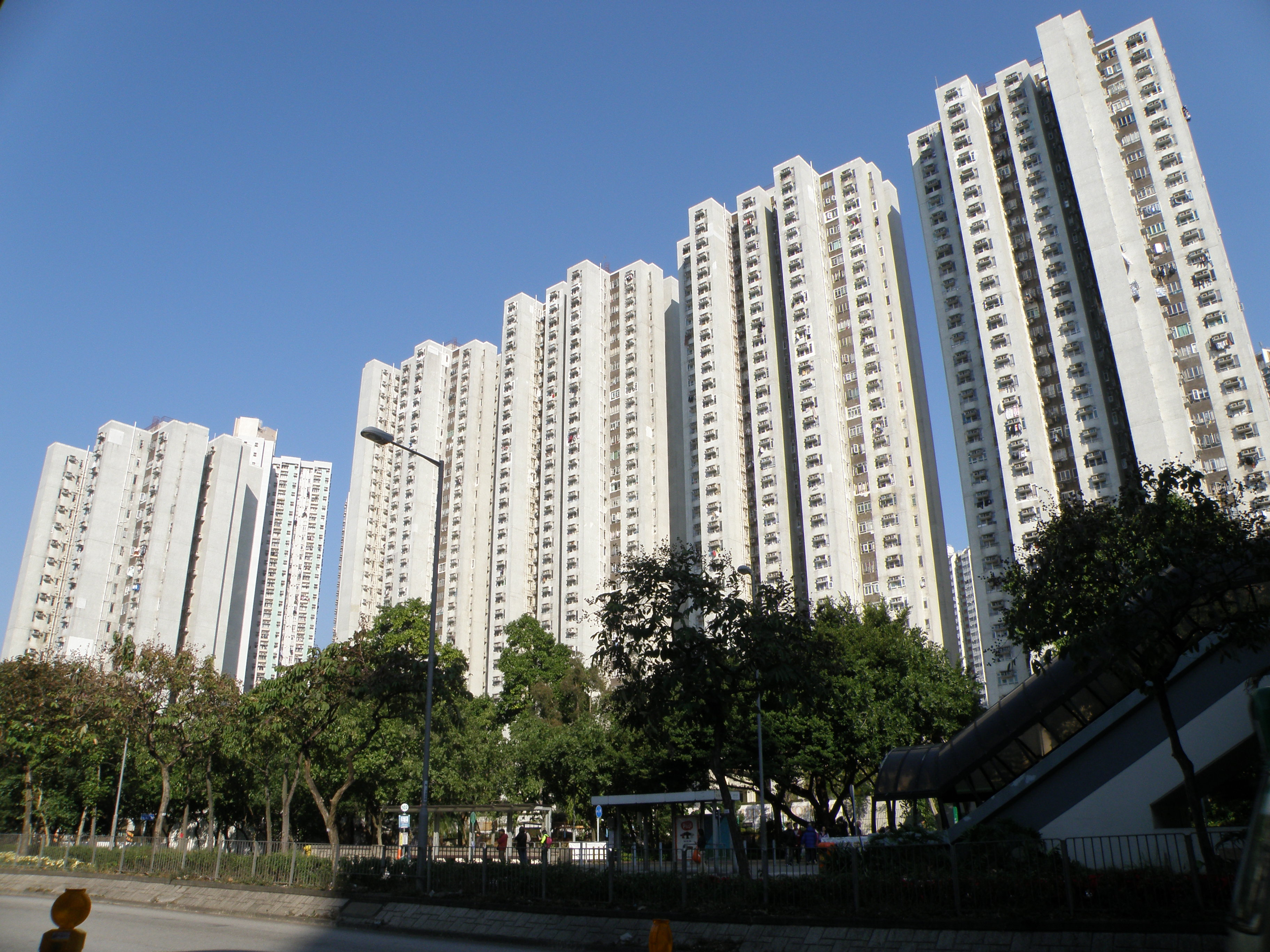
Sun Hing Garden

Sun Hing Garden is a Private Sector Participation Scheme estate in Tai Po, near Fu Shin Estate, Chung Nga Court, Ming Nga Court. Built on the reclaimed land of Tai Po Hoi, the estate consists of 5 blocks built in 1986.

Name	Type	Completion
Hong Che Court (Block 1)	Private Sector Participation Scheme	1986
Hong Yan Court (Block 2)	Private Sector Participation Scheme	1986
Hong Shun Court (Block 3)	Private Sector Participation Scheme	1986
Hong Shing Court (Block 4)	Private Sector Participation Scheme	1986
Hong Man Court (Block 5)	Private Sector Participation Scheme	1986

== Tai Po Plaza ==
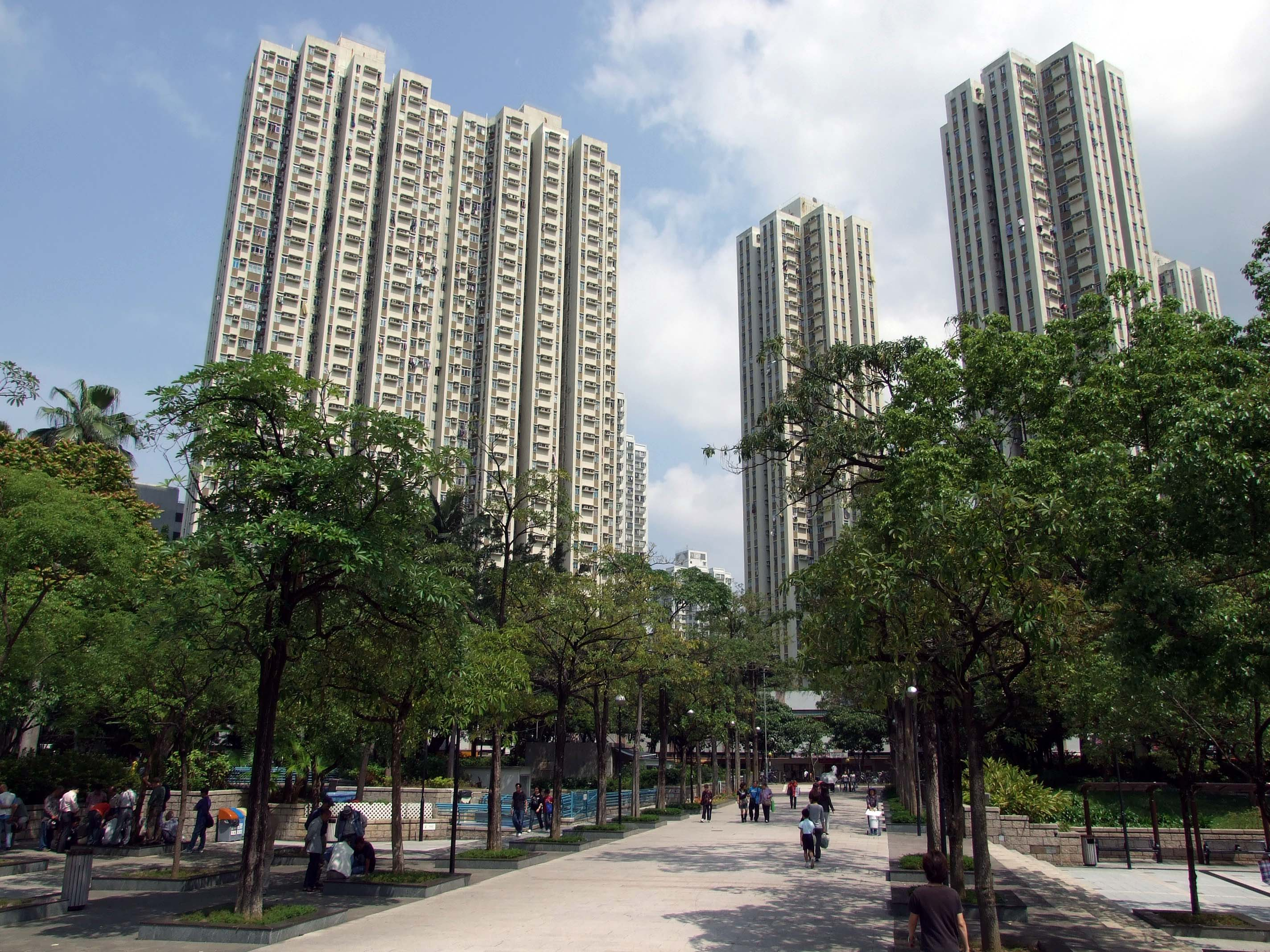
Tai Po Plaza

Tai Po Plaza (Chinese: 大埔廣場) is a Private Sector Participation Scheme estate in Tai Po, near Tai Po Centre, Tai Yuen Estate, Fortune Plaza and Tai Po Centre Bus Terminus. It was jointly developed by the Hong Kong Housing Authority and Shui On Group. It has totally 5 blocks completed in 1985.

Name	Type	Completion
Yee Fai Court	Private Sector Participation Scheme	1985
Yee Fu Court	Private Sector Participation Scheme	1985
Yee Hing Court	Private Sector Participation Scheme	1985
Yee Sing Court	Private Sector Participation Scheme	1985
Yee Tak Court	Private Sector Participation Scheme	1985

== Tai Wo Estate ==
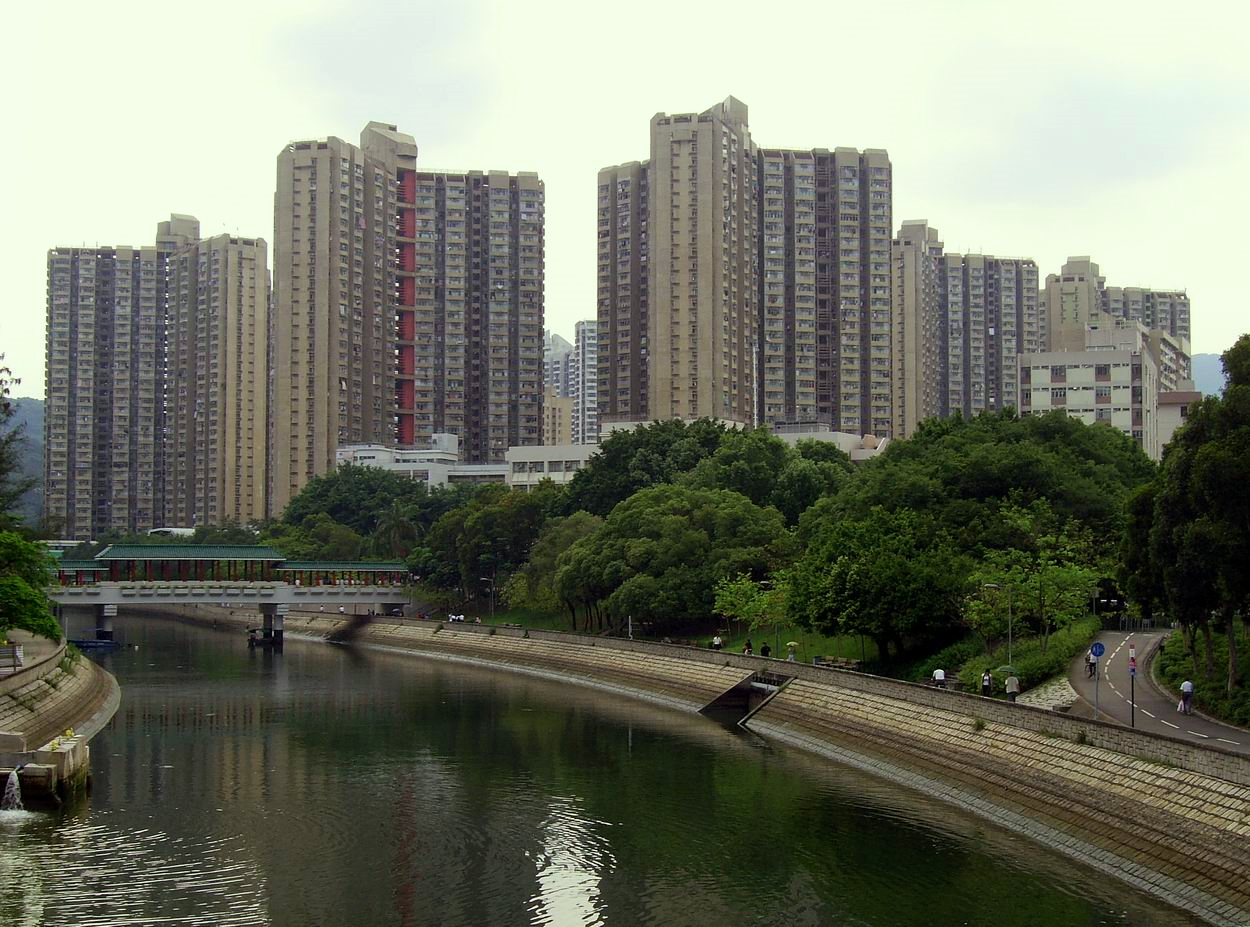
Tai Wo Estate

Tai Wo Estate (Chinese: 太和邨) consists of 9 residential buildings completed in 1989. It is one of the public housing estates in Tai Po that is not built on the reclaimed land. Some of the flats were sold to tenants through Tenants Purchase Scheme Phase 3 in 2000.

Name	Type	Completion
Oi Wo House	New Slab	1989
On Wo House	New Slab	1989
Hang Wo House	New Slab	1989
Fook Wo House	Trident 3	1989
Hei Wo House	Trident 3	1989
Kui Wo House	Trident 3	1989
Lai Wo House	Trident 3	1989
Sun Wo House	Trident 3	1989
Tsui Wo House	Trident 3	1989

== Tai Yuen Estate ==
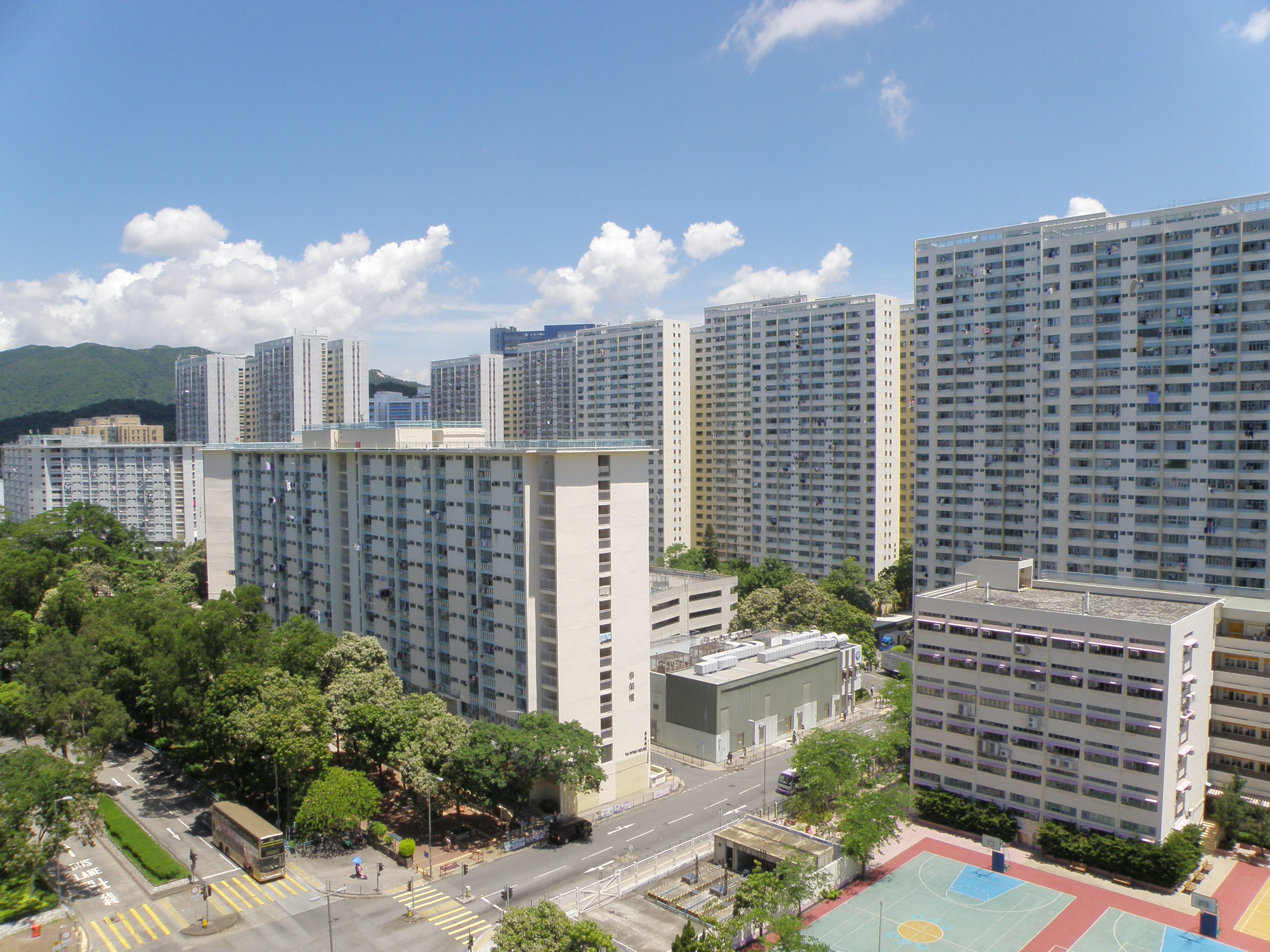
Tai Yuen Estate

Tai Yuen Estate (Chinese: 大元邨) is the first public housing estate in Tai Po, located at the town centre of Tai Po New Town. It is built on the reclaimed land of Tai Po Hoi, the estate consists of 7 residential blocks completed in 1980.

Name	Type	Completion
Tai Yee House	Triple H	1980
Tai Lok House	Triple H	1980
Tai Ling House	Double H	1980
Tai Yan House	Double H	1980
Tai Tak House	Old Slab	1981
Tai Wing House	Old Slab	1980
Tai Man House	Old Slab	1980

== Ting Nga Court ==
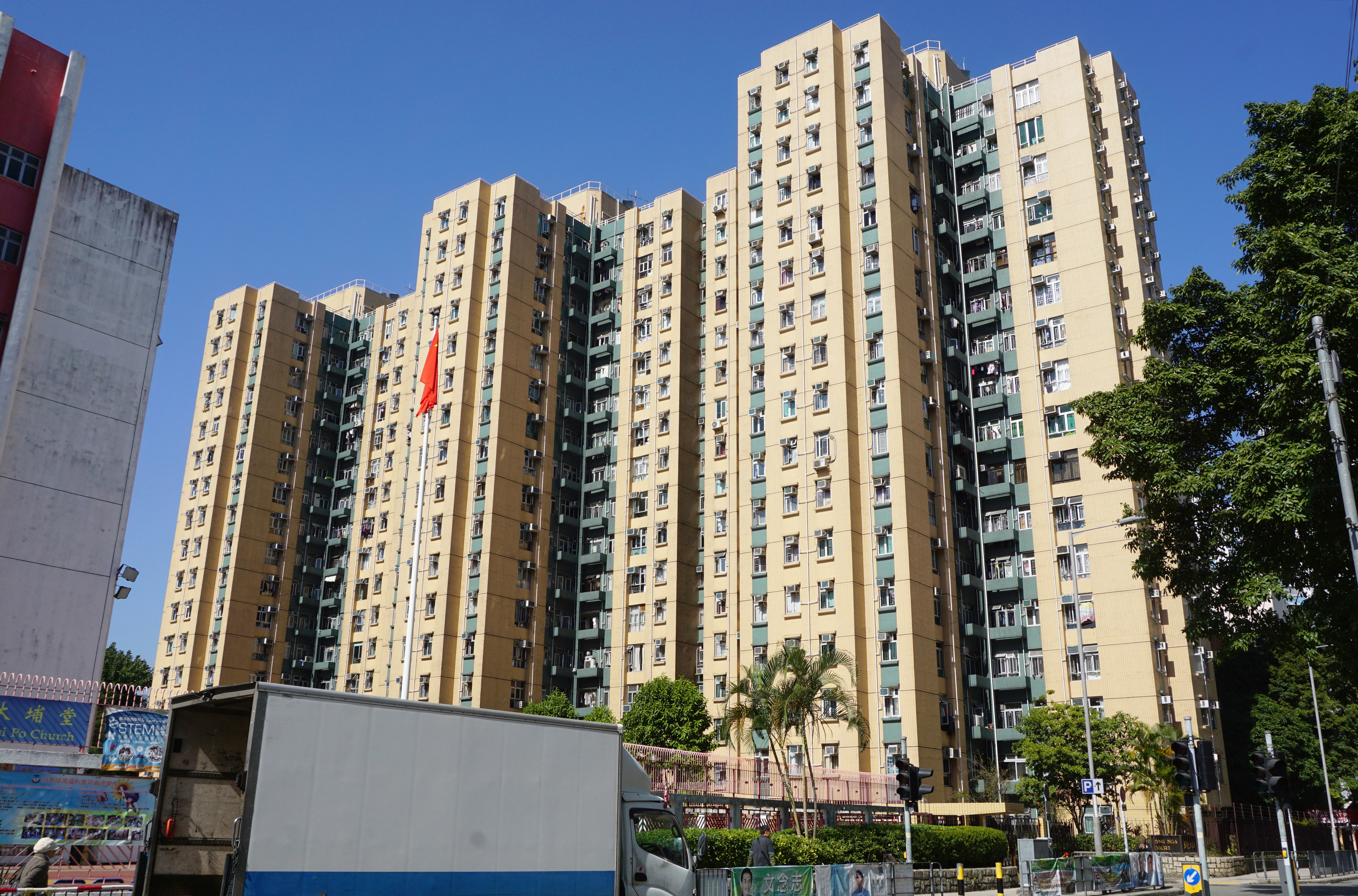
Ting Nga Court

Ting Nga Court (Chinese: 汀雅苑) is a Home Ownership Scheme estate in Tai Po, near Tai Yuen Estate. Built on the reclaimed land of Tai Po Hoi, It consists of 3 blocks completed in 1981.

Name	Type	Completion
Nga Yin House	Old-Cruciform	1981
Nga Man House	Old-Cruciform	1981
Nga Kwan House	Old-Cruciform	1981

== Wan Tau Tong Estate ==
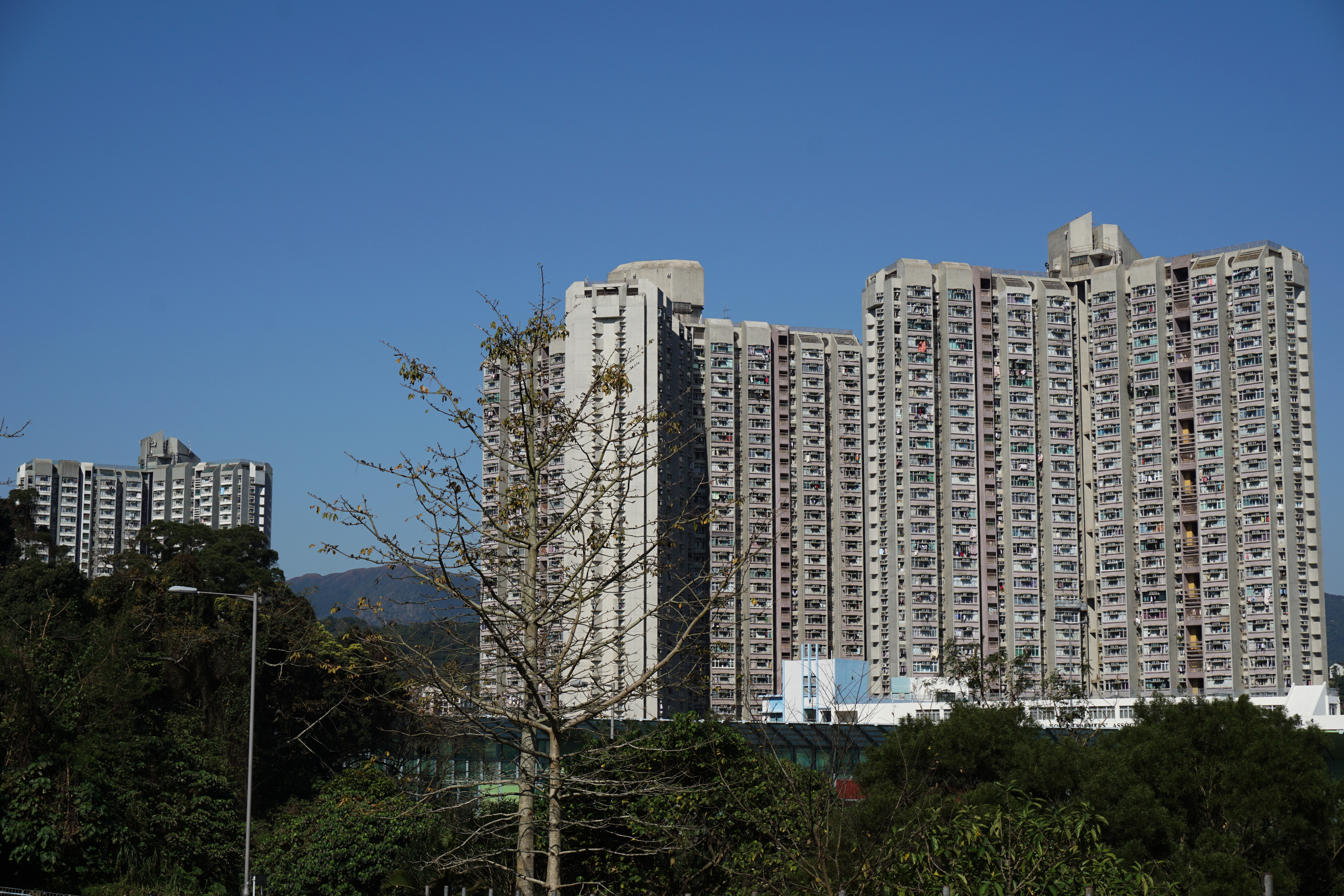
Wan Tau Tong Estate

Wan Tau Tong Estate (Chinese: 運頭塘邨) is the second last public housing estate in Tai Po, but it is not built on the reclaimed land. The estate consists of 3 residential buildings completed in 1991. Some of the flats were sold to tenants through Tenants Purchase Scheme Phase 1 in 1998.

Name	Type	Completion
Wan Hang House	Trident 3	1991
Wan Lam House	Trident 3	1991
Wan Loi House	Trident 3	1991

== Wang Fuk Court ==
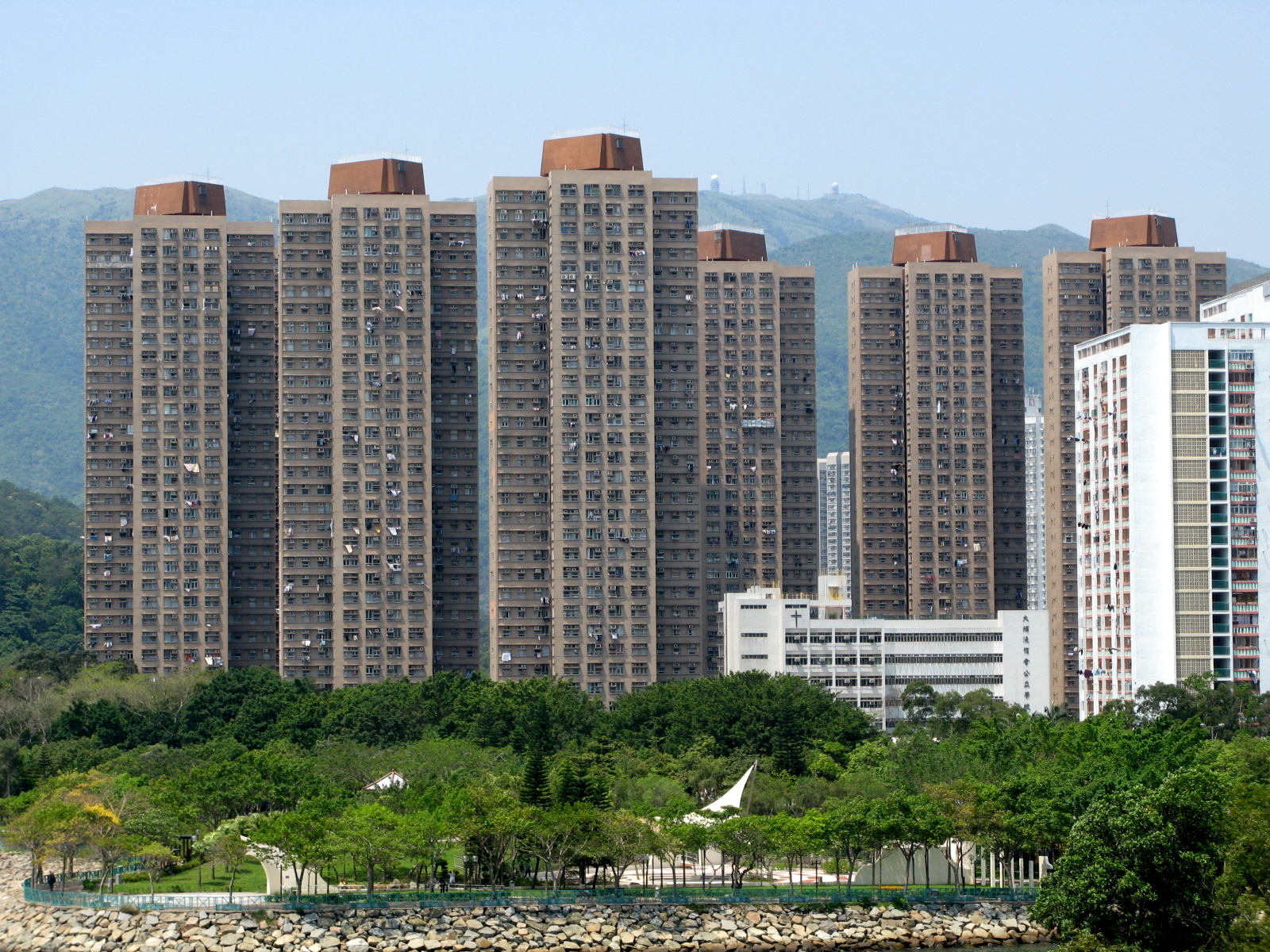
Wang Fuk Court

Wang Fuk Court (Chinese: 宏福苑) is a HOS estate in Tai Po, near Kwong Fuk Estate. It has 8 residential buildings, offering 1,987 units and built in 1983. Seven buildings were involved in the 2025 Tai Po apartment fire.

Name	Type	Completion
Wang Yan House	Flexi 2	1983
Wang Tao House	Flexi 2	1983
Wang Sun House	Flexi 2	1983
Wang Kin House	Flexi 2	1983
Wang Tai House	Flexi 2	1983
Wang Cheong House	Flexi 2	1983
Wang Shing House	Flexi 2	1983
Wang Chi House	Flexi 2	1983

== Yee Nga Court ==
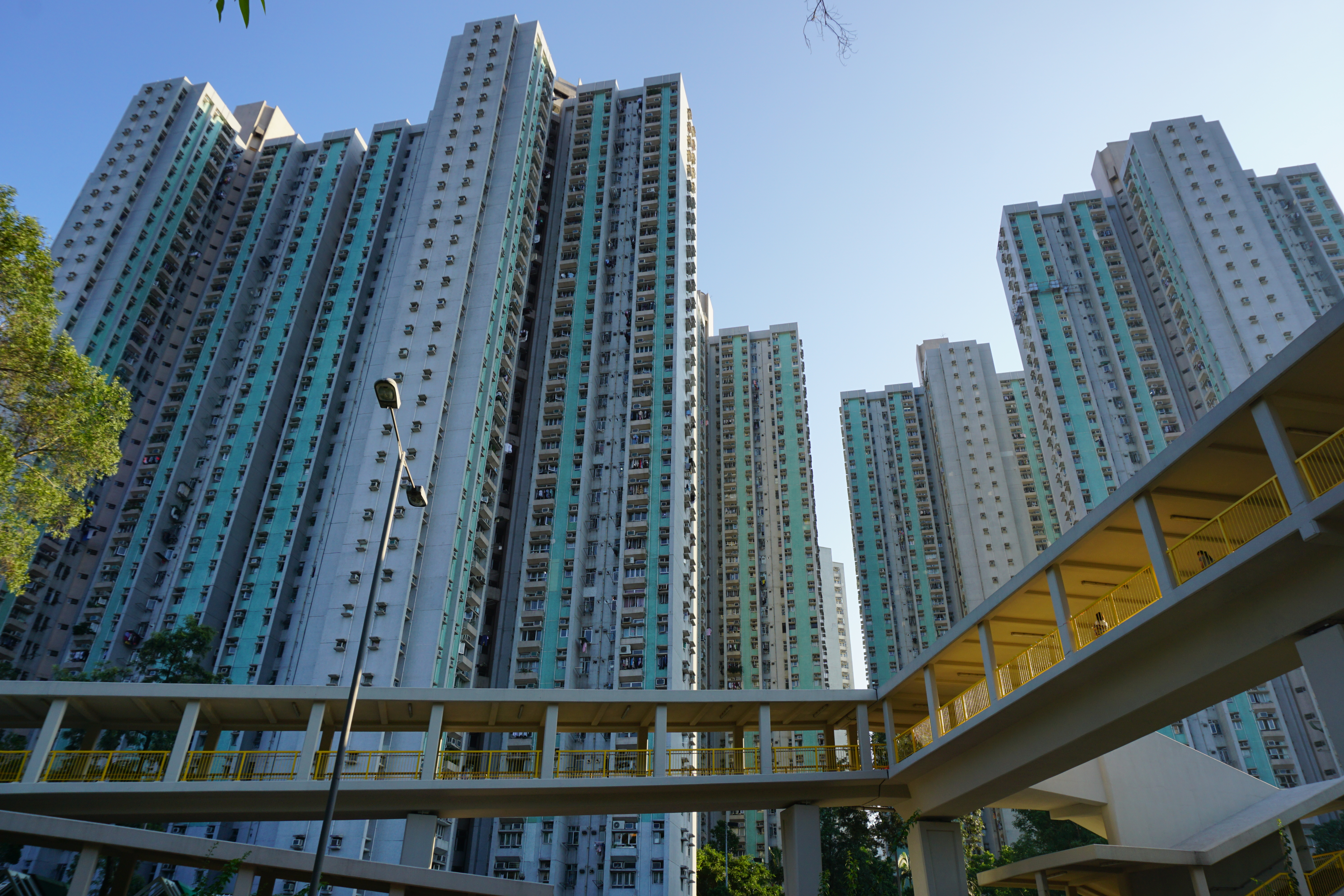
Yee Nga Court

Yee Nga Court (Chinese: 怡雅苑) is a Home Ownership Scheme estate in Tai Po, located at the reclaimed land of Tai Po Hoi next to Fu Shin Estate and Ming Nga Court. It was developed by Hong Kong Housing Authority in 1993.

Name	Type	Completion
Yee Lai House	NCB (Ver.1984)	1993
Yee Shun House	NCB (Ver.1984)	1993
Yee Hau House	NCB (Ver.1984)	1993
Yee Dat House	NCB (Ver.1984)	1993
Yee Leung House	NCB (Ver.1984)	1993

== See also ==
- Public housing in Hong Kong
- List of public housing estates in Hong Kong
