= Korean mandarin =

Korean mandarin may refer to either:

- The yangban, Korean scholar-bureaucrats
- Crested shelduck, the Korean relative of the mandarin duck
- Gamgyul, a type of mandarin orange found in the cuisine of Jeju

== See also ==
- Korean (disambiguation)
- Mandarin (disambiguation)
