= Wan Tau Tong Estate =

Public housing estate in Tai Po, Hong Kong

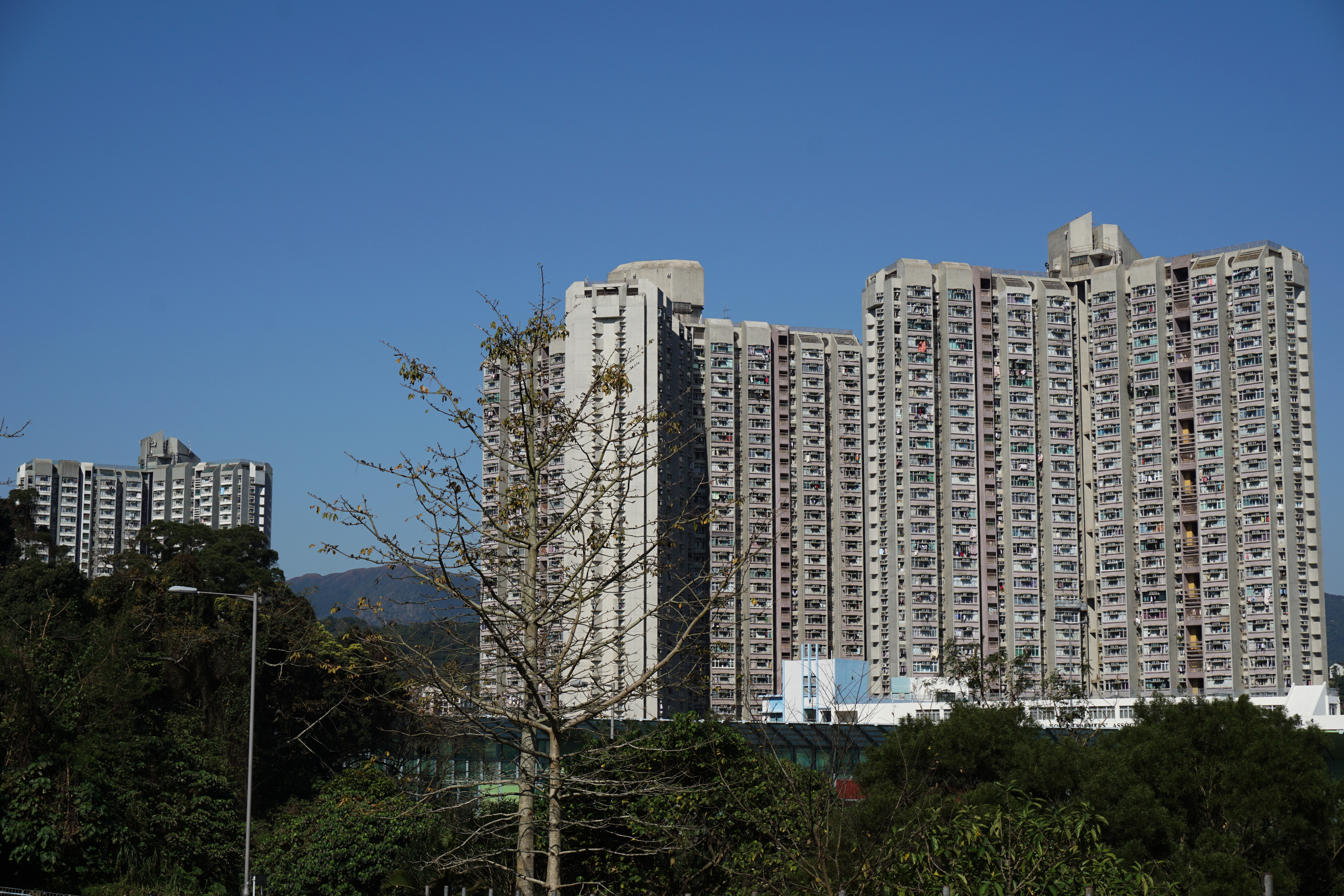
- Wan Tau Tong Estate
- Interactive map of Wan Tau Tong Estate

General information
- Location: 10 Hiu Wan Road, Tai Po; New Territories, Hong Kong
- Coordinates: 22.442293°N 114.1669677°E
- Status: Completed
- Category: Public rental housing
- Population: 10,860 (2016)
- No. of blocks: 3
- No. of units: 2,675

Construction
- Constructed: 1991; 35 years ago
- Authority: Hong Kong Housing Authority

Wan Tau Tong Estate (Chinese: 運頭塘邨) is a public housing estate in Tai Po, New Territories, Hong Kong. It is the second last public housing estate in Tai Po, but it is not built on the reclaimed land. The estate consists of 3 residential buildings completed in 1991. Some of the flats were sold to tenants through Phase 1 of the Tenants Purchase Scheme in 1998.

Yat Nga Court (逸雅苑), Tak Nga Court (德雅苑) and King Nga Court (景雅苑) are Home Ownership Scheme housing courts in Tai Po near Wan Tau Tong Estate, built between 1991 and 1992.

== Houses ==
=== Wan Tau Tong Estate ===
Name	Chinese name	Building type	Completed
Wan Hang House	運亨樓	Trident - 3	1991
Wan Lam House	運臨樓	Trident - 3	1991
Wan Loi House	運來樓	Trident - 3	1991

=== Yat Nga Court ===
Name	Chinese name	Building type	Completed
Yat Wing House	逸榮閣	Trident 4	1991
Yat Yan House	逸欣閣	Trident 4	1991

=== Tak Nga Court ===
Name	Chinese name	Building type	Completed
Tak Nga Court	德雅苑	Trident 3	1992

=== King Nga Court ===
Name	Chinese name	Building type	Completed
King Yan House	景欣閣	NCB (Ver.1984)	1992
King Yuet House	景悅閣	NCB (Ver.1984)	1992

== Demographics ==
According to the 2016 by-census, Wan Tau Tong Estate had a population of 7,277 while Yat Nga Court had a population of 3,583. Altogether the population amounts to 10,860.

== Politics ==
Wan Tau Tong Estate, Yat Nga Court, Tak Nga Court and King Nga Court are located in Wan Tau Tong constituency of the Tai Po District Council. It is currently represented by Wong Siu-kin, who was elected in the 2019 elections.

== See also ==
- Public housing estates in Tai Po
