= Elegance Garden =

Public housing estate in Tai Po, Hong Kong

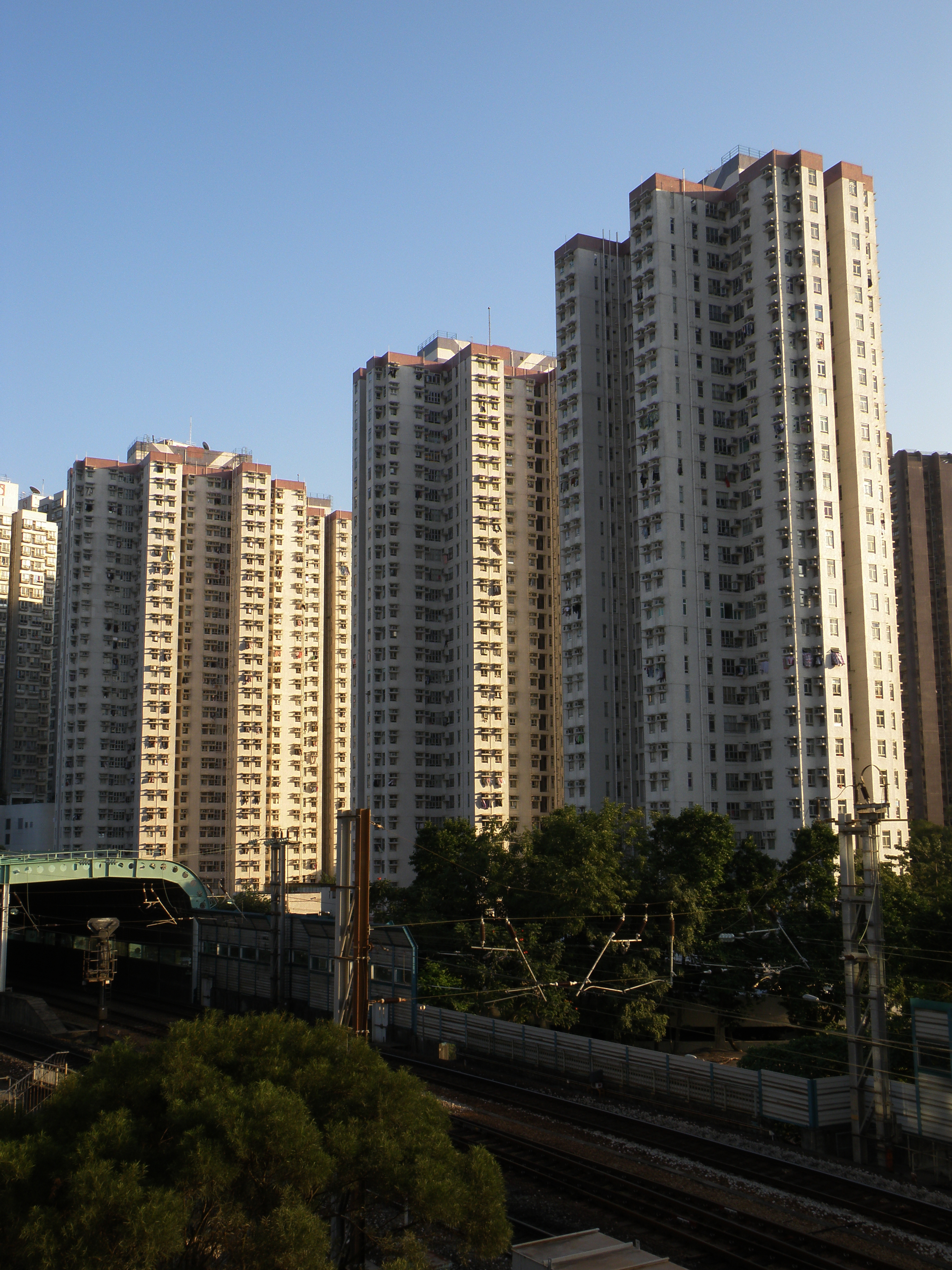
- Elegance Garden
- Interactive map of Elegance Garden

General information
- Location: 1-7 Nam Wan Road, Tai Po; New Territories, Hong Kong
- Coordinates: 22.4443591°N 114.1675828°E
- Status: Completed
- Category: Home Ownership Scheme
- Population: 3,175 (2016)
- No. of blocks: 4
- No. of units: 1,060

Construction
- Constructed: 1990; 36 years ago
- Authority: Hong Kong Housing Authority

Elegance Garden (Chinese: 富雅花園) is a Home Ownership Scheme and Private Sector Participation Scheme court in Tai Po, New Territories, Hong Kong near Uptown Plaza, Wan Tau Tong Estate and MTR Tai Po Market station. It was jointly developed by the Hong Kong Housing Authority and Chevalier Group and has a total of four residential blocks built in 1990.

== Houses ==
Name	Chinese name	Building type	Completed
Block 1	第1座	Private Sector Participation Scheme	1990
Block 2	第2座	Private Sector Participation Scheme	1990
Block 3	第3座	Private Sector Participation Scheme	1990
Block 4	第4座	Private Sector Participation Scheme	1990

== Demographics ==
According to the 2016 by-census, Elegance Garden had a population of 3,175. The median age was 45.6 and the majority of residents (92 per cent) were of Chinese ethnicity. The average household size was 3.2 people. The median monthly household income of all households (i.e. including both economically active and inactive households) was HK$36,060.

== Politics ==
Elegance Garden is located in San Fu constituency of the Tai Po District Council. It was formerly represented by Max Wu Yiu-cheong, who was elected in the 2019 elections until May 2021.

== See also ==
- Public housing estates in Tai Po
