= Yee Fu (constituency) =

- Elected constituency for the Tai Po District Council
- Boundary of Yee Fu in Tai Po District
- District: Tai Po
- Legislative Council constituency: New Territories North East
- Population: 14,644 (2019)
- Electorate: 12,129 (2019)

Current constituency
- Created: 1994
- Number of members: One
- Member: Vacant

Yee Fu is one of the 19 constituencies in the Tai Po District.

The constituency returns one district councillor to the Tai Po District Council, with an election every four years. The seat was currently held by Yam Kai-bong of the Neo Democrats.

Yee Fu constituency is loosely based on Yee Nga Court and most part of Fu Shin Estate in Tai Po with estimated population of 14,644.

== Councillors represented ==
Election	Member	Party
1994	Chan Ping	LDF→DAB
1999	Chan Ping	DAB→Nonpartisan
2003	Yam Kai-bong→Vacant	Democratic
2007	Yam Kai-bong→Vacant	Democratic→Neo Democrats
2011	Yam Kai-bong→Vacant	Neo Democrats
2015	Yam Kai-bong→Vacant	Neo Democrats
2019	Yam Kai-bong→Vacant	Neo Democrats→Independent

== Election results ==
=== 2010s ===
Tai Po District Council Election, 2019: Yee Fu
Party	Candidate	Votes	%	±%
Neo Democrats	Yam Kai-bong	6,028	70.86	−1.24
Independent	Lo Chi-ping	2,479	29.14	
Majority		3,549	41.72	
Turnout		8,525	70.36	
Neo Democrats hold		Swing		

Tai Po District Council Election, 2015: Yee Fu
Party	Candidate	Votes	%	±%
Neo Democrats	Yam Kai-bong	4,148	72.1	+6.1
DAB	Cheung Fung-yin	1,607	27.9	–6.1
Majority		2,541	44.2	+12.2
Turnout		5,783	49.6	
Neo Democrats hold		Swing	+6.1	

Tai Po District Council Election, 2011: Yee Fu
Party	Candidate	Votes	%	±%
Neo Democrats	Yam Kai-bong	3,864	66.0	+12.9
DAB	Clement Woo Kin-man	1,992	34.0	–12.9
Majority		1,872	32.0	+25.8
Neo Democrats hold		Swing	+12.9	

=== 2000s ===
Tai Po District Council Election, 2007: Yee Fu
Party	Candidate	Votes	%	±%
Democratic	Yam Kai-bong	2,837	53.1	–9.4
DAB	Raymond Mo Wai-man	2,509	46.9	
Majority		328	6.2	–18.8
Democratic hold		Swing		

Tai Po District Council Election, 2003: Yee Fu
Party	Candidate	Votes	%	±%
Democratic	Yam Kai-bong	3,176	62.5	
Nonpartisan	Chan Ping	1,904	37.5	–13.1
Majority		1,272	25.0	+22.6
Democratic gain from Nonpartisan		Swing		

=== 1990s ===
Tai Po District Council Election, 1999: Yee Fu
Party	Candidate	Votes	%	±%
Nonpartisan	Chan Ping	1,448	50.6	–3.9
Liberal	Cheng Chee-kwok	1,380	48.2	+40.5
Majority		68	2.4	–15.6
Nonpartisan hold		Swing		

Tai Po District Board Election, 1994: Yee Fu
Party	Candidate	Votes	%	±%
LDF	Chan Ping	1,766	54.5	
Democratic	Chau Wing-tat	1,184	36.5	
Liberal	Yeung Yui-shu	251	7.7	
Majority		582	18.0	
LDF win (new seat)				
