= Yam Kai-bong =

Hong Kong politician

- 任啟邦
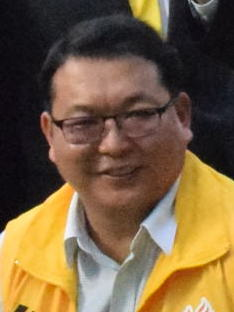
- Yam Kai-bong in 2015

Member of the Tai Po District Council
- In office 1 January 2004 – 8 July 2021
- Preceded by: Chan Ping
- Constituency: Yee Fu

Personal details
- Born: 20 May 1978 (age 48) Hong Kong
- Party: Democratic Party (until 2010); Neo Democrats (since 2010)
- Education: City University of Hong Kong; University of Hull
- Occupation: District Councillor

Yam Kai-bong (Chinese: 任啟邦; born 20 May 1978) is a Hong Kong politician. He is the former member of the Tai Po District Council for Yee Fu and the convenor of the Neo Democrats.

== Biography ==
He was graduated from the City University of Hong Kong before he ran in the 1999 District Council election in Tai Yuen in as the youngest candidate in the election for the Democratic Party, where he lost to veteran Cheng Chun-ping. He went to study abroad at the University of Hull in Social Policy.

In the 2003 District Council election, he ran again in Yee Fu and won a seat in the Tai Po District Council. He was re-elected in 2007, 2011 and 2015. He ran in the 2008 Legislative Council election in New Territories East on Andrew Cheng's ticket in which Cheng successfully retook his seat.

He was considered as the reformist faction in the Democratic Party. In the 2008 party leadership election, Yam ran for the central committee with other reformist faction headed by Andrew Cheng who challenged the vice-chairman post. The reformist ticket was largely defeated with Yam being the only reformist elected.

In the 2012 constitutional reform package in which the Democratic Party made a compromise with the Beijing authorities, Yam quit the party with other reformists including Gary Fan and formed the Neo Democrats in which he became one of its convenor. In the 2012 Legislative Council election, he ran on Gary Fan's nine-man ticket in New Territories East, on the second place, and successfully gained a seat for the Neo Democrats with around 28,000 votes.

In the 2015 District Council election, he received the highest votes in the election, taking 4,148 votes in total. He was on Gary Fan's ticket in the 2016 Legislative Council election again. Despite an increase in the number of votes, Fan failed to win the re-election.

Political offices
Preceded by Chan Ping	Member of Tai Po District Council; Representative for Yee Fu; 2004–2021	Vacant
