= Spotted mandarin =

Spotted mandarin may refer to:

- Synchiropus picturatus, a colorful fish used in the aquarium trade
- Prosartes maculata, a wildflower of the genus Prosartes
