= Robert Elegant =

American-British writer (1928–2023)

- Born: Robert Sampson Elegant; 7 March 1928; New York City, U.S.
- Died: 20 June 2023 (aged 95); London, England
- Education: University of Pennsylvania (AB); Columbia University (MA, MS); Yale University
- Occupation: Journalist

Robert Sampson Elegant (7 March 1928 – 20 June 2023) was an American-British author and journalist. He spent many years in Asia as a journalist. The Asian settings of all but one of his novels reflect that experience. He covered both the Korean and the Vietnam Wars, as well as four or five lesser conflicts. One of his last novels, Cry Peace, is centered on the Korean War.

== Career ==
Elegant held degrees from the University of Pennsylvania (AB, Phi Beta Kappa); and Columbia University (MA, Far Eastern studies, MS journalism, Distinguished Alumnus Award), as well as a diploma of proficiency in Chinese from Yale University. He was a Pulitzer Prize traveling fellow (1951) and received an Edgar Allan Poe Special Award in 1967 for A Kind of Treason, among the best first mystery thriller novels of the preceding year.

Among other awards, he received four prizes for best interpretation of foreign news by the Overseas Press Club of America. He was shortlisted for a Pulitzer Prize in international reporting three times, a finalist twice. He was a visiting professor at the University of South Carolina and Boston University.

Elegant was a fellow of the Washington, D.C. American Enterprise Institute, the Berlin, Germany, Wissenschaftskolleg, Institute for Advanced Studies, and the Fairbank Center for Chinese Studies at Harvard University.

Elegant briefed Richard Nixon and Henry Kissinger repeatedly on Asia in general, as well as China and Vietnam in particular. He was proud of a handwritten note from the former president whose undeniably momentous masterstroke in foreign affairs was reopening contact with mainland China. That note reads: "Dear Robert, You are my favorite China expert. Richard Nixon"

A patron of the Manchu Shih Tzu Society of Great Britain, he raised Shih-tzu (Chinese lion) dogs and was a devoted amateur sailor and owner of small craft for 50 years.

Elegant later lived in London and Italy. He frequently traveled, mainly to the Far East. He spoke, read, and wrote Chinese and Japanese, having studied both the classical and modern languages, as well as German, Italian, and some Indonesian.

His articles were published in hundreds of newspapers and scores of weekly, biweekly, and monthly journals across the world, and his books were published in a number of languages in 20 countries.

== Personal life and death ==
On 16 April 1956, Elegant married painter Moira Clarissa Brady. They have two children, Victoria and Simon, and five grandchildren. Brady died of cancer on 19 January 1999.

On 10 May 2003, Elegant married author and editor Ursula Rosemary Righter (née Douglas).

Elegant died at home in London on 20 June 2023, at the age of 95.

== Bibliography ==
=== Nonfiction ===
- Elegant, Robert S. (1951). China's red masters : political biographies of the Chinese Communist leaders. Twayne.
- The Dragon's Seed, St. Martin's (1959)
- The Center of the World, Doubleday (1964) (revised edition by Funk in 1968)
- Mao's Great Revolution, World Publishing (1971)
- China's Red Masters: Political Biographies of the Chinese Communist Leaders, Greenwood Press (1971) (First reprint)
- Mao vs. Chiang: The Battle for China, Grosset & Dunlap (1972)
- The Great Cities: Hong Kong, Time-Life (1977)
- Pacific Destiny: Inside Asia Today, Crown (1990)
- Elegant, Robert (May 1996). "People's China : the third epoch". China. Quadrant. 40 (5): 19–25.

=== Fiction ===
- A Kind of Treason, Holt (1966)
- The Seeking, Funk (1969)
- Dynasty, McGraw (1976)
- Manchu, McGraw (1979)
- Mandarin, Simon & Schuster (1983)
- White Sun, Red Star, Hamish Hamilton (1986) (published as From a Far Land by Random House in 1987)
- Bianca, Sinclair-Stevenson (1992) (St Martin's also published it in 1995)
- The Everlasting Sorrow, Reed International (1994)
- Last Year in Hong Kong: A Love Story, Morrow (1997)
- The Big Brown Bears, Hale (1998)
- Cry Peace, Hale (2005)

== Sources ==
- "Robert (Sampson) Elegant," Contemporary Authors Online, entry updated 4 April 2001.
