= Mandarin (Elegant novel) =

Historical novel by Robert Elegant (1983)

Mandarin is a Robert Elegant historical novel published by Simon & Schuster in 1983. It is set in China during the Taiping Rebellion. It is the third to appear of Elegant's "Imperial China Trilogy", the first being Dynasty (New York: McGraw-Hill, 1977) and the second being Manchu (New York: McGraw-Hill, 1980).

Kirkus Reviews called it "Another Elegant Sino-spectacular" in which "against a vast, cheerfully over-simplified wash of mid-19th-century Chinese history, fictional families (plus a few real-life movers and shakers) launch or muddle through Great Events." The review continues, "Intricate shuttlecock diplomacy, ceremonial/battle action, family saga/romance--all polished to an entertaining high gloss: a virtuoso pop-panorama, with fresh angles even if you've already read a dozen other China-history novels".

The historian Gary Olsen in a discussion of the advantages and drawbacks of historical fiction in teaching history, defends Elegant's novels of China. "In Mandarin," he comments,"Robert Elegant manages to concentrate, in a few telling and engaging characters, the human drama of China during the last fifty years of the past century." His novels, including Dynasty and Manchu, fall into the category of historical novel that "admits imagination and embellishment, but is never overwhelmed by them. In these works, history remains the dominant partner. Major historical figures do not suffer the indignity of having their names changed and their actions altered; fictional characters play clearly subordinated roles; history is faithfully related."

== Plot ==
Set during the Taiping Rebellion, the plot sets the rebels against the ruling Manchu dynasty. Yehenala who would become the Dowager Empress, is one of many to be a concubine of the Xianfeng Emperor (in the novel written "Hsien Feng"). She gives birth to a son and during the Second Opium War flees with the Emperor when the foreign troops invade and loot Beijing. She deals both with foreign diplomacy and court politics.

The novel weaves in the story of a Shanghai merchant (Saul Haleevie) and his partner (Aisek Lee). Yehenala asks the Emperor to pardon Alsek from execution; his crime was allowing his mentally disturbed mother to kill herself. Saul has a wife (Sarah) and a daughter (Fronah). He adopts Aisek's sons David and Aaron. David becomes an aide to the high official Li Hongzhang (spelled in the novel "Li Hung-Chang"). but Aaron allies with the rebels. Fronah carries on an affair with an Englishman but marries banker Lionel Henriques. After they have a son, Lionel becomes addicted to opium. He loves young girls and the rebellion. The emperor dies, the family travels through China, and the rebels are destroyed. Fronah finds love with the American Gabriel Hyde.

== Characters ==
- Saul Haleevie - an Orthodox rabbi and Shanghai silk merchant.
- Sarah - Saul's worrisome wife.
- Fronah - Saul and Sarah's daughter.
- Aisek Lee - a Chinese silk merchant and partner of Saul Haleevie born into Judaism. He becomes imprisoned and Saul, Aaron, and David try to bribe government officials to get him out of prison.
- Aaron - Aisek's son.
- David - Aisek's son.
- Lionel - Fronah's first husband, who becomes an opium addict and dies.
- Gabriel Hyde - Fronah's second husband, who has a Jewish mother.
- Yehenala - based on Cixi, who became the Empress Dowager. Ambitious, clever, and beautiful concubine who manipulates the corrupt emperor into having his first child by her.
