= Fu Ming Sun (constituency) =

- Elected constituency for the Tai Po District Council
- Boundary of Fu Ming Sun in Tai Po District
- District: Tai Po
- Legislative Council constituency: New Territories North East
- Population: 13,600 (2019)
- Electorate: 9,381 (2019)

Current constituency
- Created: 1994
- Number of members: One
- Member: Vacant

Fu Ming Sun (Chinese: 富明新) is one of the 19 constituencies in the Tai Po District of Hong Kong.

The constituency returns one district councillor to the Tai Po District Council, with an election every four years.

Fu Ming Sun constituency has an estimated population of 13,600.

== Councillors represented ==
Election	Member	Party
1994	Cheng Chi-kwok	Liberal
1999	Kwan Wing-yip→Vacant	Democratic
2003	Kwan Wing-yip→Vacant	Democratic
2007	Kwan Wing-yip→Vacant	Democratic→Neo Democrats
2011	Kwan Wing-yip→Vacant	Neo Democrats
2015	Kwan Wing-yip→Vacant	Neo Democrats
2019	Kwan Wing-yip→Vacant	Neo Democrats→Independent

== Election results ==
=== 2010s ===
Tai Po District Council Election, 2019: Fu Ming Sun
Party	Candidate	Votes	%	±%
Neo Democrats	Kwan Wing-yip	4,670	70.42	
FTU	Ng Cheuk-wing	1,962	29.58	
Majority		2,708	40.04	
Turnout		6,658	71.00	
Neo Democrats hold		Swing		
