= Mandrin (medical equipment) =

Medical metal guide for flexible catheters

A mandrin is a metal guide for flexible catheters. It is a stiff wire or stylet inserted into the soft catheter and gives it shape and firmness while passing through a hollow tubular structure. It is sometimes called a mandrel, although mandrel may refer to other types of instruments as well.

== Mandrins in gastric tubes (guide wire) ==
Particularly soft material is used for long gastric or feeding tubes to prevent pressure necrosis and ulceration of the esophageal wall. If such soft tubes are advanced through the nose towards the stomach, they need an internal splint to prevent them from kinking, rolling up or even knotting halfway. Such “guide wires” usually consist of hollow metal spirals that allow the correct position to be checked by aspiration of gastric juice before the stylet is removed.
