= Chung Ting (constituency) =

Constituency in the Tai Po District, Hong Kong

- Elected constituency for the Tai Po District Council
- Boundary of Chung Ting in Tai Po District
- District: Tai Po
- Legislative Council constituency: New Territories North East
- Population: 14,303 (2019)
- Electorate: 9,426 (2019)

Current constituency
- Created: 1994
- Number of members: One
- Member: Vacant

Chung Ting is one of the 19 constituencies in the Tai Po District. The constituency returns one district councillor to the Tai Po District Council, with an election every four years. The seat was currently held by Eric Tam Wing-fun of the Business and Professionals Alliance for Hong Kong.

Chung Ting constituency is loosely based on private apartments including Fortune Plaza, Jade Plaza, Eightland Gardens in Tai Po with estimated population of 14,303.

== Councillors represented ==
Election	Member	Party
1994	Leung Wo-ping	Nonpartisan
199?	Leung Wo-ping	Progressive Alliance
2003	Wong Tin-lung	DDN
2007	Eric Tam Wing-fun	DAB
2019	Man Nim-chi→Vacant	Community Alliance

== Election results ==
=== 2010s ===
Tai Po District Council Election, 2019: Chung Ting
Party	Candidate	Votes	%	±%
Community Alliance	Man Nim-chi	4,454	64.02	
DAB	Eric Tam Wing-fun	2,503	35.98	−14.98
Majority		1,951	28.04	
Turnout		6,970	73.97	
Community Alliance hold		Swing		

Tai Po District Council Election, 2015: Chung Ting
Party	Candidate	Votes	%	±%
DAB	Eric Tam Wing-fun	1,881	50.96	
Democratic	Lui Nok	1,810	49.04	
Majority		71	1.92	
Turnout		3,691	41.93	
DAB hold		Swing		

Tai Po District Council Election, 2011: Chung Ting
Party	Candidate	Votes	%	±%
DAB	Eric Tam Wing-fun	uncontested		
DAB hold		Swing		

=== 2000s ===
Tai Po District Council Election, 2007: Chung Ting
Party	Candidate	Votes	%	±%
DAB	Eric Tam Wing-fun	1,703	50.78	
Democratic	Irene Lee Woon-yung	1,510	45.02	
Liberal	Choi Kam-kong	141	4.20	
Majority		193	5.76	
DAB gain from Nonpartisan		Swing		

Tai Po District Council Election, 2003: Chung Ting
Party	Candidate	Votes	%	±%
DDN	Wong Tin-lung	1,424	56.55	
HKPA	Leung Wo-ping	1,094	44.45	
Majority		330	12.10	
[[DDN|Hong Kong Democratic Development Network]] gain from HKPA		Swing		

Tai Po District Council Election, 1999: Chung Ting
Party	Candidate	Votes	%	±%
Nonpartisan	Leung Wo-ping	Unopposed		
Nonpartisan hold		Swing		

Tai Po District Board Election, 1994: Chung Ting
Party	Candidate	Votes	%	±%
TPRA	Leung Wo-ping	1,118	77.26	
Liberal	Liu Heung-lan	329	22.74	
Majority		789	54.52	
[[TPRA|Tai Po Residents' Association]] win (new seat)				
