= Tenants Purchase Scheme =

Housing scheme in Hong Kong

- Traditional Chinese: 租者置其屋計劃
- Simplified Chinese: 租者置其屋计划
Transcriptions
Standard Mandarin
- Hanyu Pinyin: Zū Zhě Zhì Qí Wū Jìhuà
Yue: Cantonese
- Yale Romanization: Jōu jé ji kèih ngūk gai waahk
- Jyutping: Zou1 ze2 zi3 kei4 nguk1 gai3 waak6

Tenants Purchase Scheme (TPS) is a scheme which allows tenants in public housing estates under the Hong Kong Housing Authority to purchase their flats. The price is set to be much lower than the market prices of private flats and Home Ownership Scheme (HOS) owing to the age of flats and restriction on selling.

== History ==
The Scheme was announced in 1997 and formally launched a year later. It provided an opportunity for at least 250,000 public housing tenants to acquire their flats at affordable prices over a ten-year period with the ultimate aim of achieving 70% home ownership by 2007.

In November 2002, in response to a weak property market which was allegedly being distorted by public housing sales schemes, it was decided to terminate the TPS after the sale of the five estates under Phase 6B. The suspension of the HOS was announced at the same time.

In June 2004, phase 6A was announced for a total of about 25,000 units: the authority would sell 5,100 flats in Cheung Wah Estate in Fanling in June; flats in Lei Tung Estate, Po Lam Estate and Shan King Estate will be sold in stages by the end of 2004.

In May 2005, the Government announced the estates which would be in 6B, the final phase of the Tenants Purchase Scheme. 23,451 flats under the Housing Authority, comprising Cheung Fat Estate in Tsing Yi, Fu Shin Estate in Tai Po, Long Ping Estate in Yuen Long, Nam Cheong Estate in Sham Shui Po, and Tsui Lam Estate in Tseung Kwan O would be set for sale by the end of 2006.

== See also ==
- Right to Buy Scheme, similar public housing scheme in Great Britain
