= Public housing estates in Chai Wan and Siu Sai Wan =

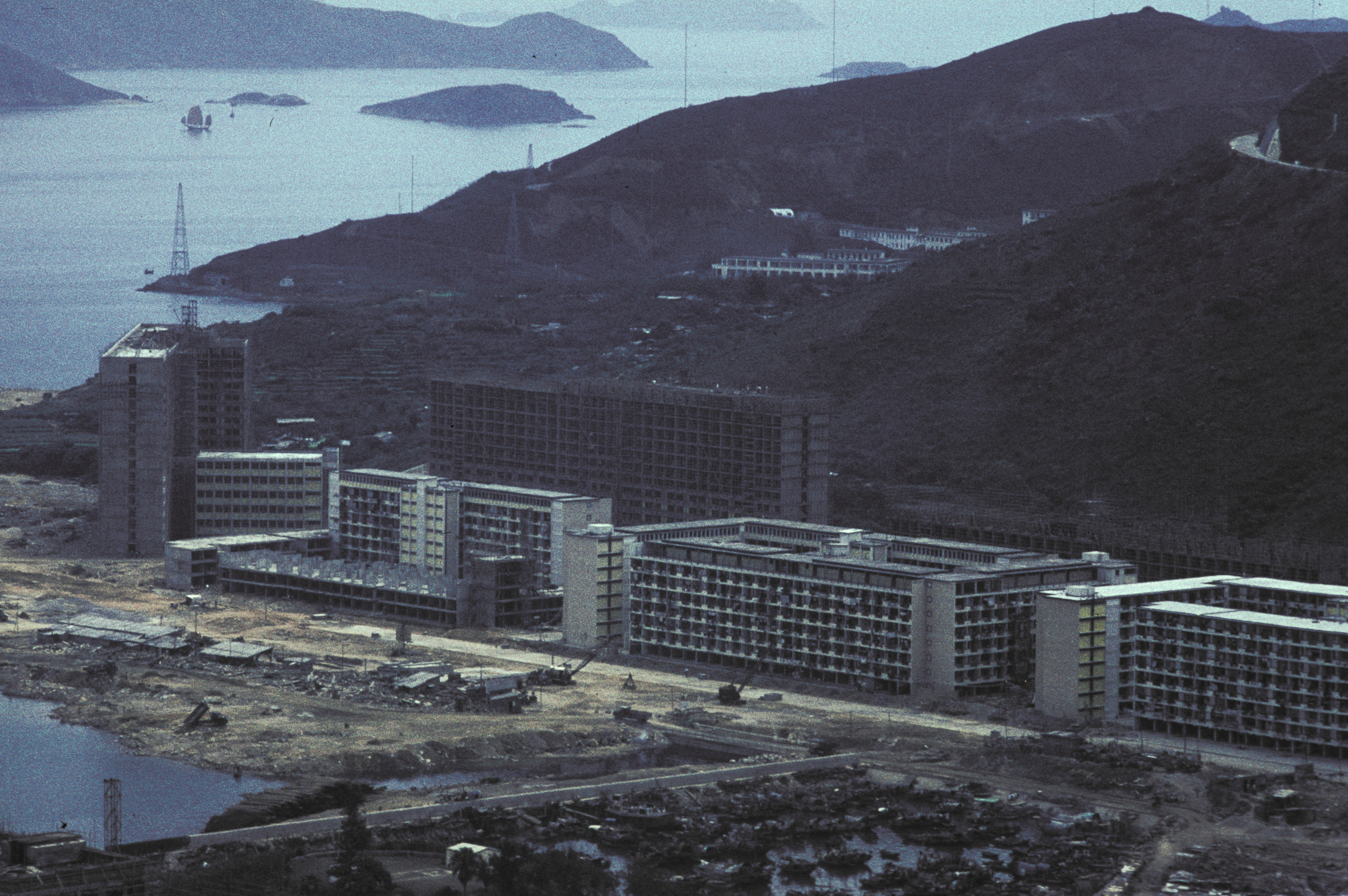
The former Chai Wan Estate under construction in 1965.

The following is a list of public housing estates in Chai Wan and Siu Sai Wan, Hong Kong, including Home Ownership Scheme (HOS), Private Sector Participation Scheme (PSPS), Sandwich Class Housing Scheme (SCHS), Flat-for-Sale Scheme (FFSS), and Tenants Purchase Scheme (TPS) estates.

== Overview ==
Name		Type	Inaug.	No Blocks	No Units	Notes
Cheerful Garden	富怡花園	PSPS	1995	5	1,870	
Dip Tsui Court	蝶翠苑	GFSHOS	2022 (Expected)	1	828	
Fullview Garden	富景花園	PSPS	1993	11	3,240	
Fung Wah Estate	峰華邨	TPS	1991	2	463	
Greenwood Terrace	康翠臺	PSPS	1985	7	2,100	
Hang Tsui Court	杏翠苑	HOS	1997	2	674	
Harmony Garden	富欣花園	PSPS	1997	8	2,340	
Hing Man Estate	興民邨	Public	1982	3	1,999	
Hing Wah (I) Estate	興華(一)邨	Public	1999	3	2,272	
Hing Wah (II) Estate	興華(二)邨	Public	1976	7	3,579	
Hiu Tsui Court	曉翠苑	HOS	1990	2	660	
Kai Tsui Court	佳翠苑	HOS	1993	2	1216	
King Tsui Court	景翠苑	HOS	1982	1	608	
Lok Hin Terrace	樂軒臺	PSPS	1995	5	1,550	
Neptune Terrace	樂翠臺	PSPS	1986	3	978	
Shan Tsui Court	山翠苑	HOS	1981	4	896	
Siu Sai Wan Estate	小西灣邨	Public	1990	12	6,160	
Tsui Lok Estate	翠樂邨	Public	1999	1	320	
Tsui Wan Estate	翠灣邨	TPS	1988	4	703	
Walton Estate	宏德居	PSPS	1982	4	760	
Wan Tsui Estate	環翠邨	Public	1979	11	3,678	
Yan Tsui Court	茵翠苑	HOS	1983	2	304	
Yee Tsui Court	怡翠苑	HOS	1981	3	600	
Yue Wan Estate	漁灣邨	Public	1977	4	2,179	
Yuet Chui Court	悅翠苑	HOS	1999	1	354	
Chai Wan Estate	柴灣邨	Public	2010	2	1,600	

== Cheerful Garden ==
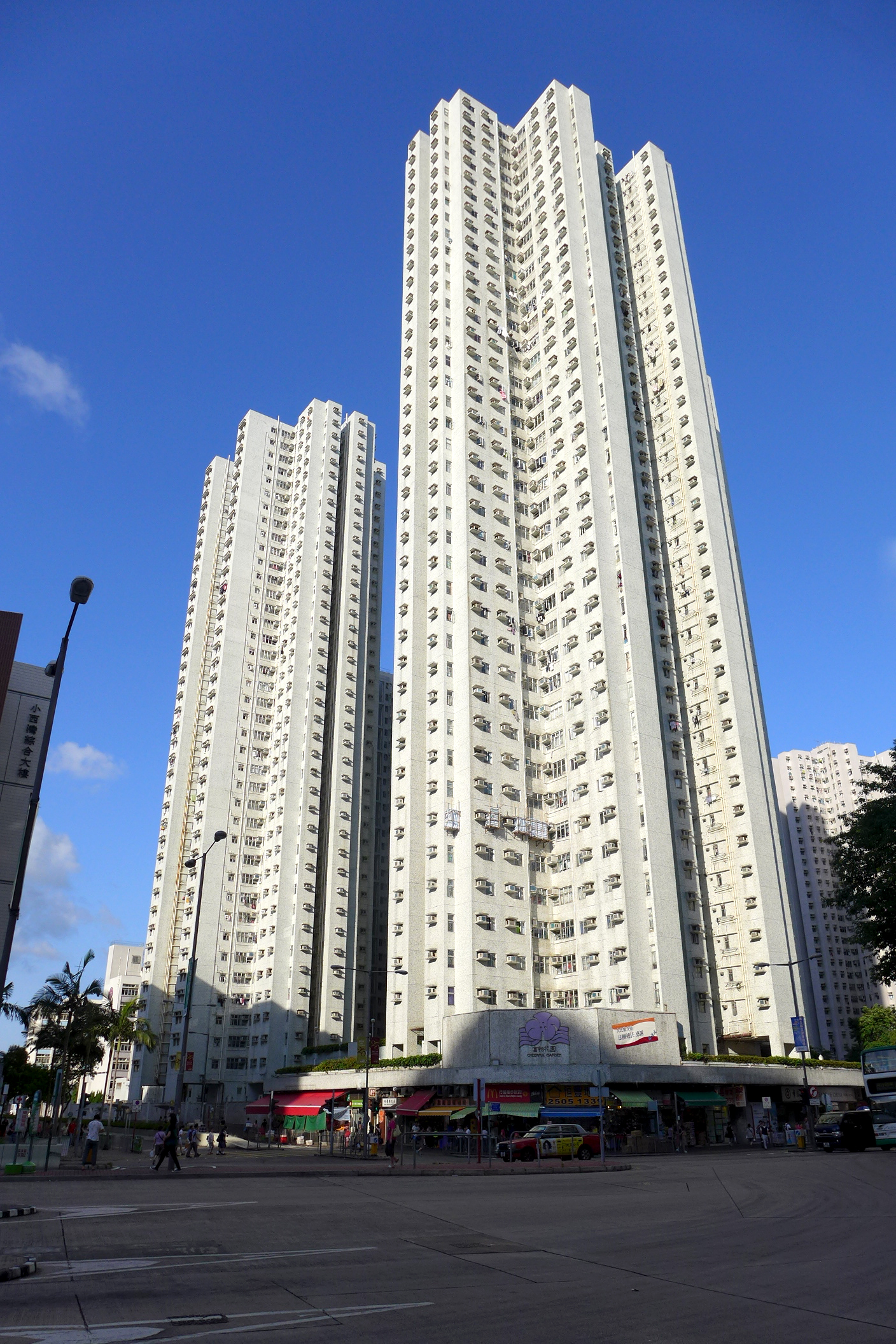
Cheerful Garden

Cheerful Garden (Chinese: 富怡花園) is a Home Ownership Scheme and Private Sector Participation Scheme court on the reclaimed land at the north of Siu Sai Wan Road, Siu Sai Wan. It has 5 blocks built in 1995, jointly developed by the Hong Kong Housing Authority and Chevalier Group.

Cheerful Garden is in Primary One Admission (POA) School Net 16. Within the school net are multiple aided schools (operated independently but funded with government money) and two government schools: Shau Kei Wan Government Primary School and Aldrich Bay Government Primary School.

=== Houses ===
Name	Type	Completion
Block 1	Private Sector Participation Scheme	1995
Block 2	Private Sector Participation Scheme	1995
Block 3	Private Sector Participation Scheme	1995
Block 4	Private Sector Participation Scheme	1995
Block 5	Private Sector Participation Scheme	1995

== Dip Tsui Court ==
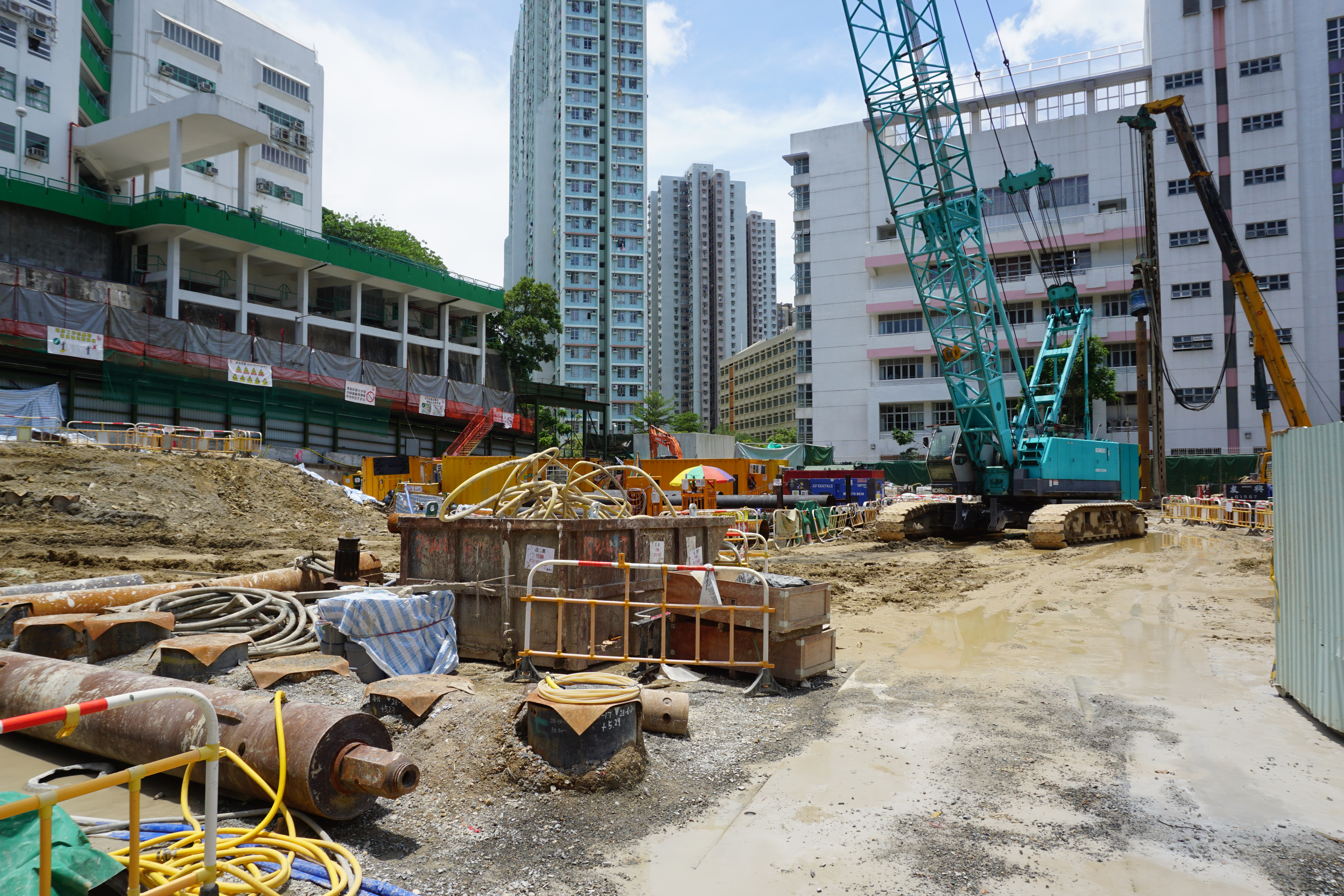
Dip Tsui Court under construction

Dip Tsui Court (Chinese: 蝶翠苑) is a Green Form Subsidised Home Ownership Scheme (GFSHOS) court in Chai Wan Road, Chai Wan and the first GFSHOS court on Hong Kong Island. Formerly the site of Block 13 of the old Chai Wan Estate, the court has 1 block comprising 828 flats with sellable areas of 187 to 320 square feet at prices between HK$980,000 and HK$2.07 million. The estimated material date of Dip Tsui Court will be 31 August 2022. Average selling price is HK$6,100 per square feet, by applying a discount of 51 per cent from the assessed market value. It is expected to commerce in 2022.

=== House ===
Name	Type	Completion
Dip Tsui Court	Non-standard	2022

== Fullview Garden ==
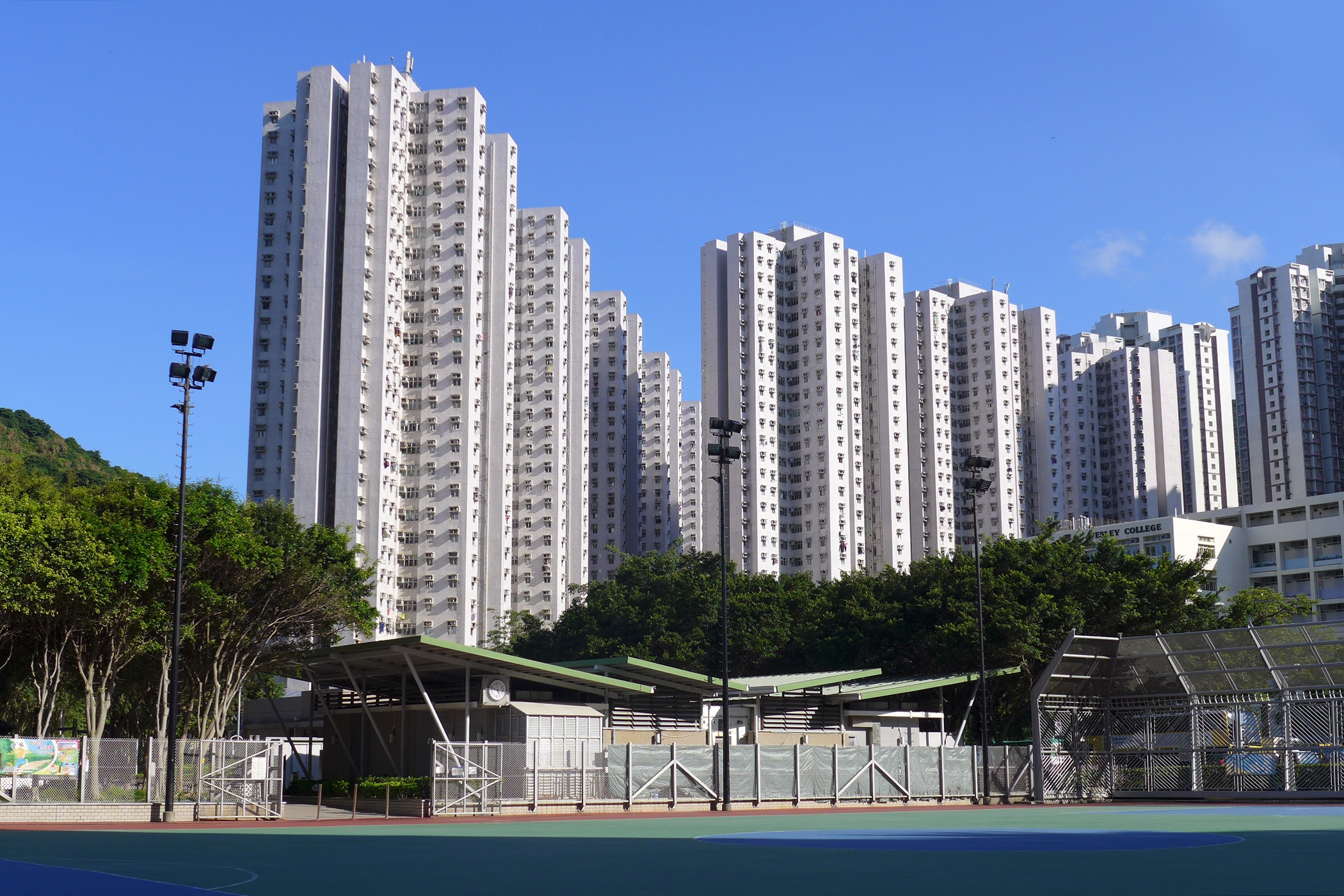
Fullview Garden

Fullview Garden (Chinese: 富景花園) is a Home Ownership Scheme court and Private Sector Participation Scheme court at the south of Siu Sai Wan Road, Siu Sai Wan. Formerly the site of intelligence gathering centre established by British Armed Force until the 1980s, the court has 11 blocks built in 1993 and 1994, jointly developed by the Hong Kong Housing Authority and Chevalier Group.

=== Houses ===
Name	Type	Completion
Block 1	Private Sector Participation Scheme	1993
Block 2	Private Sector Participation Scheme	1993
Block 3	Private Sector Participation Scheme	1993
Block 4	Private Sector Participation Scheme	1993
Block 5	Private Sector Participation Scheme	1993
Block 6	Private Sector Participation Scheme	1993
Block 7	Private Sector Participation Scheme	1994
Block 8	Private Sector Participation Scheme	1994
Block 9	Private Sector Participation Scheme	1994
Block 10	Private Sector Participation Scheme	1994
Block 11	Private Sector Participation Scheme	1994

== Fung Wah Estate and King Tsui Court ==
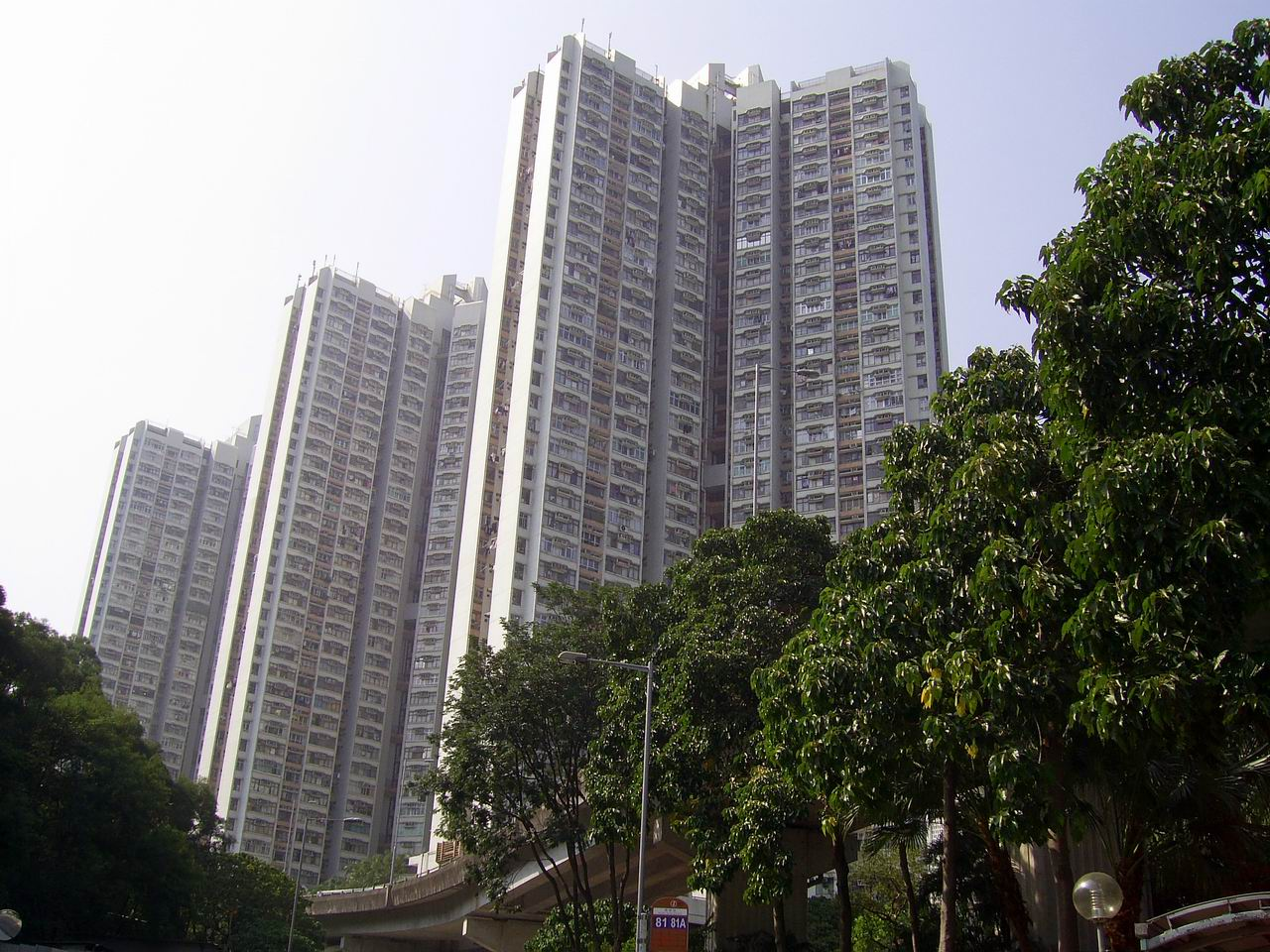
Fung Wah Estate and King Tsui Court (back)

Fung Wah Estate (Chinese: 峰華邨) is a mixed public/TPS estate on a hill in southwest Chai Wan. It consists of 2 residential blocks completed in 1991. Another HOS court, King Tsui Court (Chinese: 景翠苑), is also located in the estate. In 2000, some of the rental flats were sold to tenants through Tenants Purchase Scheme Phase 3.

=== Houses ===
Name	Type	Completion
Hiu Fung House	Trident 4	1991
Sau Fung House	Trident 4	1991

Name	Type	Completion
King Tsui Court	Trident 4	1991

== Greenwood Terrace ==
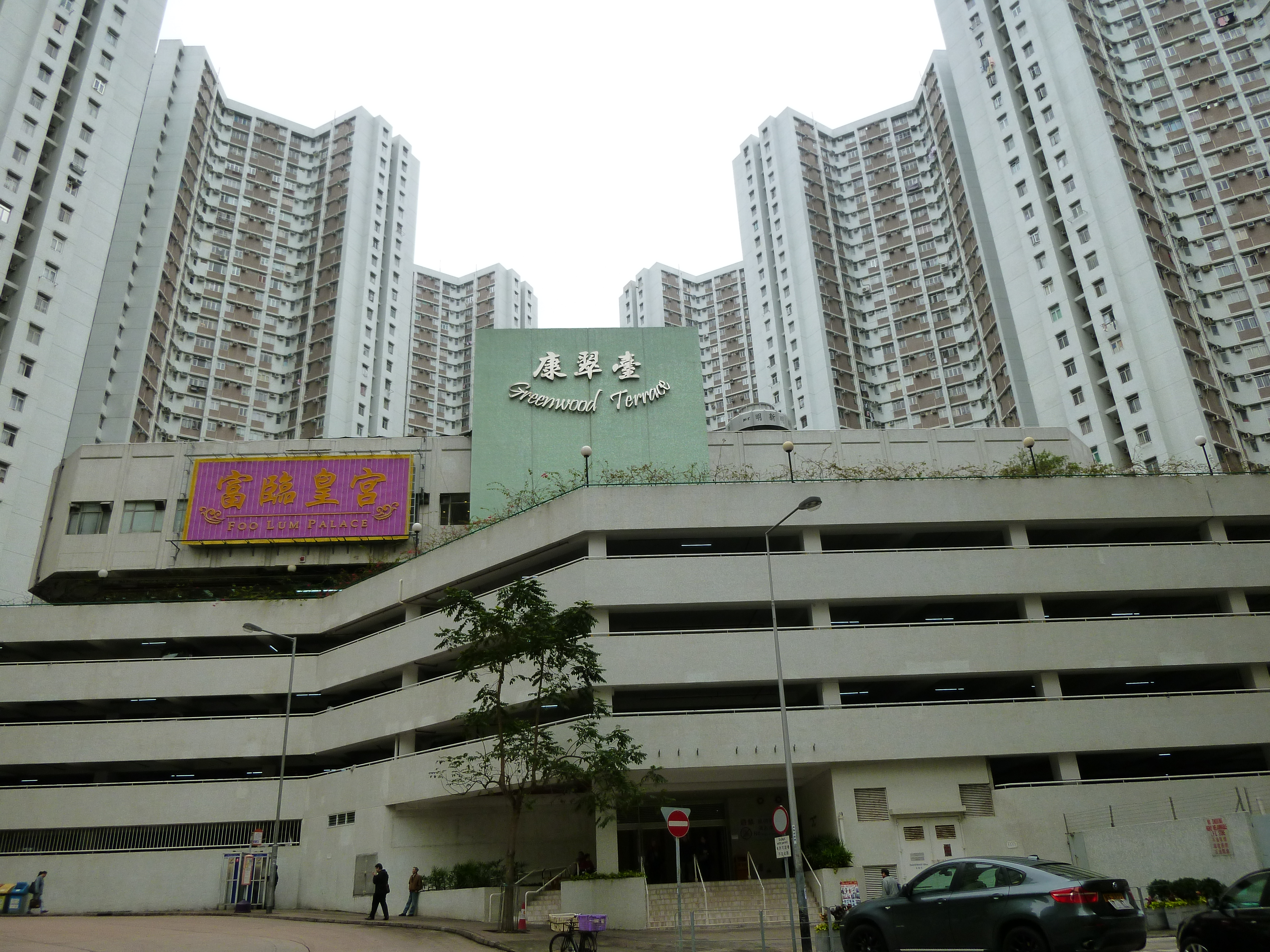
Greenwood Terrace

Greenwood Terrace (Chinese: 康翠臺) is a Home Ownership Scheme and Private Sector Participation Scheme court in Chai Wan, with close proximity to MTR Chai Wan station. It was jointly developed by Hong Kong Housing Authority and New World Development. It consists of 7 residential blocks completed in 1985 and is one of the largest estates in Chai Wan.

=== Houses ===
Name	Type	Completion
Block 1	Private Sector Participation Scheme	1985
Block 2	Private Sector Participation Scheme	1985
Block 3	Private Sector Participation Scheme	1985
Block 4	Private Sector Participation Scheme	1985
Block 5	Private Sector Participation Scheme	1985
Block 6	Private Sector Participation Scheme	1985
Block 7	Private Sector Participation Scheme	1985

== Hang Tsui Court ==
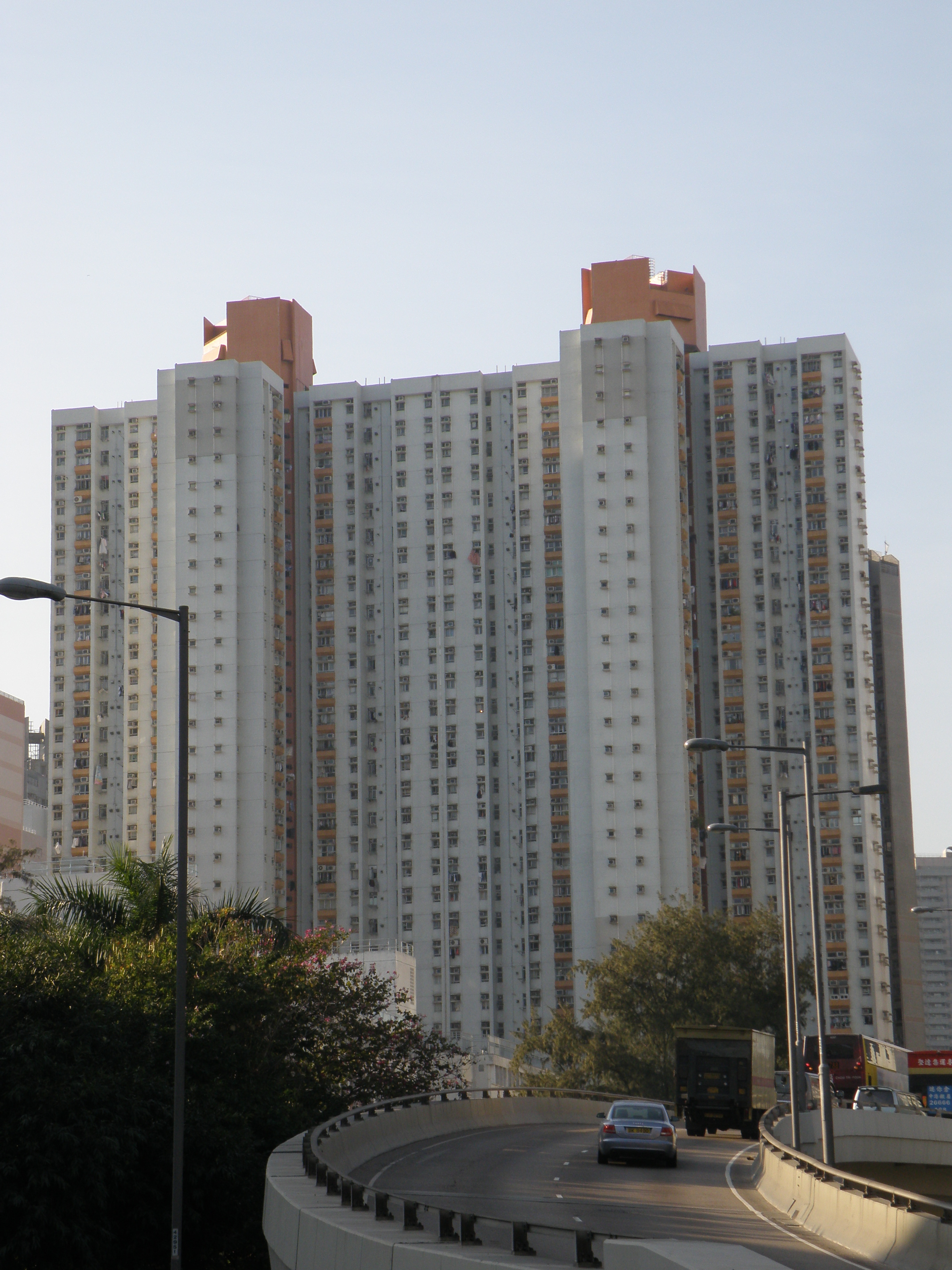
Hang Tsui Court

Hang Tsui Court (Chinese: 杏翠苑) is a Home Ownership Scheme court on the reclaimed land in Chai Wan, near Chai Wan Park, Yue Wan Estate, Tsui Wan Estate and Tsui Lok Estate. It has 2 blocks built in 1997.

=== Houses ===
Name	Type	Completion
Tsui Ching House	NCB (Ver.1984)	1997
Tsui Ying House	NCB (Ver.1984)	1997

== Harmony Garden ==
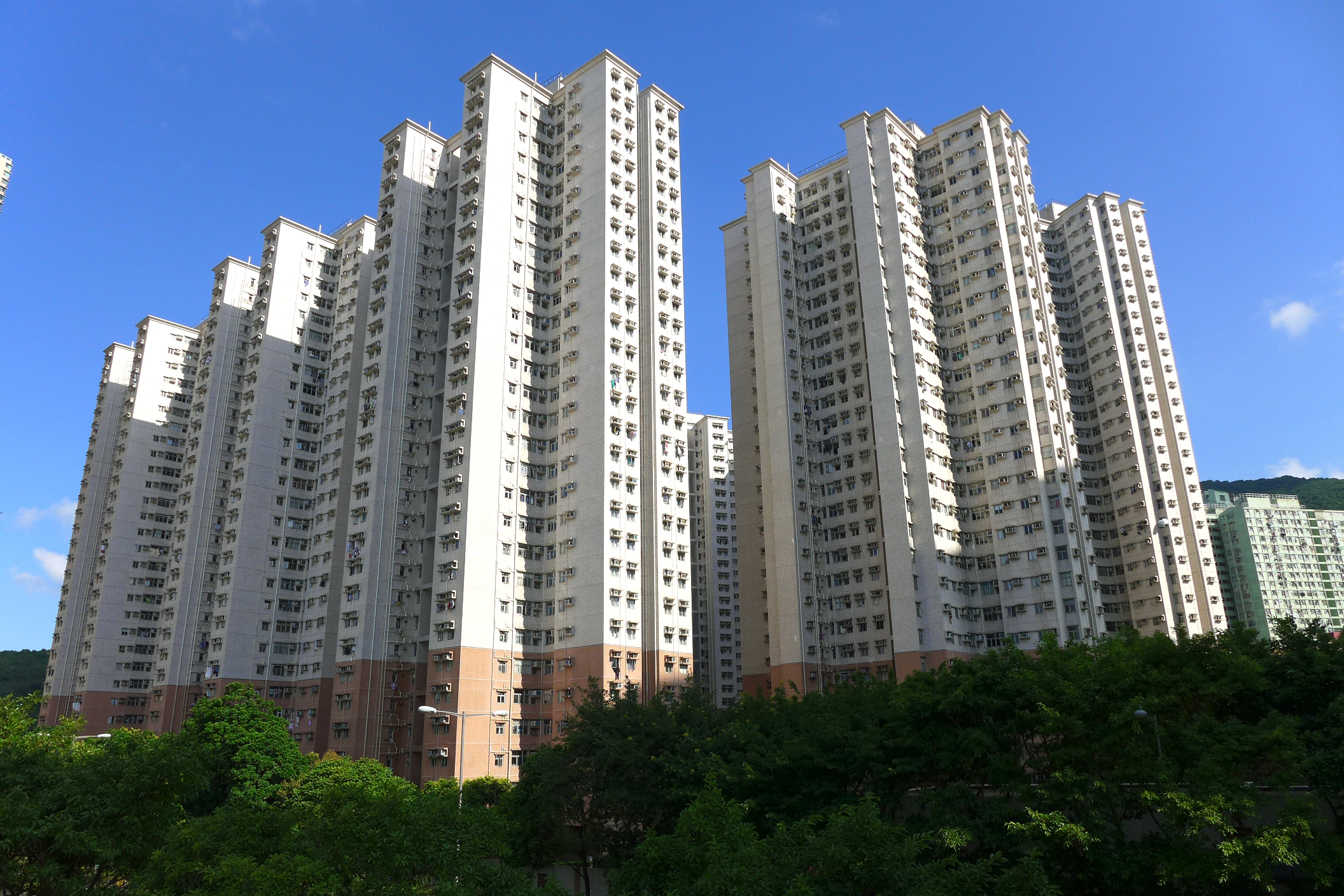
Harmony Garden

Harmony Garden (Chinese: 富欣花園) is a Home Ownership Scheme and Private Sector Participation Scheme court on the reclaimed land along Siu Sai Wan Road, Siu Sai Wan. It has 8 blocks built in 1997, jointly developed by the Hong Kong Housing Authority and Chevalier Group.

=== Houses ===
Name	Type	Completion
Block 1	Private Sector Participation Scheme	1997
Block 2	Private Sector Participation Scheme	1997
Block 3	Private Sector Participation Scheme	1997
Block 4	Private Sector Participation Scheme	1997
Block 5	Private Sector Participation Scheme	1997
Block 6	Private Sector Participation Scheme	1997
Block 7	Private Sector Participation Scheme	1997
Block 8	Private Sector Participation Scheme	1997

== Hing Man Estate ==
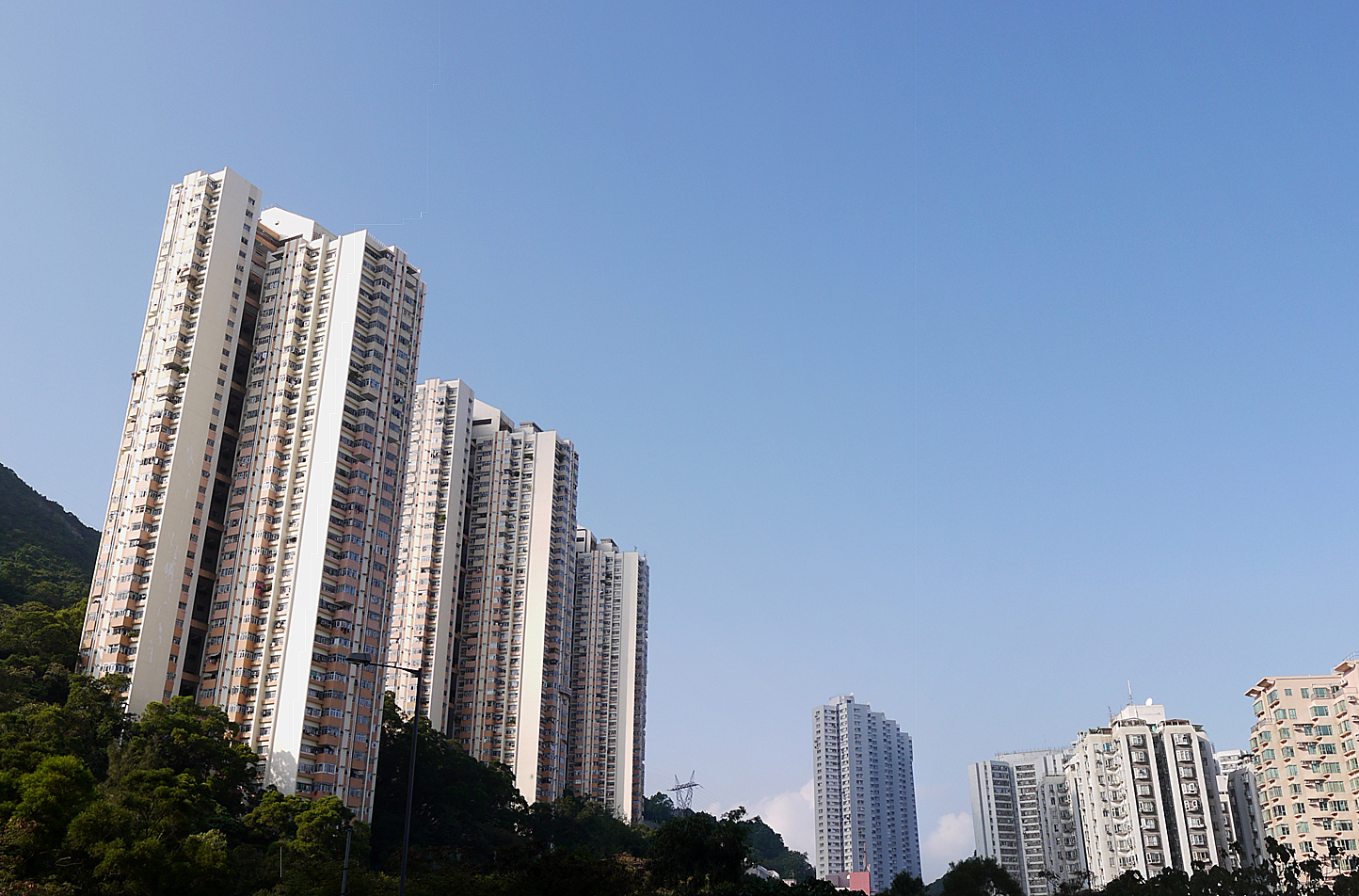
Hing Man Estate

Hing Man Estate (Chinese: 興民邨) is a public housing estate in Chai Wan, located at the north of Hing Wah Estate. It consists of 3 blocks completed in 1982.

[25]

=== Houses ===
Name	Type	Completion
Man Chak House	Cross	1982
Man Fu House	Cross	
Man Yat House	Cross	

== Hing Wah Estate ==
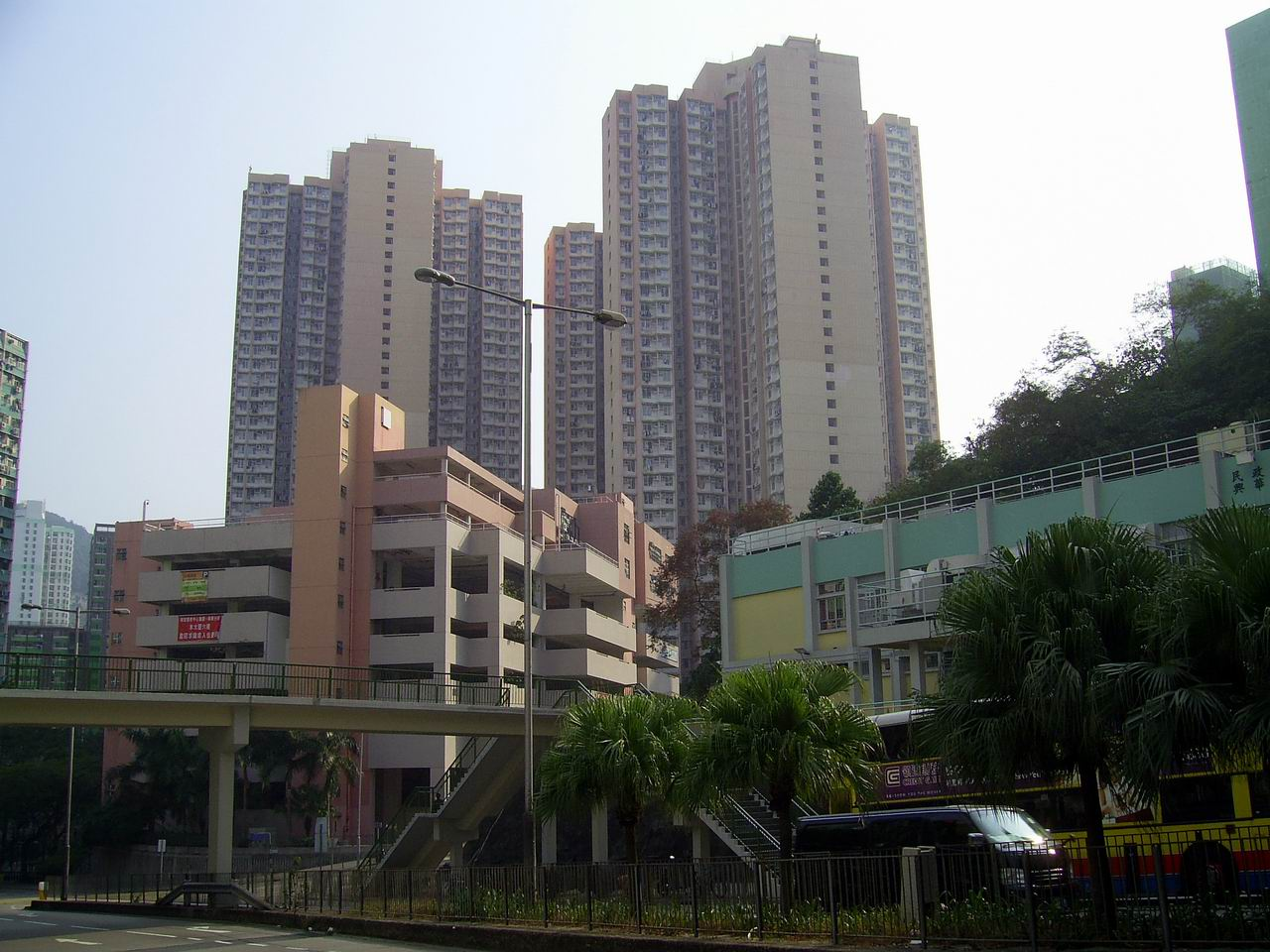
Hing Wah (I) Estate

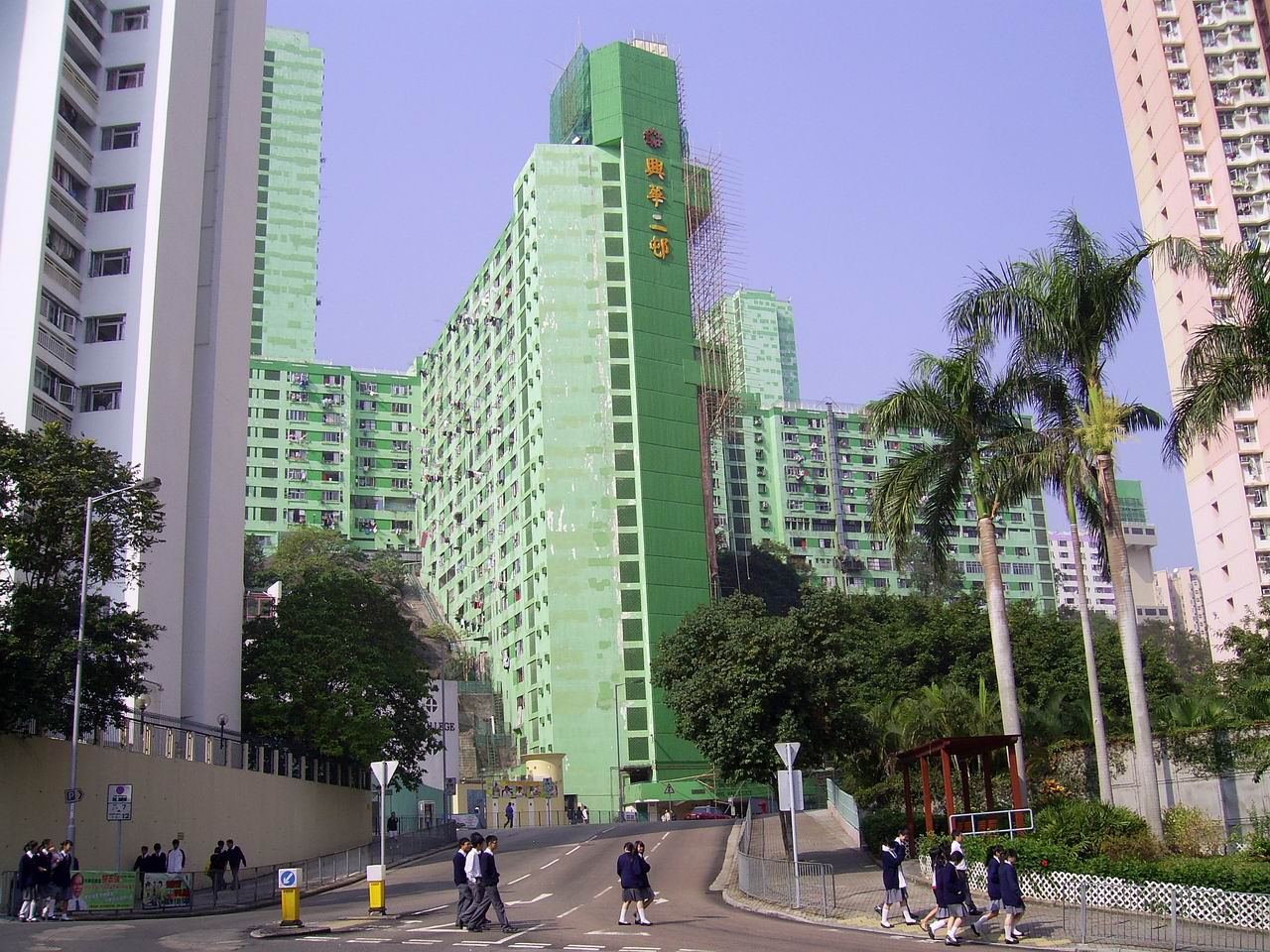
Hing Wah (II) Estate

Hing Wah Estate (Chinese: 興華邨) is a public housing estate in Chai Wan, near MTR Chai Wan station.

The estate comprises 10 residential buildings. The 7 "Old Slab" blocks belong to Hing Wah (I) Estate (Chinese: 興華(一)邨) completed in 1976, while the 3 "Harmony 1" buildings belong to Hing Wah (II) Estate (Chinese: 興華(二)邨) completed in 1999 and 2000.

=== Background ===
Hing Wah (I) Estate was a resettlement estate which had 3 resettlement blocks completed in 1971. 7 more "Old Slab" blocks were completed in 1976, which formed Hing Wah (II) Estate. The 3 resettlement blocks in Hing Wah (I) Estate were demolished in 1995, replaced by two rental blocks in 1999 and one HOS block in 2000 respectively. However, the government decided to change an HOS block from sale to rental finally, and renamed it from "Hing Tsui Court" to "Hing Tsui House".

=== Houses ===
Name	Type	Completion
Chin Hing House	Old Slab	1976
Fung Hing House	Old Slab	1976
Lok Hing House	Old Slab	1976
Ning Hing House	Old Slab	1976
On Hing House	Old Slab	1976
Wo Hing House	Old Slab	1976
Yu Hing House	Old Slab	1976
Cheuk Wah House	Harmony 1	1999
May Wah House	Harmony 1	1999
Hing Tsui House	Harmony 1	2000

== Hiu Tsui Court ==
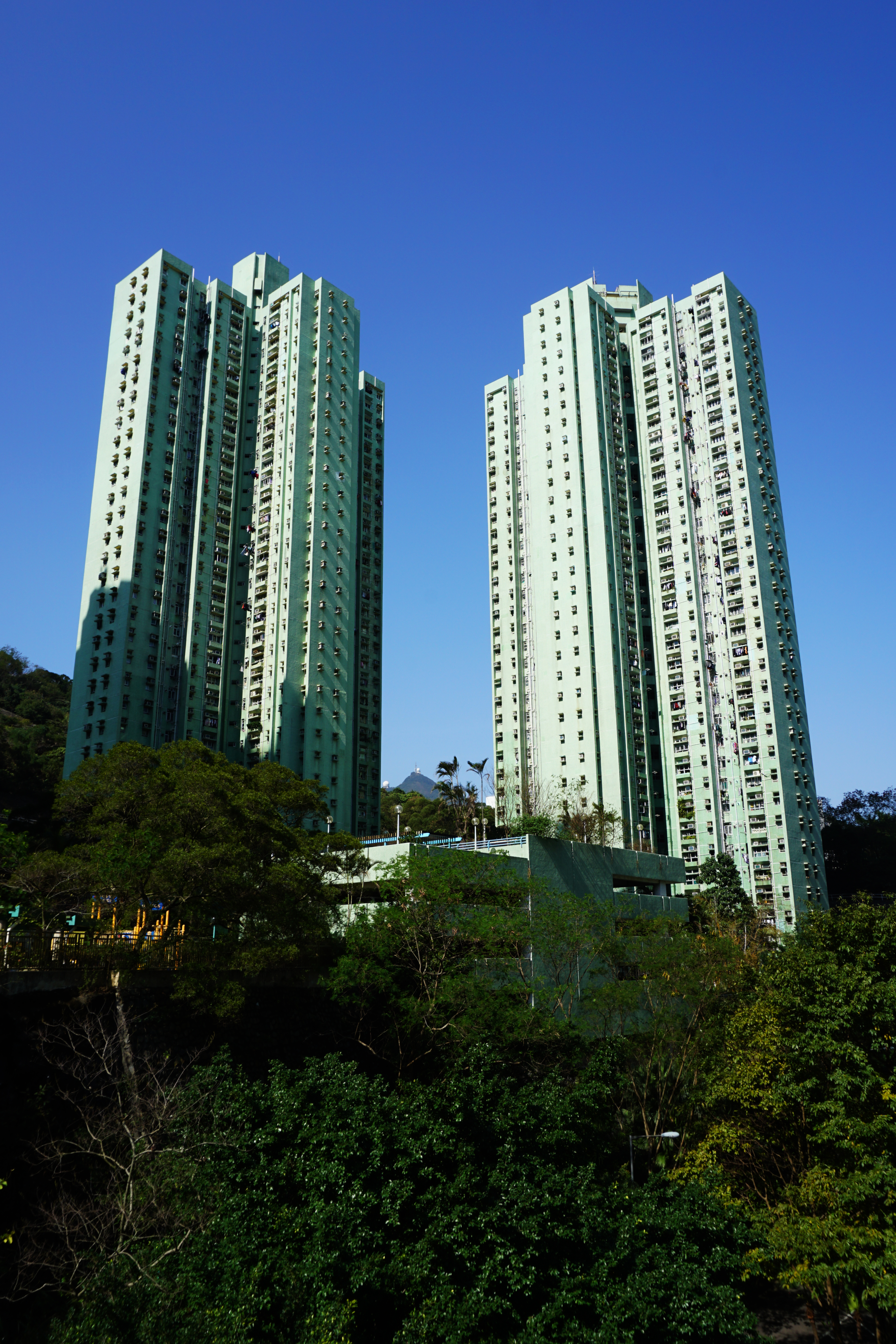
Hiu Tsui Court

Hiu Tsui Court (Chinese: 曉翠苑) is a Home Ownership Scheme court in at the south of Siu Sai Wan Road in Siu Sai Wan, near Siu Sai Wan Estate. Formerly the site of intelligence gathering centre established by British Armed Force until the 1980s. It has two blocks built in 1990.

Hui Tsui Court is in Primary One Admission (POA) School Net 16. Within the school net are multiple aided schools (operated independently but funded with government money) and two government schools: Shau Kei Wan Government Primary School and Aldrich Bay Government Primary School.

=== Houses ===
Name	Type	Completion
Ngar Tsui House	NCB (Ver.1984)	1990
Bik Tsui House	NCB (Ver.1984)	1990

== Kai Tsui Court ==
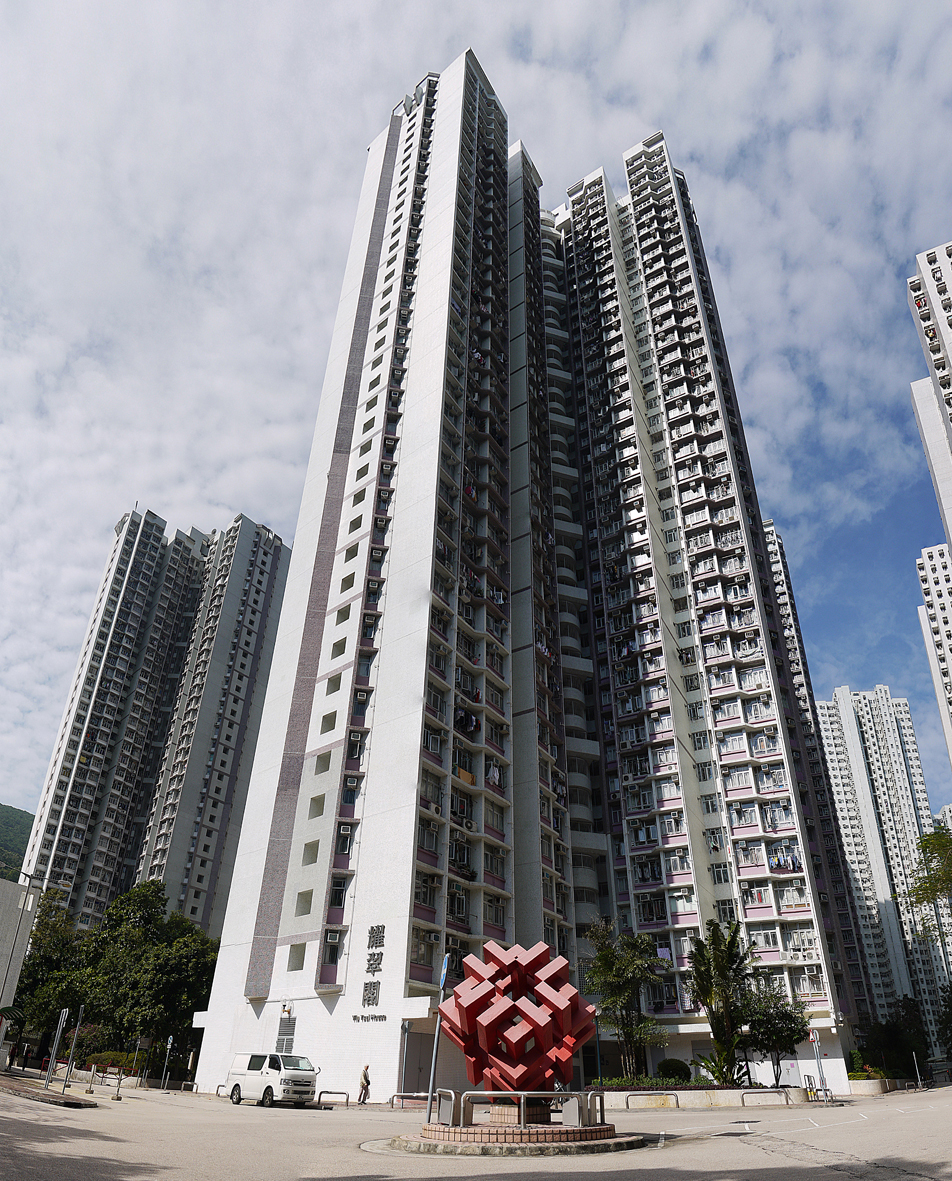
Kai Tsui Court

Kai Tsui Court (Chinese: 佳翠苑) is a Home Ownership Scheme court in at the south of Siu Sai Wan Road in Siu Sai Wan, near Siu Sai Wan Estate. Formerly the site of intelligence gathering centre established by British Armed Force until the 1980s, the court has two blocks built in 1993.

Kai Tsui is in Primary One Admission (POA) School Net 16. Within the school net are multiple aided schools (operated independently but funded with government money) and two government schools: Shau Kei Wan Government Primary School and Aldrich Bay Government Primary School.

=== Houses ===
Name	Type	Completion
Hin Tsui House	Harmony 1	1993
Yiu Tsui House	Harmony 1	1993

== Lok Hin Terrace ==
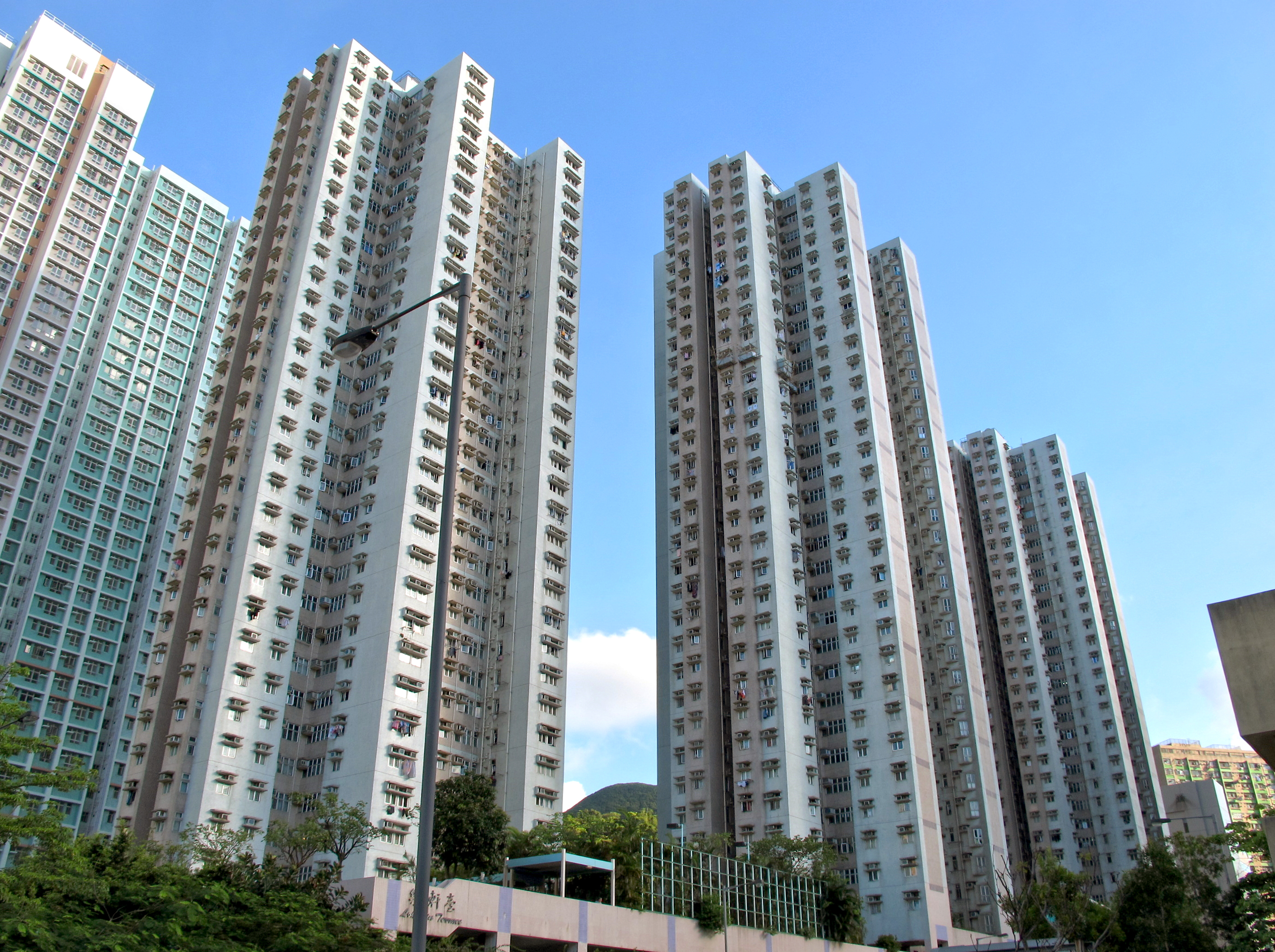
Lok Hin Terrace

Lok Hin Terrace (Chinese: 樂軒臺) is a Home Ownership Scheme and Private Sector Participation Scheme court in Chai Wan, located within a short walk to the MTR Chai Wan station. Formerly the site of Block 1 to 8 of old Chai Wan Estate, the court comprises five residential blocks of 31 storeys each, providing a total of 1,550 units.

=== Houses ===
Name	Type	Completion
Block 1	Private Sector Participation Scheme	1995
Block 2	Private Sector Participation Scheme	1995
Block 3	Private Sector Participation Scheme	1995
Block 4	Private Sector Participation Scheme	1995
Block 5	Private Sector Participation Scheme	1995

== Neptune Terrace ==
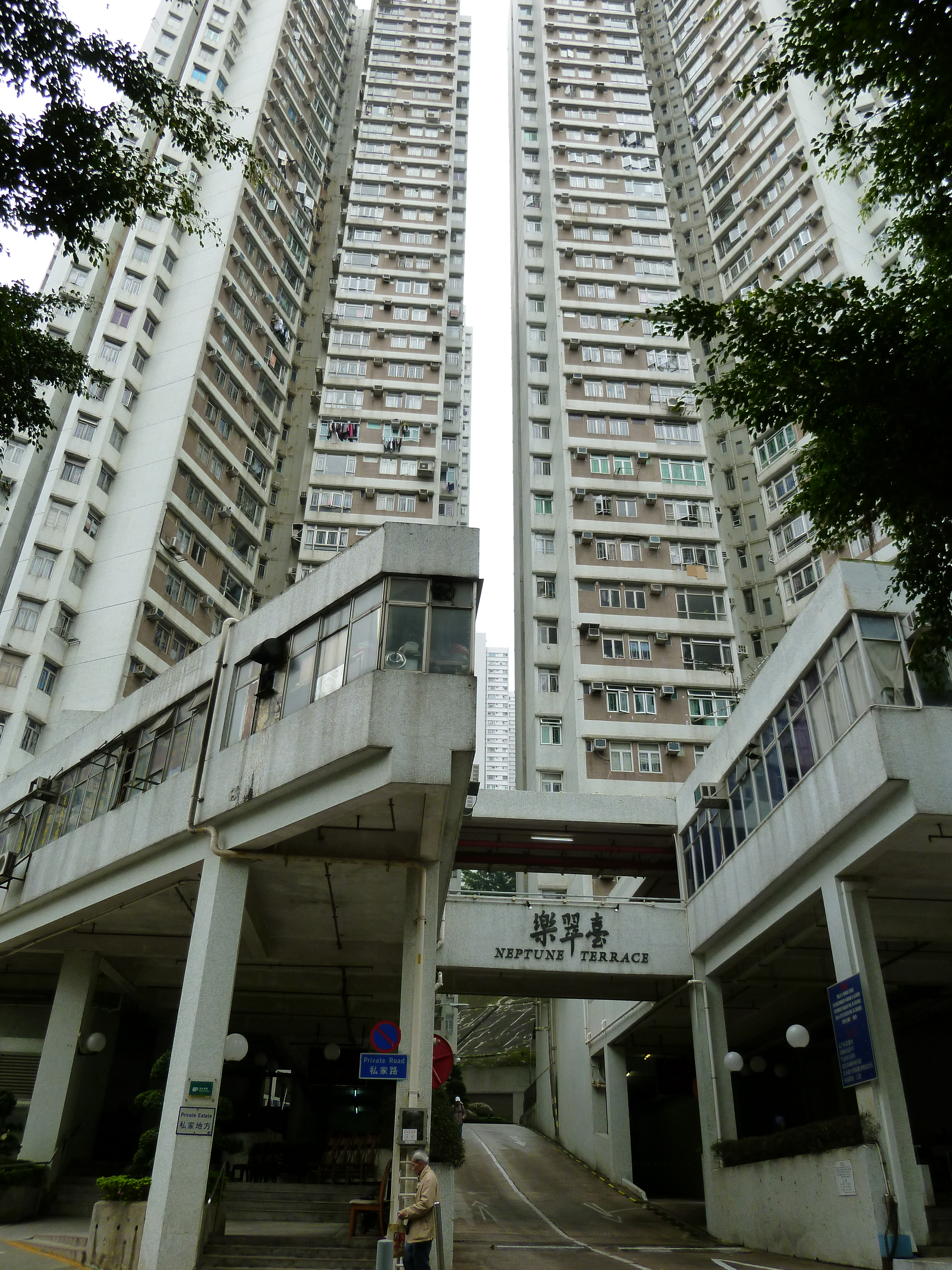
Neptune Terrace

Neptune Terrace (Chinese: 樂翠臺) is a Home Ownership Scheme and Private Sector Participation Scheme court in Chai Wan, with a few distance to MTR Chai Wan station and Greenwood Terrace. It was jointly developed by Hong Kong Housing Authority and New World Development.

=== Houses ===
Name	Type	Completion
Block 1	Private Sector Participation Scheme	1986
Block 2	Private Sector Participation Scheme	1986
Block 3	Private Sector Participation Scheme	1986

== Shan Tsui Court ==
Shan Tsui Court (Chinese: 山翠苑) is a Home Ownership Scheme court in Chai Wan, near Hing Man Estate. It has 4 blocks built in 1981 and it is one of the earliest HOS courts in Hong Kong.

=== Houses ===
Name	Type	Completion
Tsui Pui House	Non-Standard	1981
Tsui Yue House	Non-Standard	1981
Tsui Lam House	Non-Standard	1981
Tsui Pik House	Non-Standard	1981

== Siu Sai Wan Estate ==
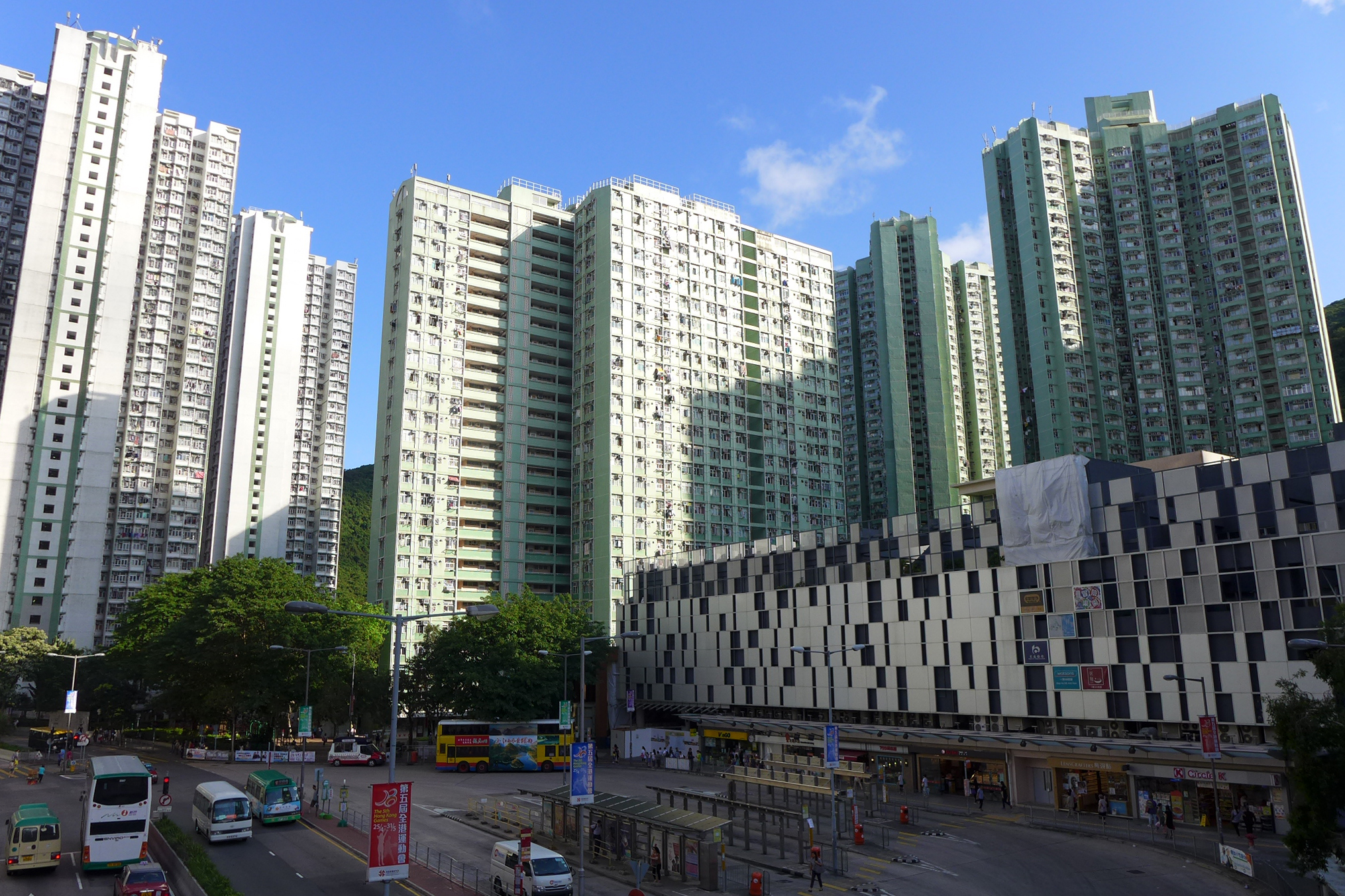
Siu Sai Wan Estate

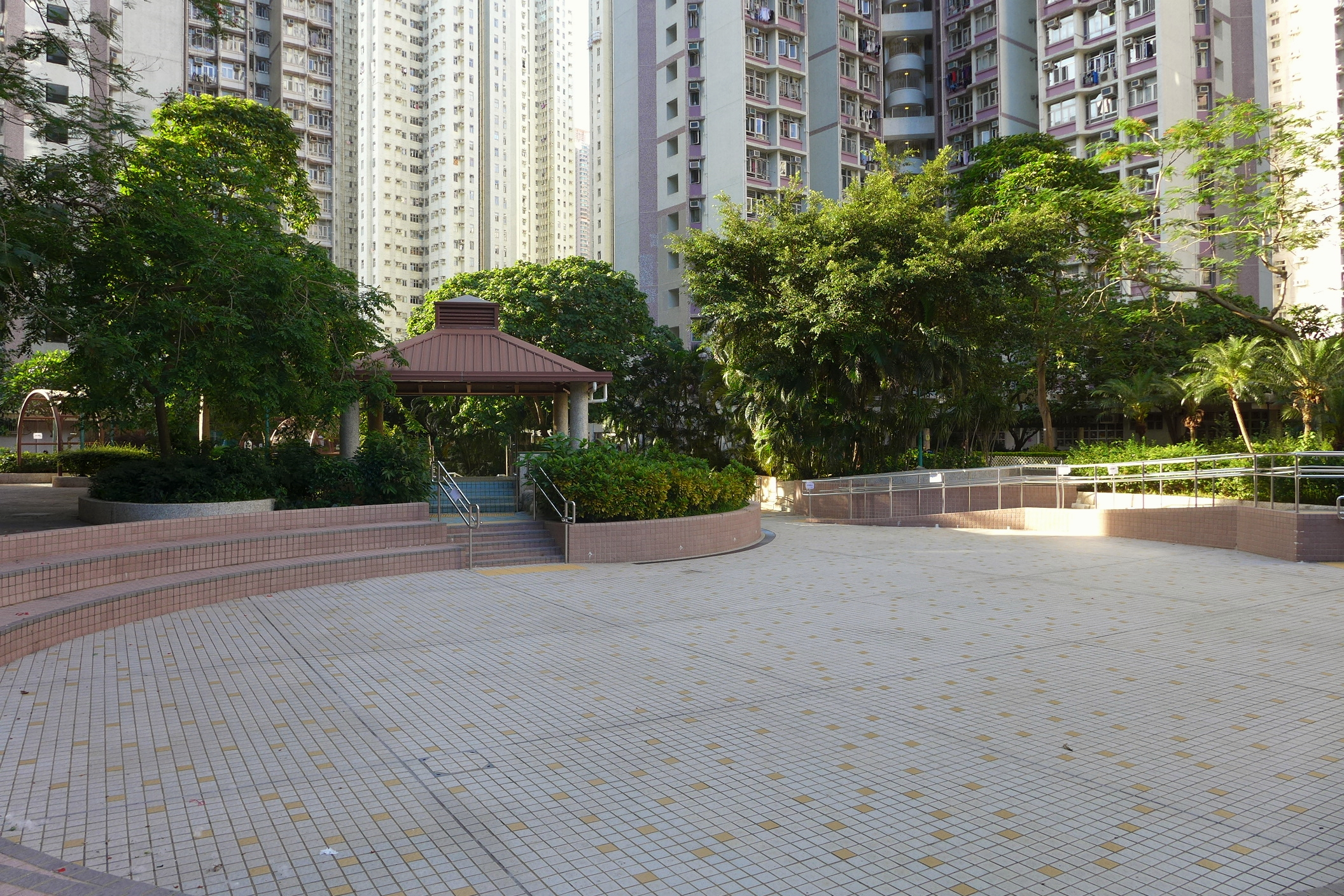
Abandoned pond have been changed to activity area in recent years

Siu Sai Wan Estate (Chinese: 小西灣邨) is the only public housing estate in Siu Sai Wan, Chai Wan. Formerly the site of intelligence gathering centre established by British Armed Force until the 1980s, the estate has 12 residential buildings completed in 1990 and 1993 respectively.

Siu Sai Wan Estate is in Primary One Admission (POA) School Net 16. Within the school net are multiple aided schools (operated independently but funded with government money) and two government schools: Shau Kei Wan Government Primary School and Aldrich Bay Government Primary School.

=== Houses ===
Name	Type	Completion
Sui Keung House	Trident 4	1990
Sui Fu House	Trident 4	1990
Sui Lok House	Trident 4	1990
Sui Hei House	Trident 4	1990
Sui Moon House	Linear 1	1990
Sui Yick House	Linear 1	1990
Sui Fat House	Linear 1	1990
Sui Fuk House	Linear 1	1990
Sui Shing House	Linear 1	1990
Sui Ming House	Harmony 1	1993
Sui Tai House	Harmony 1	1993
Sui Lung House	Harmony 1	1993

== Tsui Lok Estate ==
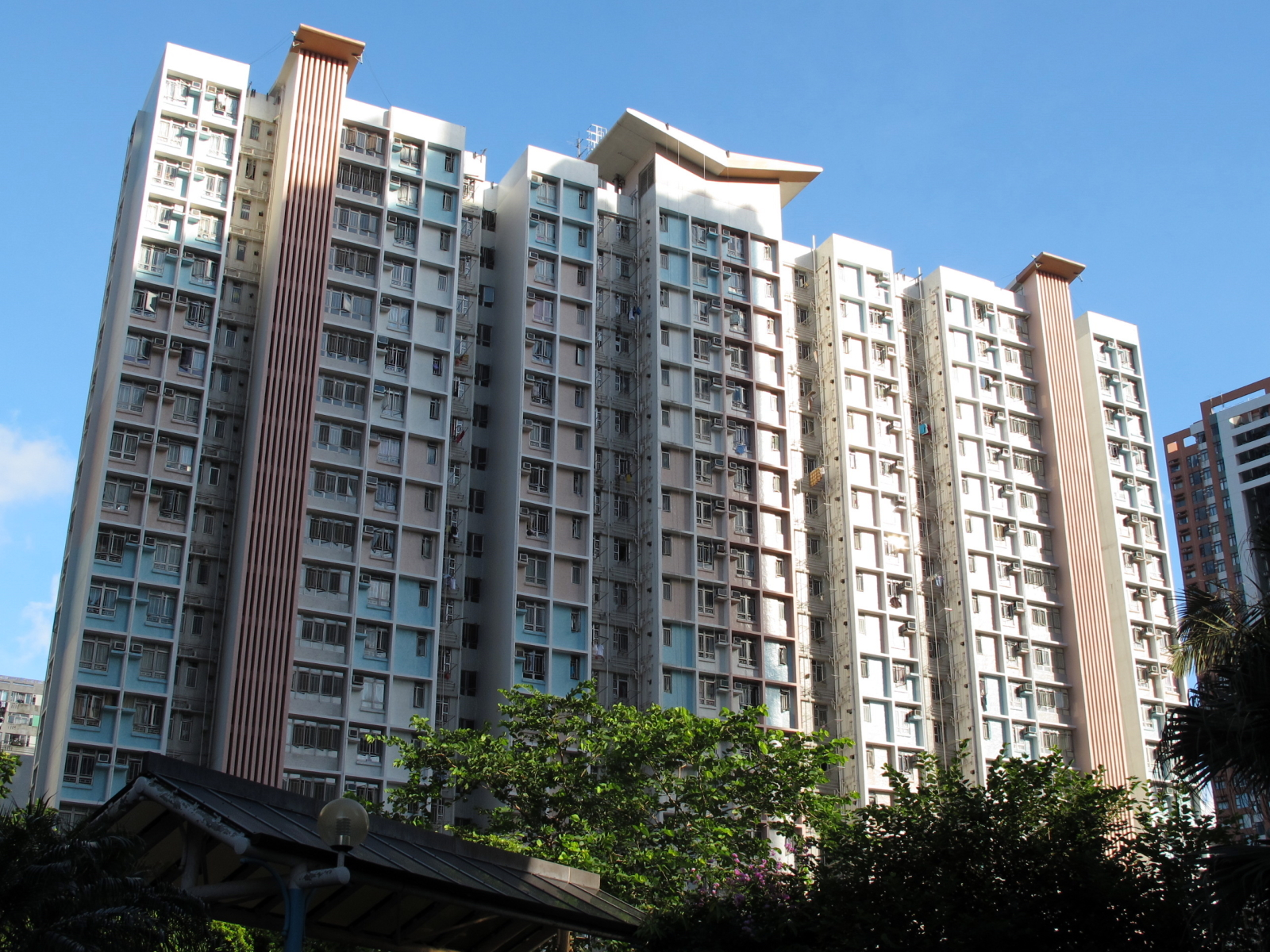
Tsui Lok Estate

Tsui Lok Estate (Chinese: 翠樂邨) is a public housing estate in Chai Wan, located near Chai Wan Park, Yue Wan Estate and Tsui Wan Estate. Built on the former site of Yue Wan Temporary Housing Area (Chinese: 漁灣臨時房屋區) on reclaimed land in Chai Wan, the estate consists of only 1 residential block built in 1999.

=== Houses ===
Name	Type	Completion
Tsui Lok House	Small Household Block	1999

== Tsui Wan Estate ==
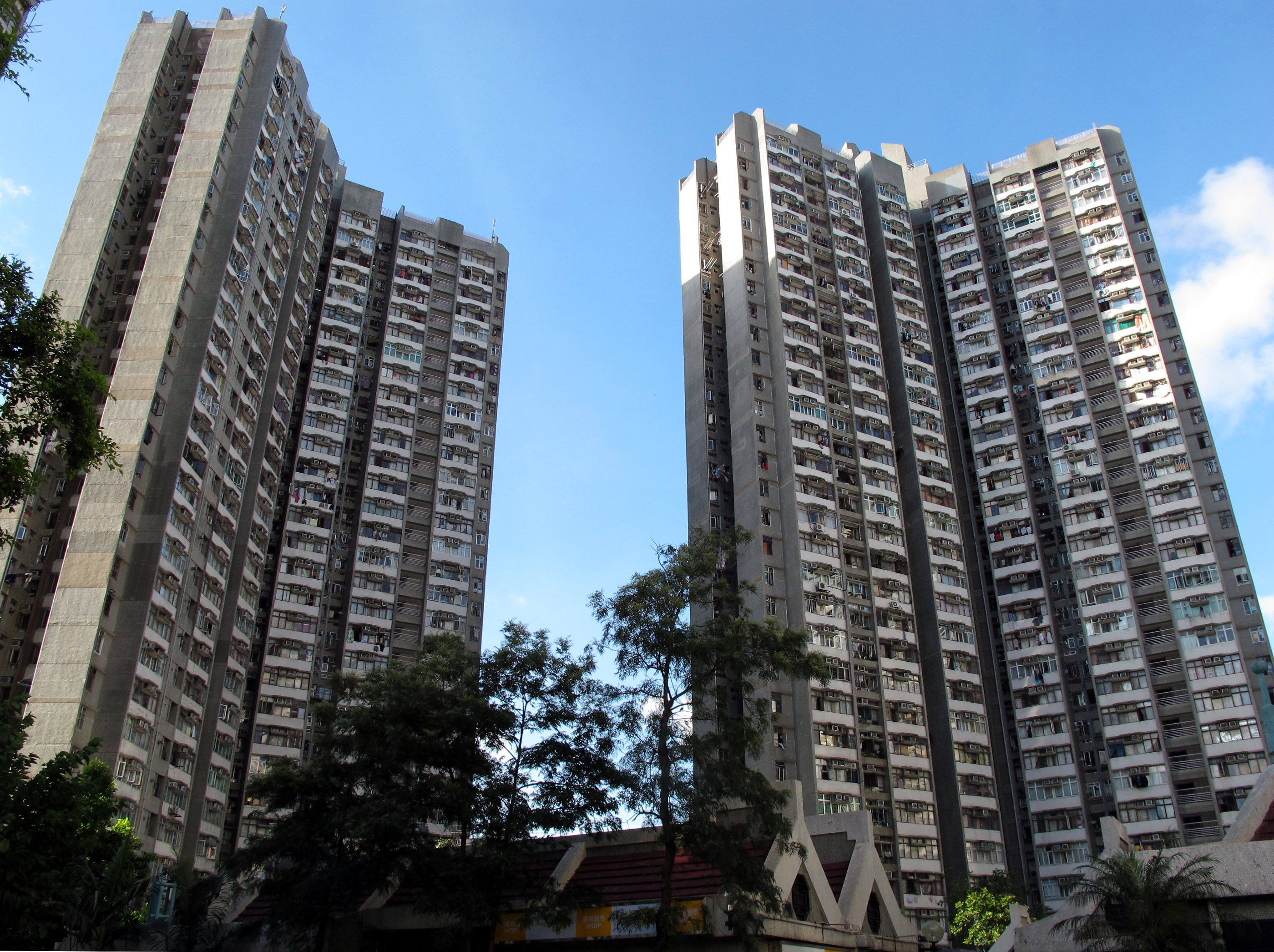
Tsui Wan Estate

Tsui Wan Estate (Chinese: 翠灣邨) is a mixed public/TPS estate in Chai Wan, located near Chai Wan Park, Yue Wan Estate and Tsui Lok Estate. Built on the reclaimed land in Chai Wan, the estate consists of 4 residential blocks built in 1988. In 1999, some of the flats were sold to tenants through Tenants Purchase Scheme Phase 2.

=== Houses ===
Name	Type	Completion
Tsui Fuk House	Trident 4	1988
Tsui Hong House	Trident 4	1988
Tsui Ning House	Trident 4	1988
Tsui Shou House	Trident 4	1988

== Walton Estate ==
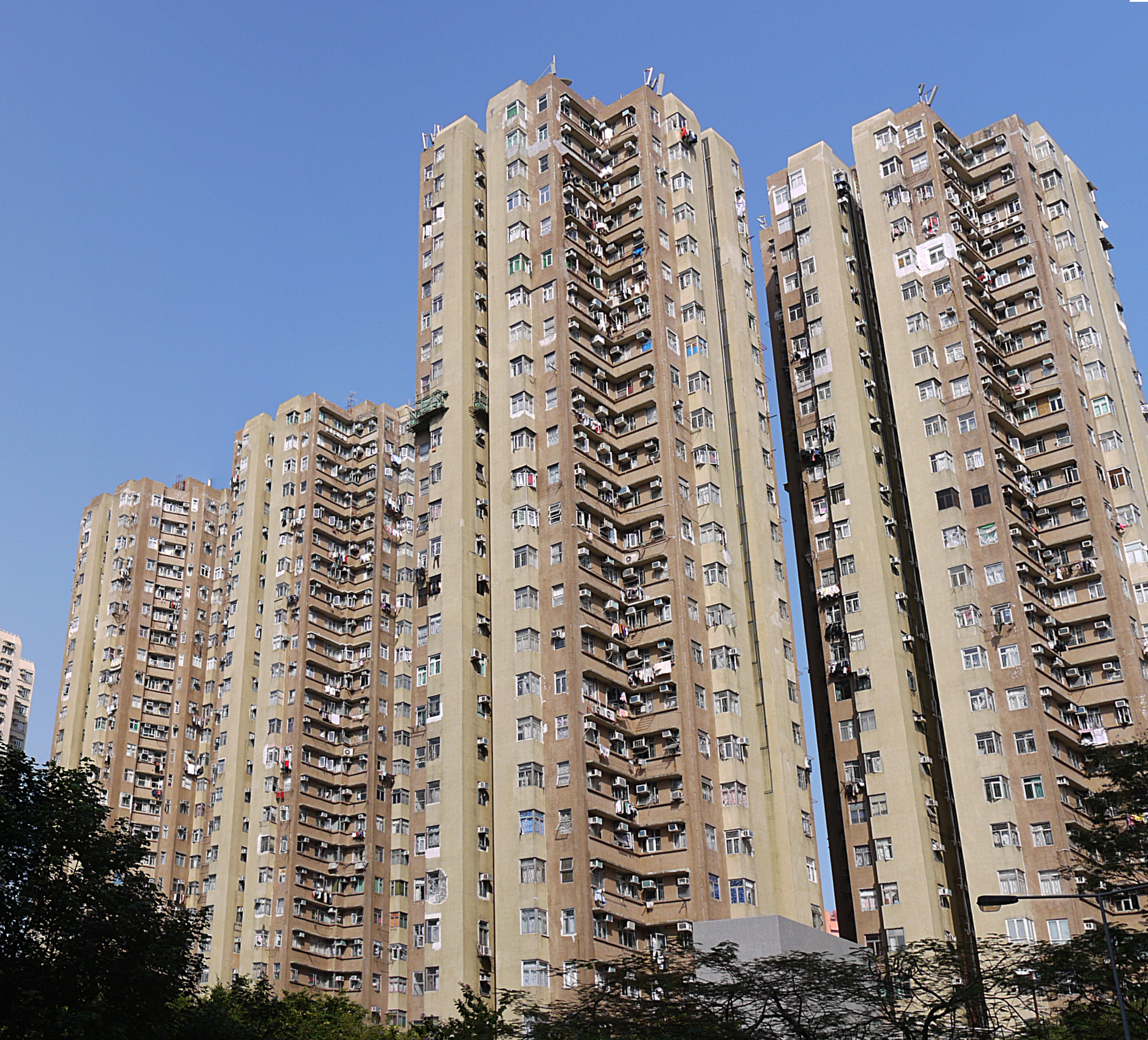
Walton Estate

Walton Estate (Chinese: 宏德居) is a Home Ownership Scheme and Private Sector Participation Scheme court in Chai Wan, near MTR Chai Wan station. Built on the reclaimed land, the estate has 4 blocks built in 1982 and is one of the oldest HOS courts in Hong Kong.

=== Houses ===
Name	Type	Completion
Block 1	Private Sector Participation Scheme	1982
Block 2	Private Sector Participation Scheme	1982
Block 3	Private Sector Participation Scheme	1982
Block 4	Private Sector Participation Scheme	1982

== Wah Ha Estate ==
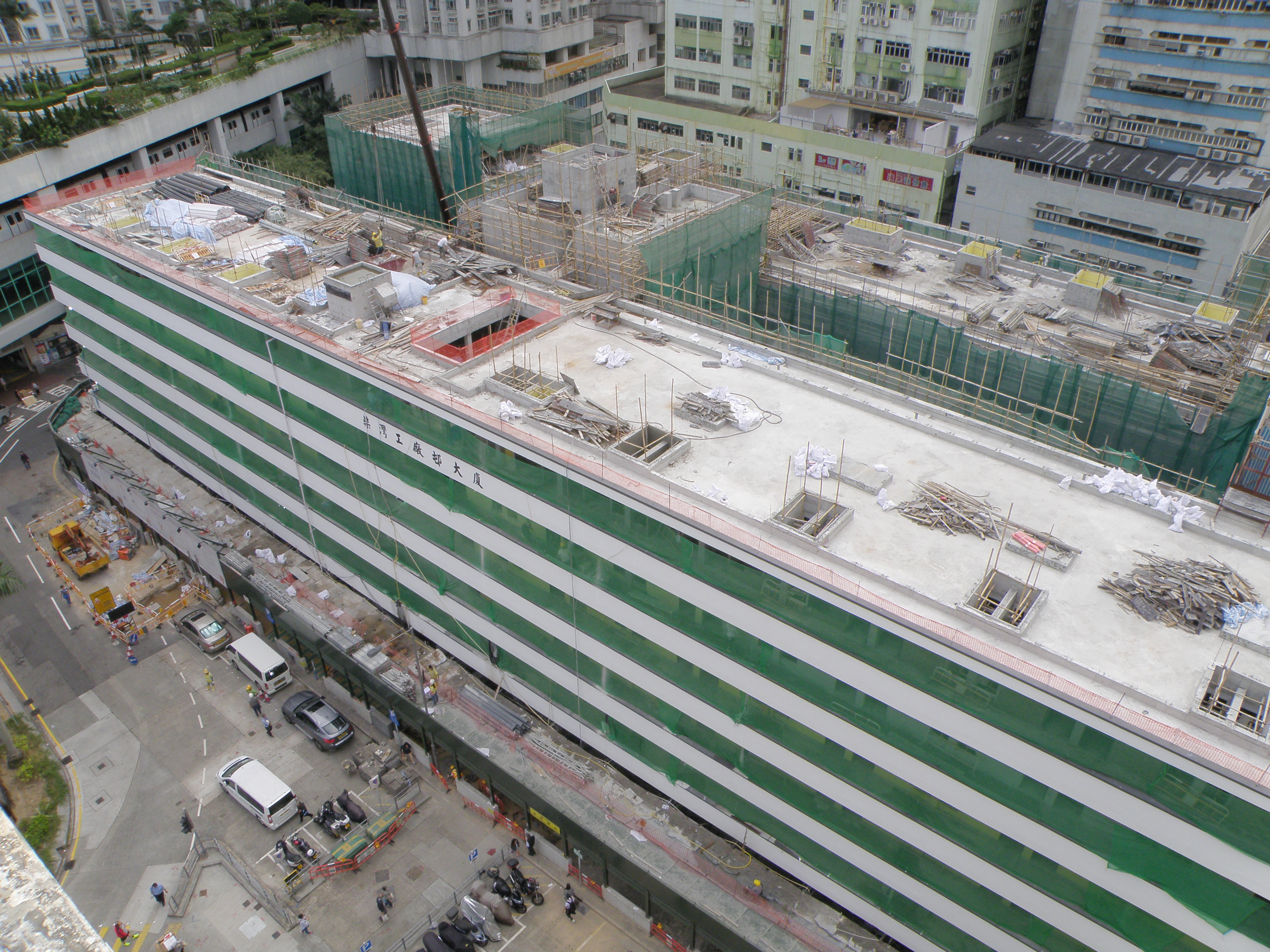
Conversion work of Chai Wan Factory Estate as at November 2015

Wah Ha Estate (Chinese: 華廈邨) is a public housing estate in Chai Wan, just adjacent to Chai Wan station. It is a 187-flat single block which was converted from former Chai Wan Factory Estate built in 1959. It was completed in 2016.

== Wan Tsui Estate, Yan Tsui Court and Yuet Chui Court ==
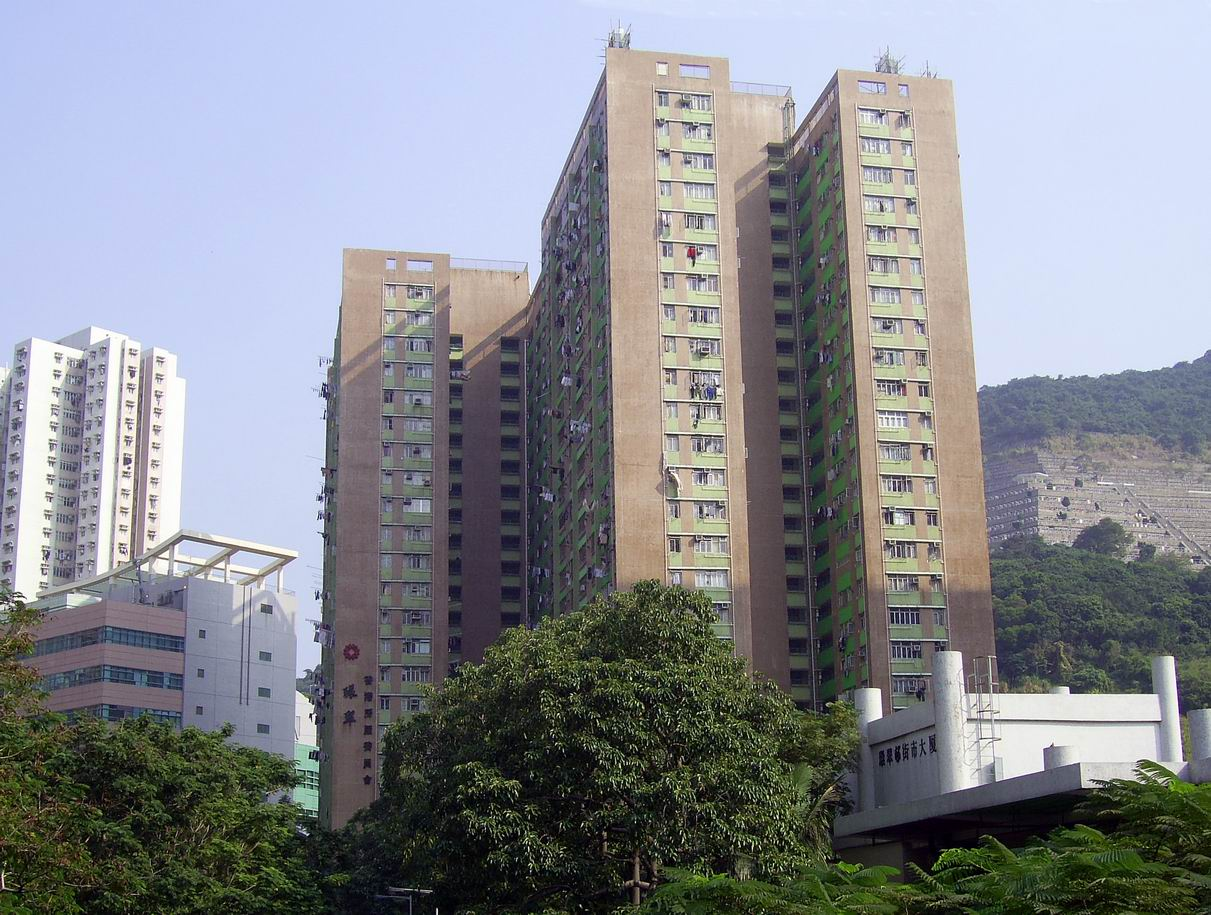
Wan Tsui Estate

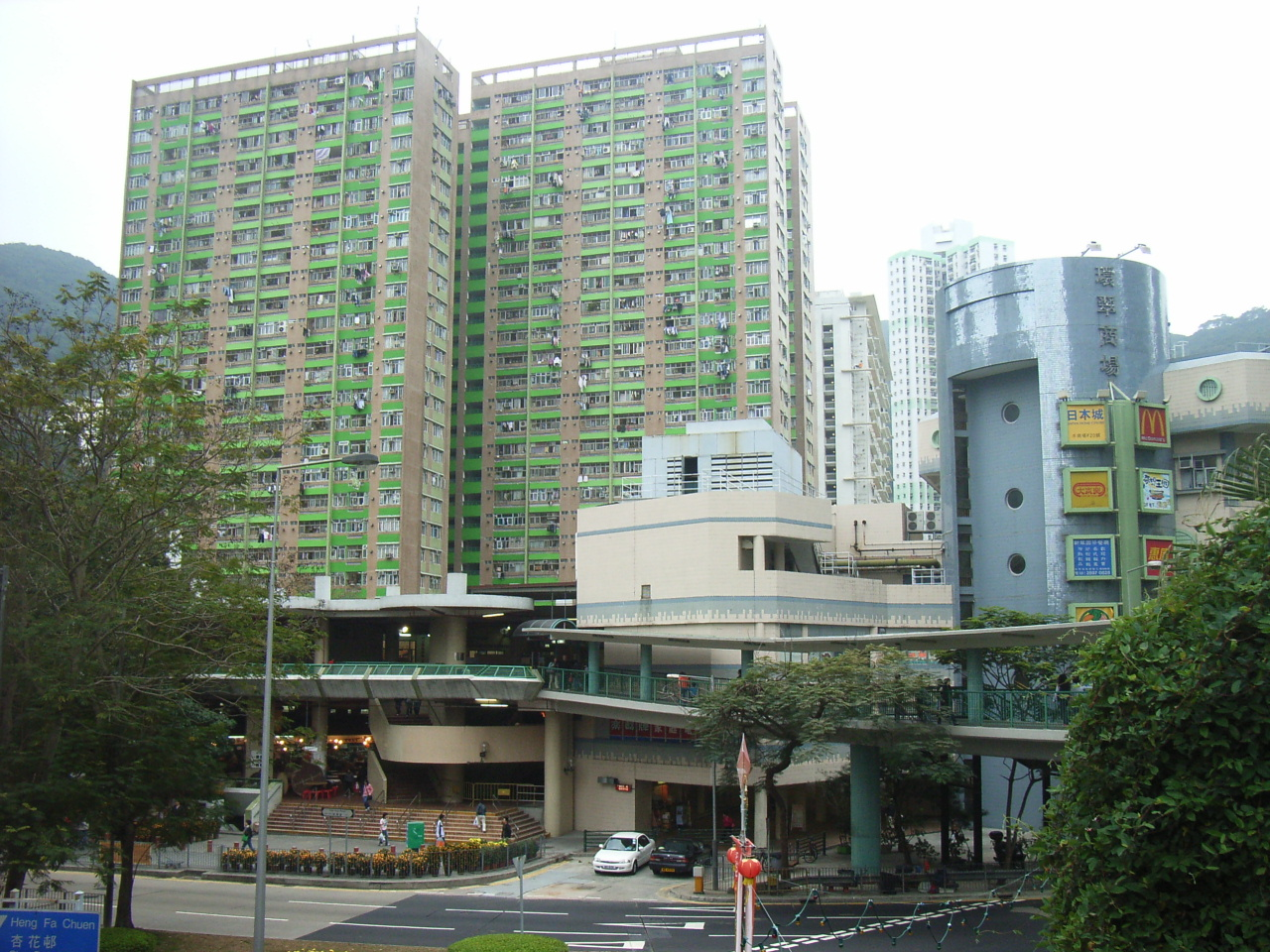
Wan Tsui Estate and Wan Tsui Shopping Centre

Wan Tsui Estate (Chinese: 環翠邨) is a public estate located at a part of former Chai Wan Estate and opposite to Chai Wan station. It now has 11 residential buildings completed between 1979 and 2001.

Yan Tsui Court (Chinese: 茵翠苑) and Yuet Chui Court (Chinese: 悅翠苑) are Home Ownership Scheme courts in Chai Wan, next to Wan Tsui Estate. They have 2 blocks (built in 1983) and 1 block (built in 1999) respectively.

=== Background ===
Wan Tsui Estate was formed between the late 1970s and early 1980s by the redevelopment of Chai Wan Estate and the assignment of Block 16 to 22 of Chai Wan Estate to Wan Tsui Estate. Also, Block 21 and Block 22 of Chai Wan Estate were redecorated and renamed to On Tsui House and Ning Tsui House, but they were finally demolished in 1996.

=== Houses ===
==== Wan Tsui Estate ====
Name	Type	Completion
Chak Tsui House	Old Slab	1980
Mei Tsui House	Old Slab	1979
Shing Tsui House	Old Slab	1979
Wai Tsui House	Old Slab	1979
Fook Tsui House	Single H	1980
Yee Tsui House	Single H	1979
Hei Tsui House	Double H	1986
Lee Tsui House	Double H	1986
Fu Tsui House	Double H	1986
Kwai Tsui House	Double H	1986
Yat Tsui House	Small Household Block	2001

==== Yan Tsui Court ====
Name	Type	Completion
Yan Wing House	Old Cruciform	1983
Yan Wah House	Old Cruciform	1983

==== Yuet Chui Court ====
Name	Type	Completion
Yuet Chui Court	New Cruciform	1999

== Yee Tsui Court ==
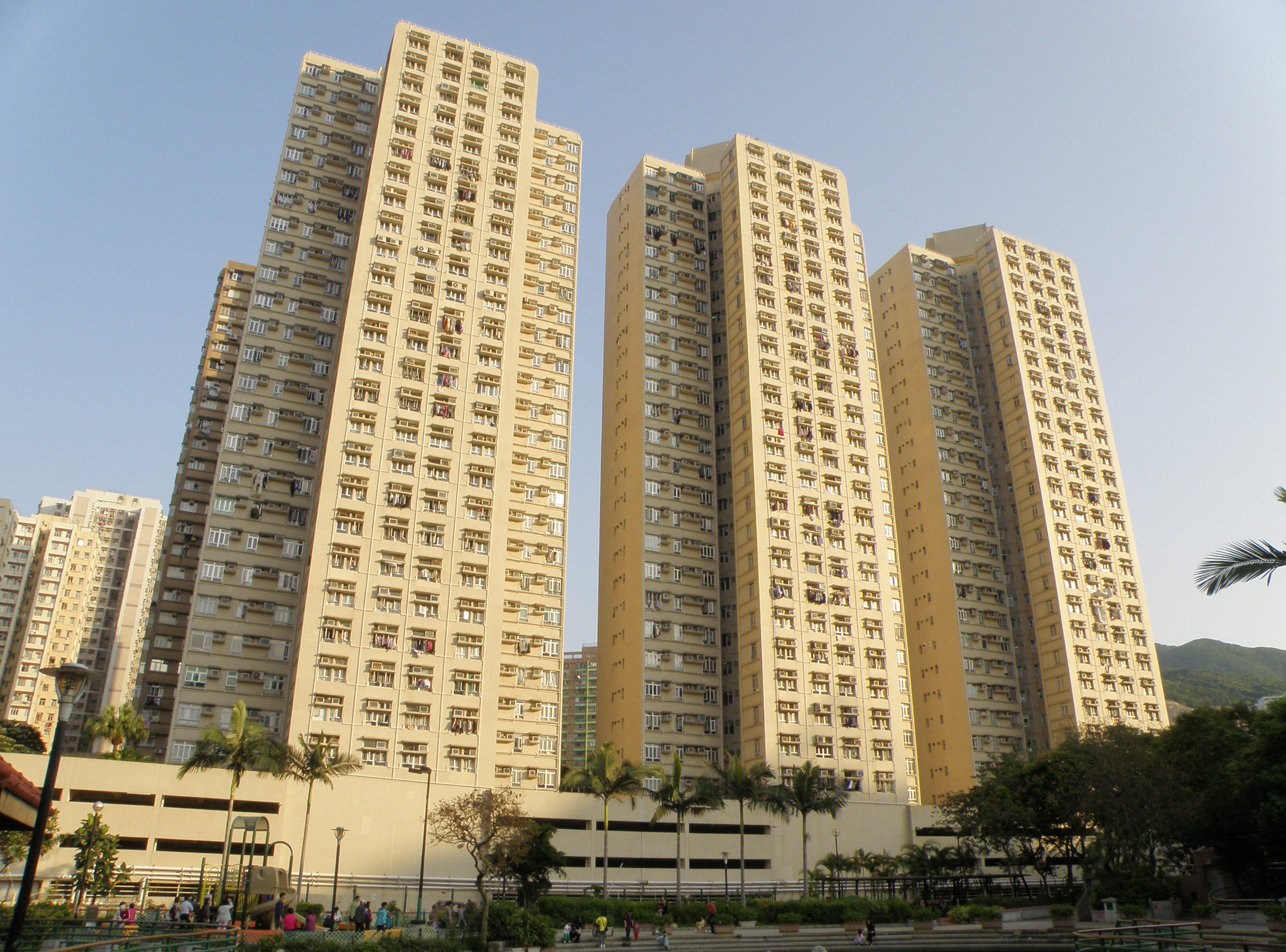
Yee Tsui Court

Yee Tsui Court (Chinese: 怡翠苑) is a Home Ownership Scheme court on the reclaimed land in Chai Wan, near Chai Wan Sports Centre. It has 3 blocks built in 1981, and it is one of the earliest HOS courts in Hong Kong.

=== Houses ===
Name	Type	Completion
Cheong Yee House	Flexi 2	1981
Yat Yee House	Flexi 2	1981
Lok Yee House	Flexi 2	1981

== Yue Wan Estate ==
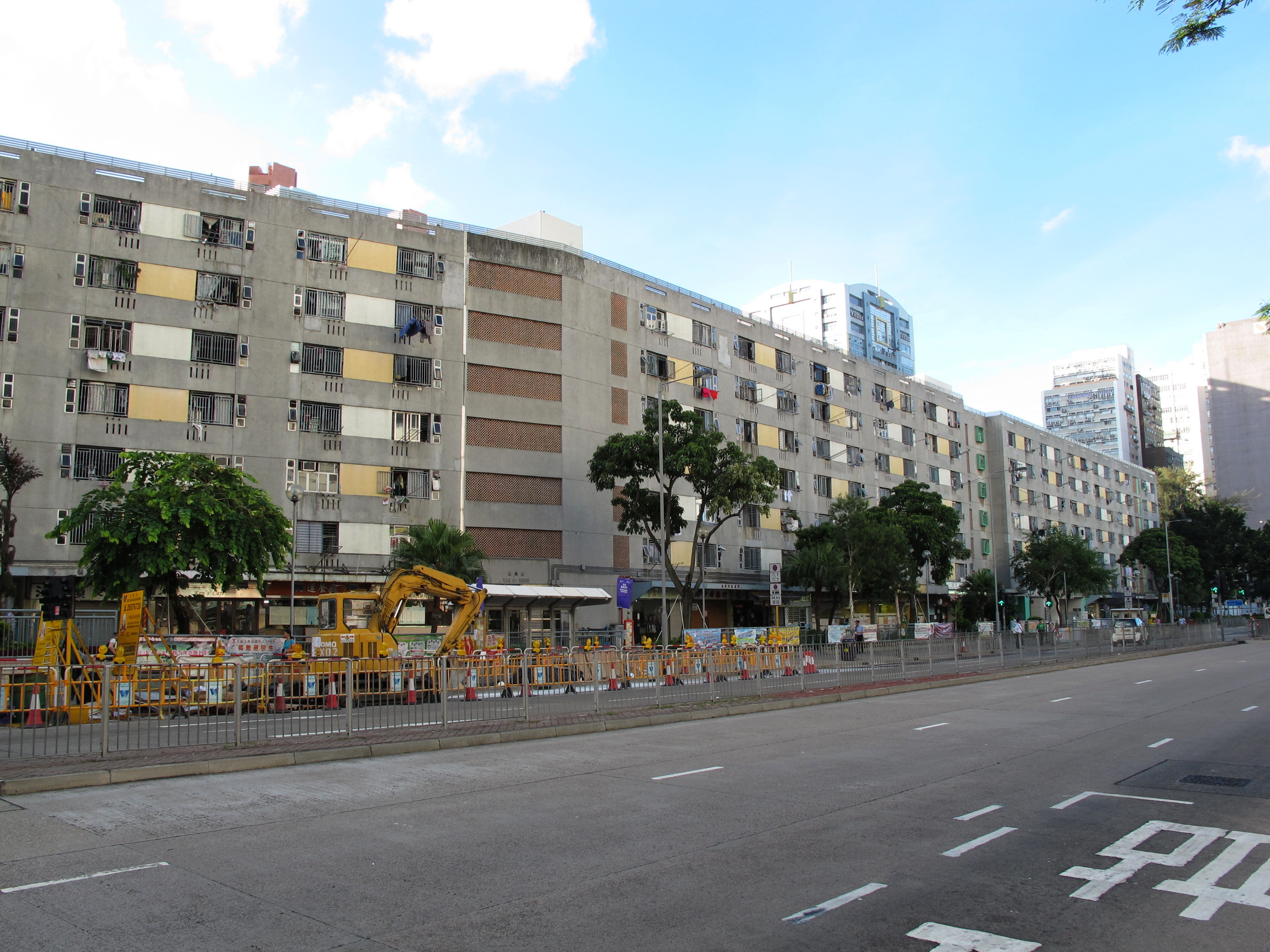
Yue Wan Estate

Yue Wan Estate (Chinese: 漁灣邨) is a public estate located near Chai Wan Park, Tsui Wan Estate and Tsui Lok Estate. Built on the reclaimed land in Chai Wan, the estate consists of 4 residential blocks, which were developed in 2 phases and built in 1977 and 1978 respectively.

=== Houses ===
Name	Type	Completion
Yue Fung House	Old Slab	1977
Yue On House	Old Slab	1977
Yue Tai House	Old Slab	1977
Yue Shun House	Old Slab	1978
Yue Chun House	Non-Standard	2020

== Chai Wan Estate ==
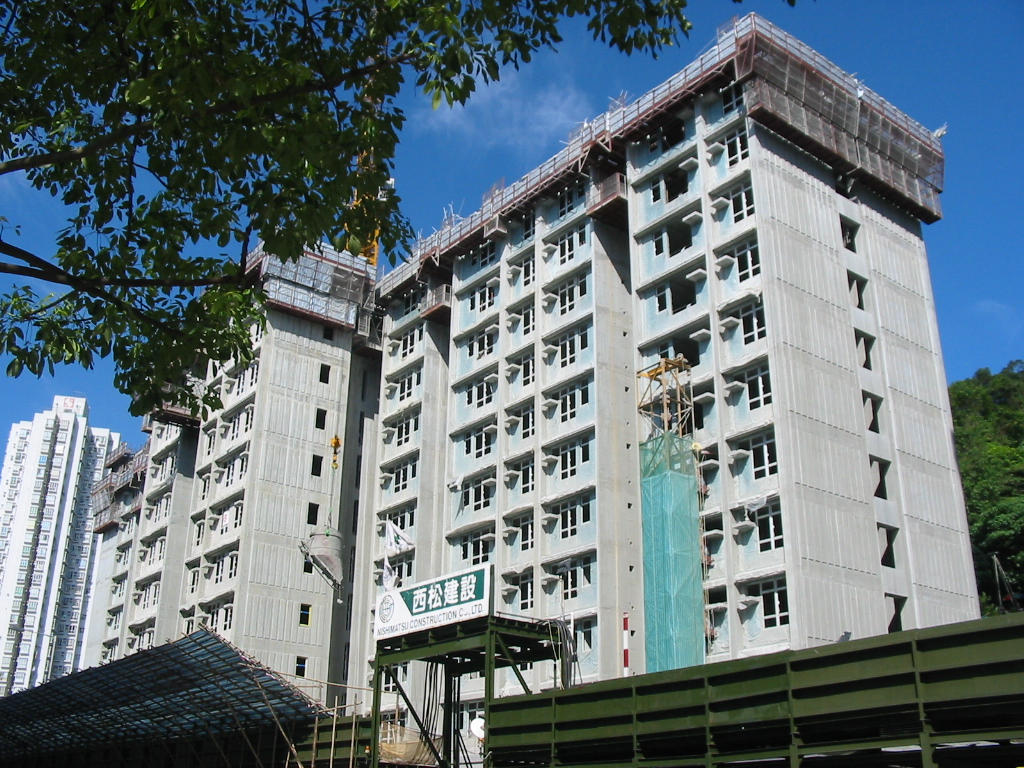
Buildings being built in Chai Wan Estate

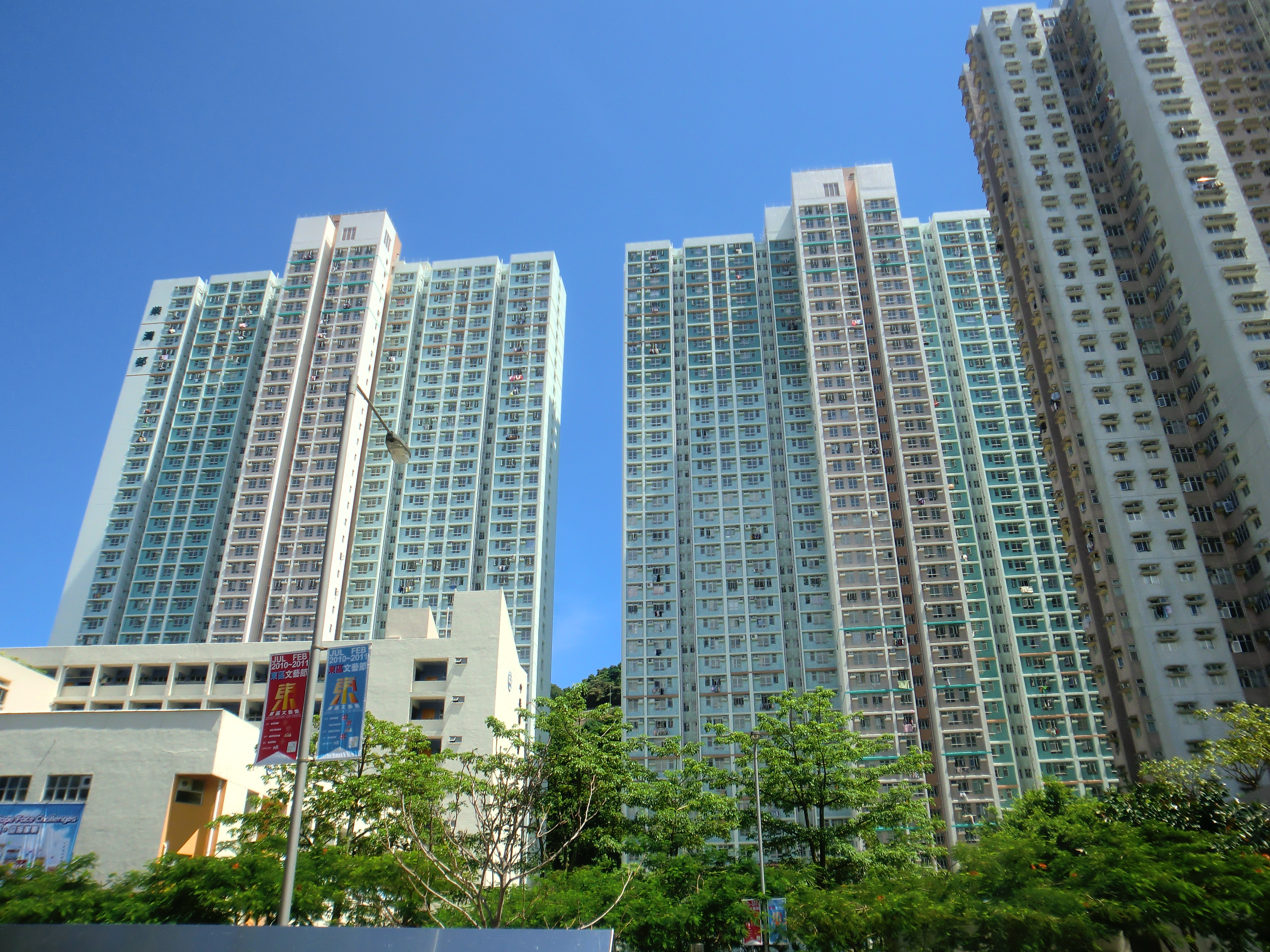
Entire two towers of Chai Wan Estate

Chai Wan Estate (Chinese: 柴灣邨) is a public estate near Chai Wan Road. It had a total of 27 residential blocks before demolition.

=== Background ===
Chai Wan Estate was a resettlement estate and had a total of 27 residential blocks. It has started redevelopment since the 1970s, and all residential blocks were demolished between 1975 and 2001. Wan Tsui Estate, Lok Hin Terrace, Chai Wan Municipal Services Building and several schools were constructed in the site of former Chai Wan Estate. But Block 21 and 22 were reserved and redecorated to be a part of Wan Chui Estate until they were demolished in 1996.

The site of the former Blocks 14 and 15 was redeveloped in 2010. The new two-block estate carries on the name "Chai Wan Estate".

=== Houses ===
Name	Type	Completion	Block in Old Chai Wan Estate
Wan Poon House (Block 1)	Non-Standard	2010	Block 14 & 15
Wan Ying House (Block 2)	Non-Standard	2010	Block 14 & 15

== Lin Tsui Estate ==
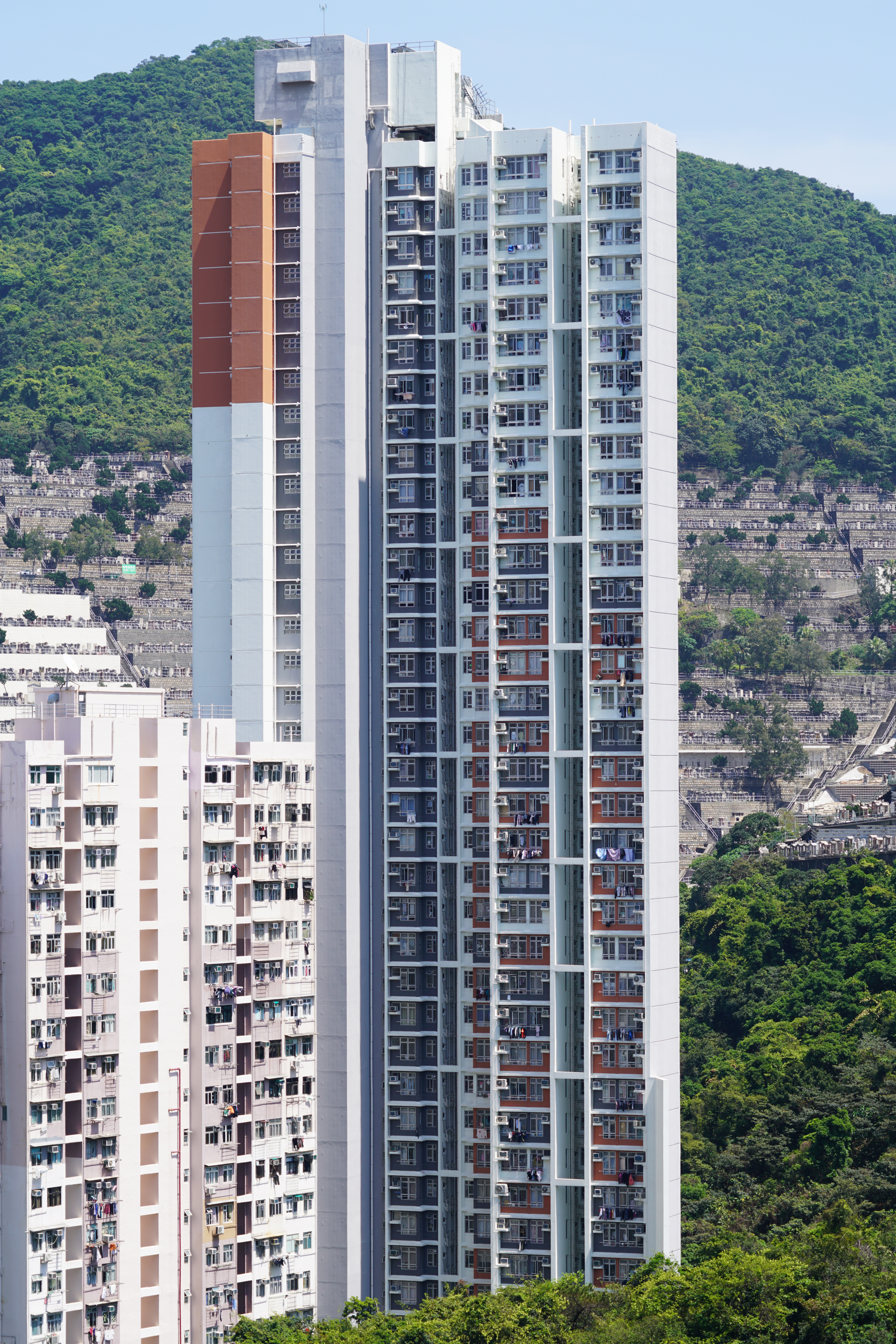
Lin Tsui Estate

Located next to Lin Shing Road and Wan Tsui Estate, Chai Wan, Lin Tsui Estate (Chinese: 連翠邨) is a single-block public estate inaugurated on 12 July 2018. The only building, Lin Tsui House, is 36-story high and located above a 3-story platform, with 8 flats on each floor.
