= Fullview Garden =

Public housing estate in Siu Sai Wan, Hong Kong

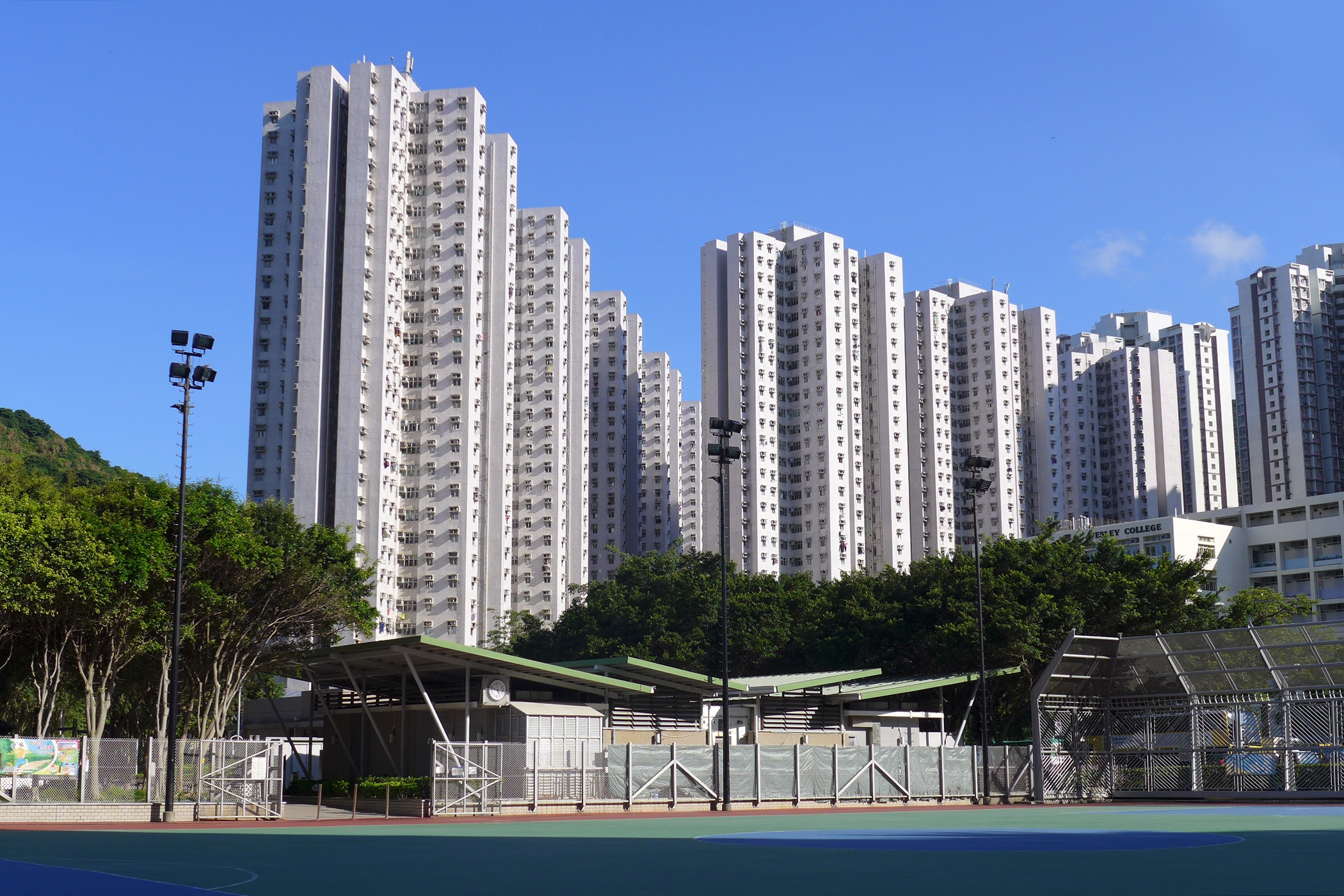
- Fullview Garden
- Interactive map of Fullview Garden

General information
- Location: 18 Siu Sai Wan Road, Siu Sai Wan; Hong Kong Island, Hong Kong
- Coordinates: 22.262610°N 114.252040°E
- Status: Completed
- Category: Home Ownership Scheme
- Population: 9,402 (2016)
- No. of blocks: 11
- No. of units: 3,240

Construction
- Constructed: 1993; 33 years ago
- Contractors: Chevalier Group
- Authority: Hong Kong Housing Authority

Fullview Garden (Chinese: 富景花園) is a Home Ownership Scheme and Private Sector Participation Scheme court located at the south of Siu Sai Wan Road in Siu Sai Wan, Hong Kong Island, Hong Kong near Siu Sai Wan Promenade, Cheerful Garden, Kai Tsui Court and Siu Sai Wan Estate. Formerly the site of intelligence gathering centre established by British Armed Force until the 1980s, it was jointly developed by the Hong Kong Housing Authority and Chevalier Group and has a total of eleven residential blocks built between 1993 and 1994.

== Houses ==
Name	Chinese name	Building type	Completed
Block 1	第1座	Private sector participation scheme	1993
Block 2	第2座	Private sector participation scheme	1993
Block 3	第3座	Private sector participation scheme	1993
Block 4	第4座	Private sector participation scheme	1993
Block 5	第5座	Private sector participation scheme	1993
Block 6	第6座	Private sector participation scheme	1993
Block 7	第7座	Private sector participation scheme	1994
Block 8	第8座	Private sector participation scheme	1994
Block 9	第9座	Private sector participation scheme	1994
Block 10	第10座	Private sector participation scheme	1994
Block 11	第11座	Private sector participation scheme	1994

== Demographics ==
According to the 2016 by-census, Fullview Garden had a population of 9,402. The median age was 49.4 and the majority of residents (96.3 per cent) were of Chinese ethnicity. The average household size was 3 people. The median monthly household income of all households (i.e. including both economically active and inactive households) was HK$35,000.

== Politics ==
Fullview Garden is located in King Yee constituency of the Eastern District Council. It was formerly represented by Tsang Yan-ying, who was elected in the 2019 elections until May 2021.

== Education ==
Fullview Garden is in Primary One Admission (POA) School Net 16. Within the school net are multiple aided schools (operated independently but funded with government money) and two government schools: Shau Kei Wan Government Primary School and Aldrich Bay Government Primary School.

== See also ==
- Public housing estates in Chai Wan and Siu Sai Wan
