= Hing Man (constituency) =

Hong Kong constituency

- Elected constituency for the Eastern District Council
- Boundary of Hing Man in Eastern District
- District: Eastern
- Legislative Council constituency: Hong Kong Island East
- Population: 14,601 (2019)
- Electorate: 9,063 (2019)

Current constituency
- Created: 1994
- Number of members: One
- Member: Tse Miu-yee (Independent)

Hing Man (Chinese: 興民) is one of the 35 constituencies in the Eastern District.

The constituency returns one district councillor to the Eastern District Council, with an election every four years. The seat is lastly held by Tse Miu-yee.

Hing Man loosely based on Hing Man Estate and Hing Wah (I) Estate in Chai Wan with estimated population of 14,601.

== Councillors represented ==
Election	Member	Party
1994	Wong Lap-shing	DAB
1999	Chao Shing-kie	DAB
2011	Lau Hing-yeung	DAB
2019	Tse Miu-yee	Independent

== Election results ==
=== 2010s ===
Eastern District Council Election, 2019: Hing Man
Party	Candidate	Votes	%	±%
Independent	Tse Miu-yee	3,297	51.44	
DAB	Lau Hing-yeung	3,113	48.56	
Majority		184	2.88	
Turnout		6,438	71.08	
Independent gain from DAB		Swing		
