= Hing Man Estate =

Public housing estate in Chai Wan, Hong Kong

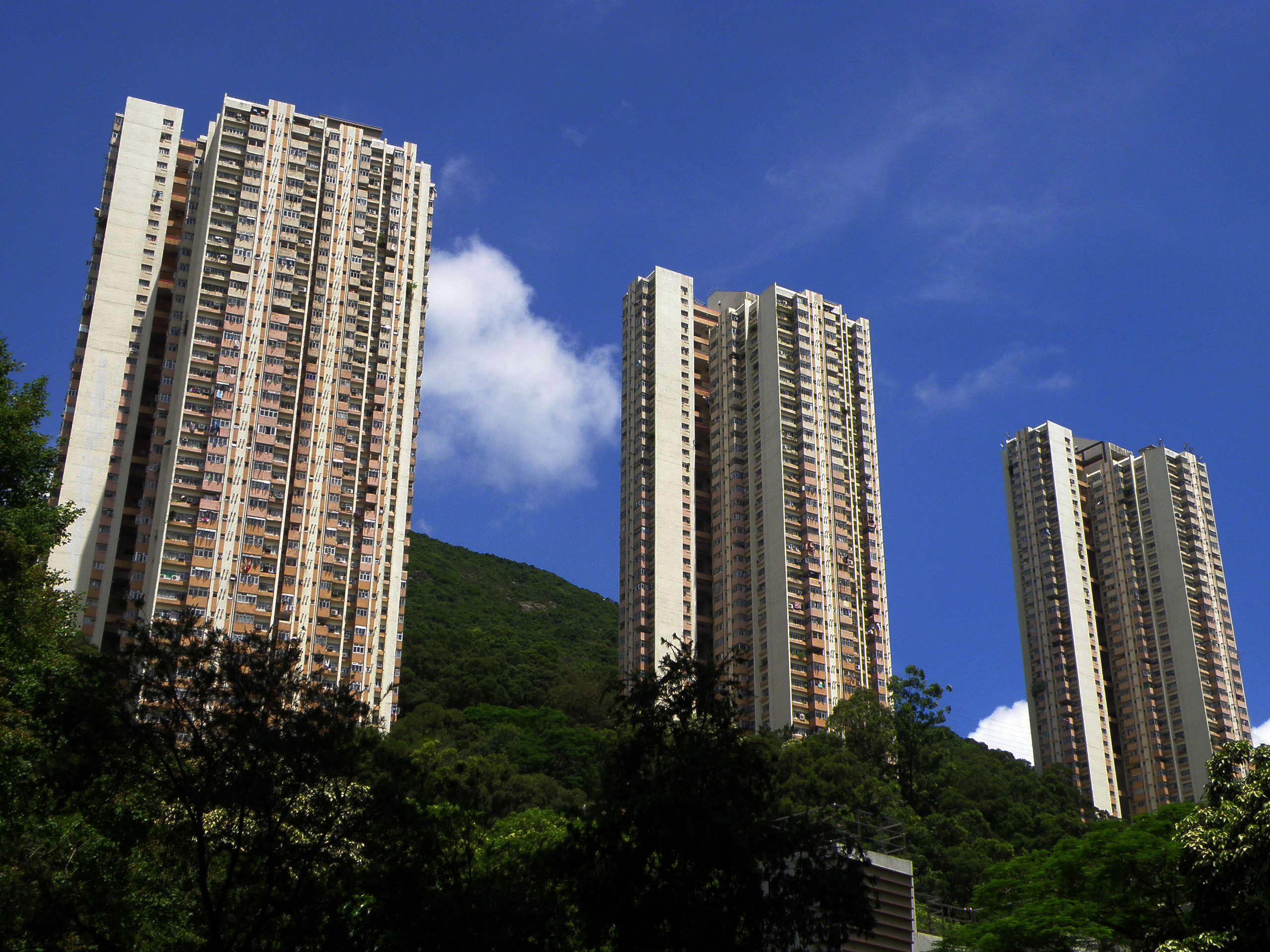
- Hing Man Estate
- Interactive map of Hing Man Estate

General information
- Location: 188 Tai Tam Road, Chai Wan; Hong Kong Island, Hong Kong
- Coordinates: 22.266689°N 114.232478°E
- Status: Completed
- Category: Public rental housing
- Population: 5,795 (2016)
- No. of blocks: 3
- No. of units: 1,999

Construction
- Constructed: 1982; 44 years ago
- Authority: Hong Kong Housing Authority

Hing Man Estate (Chinese: 興民邨) is a public housing estate in Chai Wan, Hong Kong Island, Hong Kong located at the north of Hing Wah Estate and near Pamela Youde Nethersole Eastern Hospital. It consists of three Cruciform-typed residential blocks completed in 1982.

Shan Tsui Court (Chinese: 山翠苑) is a Home Ownership Scheme court in Chai Wan, next to Hing Man Estate. It has four residential blocks completed in 1981.

== Houses ==
=== Hing Man Estate ===
Name	Chinese name	Building type	Completed
Man Chak House	民澤樓	Cross	1982
Man Fu House	民富樓	Cross	1982
Man Yat House	民逸樓	Cross	1982

=== Shan Tsui Court ===
Name	Chinese name	Building type	Completed
Tsui Pui House	翠珮樓	Non-standard	1981
Tsui Yue House	翠瑜樓	Non-standard	1981
Tsui Lam House	翠琳樓	Non-standard	1981
Tsui Pik House	翠碧樓	Non-standard	1981

== Demographics ==
According to the 2016 by-census, Hing Man Estate had a population of 5,795. The median age was 46.6 and the majority of residents (97.8 per cent) were of Chinese ethnicity. The average household size was 3.1 people. The median monthly household income of all households (i.e. including both economically active and inactive households) was HK$23,550.

== Politics ==
For the 2019 District Council election, the estate fell within two constituencies. Hing Man Estate is located in the Hing Man constituency, which was formerly represented by Tse Miu-yee until July 2021, while Shan Tsui Court falls within the Lok Hong constituency, which was formerly represented by Tsang Kin-shing until July 2021.

== Education ==
Shan Tsui Court is in Primary One Admission (POA) School Net 16. Within the school net are multiple aided schools (operated independently but funded with government money) and two government schools: Shau Kei Wan Government Primary School and Aldrich Bay Government Primary School.

== See also ==
- Public housing estates in Chai Wan and Siu Sai Wan
