= Wan Tsui Estate =

Public housing estate in Chai Wan, Hong Kong

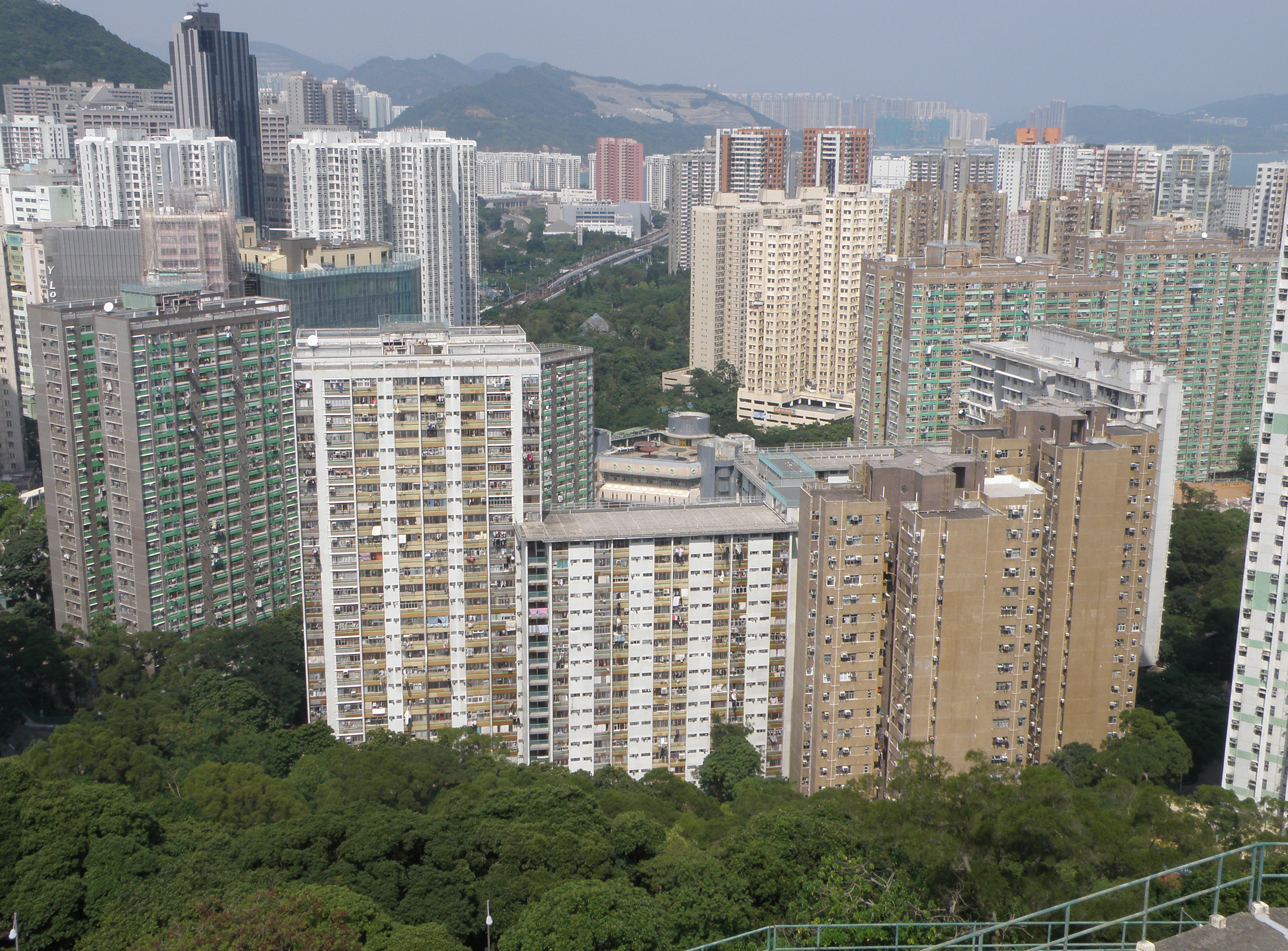
- Wan Tsui Estate
- Interactive map of Wan Tsui Estate

General information
- Location: 1-5 Yan Tsui Street; 8-10 Wah Ha Street; 2, 6 Fu Tsui Street; 3-9 Tsui King Street; Chai Wan; Hong Kong Island, Hong Kong
- Coordinates: 22.2615°N 114.23743°E
- Status: Completed
- Category: Public rental housing
- Population: 10,109 (2016)
- No. of blocks: 11
- No. of units: 3,678

Construction
- Constructed: 1979; 47 years ago
- Authority: Hong Kong Housing Authority

Wan Tsui Estate (Chinese: 環翠邨) is a public housing estate in Chai Wan, Hong Kong Island, Hong Kong located at a part of former Chai Wan Estate and opposite to MTR Chai Wan station. It now has eleven residential buildings completed between 1979 and 2001.

Yan Tsui Court (Chinese: 茵翠苑) and Yuet Chui Court (Chinese: 悅翠苑) are Home Ownership Scheme courts in Chai Wan, next to Wan Tsui Estate. They have two residential blocks (built in 1983) and one residential block (built in 1999) respectively.

== Houses ==
=== Wan Tsui Estate ===
Name	Chinese name	Building type	Completed
Chak Tsui House	澤翠樓	Old Slab	1980
Mei Tsui House	美翠樓	Old Slab	1979
Shing Tsui House	盛翠樓	Old Slab	1979
Wai Tsui House	蕙翠樓	Old Slab	1979
Fook Tsui House	褔翠樓	Single H	1980
Yee Tsui House	怡翠樓	Single H	1979
Hei Tsui House	喜翠樓	Double H	1986
Lee Tsui House	利翠樓	Double H	1986
Fu Tsui House	富翠樓	Double H	1986
Kwai Tsui House	貴翠樓	Double H	1986
Yat Tsui House	逸翠樓	Small Household Block	2001

=== Yan Tsui Court ===
Name	Chinese name	Building type	Completed
Yan Wing House	茵榮閣	Old Cruciform	1983
Yan Wah House	茵華閣	Old Cruciform	1983

=== Yuet Chui Court ===
Name	Chinese name	Building type	Completed
Yuet Chui Court	悅翠苑	New Cruciform (Ver.1984)	1999

== Demographics ==
According to the 2016 by-census, Wan Tsui Estate had a population of 10,109. The median age was 45.6 and the majority of residents (97.4 per cent) were of Chinese ethnicity. The average household size was 2.8 people. The median monthly household income of all households (i.e. including both economically active and inactive households) was HK$22,490.

== Politics ==
Wan Tsui Estate, Yan Tsui Court and Yuet Chui Court are located in Wan Tsui constituency of the Eastern District Council. It was formerly represented by Ng Cheuk-ip, who was elected in the 2019 elections until July 2021.

== Education ==
Wan Tsui Estate is in Primary One Admission (POA) School Net 16. Within the school net are multiple aided schools (operated independently but funded with government money) and two government schools: Shau Kei Wan Government Primary School and Aldrich Bay Government Primary School.

== See also ==
- Public housing estates in Chai Wan and Siu Sai Wan
