= Chai Wan Park =

Park in Chai Wan, Hong Kong

Coordinates: 22.2668°N 114.2384°E

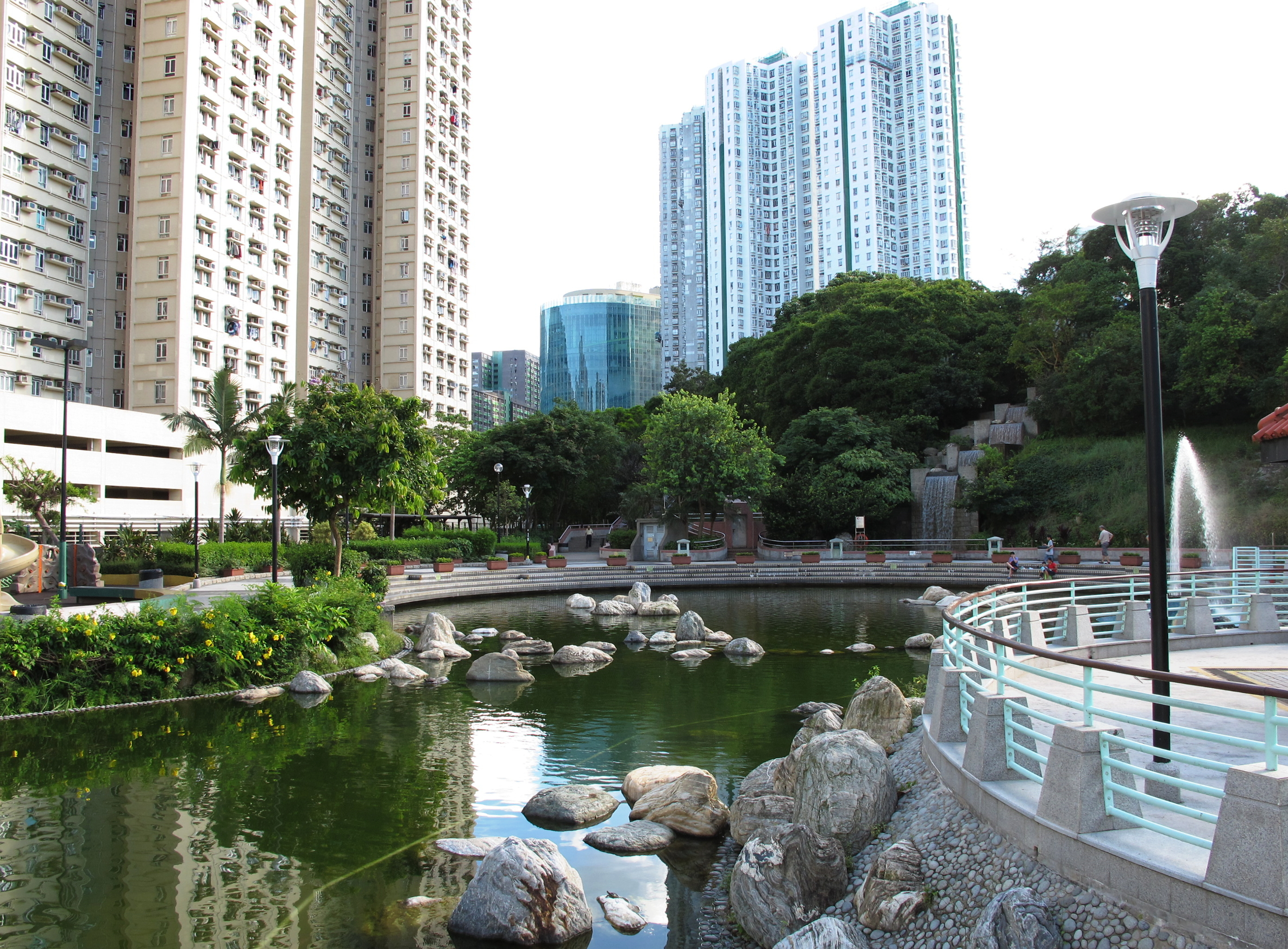
Chai Wan Park Lily Pond in July 2010

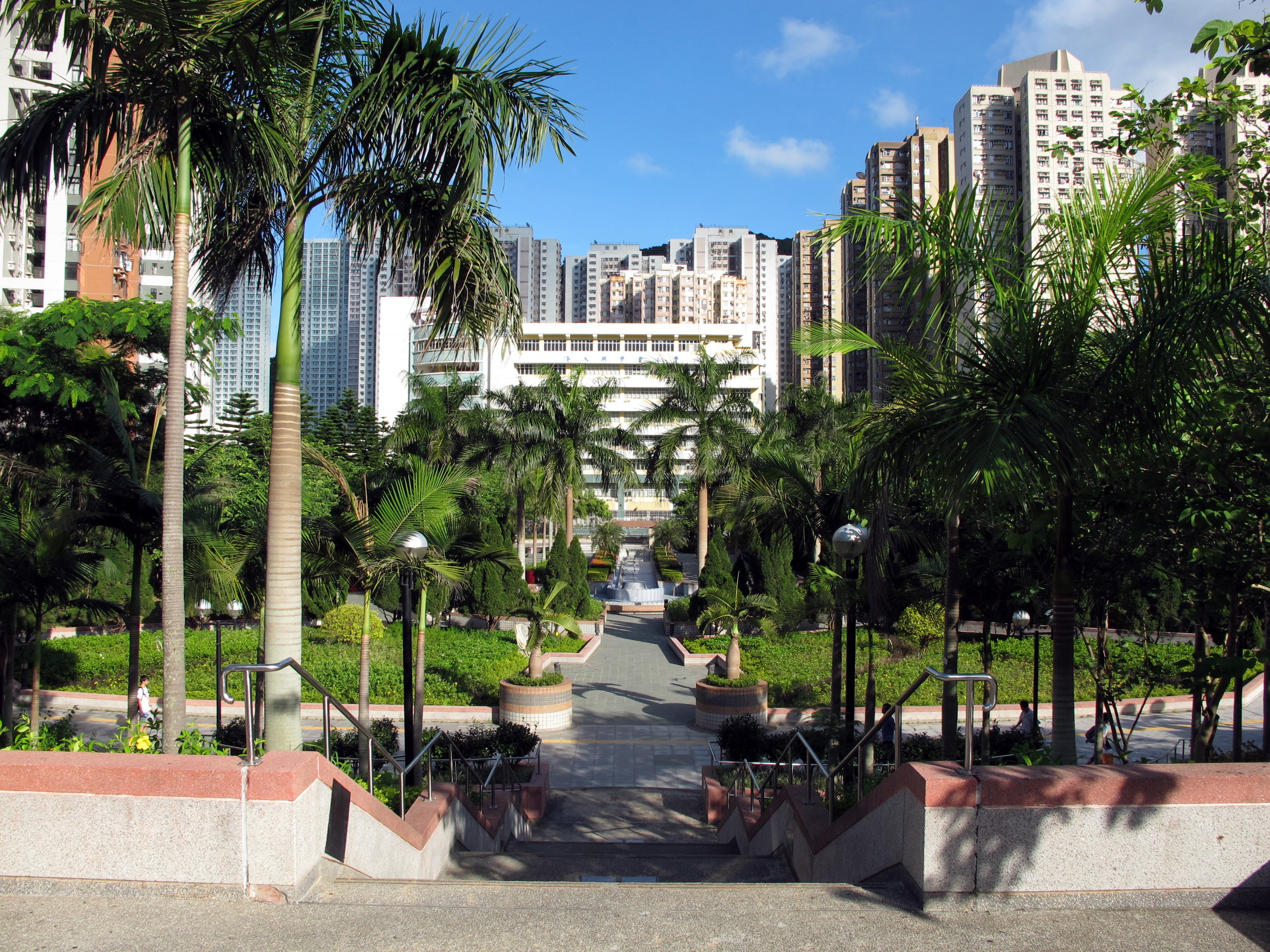
Terrace Garden in July 2010

Chai Wan Park (Chinese: 柴灣公園; pinyin: chái wān gōng yuán) is one of the largest parks in Hong Kong. Located in Chai Wan of Hong Kong near Chai Wan station, it occupies 6.55 hectares. Completed by Urban Council on 21 April 1993, the park is now managed by Leisure and Cultural Services Department, a department of Hong Kong Government.

== History ==
The park was the former site of Chaiwan Campsite of The Boy Scouts Association, Hong Kong Branch (present-day The Scout Association of Hong Kong) in 1929. The hill in the site thus known as Tung Kwan Shan (童軍山; 'Scout Hill') in Cantonese. In 1970, the Government decided to develop Chai Wan and the associate returned the site to the government and got a site in Tai Tam in exchange. The hill was demolished in the 1980s and the shore nearby was reclaimed for the construction of the park.

The park was opened on 21 April 1993.

== Facility ==
The park has a lily pond in the middle.

== See also ==
- List of urban public parks and gardens in Hong Kong
