= Chevalier International Holdings Ltd. =

- Traded as: SEHK: 25
- Industry: Property development
- Founded: 1970; 56 years ago
- Headquarters: Hong Kong
- Website: www.chevalier.com

Chevalier International Holdings Ltd. (Chinese: 其士國際) (SEHK: 25), is a property developer in Hong Kong.
