= Timeline of the 2019–2020 Hong Kong protests (May 2020) =

May events of the 2019–2020 pro-democracy demonstrations in Hong Kong

Timeline of the 2019–2020 Hong Kong protests
2019			March–June				July	August	September	October	November	December
2020	January	February	March	April	May	June	July	August	September	October	November	December
2021	January	February	March	April	May	June	July	August	September–November			December

The month of May in the 2019–2020 Hong Kong protests saw a resurgence of protests. This was partly due to the containment of the coronavirus pandemic, with a total of less than 50 newly reported cases, and a small uptick in cases at the end of the month. These were the first major protests erupting since early March. Tensions increased again as police employed heavy-handed tactics including towards minors and journalists.

The Hong Kong and Macao Affairs Office (HKMAO) issued aggressive statements about the protesters on 6 May. This was seen by pan-democrats and international observers as a sign that Beijing would increase its level of intervention in Hong Kong affairs; previously on 13 April, both the HKMAO and the Hong Kong Liaison Office had issued strongly worded statements regarding the stalling tactics of the democrats in the Legislative Council.

On 21 May, plans for the promulgation of a national security law for the city by the Chinese government became public. These plans were condemned by pan-democrats as hollowing out the semi-autonomous status of Hong Kong. The protest against the national security law on 24 May was one of the last street demonstrations of the 2019–2020 protests.

== Events ==
=== 1 May ===
An application by the Hong Kong Confederation of Trade Unions to hold its traditional Labour Day march was rejected by police due to the COVID-19 pandemic in the city, in spite of the HKCTU having pledged to adhere to physical distancing rules in force, such as marching in groups of four.

At least 1,500 shops and restaurants participated in an online campaign called "Hongkonger's 5.1 Golden Week", part of the yellow economic circle movement. Organizers said the campaign was intended to keep afloat businesses supportive of the pro-democracy movement, which had been hard-hit by the shortfall in the number of visitors from the mainland over the long May Day weekend due to the pandemic.

Some protesters initiated a "sing with you" event at 7:30 pm in the atrium of New Town Plaza. There were a large number of police cars and riot police on patrol outside the mall. Protesters already chanted slogans and displayed slogans on different floors at 7:30. However, several police officers of the Criminal Investigation Department entered the fourth floor and subdued nine citizens, causing dissatisfaction from bypassers. The policeman warned those present that they were insulting the police. The protesters in the atrium shouted slogans again, with the activities generally being peaceful. By 7:00 pm, nearly 500 riot police rushed into multiple floors of the mall and drove and subdued the protesters on the grounds of violating the "restriction order", causing the shops to shutter their entrances. The police's occupation of the shopping mall was criticized by the citizens and district board members as illegal and unreasonable. The police announced that 11 people had been issued a "restriction order" in the shopping centre throughout the day. Among them, a citizen known under the nickname "Domineering Brother" was twice charged by the police.

A spokesman for New Town Plaza said that the management office did not make the report to the police, emphasising that the police had full authority to enter the shopping centre to enforce the law. However, it did not respond to whether the police notified the person in charge of the mall before entering the scene.

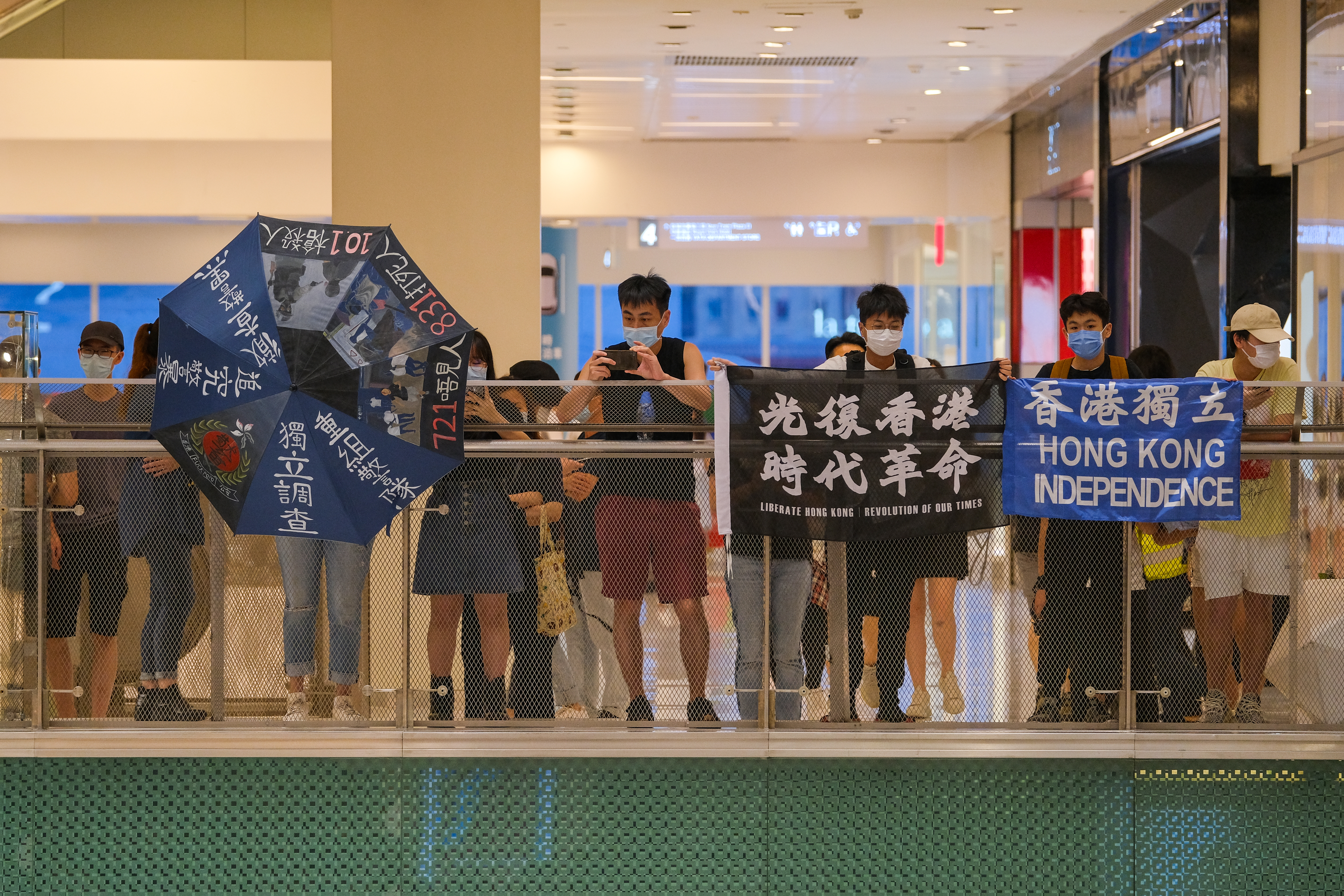
Protesters with banners and an umbrella calling for various things including Hong Kong independence

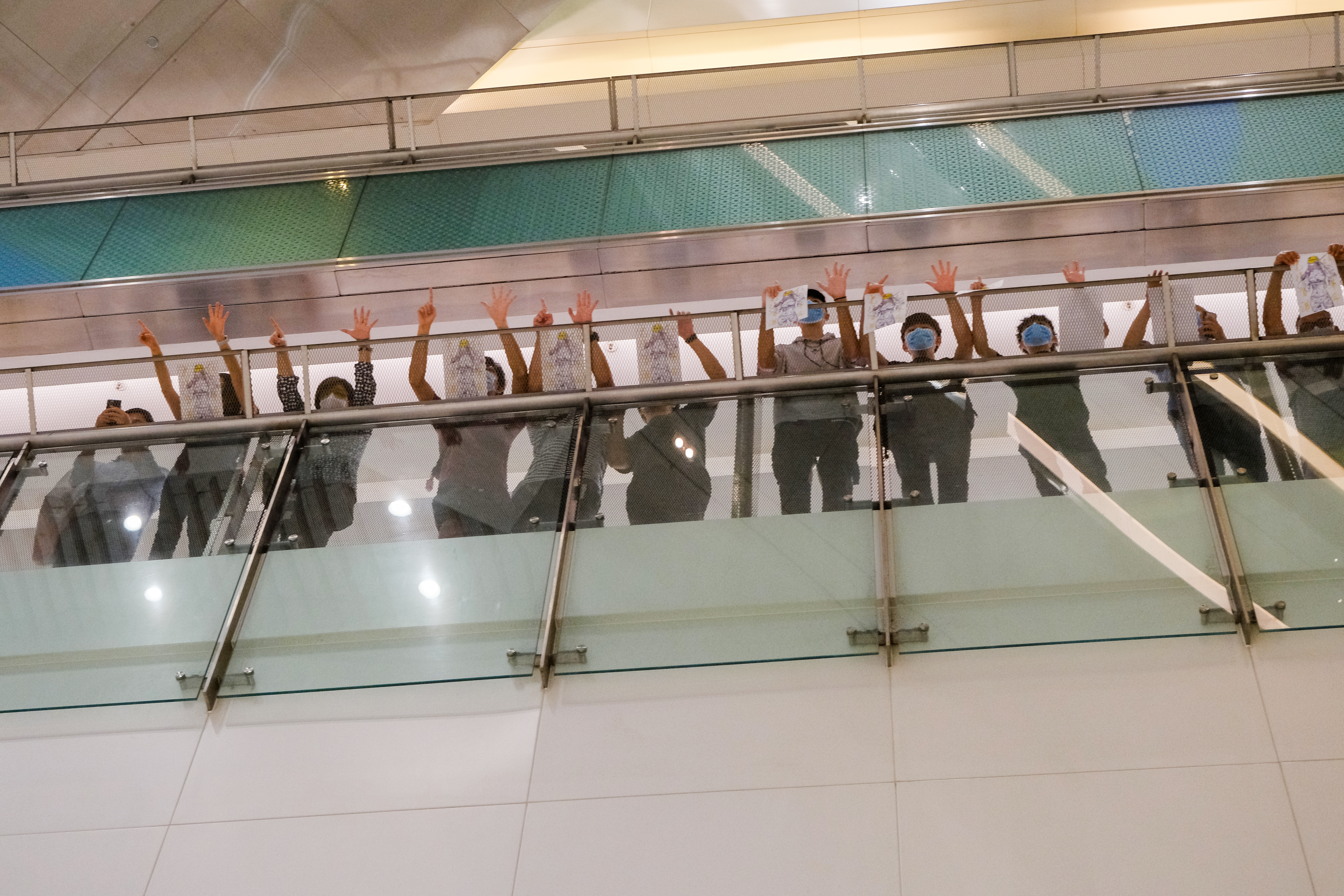
Protesters using hand signals to refer to the five demands

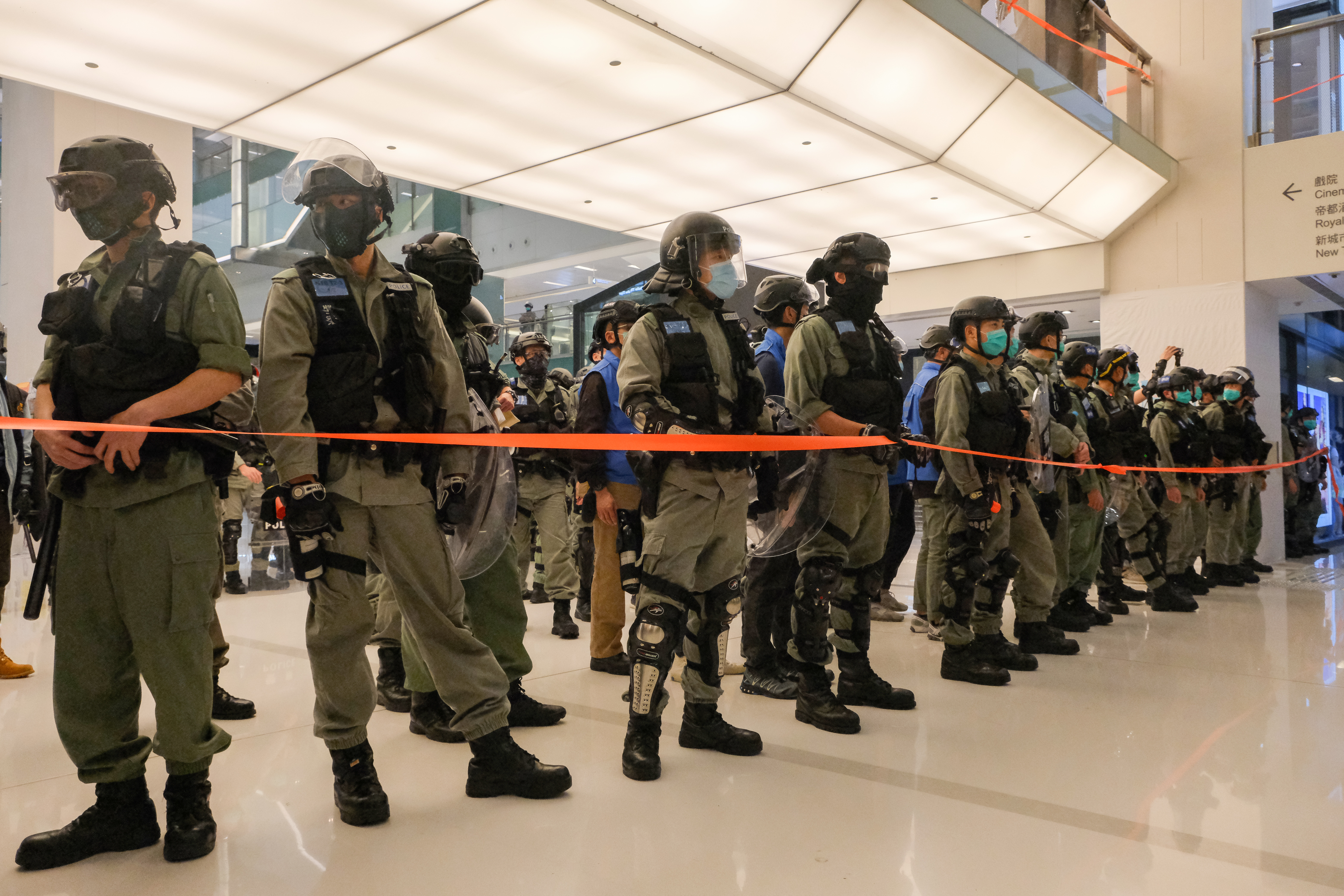
Police set up a cordon

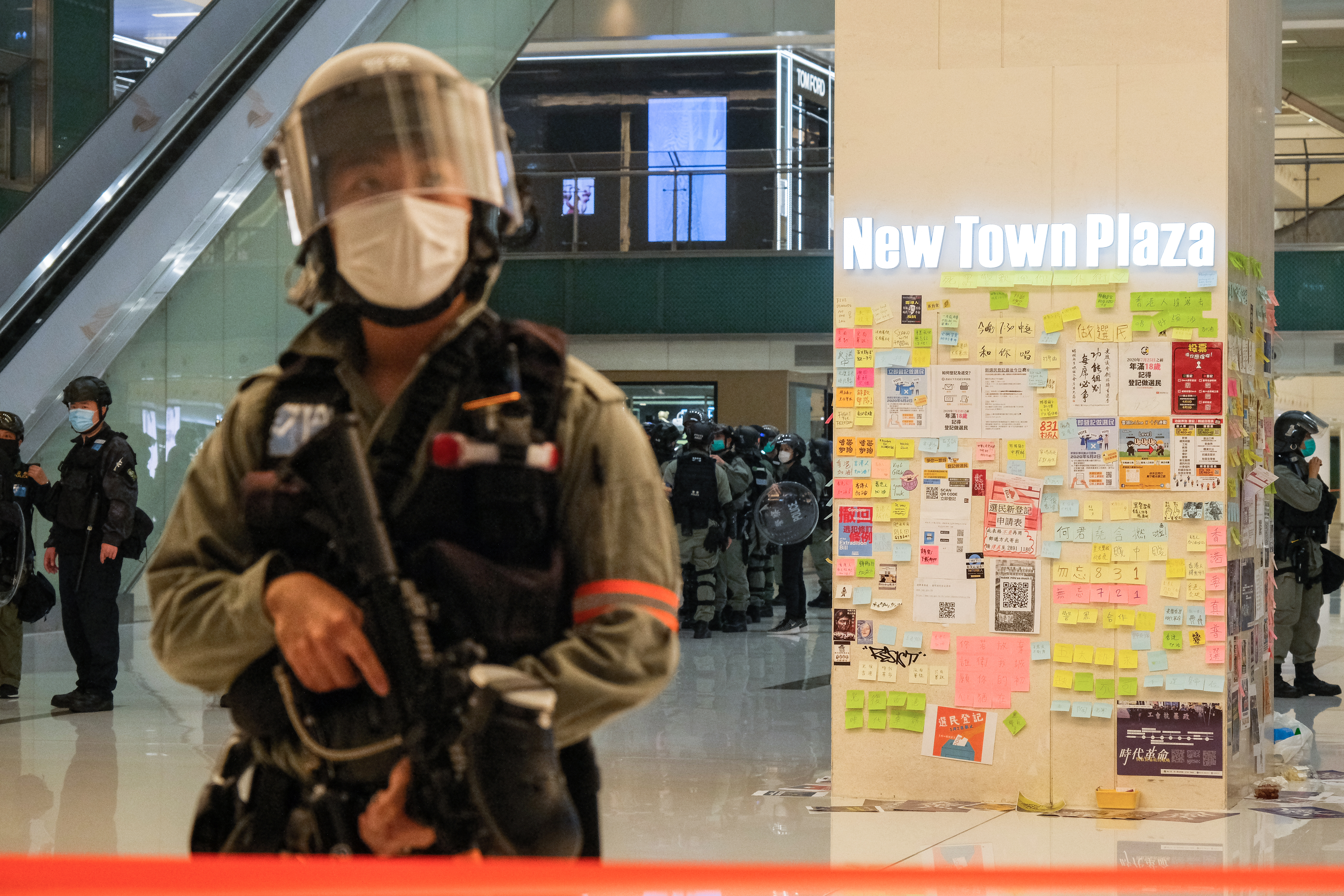
Lennon Wall on a column

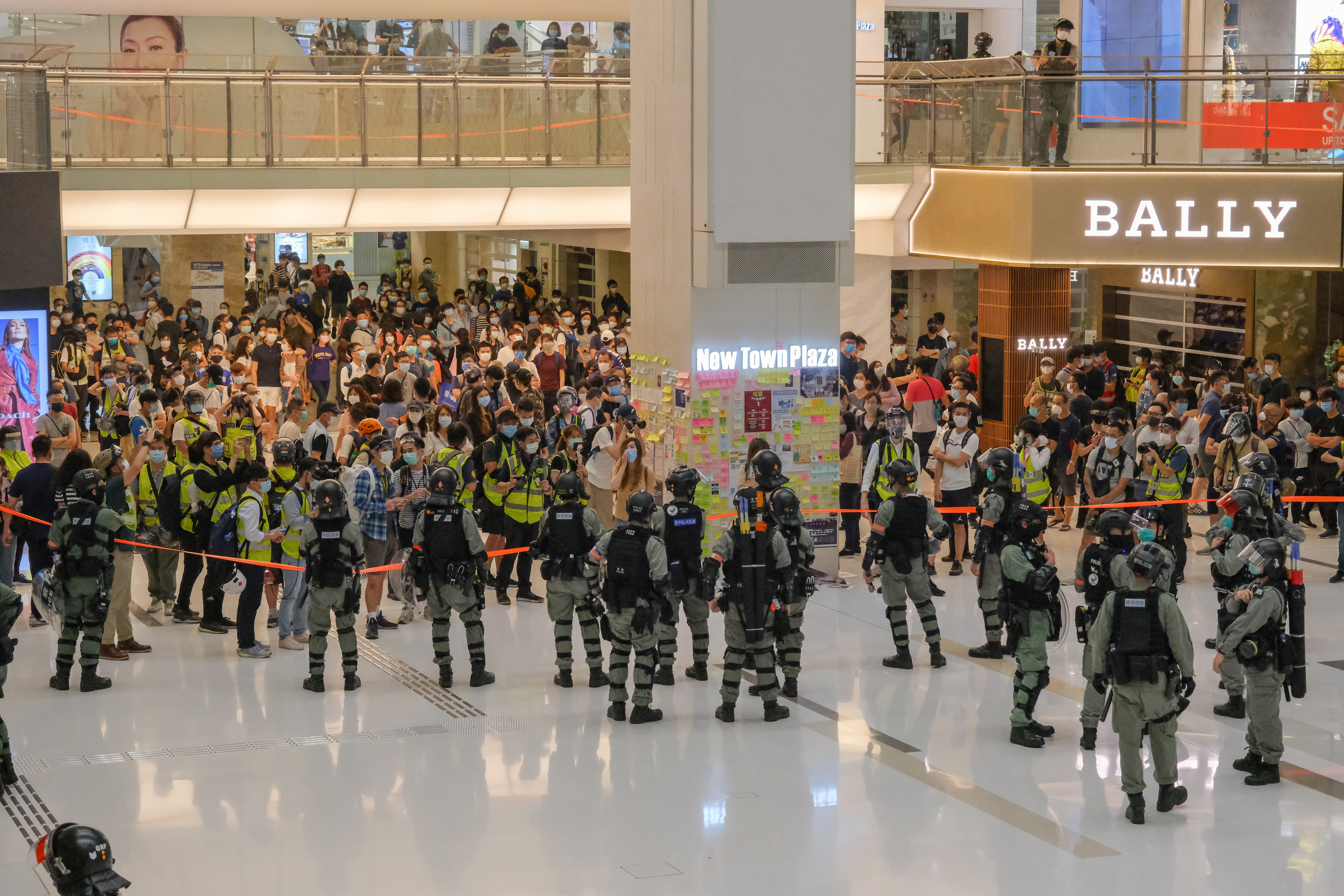
Another view of the Lennon Wall

=== 5 May ===
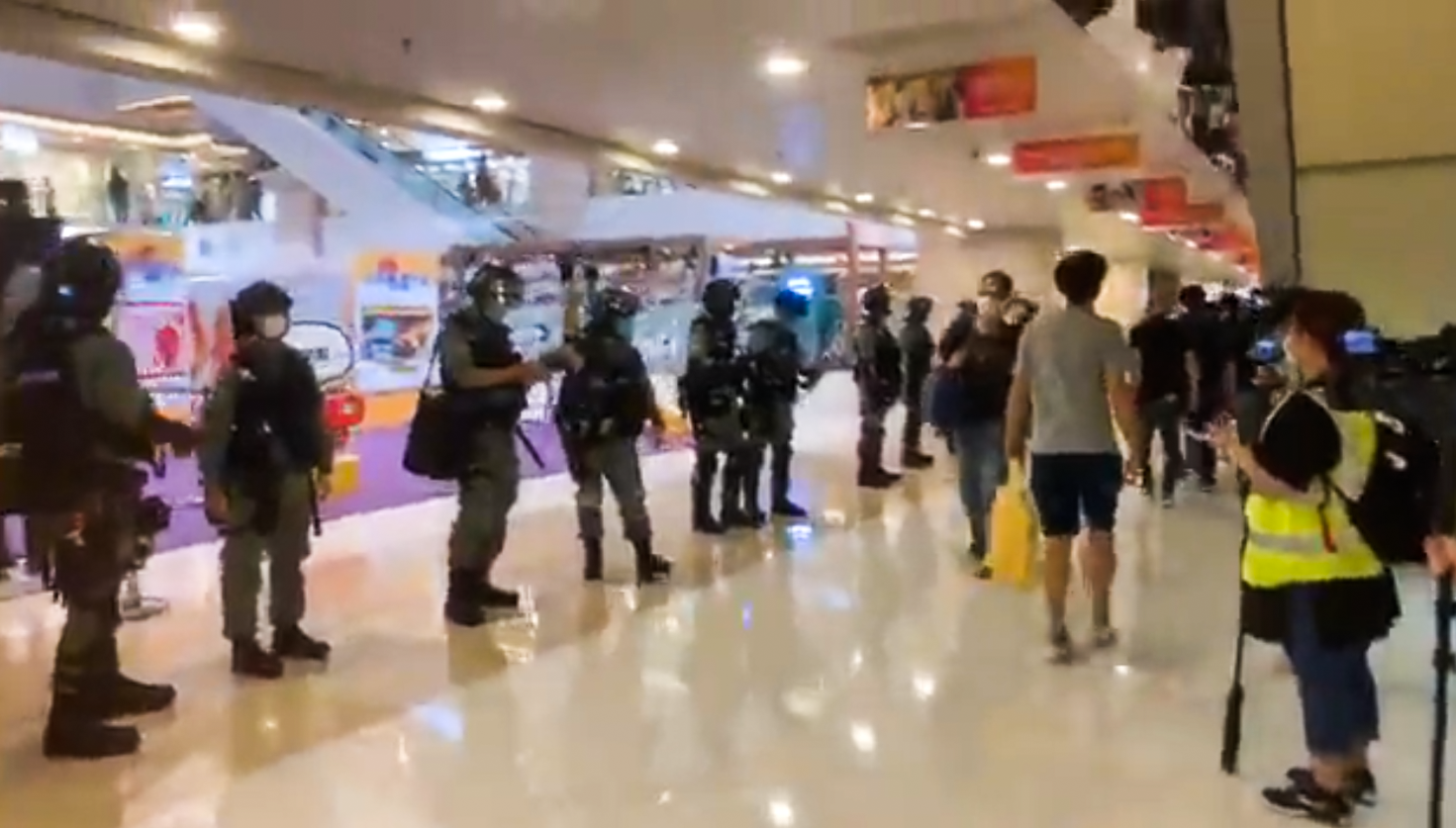
Riot police on standby

At about 7:00 pm, about 50 protesters started to sing "Glory to Hong Kong" at Tuen Mun Town Plaza. Before the event, a number of plainclothes policemen asked to see the identity cards of a number of citizens in the shopping mall atrium, and used a loudspeaker to call them to disperse. Then they pulled up a blockade on the top floor. By 7:27 pm, a large number of riot police officers entered multiple floors of the mall and pulled up the cordon. Some shops began to close. Police officers also used the mall broadcasting system to warn the public of violations of the "restriction order". At about 8:00 pm, the riot police withdrew to the outside of the mall and district councillors asked the police and security to explain the reasons for the closure. During this period, a plainclothes police officer was hit with a water bottle. Riot police entered the mall again to disperse the protesters. By 9:15 pm, several Tuen Mun district councillors including Tsang Chun-hing, Kawai Lee, Sam Cheung, and Alfred Lai Chun-wing were subdued by the police on the fourth floor platform. The district board member later said that after discovering that the police had broadcast in the mall, he asked the management staff to explain to the security control room on the 4th floor. At 9:45 pm, a boy holding a drink was suddenly subdued and stopped by multiple riot police officers. The blind lawyer Miss Lu was also taken into the blockade, causing public dissatisfaction. At 10 o'clock in the evening, riot police returned to the mall again, and 4 women and 1 man were subdued. During the operation, the police issued a ticket to 1 man and 5 women.

=== 6 May ===
The Hong Kong and Macao Affairs Office (the top Chinese political office responsible for Hong Kong) released a statement calling protesters a "political virus" and stating that while many in Hong Kong have sympathy for the protesters, "the more sympathisers the tyrants have, the greater price Hong Kong will pay". It also stated the Chinese government has responsibility for safeguarding Hong Kong against the threat. Some remarked the virus rhetoric seemed similar to Chinese communist party discourse regarding the mass detention of Uighurs.

In the evening, citizens started another "sing with you" event in the 1st atrium of +WOO (previously Kingswood Ginza mall). From about 6 o'clock in the evening, a large number of riot police officers were deployed in the area outside the mall. By 7 o'clock in the evening, participants were waiting in the shopping mall atrium and fence location, singing the song "Glory to Hong Kong" and shouting protest slogans. At about 7:30 in the evening, a number of uniformed police officers entered the mall and used the loudspeaker to warn the people gathered at the scene of the violation of the restraint order and demanded that they disperse peacefully within 20 minutes, otherwise they might be charged. After that, riot police officers entered the mall repeatedly, cordoned off the area, and charged four men and women for violating the restriction order. Some people charged were criticizing the police for arresting people and claimed they were being abused by police officers. District Councillor Lam Chun witnessed a protester being kicked by a riot police officer, as a result asked to see the commander to see what the protester did wrong, and was then arranged to take a witness statement at the police station.

=== 8 May ===
From about 12:30 a.m. to 1:00 a.m. in the early morning, there were about 20 people armed with knives, hammers and shovels trying to "clean up" a Lennon Wall on a bridge leading from Lok Fu Plaza to Wang Tau Hom Estate. A few people nearby tried to stop them by shouting at them and it became a conflict. The pedestrians were attacked. After a while, the police arrived but when the attackers tried to escape by taxi, the police didn't stop them. At the end, 10 people were arrested, including at least 3 being attacked. Three Wong Tai Sin District Councillors suspected that the police purposely let the attackers go.

During the lunch hour, some protesters gathered at IFC Mall, shouted slogans, and sang "Glory to Hong Kong". The police showed up, warned the protesters, and subsequently issued some HK$2,000 social distancing fines. Some journalists said they were pepper-sprayed by the police.

=== 9 May ===
At 7 pm, some protesters initiated a "sing with you" demonstration at Plaza Hollywood in Diamond Hill and Tai Po Mega Mall in Tai Po. At Plaza Hollywood, a large number of police vehicles were deployed, and dozens of riot and plainclothes police officers were stationed at the exit of the MTR station. The protesters gathered in the atrium of the mall to chant and sing slogans. By 7:30, a large number of riot police officers entered the mall, pulling cordon lines and dispersing the protesters in the atrium. Citizens waiting outside restaurants in the mall were also required to produce an identity document. Legislative Councillor Jeremy Tam, Wong Tai Sin and District Council Members Carmen Lau and Leung Ming-hong were on the scene observing the police. They were also stopped by police officers, pointing out that they and the people around them violated the restriction order. Tam said that they had only 6 people and that they did not know each other and had no common purpose. A middle-aged man in blue clothes was surrounded by police officers because he allegedly said, "There is no problem with black police buying white powder. Are there any problems with singing?". Riot police officers left the mall at 9 pm. By 10:30 in the evening, two men and a woman were suspected of being recognized in plain clothes and were stopped at the entrance of the shopping mall near Lung Poon Court. One of them was searched for the Liberate Hong Kong banner. After being stopped, the men and women were released and said that they suspected that they were the organizers of the event, and they did not rule out a "restriction order" ticket control based on the information later.

In Tai Po Mega Mall, many protesters gathered and chanted slogans in the atrium of Area C, while riot police officers patrolled outside the mall. By 7:37 pm, riot police entered the Tai Po Mega Mall to disperse the protesters and set up a blockade line. Some protesters walked to Tai Po Plaza to continue chanting slogans. Police officers at the flyover outside Tai Po Plaza warned people in the mall that they had violated the "restriction order". At 7:57 pm, when riot police abruptly rushed into Tai Po Plaza and there was a group of 5 people passing by the mall, two of them were stopped by a group of police officers and then taken away by the police. The police pushed and drove reporters off the scene. At 9 o'clock, the police stopped a number of young people at the footbridge leading to Sun Hing Garden in Tai Po Centre.

=== 10 May ===
Protests on this day were reported to be the largest in months, with 236 arrests in total, for offences including unlawful assembly and possession of weapons. An unauthorised march from Tsim Sha Tsui to Mong Kok was thwarted by heavy police presence. A 12-year-old boy and a 16-year-old girl, who were covering protesters gathering at Tsim Sha Tsui's Harbour City mall while wearing press vests, were briefly detained. Police later said that the pair had not been arrested and been released without charge or warning. Later, protests shifted to sing-along events at several shopping malls. Early in the afternoon, police were suspected to have fired a pepper ball inside MOKO Mall of Grand Century Place in Mong Kok to disperse protests. Later, some protesters attempted to set road blocks, with some debris set alight on Sai Yeung Choi Street South. At around 8 pm, over 100 riot police officers suddenly rushed the crowd at Sai Yeung Choi Street South and deployed pepper spray, hitting at least one person and several reporters. Among those arrested was Democratic lawmaker Roy Kwong, who was alleged to have thrown a water bottle at officers, an accusation that Kwong firmly denied. He was treated in Queen Elizabeth Hospital for neck injuries that he had sustained during his arrest.

The Hong Kong Journalists Association alleged that abuse and insults of reporters had taken place during the protests on that day, with HKJA chairman Chris Yeung Kin-hing stating that pepper-sprayed reporters had been denied immediate treatment and that, contrary to internal police guidelines, some reporters had their bags searched and been told to turn off their cameras. Separately, the HKJA also expressed shock at reports that two policemen had pepper-sprayed and subdued a female journalist who had filmed them arresting a woman in a public toilet that same night; in the incident, the journalist had briefly lost her consciousness. Having been arrested on site for obstructing the police, she was formally arrested on 6 November 2020.

A police statement released on 11 May urged against participation of reporters under the age of 18 at "high-risk" protest sites.

=== 12 May ===
At a district council meeting in Yuen Long, Hong Kong police chief Chris Tang said that the treatment of the press during a protest dispersal operation in Mong Kok on 10 May had been "undesirable", but stopped short of issuing an apology.

=== 14 May ===
Following online calls, protests were staged at shopping malls in several parts of the city. Besides the chanting of slogans and the singing of songs related to the movement, there were mock birthday celebrations for Chief Executive Carrie Lam. Most protests remained peaceful. At around 9 pm, in Shatin New Town Plaza, a black-clad protester was subdued by two plainclothes officers, one of whom sat on the man while pepper spraying surrounding journalists and citizens; later the man was taken away. Police published a statement on Facebook in which they accused the man of having been a "rioter" who had broken into a shop at the mall and damaged appliances. At around 10 pm, with tensions between the police and the crowds remaining high, police conducted stop-and-search actions, cordoned a landmark staircase near Sha Tin Town Hall, and took away two young males.

=== 16 May ===
Numerous 'Sing with You' activities were held at various malls, such as YOHO Mall in Yuen Long, Olympian City in Olympic, East Point City in Tseung Kwan O and New Town Plaza in Shatin. Riot police were stationed at multiple exits and junctions. Some protesters tampered with the ticket machine at Genki Sushi, a sushi chain owned by Maxim's Catering. Maxim's had previously drawn the ire of protesters through statements that Annie Wu, the daughter of one of the co-founders, had made at the United Nations Human Rights Council. They jammed the machine such that customers could not get tickets for queuing up. They also warned Starbucks diners not to consume there. Several arrests were made at Tseung Kwan O, where about 100 protesters had gathered.

=== 18 May ===
Starry Lee was re-elected House Committee chairwoman on 18 May after police removed most pro-democracy members due to violent scuffles before the vote was called. One pro-democracy lawmaker was injured in the process. The pro-democracy camp responded by not recognising her election.

=== 19 May ===
The Hong Kong Communications Authority ordered Radio Television Hong Kong (RTHK) to suspend productions of Headliner, a controversial yet popular news satire television program among Hong Kong citizens which criticises the police and government. The government stated that an episode aired on 14 February was "insulting" towards the Hong Kong Police Force.

=== 21 May ===
The Government of China proposed a new National Security Law for Hong Kong and the law could bypass Hong Kong lawmakers. The law would target terrorist activity and would prohibit acts like sedition, subversion and secession, as well as foreign interference in Hong Kong's affairs. The backlash on the bill was heavy and pro-democracy activists and pro democracy lawmakers like Joshua Wong and Dennis Kwok said it could be the end of One country, two systems. The United States Department of State warned China against imposing a national security law that did not "reflect the will" of the Hong Kong people.

=== 22 May ===
The new proposed National Security Law for Hong Kong was brought forward before the National People's Congress on its annual meeting. NPC spokesman Zhang Yesui said that safeguarding national security is fundamental for all Chinese people including people from Hong Kong. The law sparked strong rebukes from foreign governments. The governments of the United Kingdom, Australia and Canada said in a joined statement that they were "deeply concerned" about the new law. The U.S. Secretary of State Mike Pompeo said that he condemned the move and that it was going against the promise of a high degree of autonomy that China promised in the One country, two systems principle. The Chief Executive of Hong Kong Carrie Lam said that the law will not affect the freedoms that the people of Hong Kong enjoy and would not affect the judiciary system in Hong Kong. Scuffles broke out in the Legislative council when pro-democracy legislators protested against the proposed new law. The Hang Seng Index fell 5.6% on 22 May, its biggest loss since July 2015, as a result of the bill and fear of more unrest in the city. Other stock exchange indexes also felt the effect of the new law and dropped.

=== 24 May ===
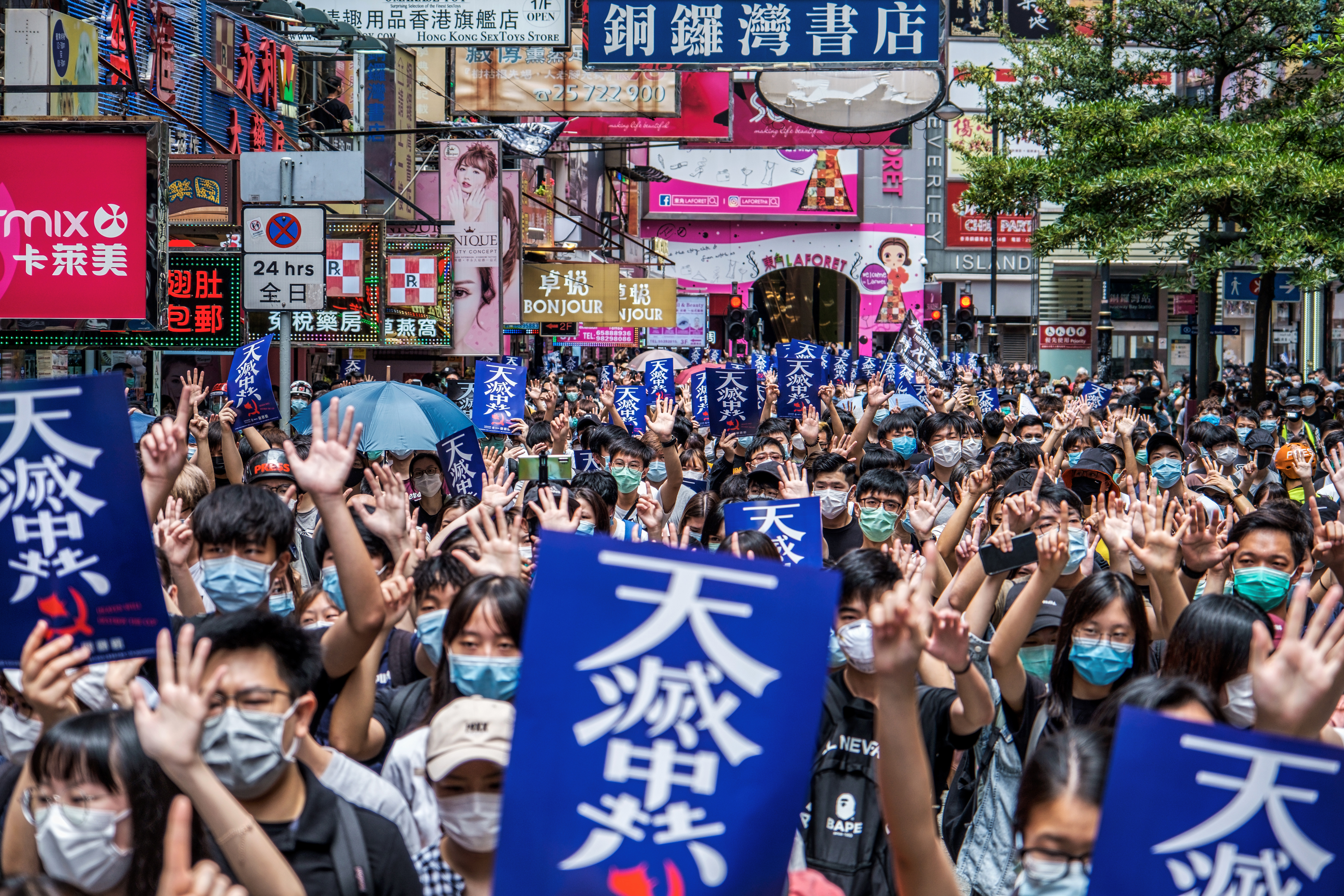
Demonstration on Lockhart Road, behind Sogo Department Store

The day saw the first notable protests since the COVID-19 pandemic, occurring in response to a proposed anti-sedition bill in China, of which the Chinese government said that once a decision is made, they will "implement it till the end". Hundreds of people marched at lunchtime in Causeway Bay and Wan Chai. A water cannon truck was used and volleys of tear gas were fired in a series of confrontations more radical protester blocked multiple roads – at least two people who objected to the roadblocks were severely assaulted by a black-clad group, broke traffic lights, set small fires and threw bricks, dug up from pavements, at police and vandalised shops such as I.T, whose founder Sham Ka Wai holds a stance supportive of the police. One riot police officer was seen taking a bottled drink off the fridge of convenience store Circle K without paying and leaving almost immediately, taking the drink out of the store, causing controversy. The Police Force later confirmed that they have helped the police officer pay for the drink after the news went viral. Ten people were sent to hospital, including a 51-year-old woman in critical condition who had suffered a panic attack. The other nine were either in a stable condition or later discharged from hospital. At least 180 people were arrested.

On 4 November 2022, four demonstrators were sentenced for wounding with intent, rioting and unlawful assembly to jail terms of up to two years and ten months. The four had belonged to a group of about 20 demonstrators who attacked a bypassing solicitor, and hit him with umbrellas, after he had said that police ought to arrest the protesters. In his sentencing, the judge took into account that the four expressed remorse for their actions and also considered what he called the "atmosphere in society" at the time of the protest.

=== 27 May ===
Ahead of the second reading of the National Anthem Bill, scheduled for 27 May, security was tightened around the Central Government Complex. Additional water barriers were erected, police checkpoints were established on surrounding footbridges, and a reported 3,500 police officers were mobilised. During the morning rush hour, police intercepted cars staging a slow-driving protest at the Cross-Harbour Tunnel.

The Legislative Council meeting began at 11:00 am. Public access to the Legislative Council viewing gallery was restricted. Members of the League of Social Democrats unfurled a banner and shouted slogans at Admiralty Centre, opposite the government complex, but were quickly dispersed by police. In Central, demonstrators gathered and chanted slogans, with some attempting to block streets. Simultaneously, protesters also gathered and chanted slogans at Hysan Place in Causeway Bay. Police responded in both areas, firing pepper balls (irritant-containing projectiles) and corralling civilians. Around 50 youth were corralled on the pavement outside Hysan Place, and were later taken away in police vans. Other protests occurred in shopping centres and in Mong Kok. The police said that 360 people were arrested.

As the coronavirus outbreak had largely subsided in Hong Kong, secondary Form Three to Form Five students returned to school on this day. Students in Tsuen Wan, Yuen Long, Shek Kip Mei, and other areas staged demonstrations in support of the protest movement.

The U.S. Secretary of State Mike Pompeo announced that the U.S. would withdraw Hong Kong's preferential trade and financial status as he notified Congress that the Trump administration no longer regards it as autonomous from mainland China. The EU said China must respect Hong Kong's autonomy. The president of Taiwan Tsai Ing-wen announced that Taiwan would implement measures to help the residents of Hong Kong.

=== 28 May ===
The National Security Law passed in the National People's Congress in China with 2878 votes for, 1 vote against, and 6 blank votes.

After this announcement, the UK government announced that it would extend the rights of BN(O) passport holders. This would mean that if the law were to be passed, BN(O) passport holders will get 12 months of visa-free travel in the UK along with the right to study and work.

The United States, the United Kingdom, Australia, and Canada published a joint statement, condemning Beijing for infringing human rights and the autonomy of Hong Kong citizens. A video conference meeting was conducted by the European Union to discuss the problems. The Ministry of Foreign Affairs of Japan also issued a statement that it was 'deeply concerned' with the situation and that it would pledge to stay connected to Hong Kong's development.

Tabloid-style newspaper Apple Daily, which has long been supporting the Pro-democracy protests, published on their top page of the daily newspaper asking readers and those concerned to write a letter to President of the United States of America Donald Trump to appeal for help.

On this day when Beijing passed the Hong Kong national security law, a 10-meter long vertical protest banner written entirely in English was found draping down Beacon Hill. The demand on the banner stated "Say No To Security Law".

=== 29 May ===
Australian university undergraduate Drew Pavlou, a student activist at the University of Queensland critical of the ties and connections of the university and the Chinese Communist Party and in support of the Hong Kong Protests, was expelled from the university due to undisclosed reasons. In addition, he expressed that he was threatened with consequences if he breached the confidentiality rule of the university. A student-elect at the university's senate, he stated that he would appeal to the High Court of Australia.

James Slack, spokesperson of British Prime Minister Boris Johnson, clarified that the UK have been searching for new 5G joint venture partners to reduce the influence of Chinese manufacturer Huawei.

This was the second day of the passing of the national security law. A second vertical protest banner relating to the security law was found on Devil's Peak of Kowloon. This vertical protest banner was about 30 meters long, and used Chinese and a derogatory variation on the character for "China" to protest the national security law.

=== 30 May ===
President of the United States Donald Trump stated in an announcement from the White House that the U.S. administration would eliminate all agreements that had set Hong Kong apart from mainland China. This was in response to the Beijing government "diminishing" Hong Kong's status through replacing the "One Country, Two Systems" principle enshrined in the Sino-British Joint Declaration by "One Country, One System", a course which Trump called a "tragedy for the people of Hong Kong, the people of China and indeed the people of the world". There would be changes made to extradition treaties and export controls on dual-use technologies. The U.S. and Britain raised attention at the UN Security Council over the controversial new law, angering Beijing. China responded by saying that any action harming internal affairs of China would be doomed.

Kenneth Lau, a current pro-government member of the Legislative Council of Hong Kong, representing Heung Yee Kuk, organised a press conference, voicing out support for the National People's Congress Decision on Hong Kong national security legislation. He expressed that The United States of America would not benefit from the restrictions and the anti-Chinese sentiment. He said that deported Chinese students from US educational institutions would enhance capital inflow in Hong Kong, helping the development of both Hong Kong and China.

Expert investor Lam Yat-Ming expressed that the United States-Hong Kong Policy Act would deter investors from investing in stocks and funds in the initial public offering.

=== 31 May ===
Former Governor of Hong Kong Chris Patten stated in an interview to Reuters, that China and Communist Party general secretary Xi Jinping risked a Cold War from the crackdown of Hong Kong, and that the latter would trigger a capital outflow and a brain drain from the city.

Dominic Raab, First Secretary of State of the United Kingdom, expressed in an interview from British broadcaster BBC that if China continued pushing the national security law, the United Kingdom would grant British National (Overseas) passport holders the right to immigrate to the United Kingdom.

Other current affairs commentators expressed that the Chinese Communist Party would make Hong Kong valueless and worthless. Demosistō expressed that there would be further details regarding Donald Trump's plan to further restrict Chinese influence in the coming one to two weeks.

Current Financial Secretary of Hong Kong Paul Chan opined that the Hong Kong Autonomy Act would not have an actual effect on Hong Kong. In an interview by the Global Times, a state-run tabloid newspaper deemed as the mouthpiece of the Chinese Communist Party, Chan stated that the Hong Kong Government had already closely examined Hong Kong's financial status and its safety of doing business and finance. He admitted that there would be an effect on restricting United States technologies to Hong Kong, but consumers could easily find alternatives imported from Japan and Europe.

Erick Tsang, Secretary of the Secretary for Constitutional and Mainland Affairs heavily suspected Trump of extreme policies in a radio interview. He also expressed that the restrictions imposed by the United States made them 'bullies', and he was not scared of being restricted and blacklisted. He also mocked Canada, stating that he would not go to Canada so that Canadian authorities would not have him arrested.

A public poll in Taiwan found that 60% of those interviewed supported the Taiwanese government in proposing legislation to provide refuge for asylum seekers from Hong Kong who have been adversely affected by the protests.

Mike Pompeo, Secretary of State of the United States, stated in a Fox News interview by Maria Bartiromo that China was using fake propaganda to spread hatred towards the US, to shift the attention towards the George Floyd protests and to divert attention from the National People's Congress Decision on Hong Kong national security legislation. Pompeo also criticised Russia, Iran and Zimbabwe of smearing the George Floyd protests.

Several peaceful protesters put flowers in Prince Edward station and Central and sat at a silent assembly at IFC. Riot police was heavily manned and stopped and searched pedestrians. A teenager sticking posters on the wall was arrested.

A huge 3x25m banner writing 'Devil Cop's Whole Family Dies' was found on Beacon Hill in Lei Yue Mun at 6 o'clock in the morning. Another 3x25m banner, in Beacon Hill, Cheung Sha Wan, was found, having the words 'the devil claws of massacre has extended to Hong Kong'. Firefighters eventually took away the two banners.
