= Wang Tau Hom =

Neighborhood in Hong Kong

Coordinates: 22.340649°N 114.186369°E

- Traditional Chinese: 橫頭磡
- Simplified Chinese: 横头磡
Transcriptions
Standard Mandarin
- Hanyu Pinyin: Héngtóukàn
Yue: Cantonese
- Jyutping: waang4 tau4 hung4

Wang Tau Hom (Chinese: 橫頭磡) is an area in mid-north New Kowloon of Hong Kong. A public housing estate, Wang Tau Hom Estate, is situated in the area. Administratively, it is part of Wong Tai Sin District.

The area is regarded as part of Lok Fu due to the nearby MTR station.

== Education ==
Wang Tau Hom is in Primary One Admission (POA) School Net 43. Within the school net are multiple aided schools (operated independently but funded with government money) and Wong Tai Sin Government Primary School.
