= Junction Road =

Junction Road may refer to:

- Junction Road, Hong Kong, a road in Kowloon, Hong Kong
- Junction Road, London, a section of the A400 road in Upper Holloway, north London
