= Wang Tau Hom Estate =

Housing estate in Kowloon, Hong Kong

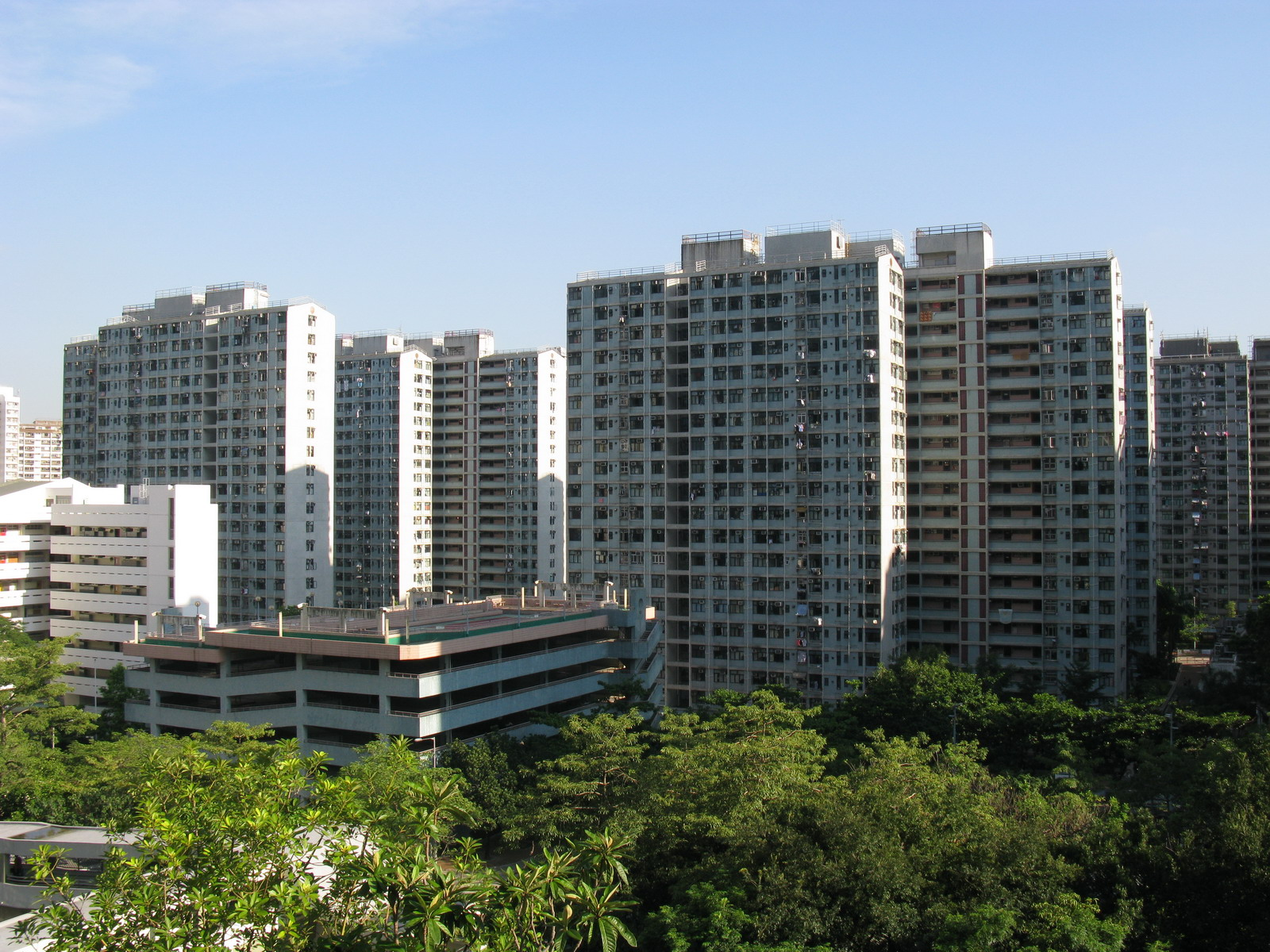
- Wang Tau Hom Estate
- Interactive map of Wang Tau Hom Estate

General information
- Location: 17 Fu Mei Street, Wang Tau Hom; Kowloon, Hong Kong
- Coordinates: 22.3408°N 114.1871°E
- Status: Completed
- Category: Public rental housing
- Population: 17,116 (2016)
- No. of blocks: 18
- No. of units: 5,900

Construction
- Authority: Hong Kong Housing Authority

Wang Tau Hom Estate
- Traditional Chinese: 橫頭磡邨
- Simplified Chinese: 横头磡村
Transcriptions
Standard Mandarin
- Hanyu Pinyin: Héngtóukàn Cūn
Yue: Cantonese
- Jyutping: waang4 tau4 hung4 cyun1

Wang Tau Hom Estate (Chinese: 橫頭磡邨) is a public housing estate in Wang Tau Hom, Wong Tai Sin, Kowloon, Hong Kong, along Lung Cheung Road and next to Lok Fu. The estate was originally built in 1962 with a total of 25 blocks, but it was redeveloped between 1982 and 1983. It now consists of 18 blocks of three types, namely, Double H, Harmony 3 and Linear L with Linear 1 and Linear 3, providing a total of 5,900 domestic flats. There were originally six more blocks, but these were allocated to Lok Fu Estate because they were near MTR Lok Fu station after its 1991 construction.

Fu Keung Court (富強苑), Ka Keung Court (嘉強苑) and Tak Keung Court (德強苑) are Home Ownership Scheme housing courts near Wang Tau Hom Estate. They have six, two and two blocks respectively, completed in 1991, 1998 and 2001 respectively.

== Houses ==
=== Wang Tau Hom Estate ===
Name	Type	Completion
Wang Fai House	Double H	1982
Wang Hin House	Linear L	1987
Wang Kwong House	Linear L	1987
Wang Chak House	Linear 1	1987
Wang Fu House	Linear 1	1987
Wang Hing House	Linear 1	1987
Wang Yip House	Linear 1	1989
Wang Kei House	Linear 1	1989
Wang Leung House	Linear 1	1990
Wang Chiu House	Linear 1	1990
Wang Chung House	Linear 1	1990
Wang Hau House	Linear 1	1990
Wang On House	Linear 1	1988
Wang Tak House	Linear 3	1988
Wang Yiu House	Harmony 3	1994
Wang Lai House	Harmony 3	1994
Wang Cho House	Harmony 3	1994
Wang Wai House	Harmony 3	1994

=== Fu Keung Court ===
Name	Type	Completion
Fu Yue House	NCB (Ver.1984)	1991
Fu Ning House	NCB (Ver.1984)	1991
Fu Hong House	NCB (Ver.1984)	1991
Fu Wo House	NCB (Ver.1984)	1991
Fu Yat House	NCB (Ver.1984)	1991
Fu Nga House	NCB (Ver.1984)	1991

Fu Keung Court is in Primary One Admission (POA) School Net 43. Within the school net are multiple aided schools (operated independently but funded with government money) and Wong Tai Sin Government Primary School.

=== Ka Keung Court ===
Name	Type	Completion
Ka Wui House	NCB (Ver.1984)	1998
Ka Ying House	NCB (Ver.1984)	1998

=== Tak Keung Court ===
Name	Type	Completion
Tak Yin House	NCB (Ver.1984)	2001
Tak Wah House	NCB (Ver.1984)	2001

== Demographics ==
According to the 2016 by-census, Wang Tau Hom Estate had a population of 17,116. The median age was 47.5 and the majority of residents (97 per cent) were of Chinese ethnicity. The average household size was three people. The median monthly household income of all households (i.e. including both economically active and inactive households) was HK$20,500.

== See also ==
- List of public housing estates in Hong Kong
- Lok Fu Estate
- Public housing in Hong Kong
