= Wing Kwong Pentecostal Holiness Church =

Church in Lok Fu, Hong Kong

Coordinates: 22.336121°N 114.189467°E

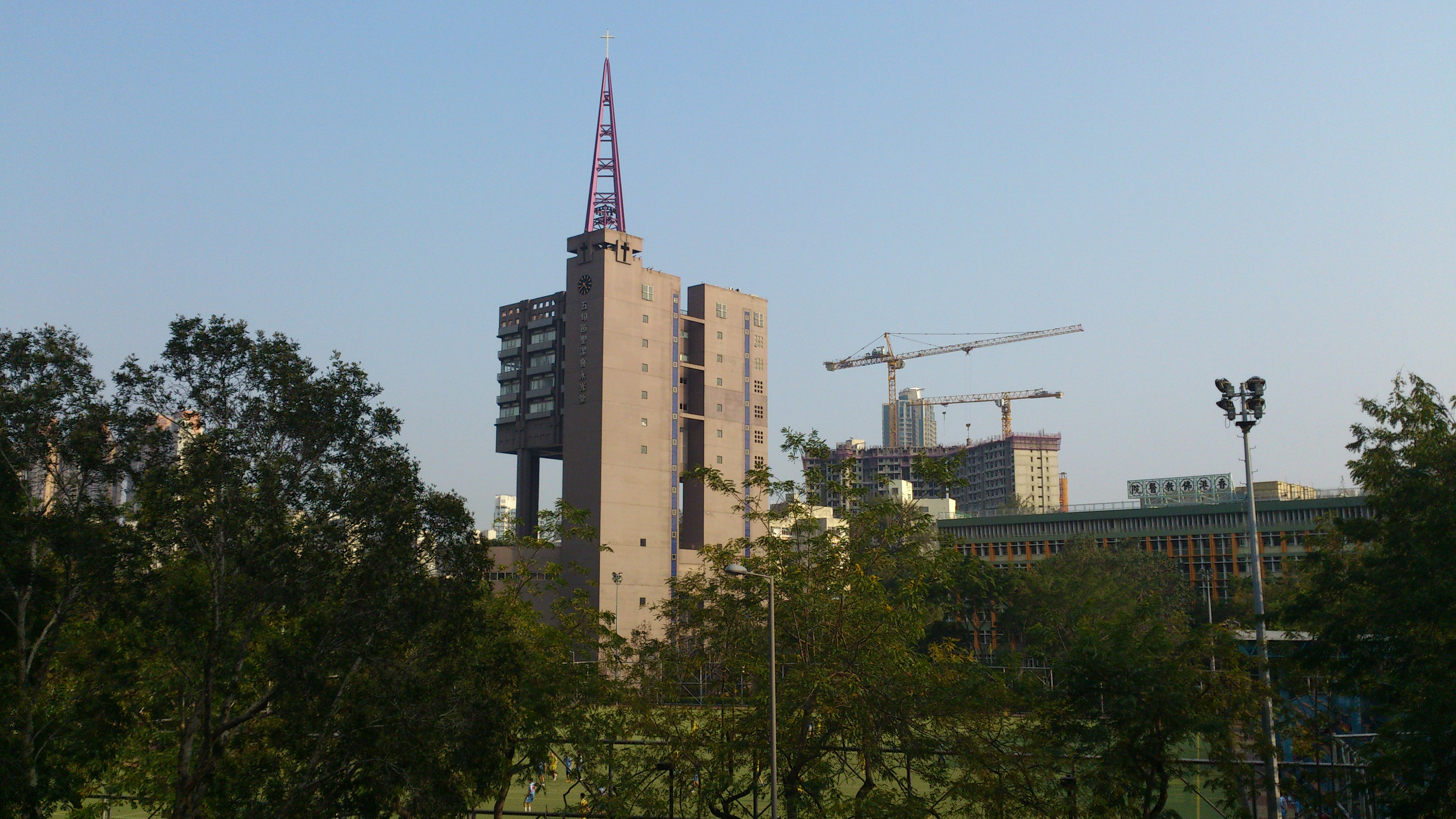
Wing Kwong Pentecostal Holiness Church

Wing Kwong Pentecostal Holiness Church (Chinese: 五旬節聖潔會永光堂) is a Pentecostal megachurch located at 22 Heng Lam Street, in Lok Fu, Wong Tai Sin District, Hong Kong. It is affiliated with the International Pentecostal Holiness Church.

== History ==
The church was founded in 1977 in Hong Kong. In 2000, it made the dedication of a new building including designed by TaoHo Design. The building stands 60 meters tall with a 45-meter spire on the roof, giving the structure a total height of 105 meters. In 2023, the church would have 6,000 members.

== Design ==
The church design won a Certificate of Merit of the Hong Kong Institute of Architects in 2000.
