= Lok Fu =

Area of Kowloon, Hong Kong

- Traditional Chinese: 樂富
- Simplified Chinese: 乐富
Transcriptions
Standard Mandarin
- Hanyu Pinyin: Lè Fù
Yue: Cantonese
- Jyutping: lok6 fu3

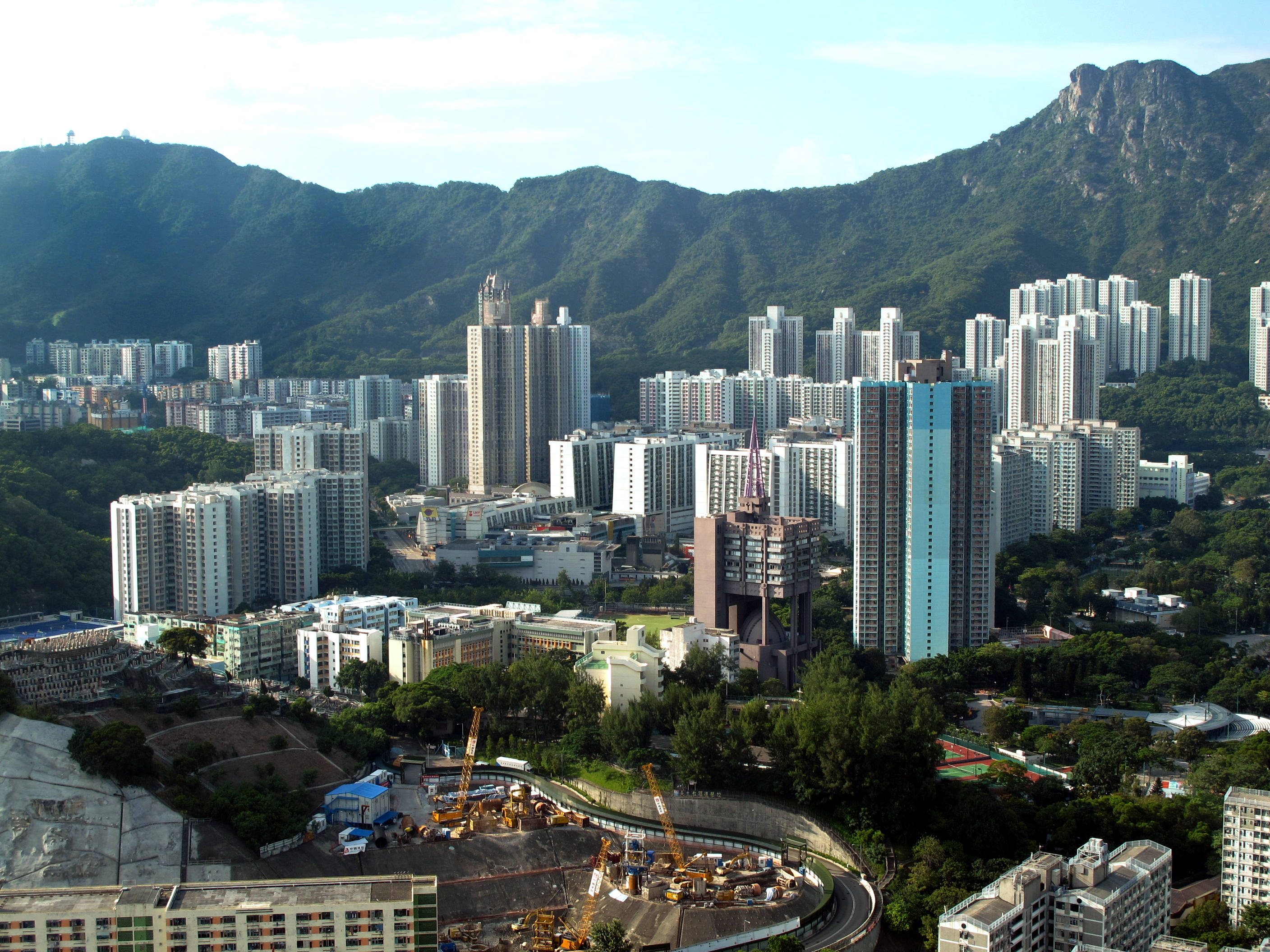
View of Lok Fu.

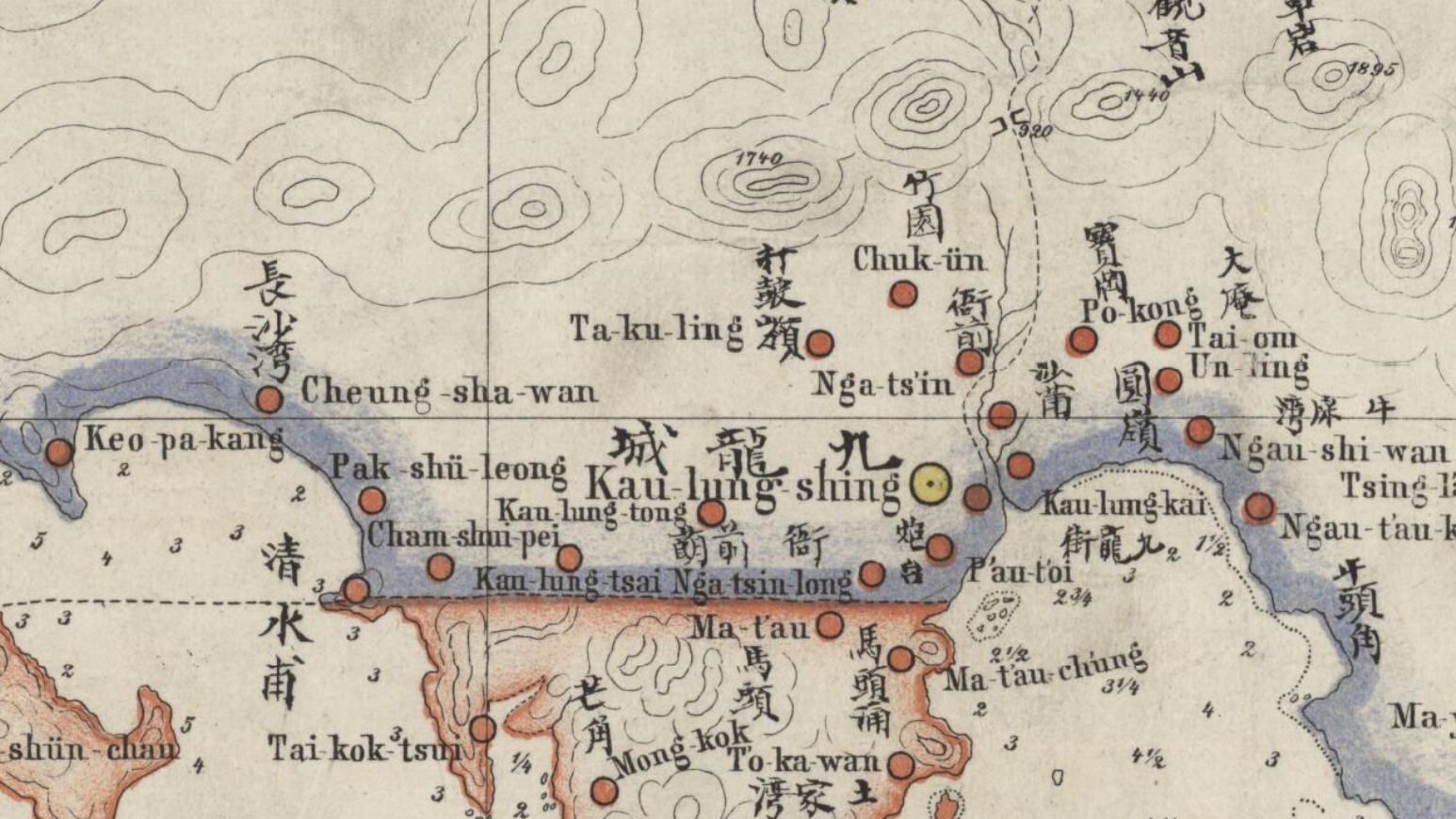
Ta Ku Ling (打鼓嶺) to the north of the border on the "Map of the San-On District" by Simeone Volonteri (1866). (New Kowloon along with the rest of the New Territories remained part of San-On County of Kwangtung Province until 1898.)

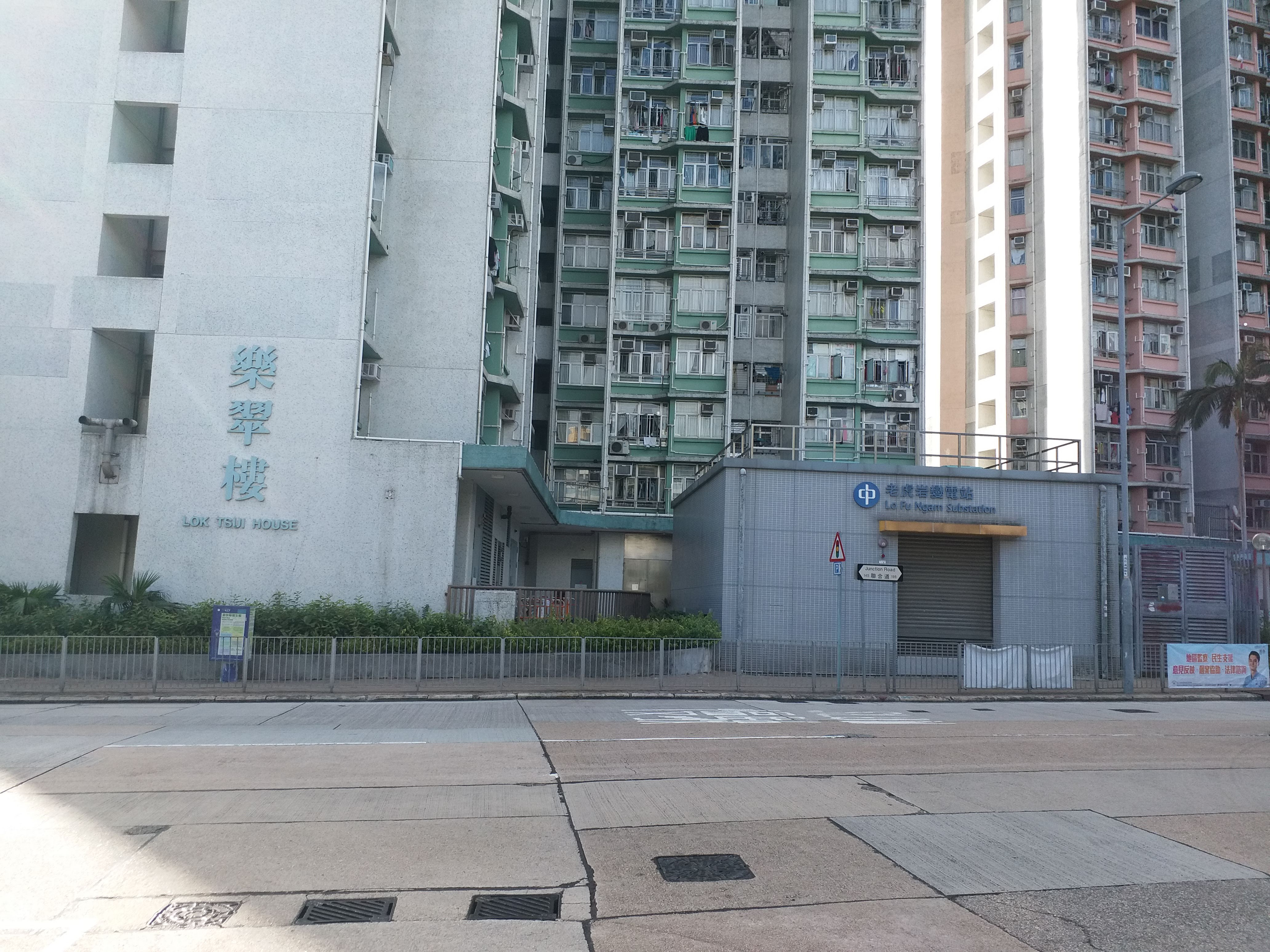
A power substation of CLP Power in Lok Fu is still named as "Lo Fu Ngam" nowadays.

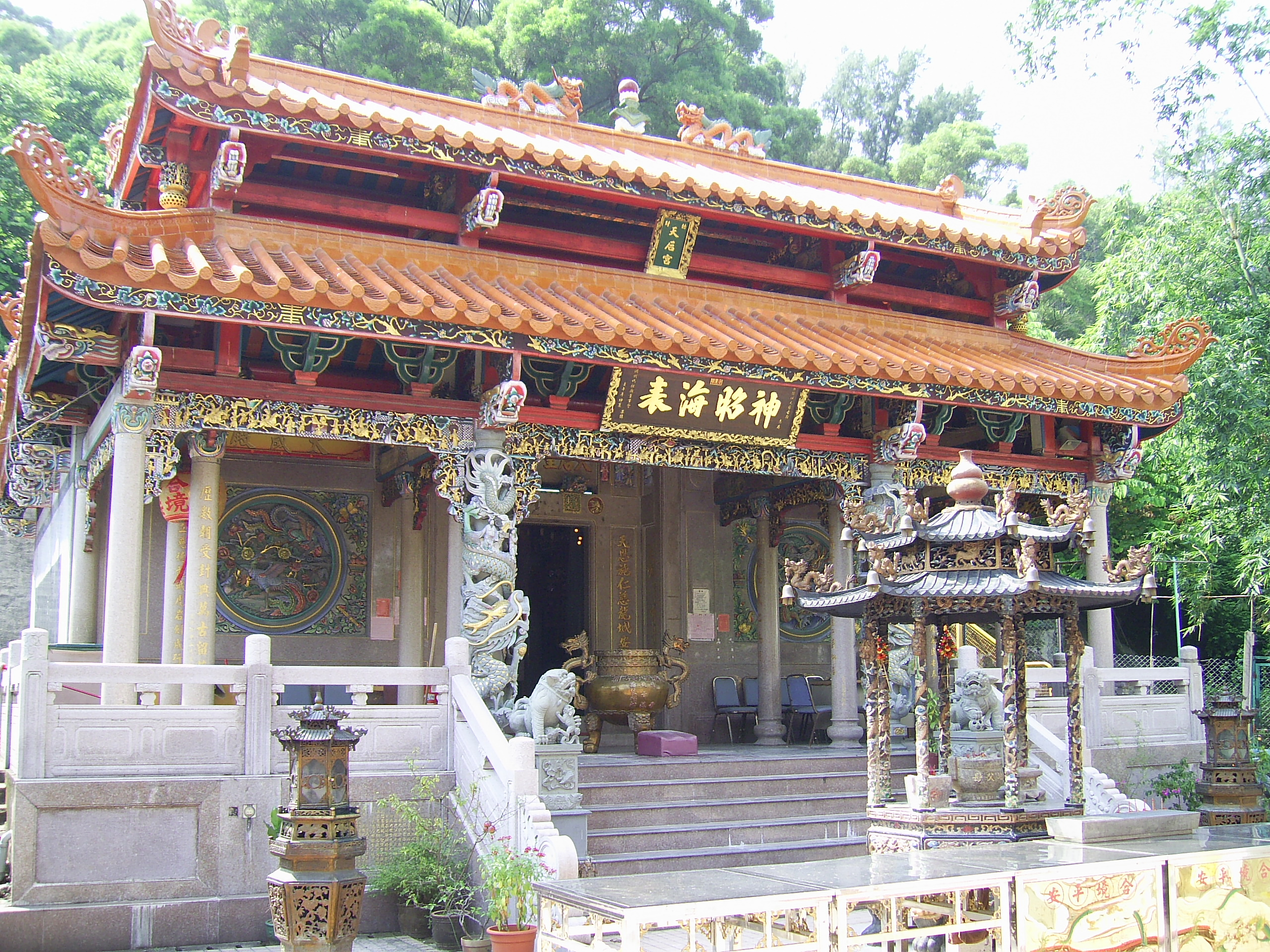
Lok Fu Tin Hau Temple.

Lok Fu (Chinese: 樂富; Cantonese Yale: Lohk Fu) is a place in Wong Tai Sin District, Kowloon, Hong Kong. It is located to the east of Kowloon Tsai, the west of Wong Tai Sin and the north of Kowloon City. It geographically includes nearby Wang Tau Hom.

== History ==
The only village in this area in the 19th century was Ta Ku Ling or Ta Kwu Ling (Chinese: 打鼓嶺), not to be confused with the other two villages of the same name in Hong Kong (Ta Ku Ling in Sai Kung district and Ta Kwu Ling in North district). It is recorded on an 1866 map and was part of an alliance of seven nearby villages led by Nga Tsin Wai Tsuen. It was located where Morse Park is now.

In the 1940s many refugees arrived in the area, which was then known as Lo Fu Ngam (Chinese: 老虎岩; Cantonese Yale: Lóuh Fú Ngàahm, literally "Tiger's Den" in Chinese). There were many squatter huts on the hillsides. After the construction of the public housing estate started in 1957 with the first resettlement blocks being built, Lo Fu Ngam was renamed as Lok Fu which literally means "Happiness and Wealth" in Chinese. All the housing estates were rebuilt in the 1980s and 1990s. Wang Tau Hom complex (now Lok Fu Place), built in 1985, was designed by the architects Alan Fitch (architect of Hong Kong City Hall) & W.N. Chung (architect of the 1971 (now replaced) Peak Tower).

== Features ==
The centre of Lok Fu contains the Lok Fu Place shopping centre. The shopping mall was renovated in 2008-9 while the market was renovated in 2013. The anchor tenant of the shopping mall is the Japanese department store UNY.

Besides the shopping mall, Lok Fu primarily consists of public housing estates:

- Lok Fu Estate
- Wang Tau Hom Estate

The Lok Fu area has many parks:

- Morse Park sections 3 and 4 separate Lok Fu from, respectively, Wong Tai Sin and Tung Tau Estate
- Junction Road Park (聯合道公園) - housing 6 tennis courts, a 7-a-side soccer pitch, 2 basketball courts, jogging track, pebble walking trail, children's playground and fitness equipment for the elderly
- Lok Fu Park (樂富公園) - a wooded, hilly area between Junction Road Park and Kowloon Tsai Park
- Lok Fu Service Reservoir Rest Garden (樂富配水庫休憩花園) - a large lawn located on a hill, adjacent to Lok Fu Park and Kowloon Tsai Park; to the south of the garden is Checkerboard Hill
- Lok Fu Recreation Ground (樂富遊樂場) - with an 11-a-side soccer/hockey pitch

Other places of interest in Lok Fu include:

- Lok Fu Tin Hau Temple (慈德社天后古廟 or 老虎岩(樂富)天后聖母古廟)
- Wing Kwong Pentecostal Holiness Church
- Hong Kong Buddhist Hospital

== Transport ==
Lok Fu is served by Lok Fu station on the MTR's Kwun Tong line.

Junction Road passes through Lok Fu.

== Education ==
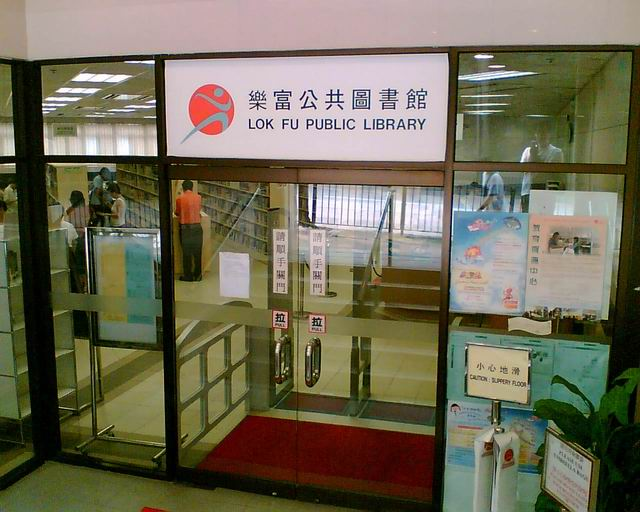
Lok Fu Public Library

Lok Fu is in Primary One Admission (POA) School Net 43. Within the school net are multiple aided schools (operated independently but funded with government money) and Wong Tai Sin Government Primary School.

Hong Kong Public Libraries maintains the Lok Fu Public Library in Lok Fu Place.
