= Lok Fu Estate =

Housing estate in Kowloon, Hong Kong

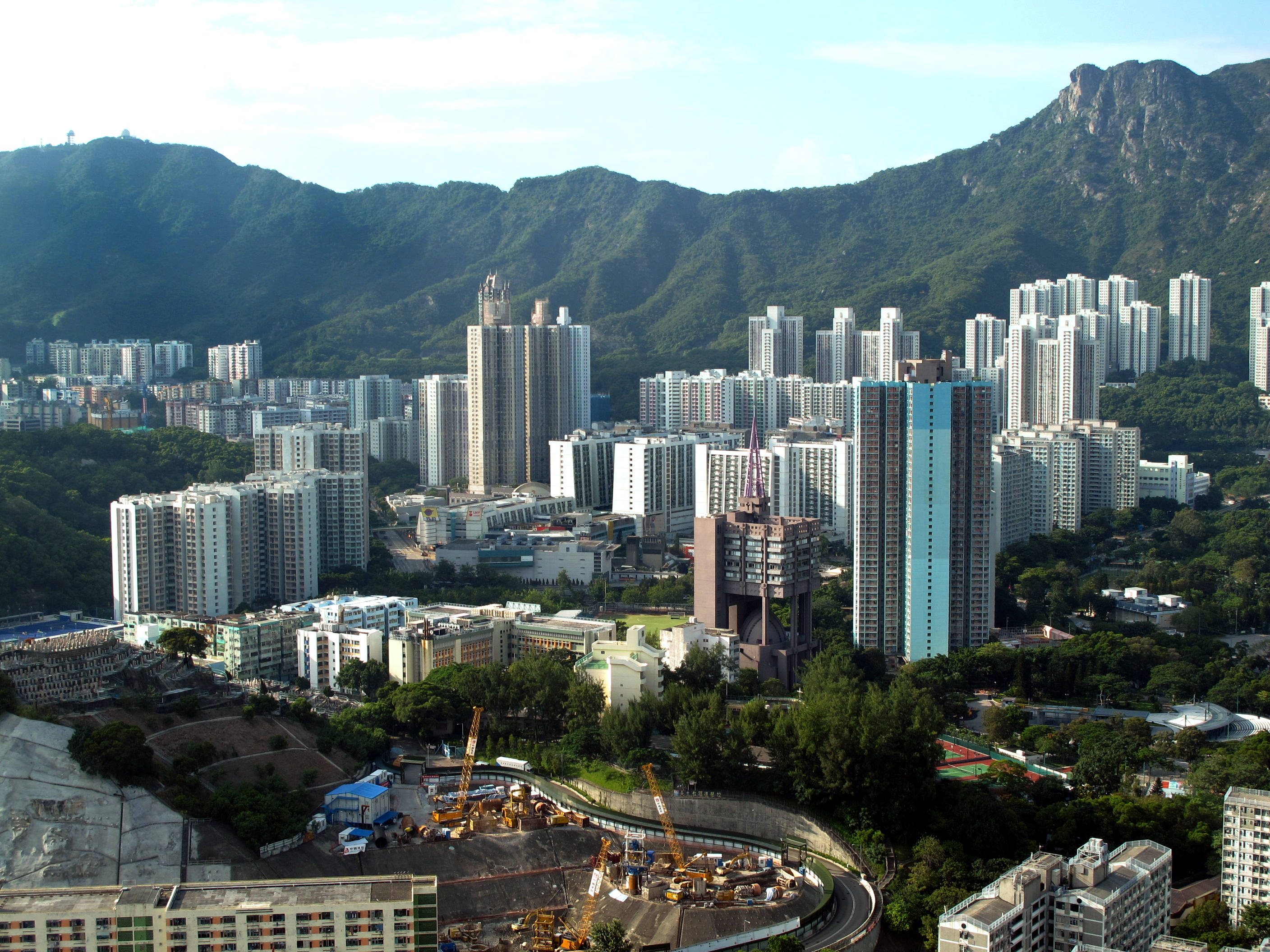
- Lok Fu Estate in 2010.
- Interactive map of Lok Fu Estate

General information
- Location: 198 Junction Road, Lok Fu; Kowloon, Hong Kong
- Coordinates: 22.3361°N 114.1868°E
- Status: Completed
- Category: Public rental housing
- Area: 12.2–57.7 m^{2} (131–621 ft^{2})
- Population: 9,700
- No. of blocks: 11
- No. of units: 3,700

Construction
- Constructed: 1957; 69 years ago, 1961; 65 years ago (original), 1984; 42 years ago (current)
- Authority: Hong Kong Housing Authority

Hong Keung Court
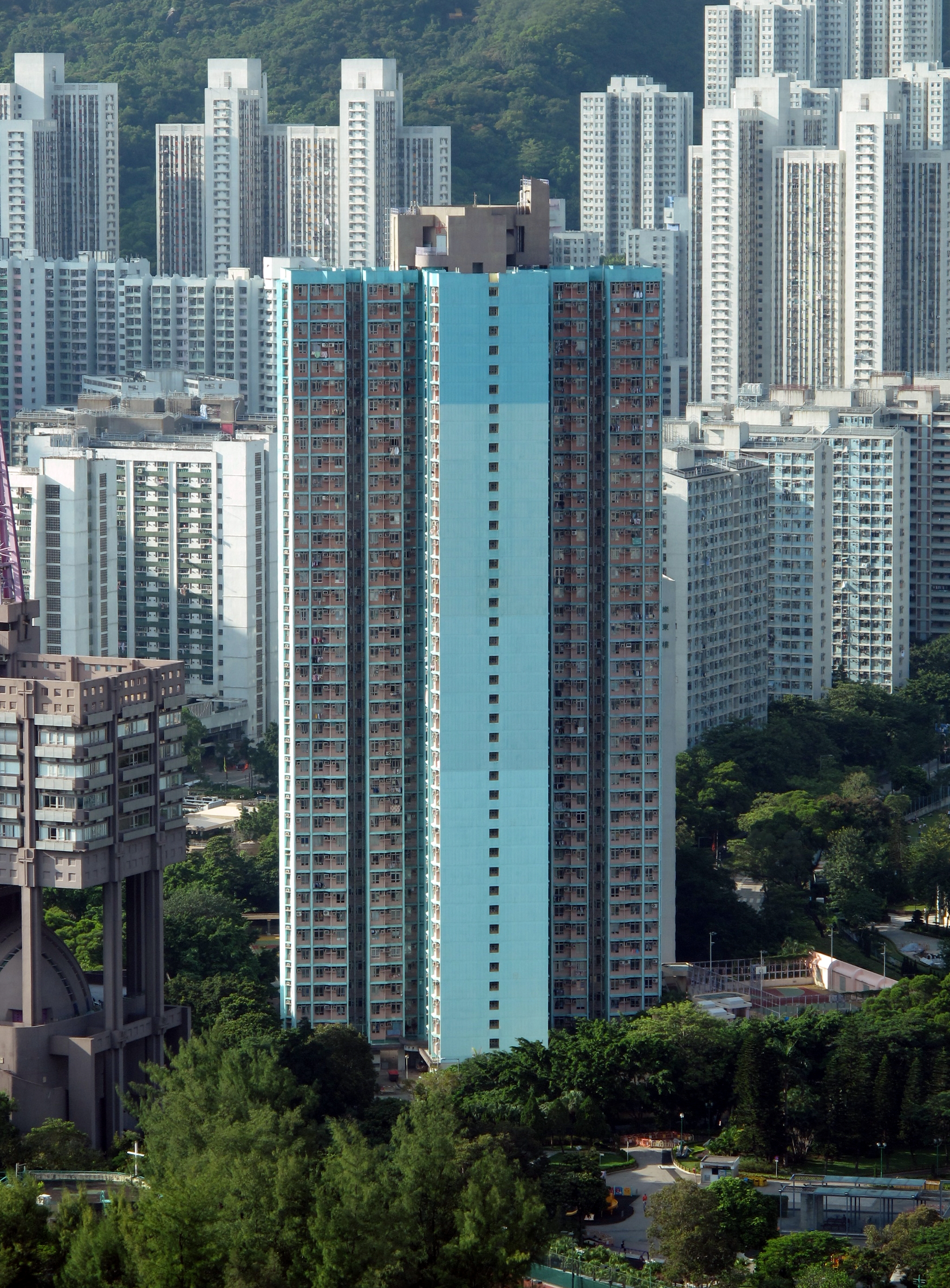
- Hong Keung Court in 2010.
- Interactive map of Hong Keung Court

General information
- Location: 23 Heng Lam Street, Lok Fu; Kowloon, Hong Kong
- Coordinates: 22.3361°N 114.1868°E
- Status: Completed
- Category: Home Ownership Scheme court
- Area: 53–80 m^{2} (570–860 sq ft^{2}), 39–60 m^{2} (420–650 ft^{2})
- No. of blocks: 1
- No. of units: 640

Construction
- Constructed: 1999; 27 years ago
- Authority: Hong Kong Housing Authority

Lok Fu Estate
- Traditional Chinese: 樂富邨
- Simplified Chinese: 乐富邨
- Cantonese Yale: lohk fu chyūn
- Literal meaning: happy and rich estate
Transcriptions
Standard Mandarin
- Hanyu Pinyin: Lèfù Cūn
Yue: Cantonese
- Yale Romanization: lohk fu chyūn
- Jyutping: lok6 fu3 cyun1

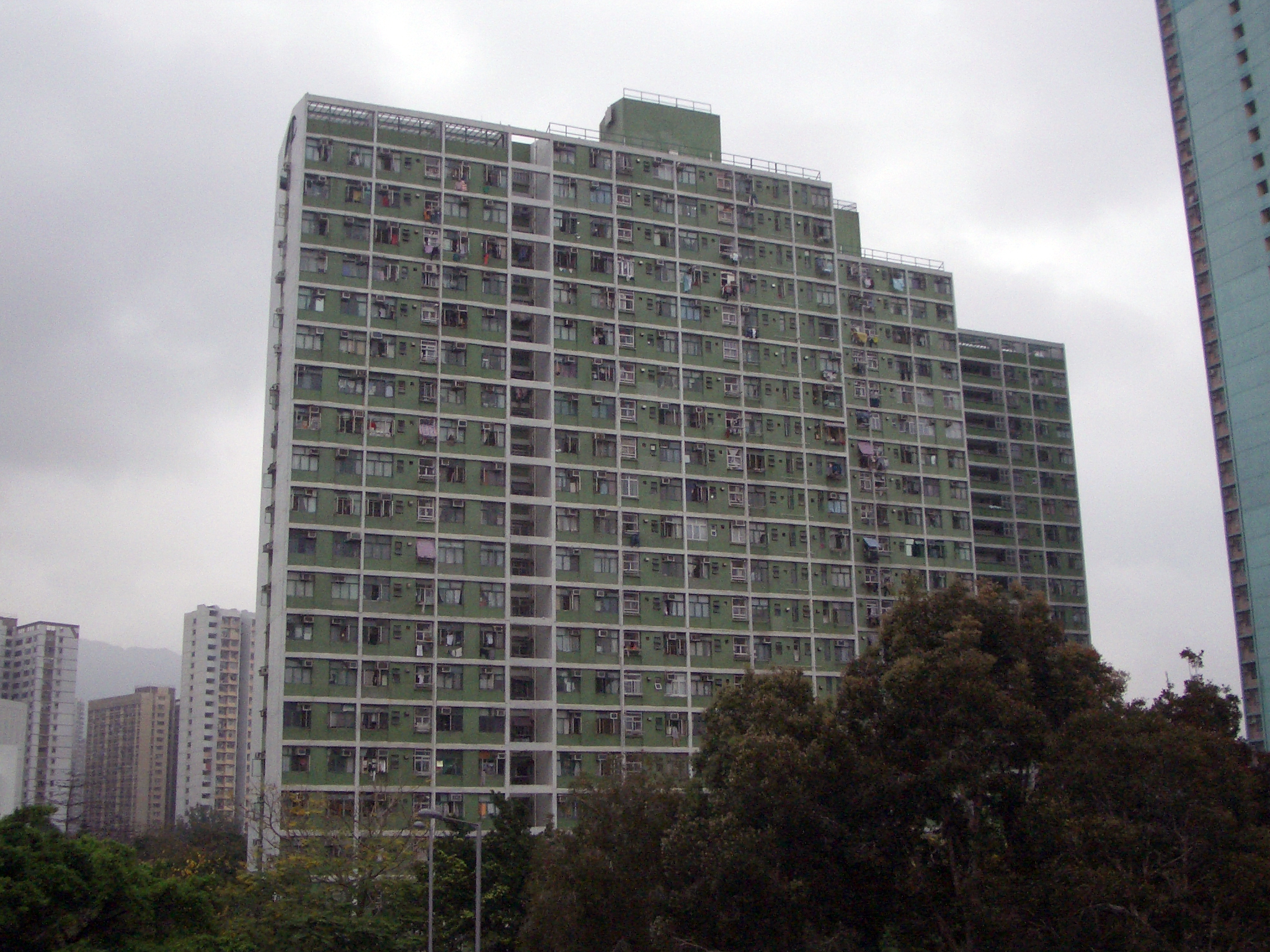
Lok Tung House, Lok Fu Estate

Lok Fu Estate (Chinese: 樂富邨) is a public housing estate in Lok Fu, Wong Tai Sin District, Kowloon, Hong Kong, near Lok Fu station on the MTR.

Hong Keung Court (康強苑) is a Home Ownership Scheme court near Lok Tung House, Lok Fu Estate. It has one block built in 1999.

== History ==
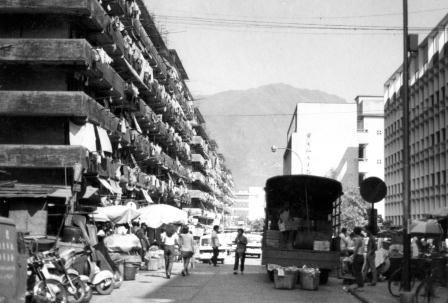
Lok Fu Estate in 1973

Lok Fu Estate was formerly the Lo Fu Ngam Resettlement Area (老虎岩徙置區) and has a total of 23 blocks, 12 Mark I type and 11 Mark II type, built in 1957. As local residents found the name Lo Fu Ngam (Tiger Hill) inauspicious, the settlement was later renamed to Lok Fu (happy and prosperous). A former shrine at the site was moved to a new location in Kwun Tong, which is now within the Tsui Ping Estate. In 1973, the area was renamed the Lok Fu Estate. It started rehabilitation and redevelopment in the 1980s. In 1991, the six blocks in the nearby Wang Tau Hom Estate were allocated to the Lok Fu Estate.

== Houses ==
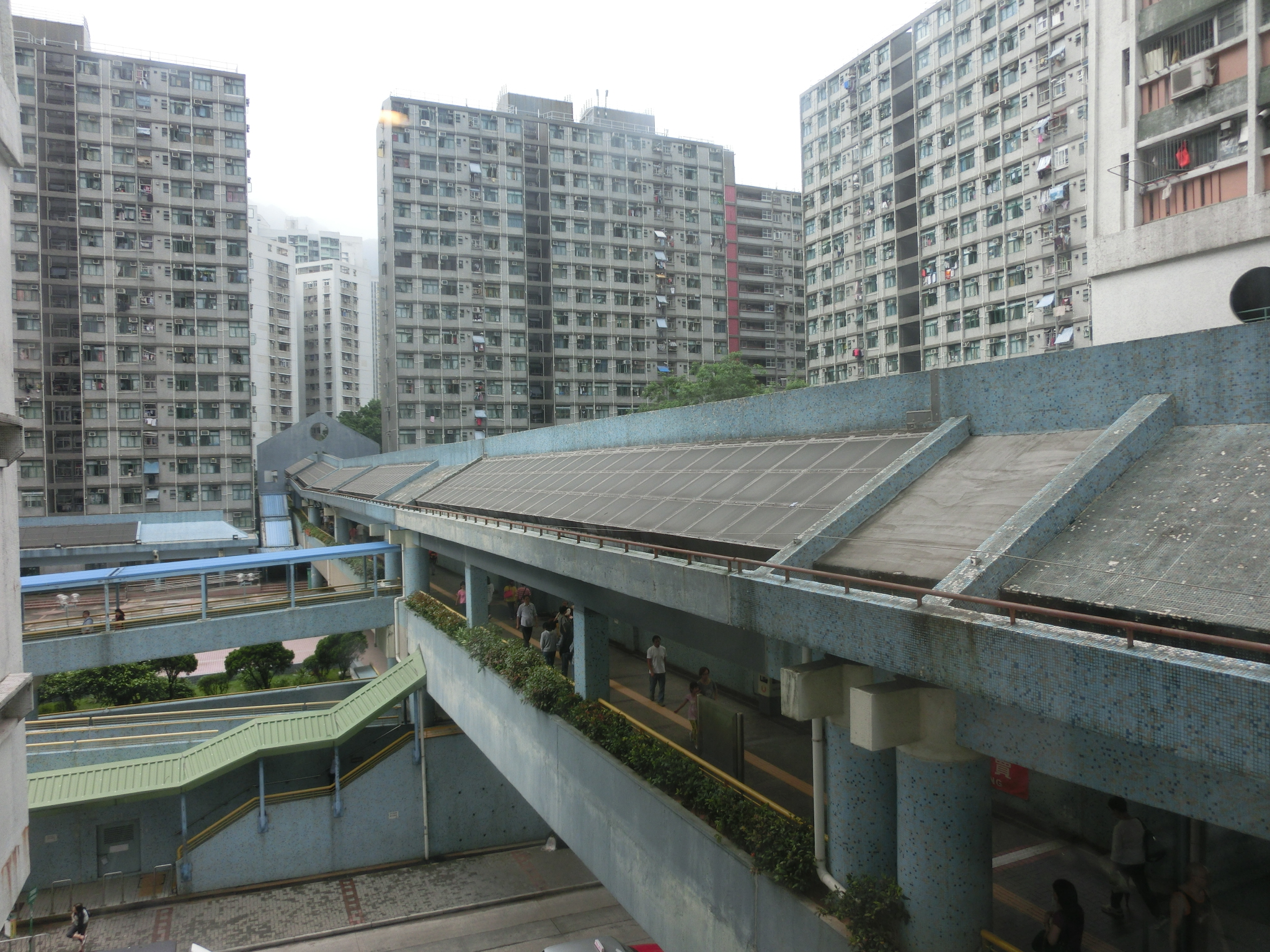
Lok Fu Estate

=== Lok Fu Estate ===
Name	Type	Completion	Floors	Units per floor	Units
Wang Hong House	Old Slab (Special Edition)	1984	17	42 (Floors 6 and 7), 38 (other floors)	464
Wang Lok House	Old Slab (Special Edition)	1984	18	17	255
Wang Shun House	Old Slab (Special Edition)	1984	6	35	109
Wang Tat House	Old Slab (Special Edition)	1984	4	18	18
Wang Yat House	Old Slab (Special Edition)	1984	17	38	456
Wang Yuk House	Old Slab (Special Edition)	1985	18	17	255
Lok Tung House	Linear 3	1989	24	20	523
Lok Tai House	Harmony 1A with Harmony Annex 2	1995/1996	18	20 (without wing), 29 (with wing)	469
Lok Him House	Harmony 1A	1995/1996	19	20	
Lok Tsui House	Harmony 1A	1995/1996	19	20	19
Lok Man House	Harmony 1A	1995/1996	24	20	19

=== Hong Keung Court ===
Name	Type	Completion	Floors	Units per floor	Units
Hong Keung Court	Harmony 1	1999	40 (Floors 1-40)	16	640

== Demographics ==
According to the 2016 by-census, Lok Fu Estate had a population of 9,952. The median age was 50.8 and the majority of residents (96.5 per cent) were of Chinese ethnicity. The average household comprised 2.7 persons. The median monthly household income of all households (i.e. including both economically active and inactive households) was HK$16,450.

== See also ==
- Wang Tau Hom Estate
- Public housing in Hong Kong
- List of public housing estates in Hong Kong
