= Junction Road, Hong Kong =

Road in Kowloon, Hong Kong

Coordinates: 22°19′57.7″N 114°11′13.9″E

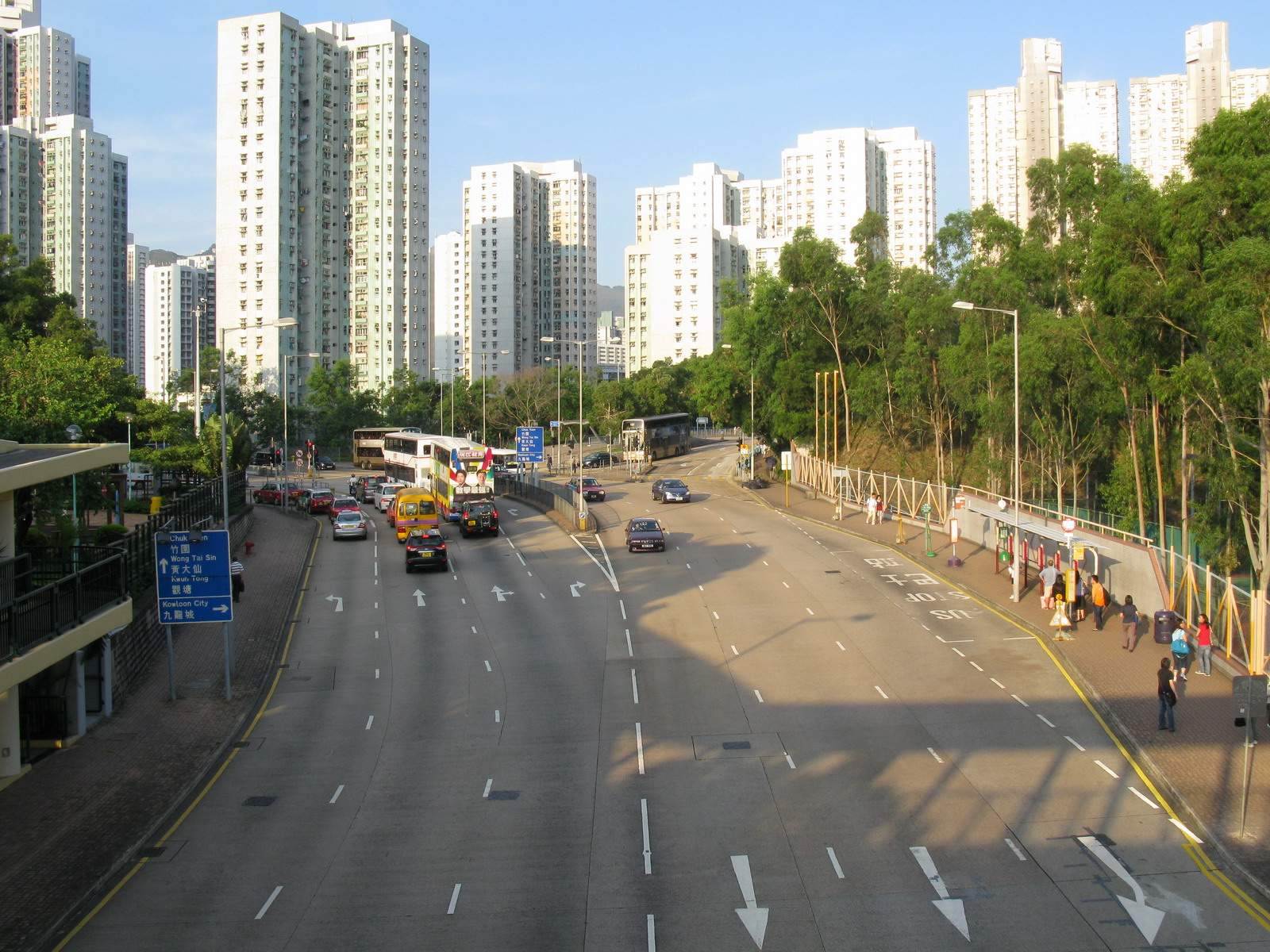
Junction Road

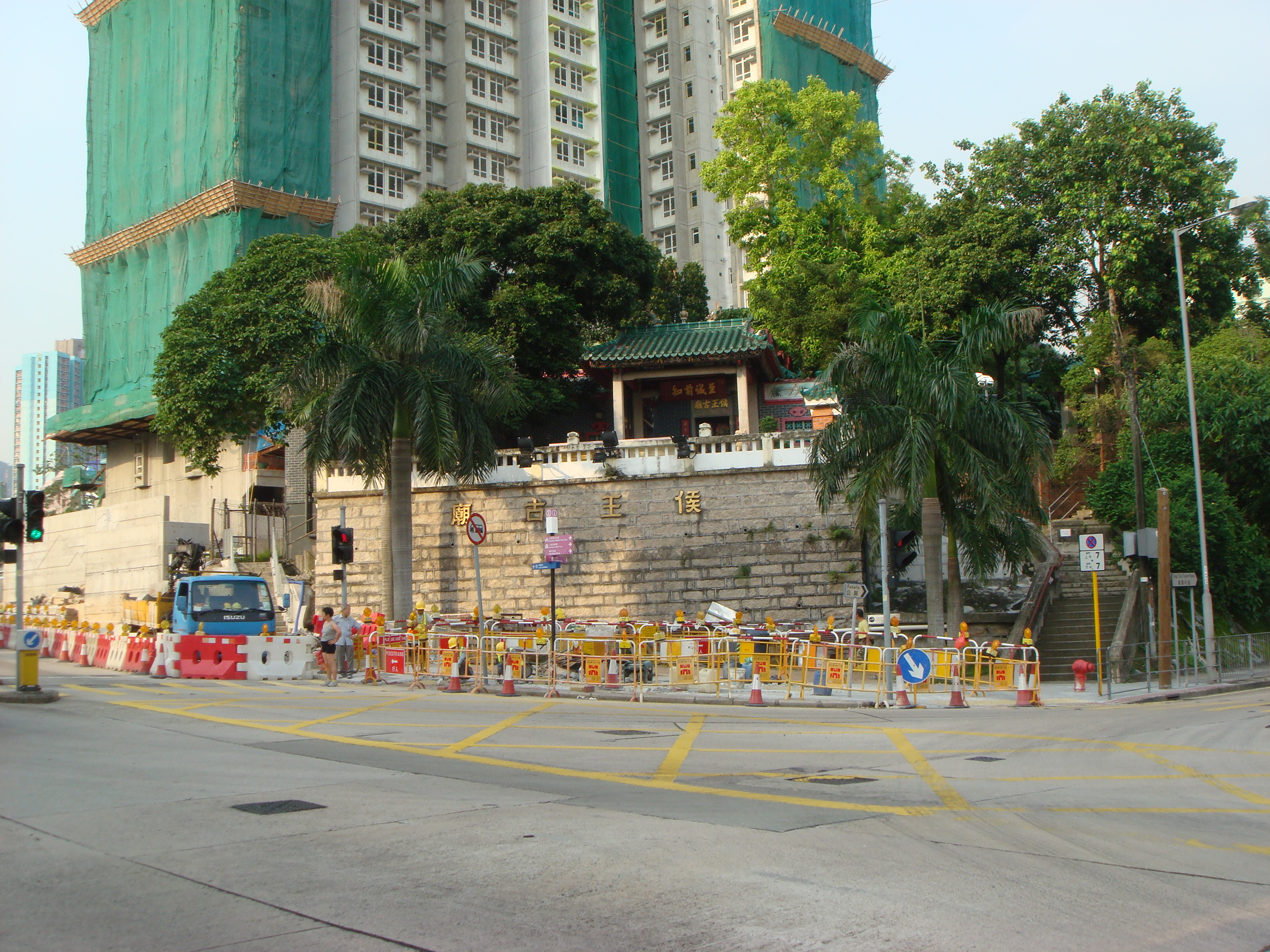
Hau Wong Temple along Junction Road, with Mei Yan House of Mei Tung Estate under construction.

Junction Road (Chinese: 聯合道; Cantonese Yale: Lyùhnhahp Dou) is a road in Kowloon, Hong Kong which runs between Kowloon City and Kowloon Tong.

== History ==
The streets in Kowloon City, including Junction Road, were laid out in the late 1920s and early 1930s. However, at this stage, Junction Road only extended a short distance from Prince Edward Road. By 1960, Junction Road had been extended as far as Dumbarton Road and during the 1960s, it was extended through Lok Fu to Waterloo Road.

As a child Bruce Lee was in a gang called the Junction Street Eight Tigers.

== Location ==
Junction Road runs north–south connecting Waterloo Road and Prince Edward Road West. At a length of 1600 metres, it runs through the areas of Kowloon Tong, Kowloon Tsai, Lok Fu and Kowloon City.

== Features ==
Features from north to south include:

- Kowloon East Barracks
- Junction Road Park
- Lok Fu Park
- Lok Fu Estate
- Bishop Walsh Primary School (#150)
- Chinese Christian Cemetery
- Arts & Technology Education Centre
- HKICC Lee Shau Kee School of Creativity
- Mei Tung Estate (Mei Yan House)
- Hau Wong Temple, at the junction with Tung Tau Tsuen Road. Built around 1730.
- Munsang College
- Carpenter Road Park
- Holy Family Canossian School
