= Lok Fu station =

MTR station in Kowloon, Hong Kong

Lok Fu 樂富
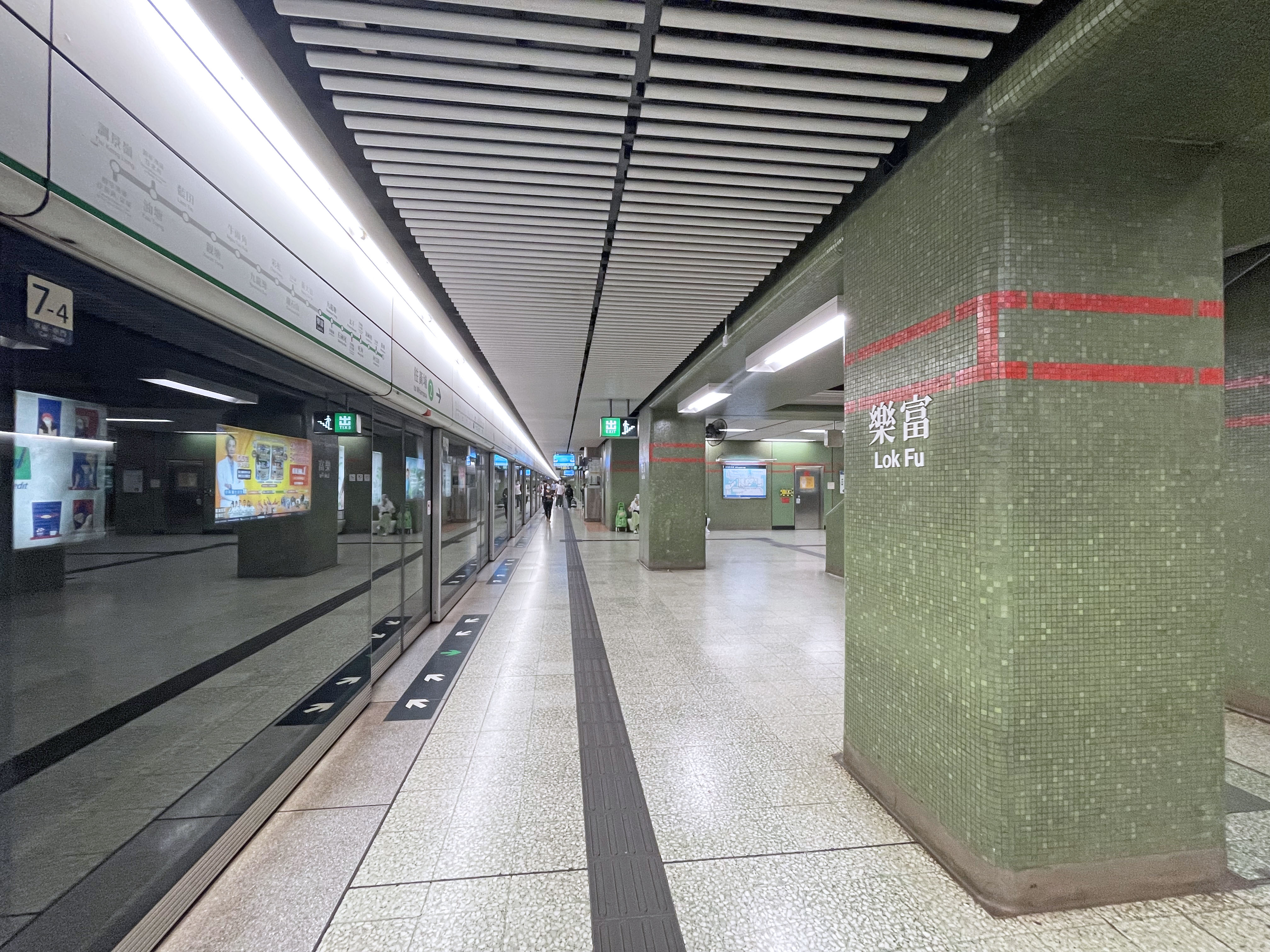
- Platform 2 (2022)

Chinese name
- Traditional Chinese: 樂富
- Simplified Chinese: 乐富
- Jyutping: Lok6fu3
- Hanyu Pinyin: Lèfù
- Literal meaning: Happy and Rich
Transcriptions
Standard Mandarin
- Hanyu Pinyin: Lèfù
Yue: Cantonese
- Yale Romanization: Lohkfu
- IPA: [lɔk̚˨fu˧]
- Jyutping: Lok6fu3

General information
- Location: Between Wang Tat House and Wang Shun House, Lok Fu Estate, Lok Fu; Wong Tai Sin District, Hong Kong
- Coordinates: 22°20′17″N 114°11′14″E
- System: MTR rapid transit station
- Operator: MTR Corporation
- Line: Kwun Tong line
- Platforms: 2 (1 island platform)
- Tracks: 2
- Connections: Bus, minibus

Construction
- Structure type: Underground
- Platform levels: 1
- Accessible: yes

Other information
- Station code: LOF

History
- Opened: 1 October 1979; 46 years ago

Services
Preceding station	MTR	Following station
Kowloon Tong towards Whampoa	Kwun Tong line	Wong Tai Sin towards Tiu Keng Leng
Track layout
Location
- Location within MTR

Lok Fu (Chinese: 樂富; Cantonese Yale: Lohkfu) is a station on the Hong Kong MTR Kwun Tong line. It became operational on 1 October 1979 as part of the Kwun Tong line.

== Livery ==
The station has a unique livery of olive green with red stripes.

== History ==
Contract 201, consisting of the construction of this station and tunnels, was awarded to Metro Joint Venture, a consortium comprising Hochtief AG, Dragages, Gammon (HK) Limited, and Sentab.

The station was opened when the Kwun Tong line was put into use on 1 October 1979.

== Station layout ==
Like any other station on the MTR, this station has a Concourse, Platforms, and Exits. Platforms 1 & 2 use the same island platform.

G	Concourse	Exits, transport interchange
G	Concourse	Customer service, MTR shops
G	Concourse	Vending machines, automatic teller machines
L2; Platforms	Platform 1	Kwun Tong line towards Tiu Keng Leng (Wong Tai Sin) →
L2; Platforms	Island platform, doors will open on the right
L2; Platforms	Platform 2	← Kwun Tong line towards Whampoa (Kowloon Tong)

== Entrances/exits ==
- A: Lok Fu Place (UNY)
- B: Lok Fu Place Zone B
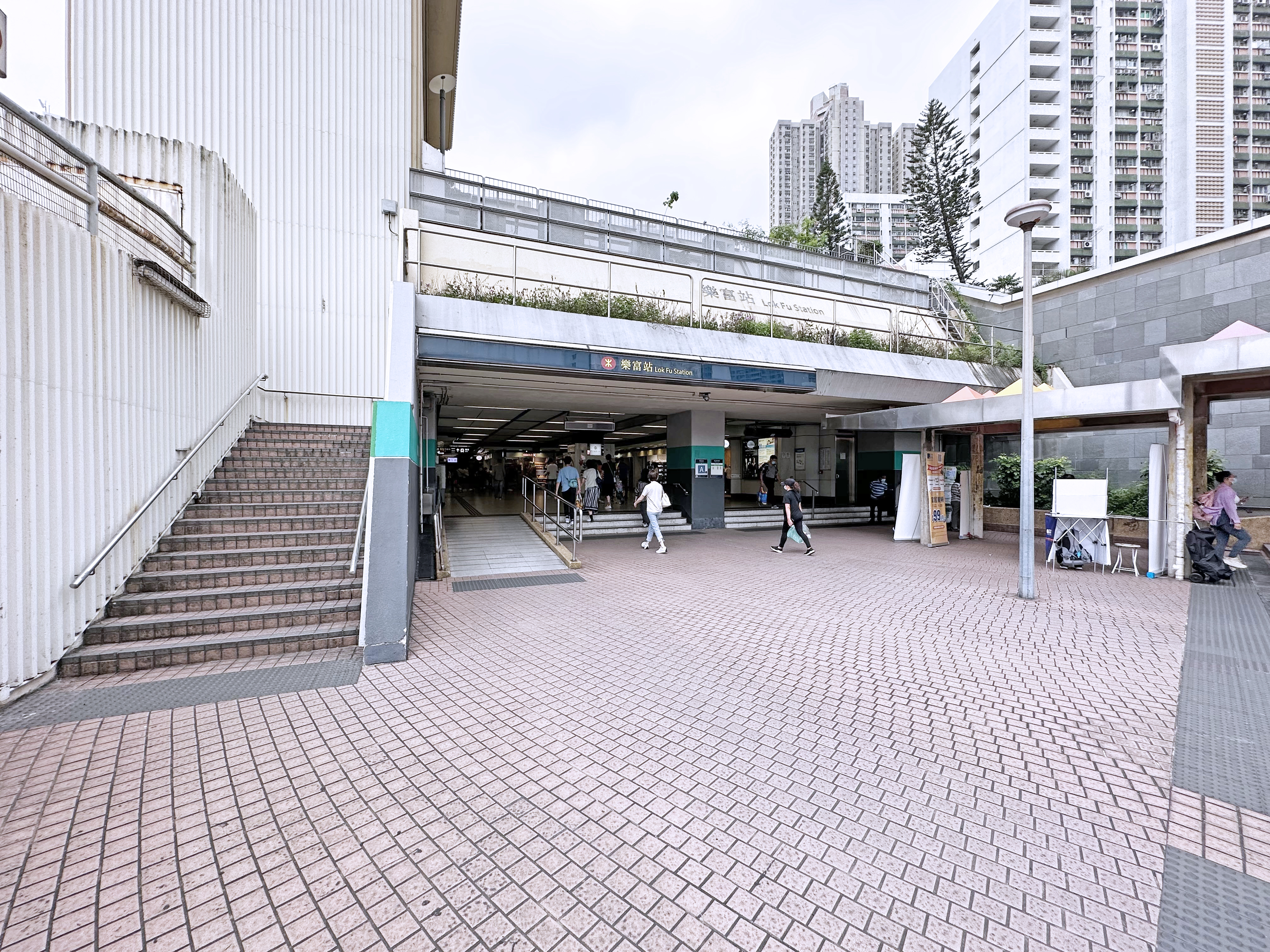
Exit A

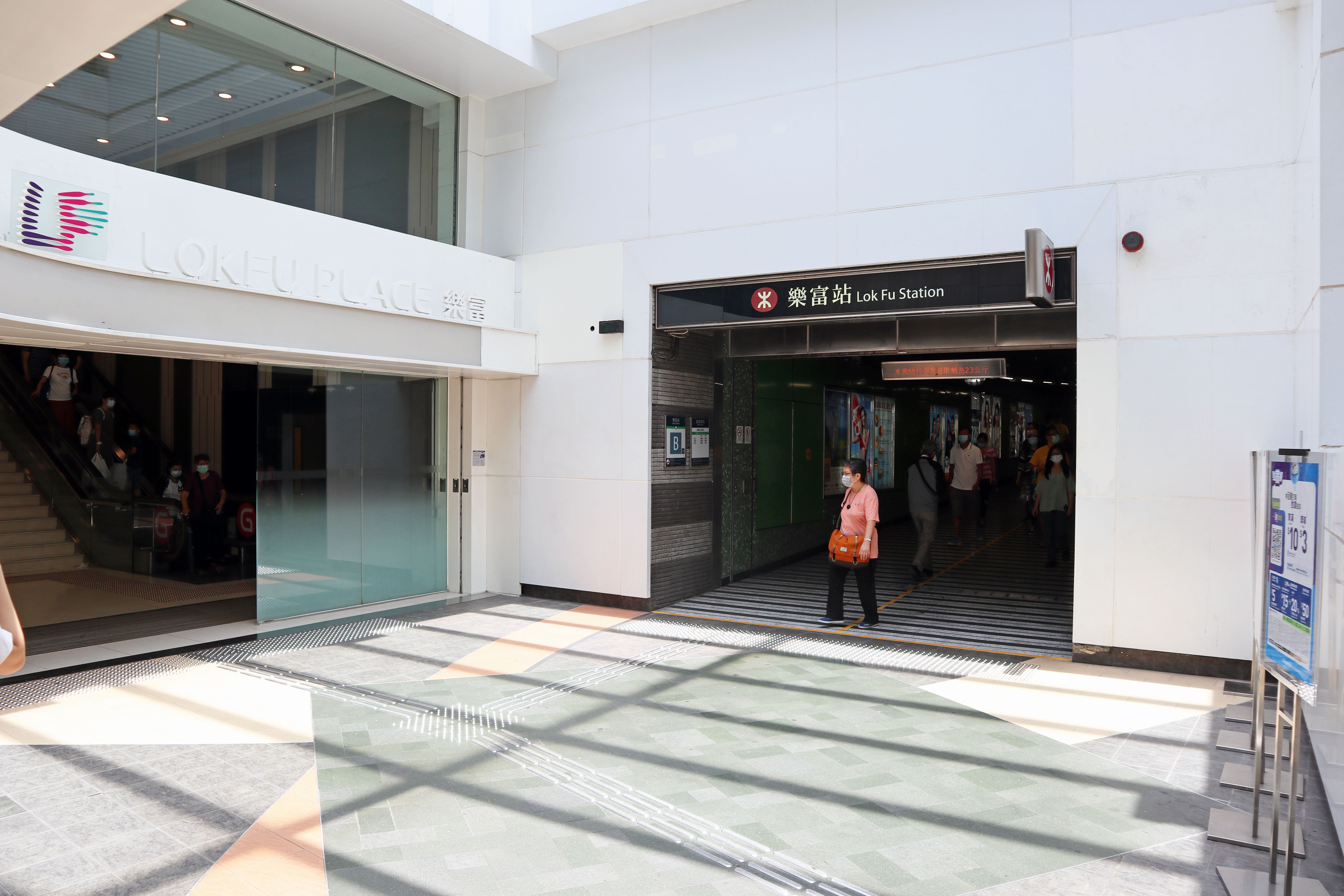
Exit B

== Gallery ==
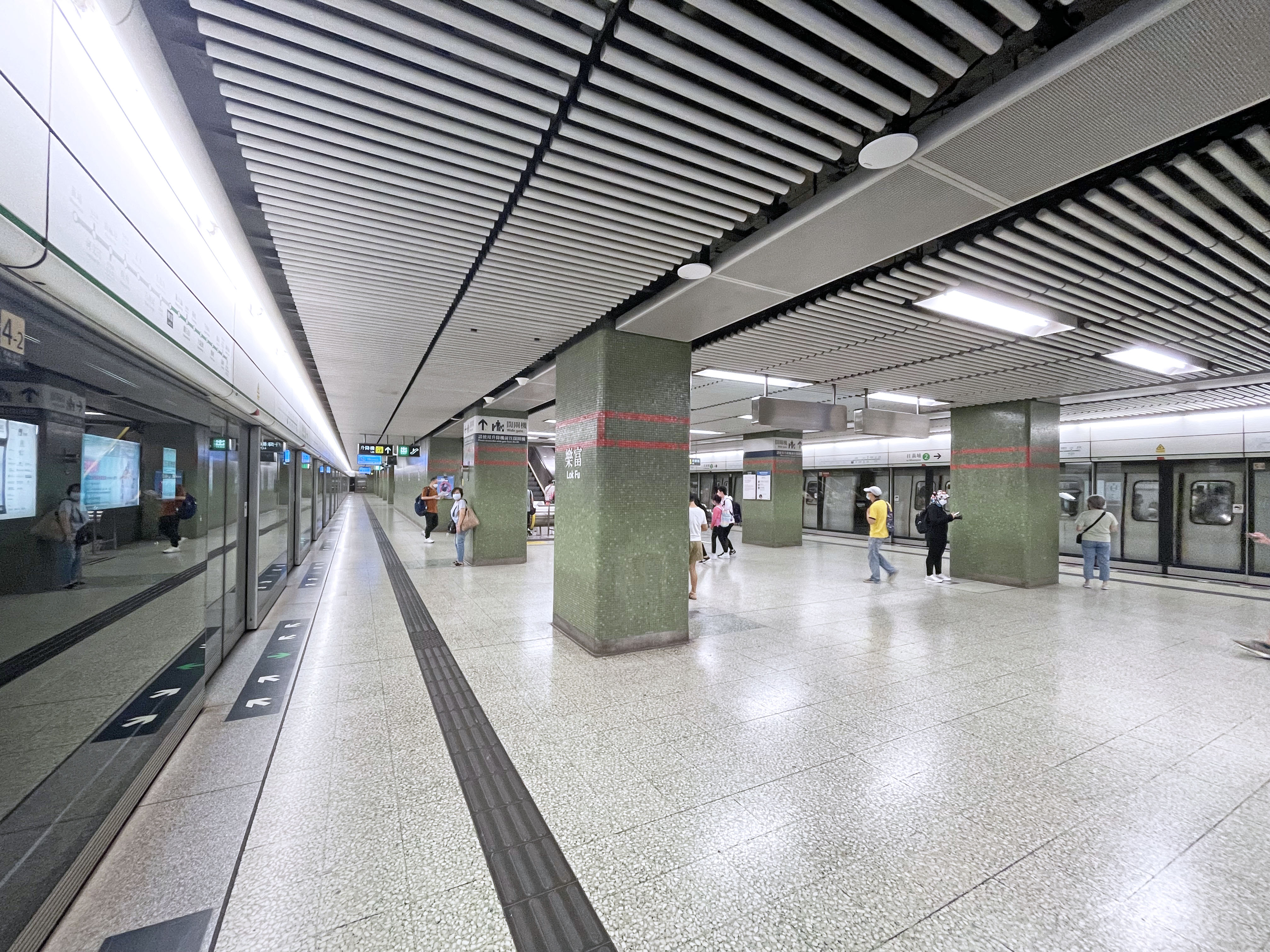
Station platforms 1 and 2 (2022)

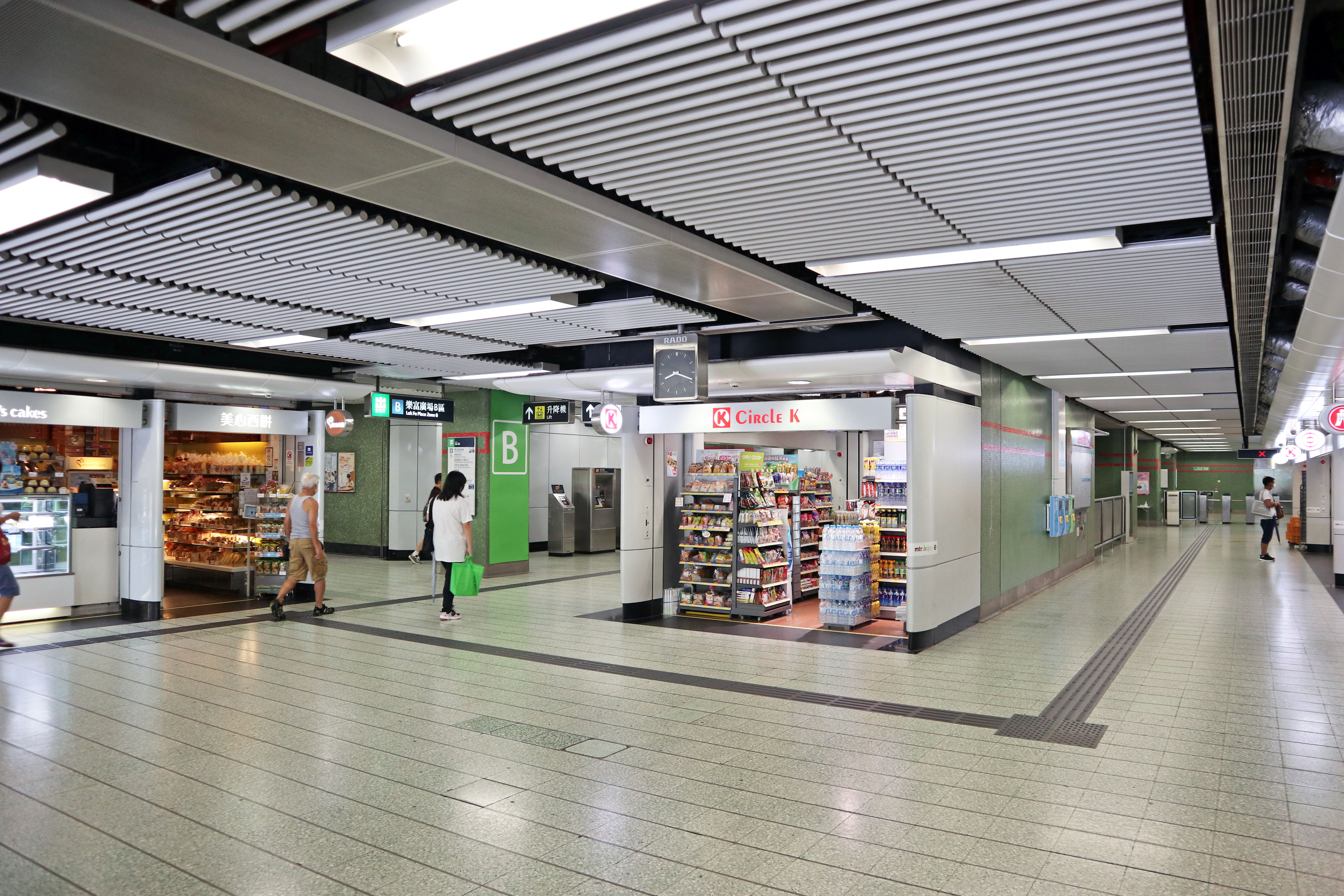
Paid area of the concourse, near Exit B (2020)

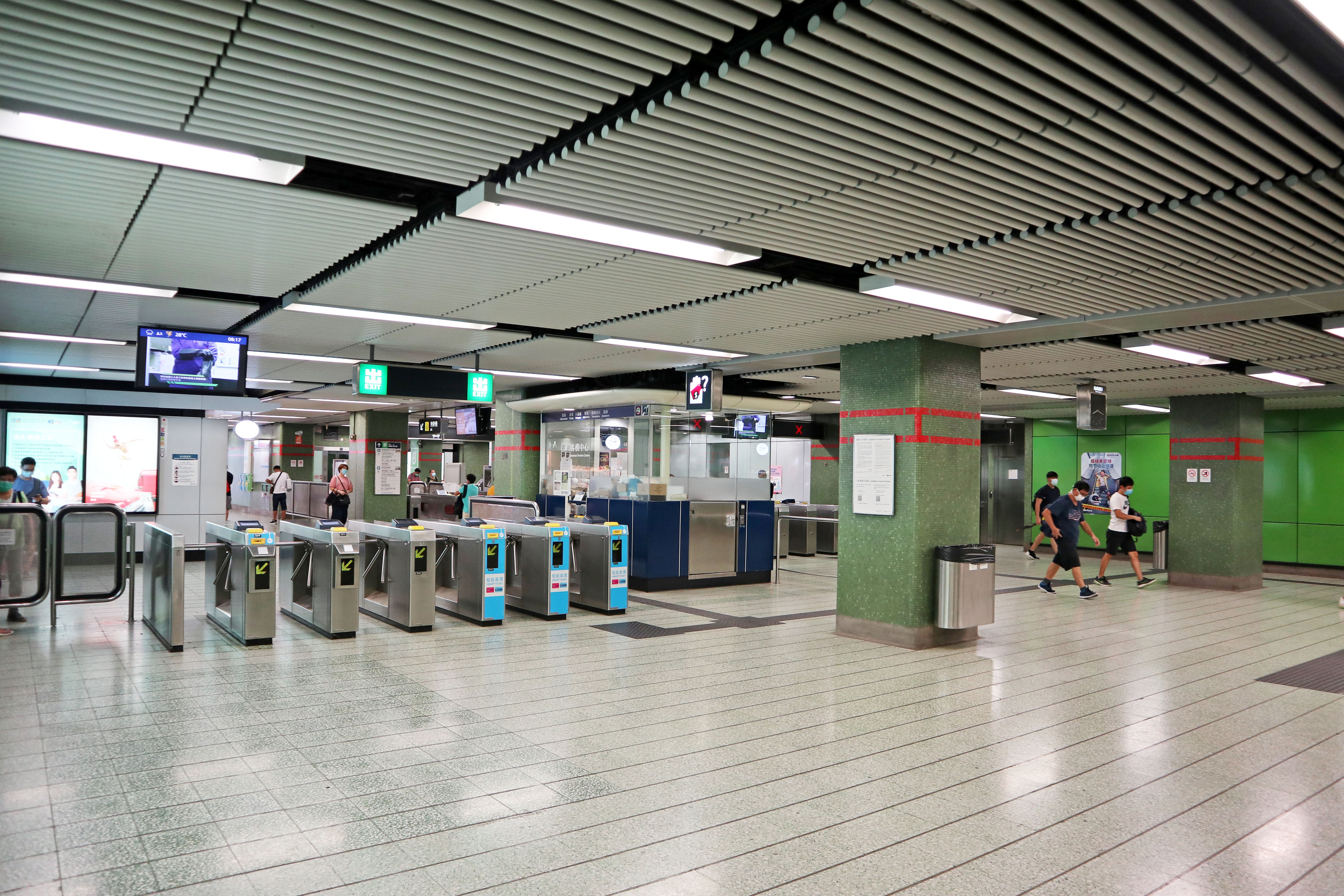
Paid area of the concourse (2020)

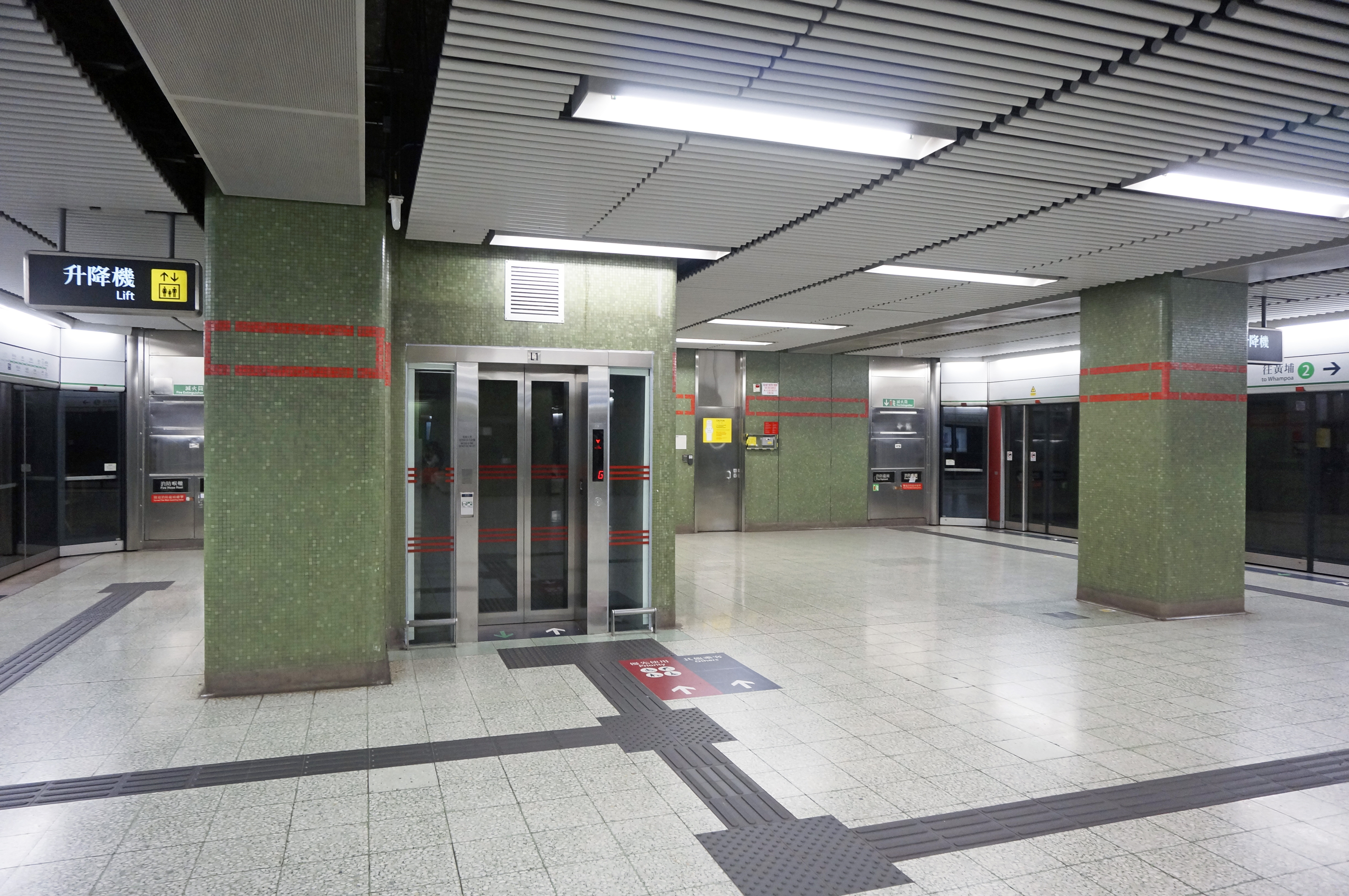
Lift access on the platform (2019)

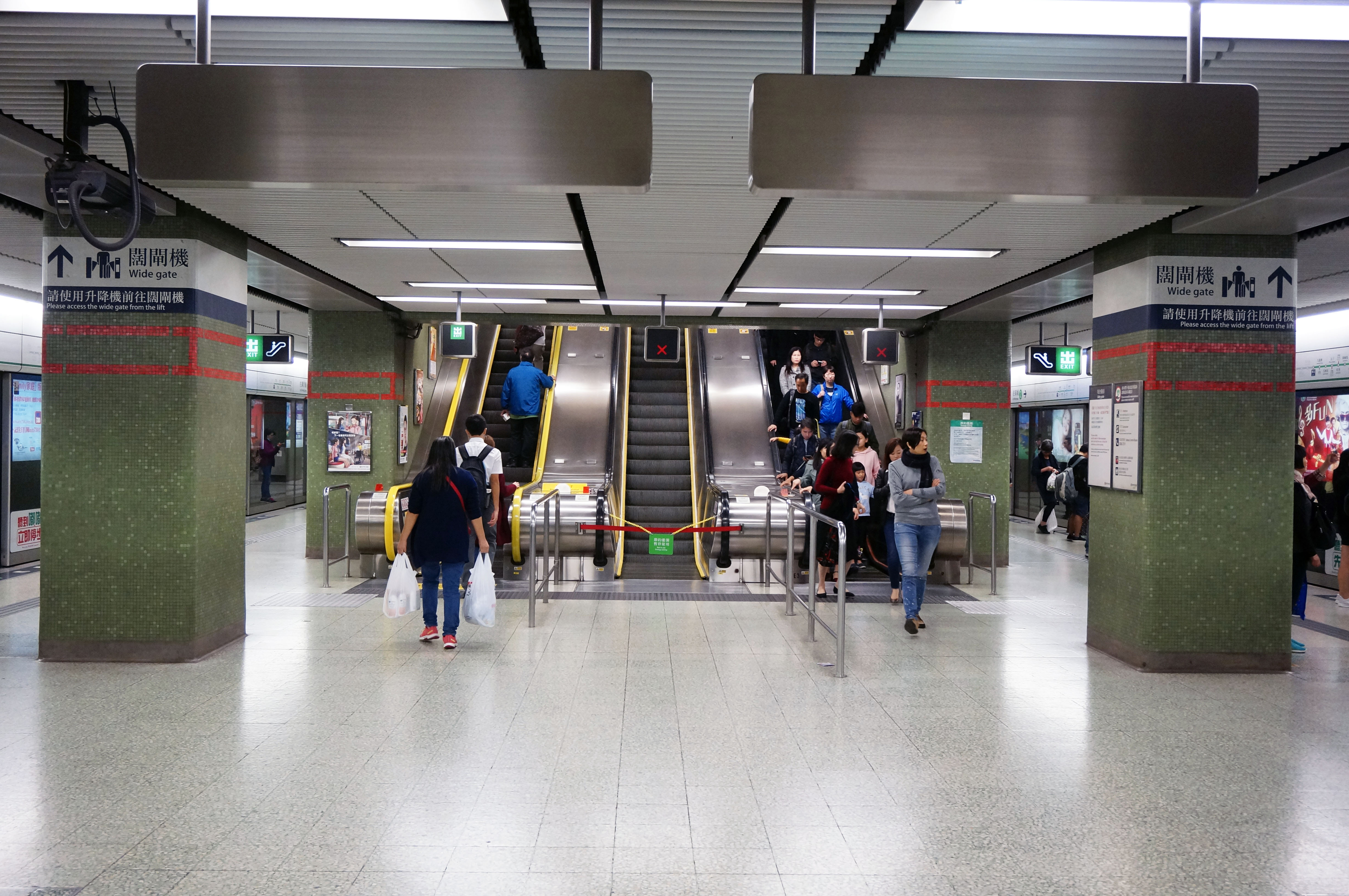
The only set of escalators on the platform (2017)

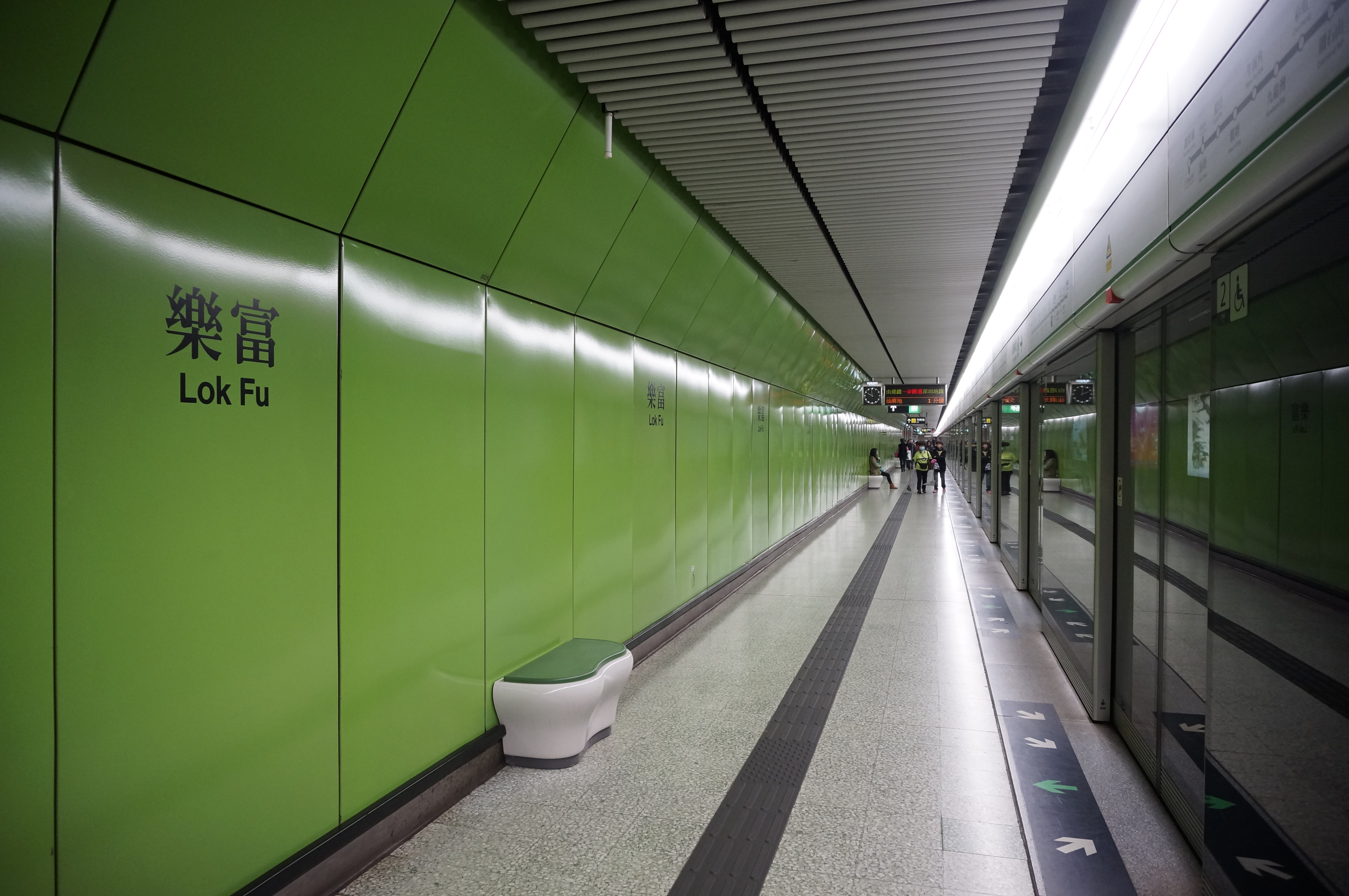
Platform 2 of Lok Fu station (2014)

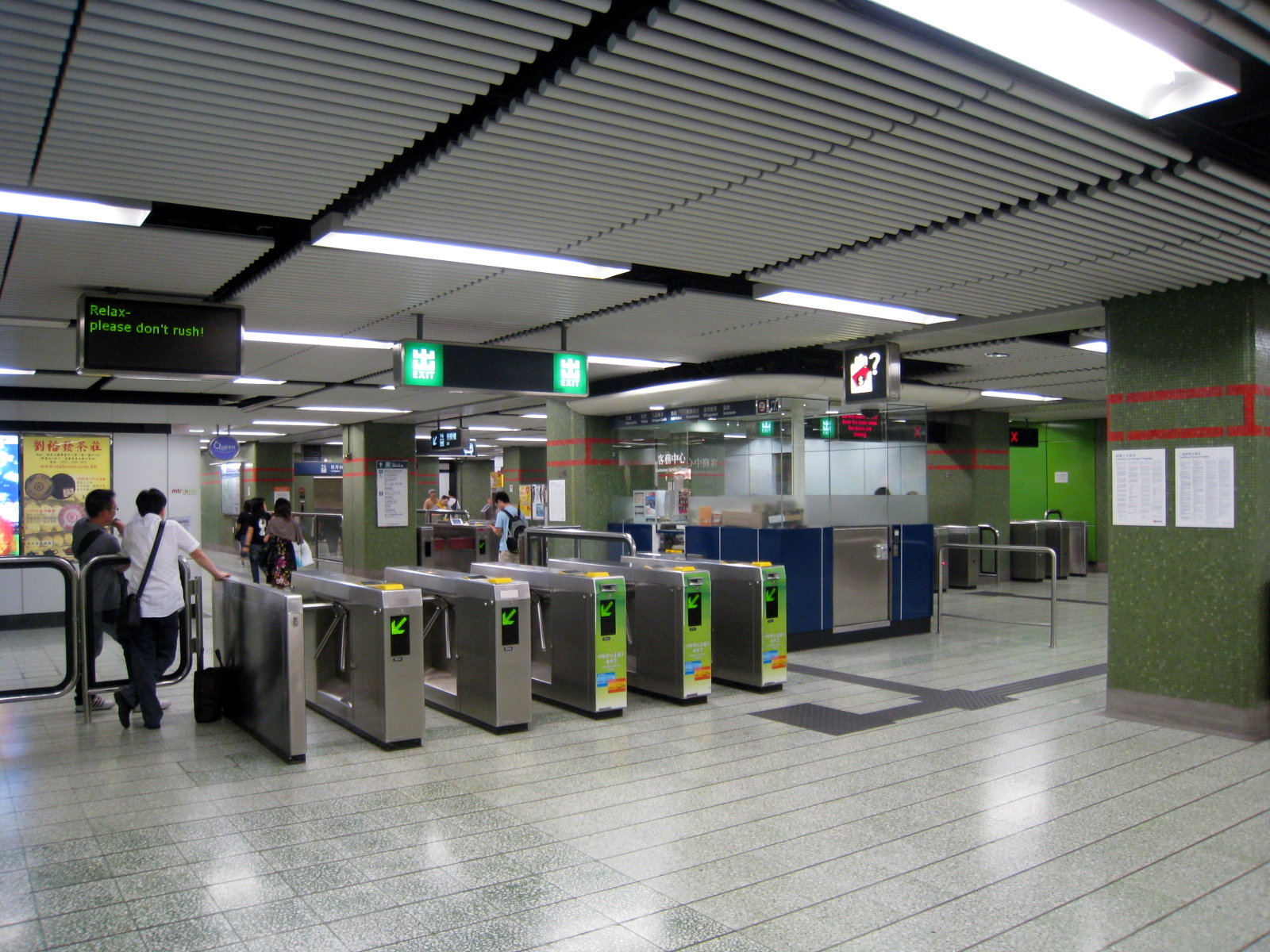
Station concourse of Lok Fu station (2008)
