= List of Home Ownership Scheme Courts in Hong Kong =

This is a list of Home Ownership Scheme (HOS) and Private Sector Participation Scheme (PSPS) Estates in Hong Kong. Estates of Green Form Subsidised Home Ownership Scheme (GFSHOS) and My Home Purchase Plan (MHPP) are also shown in the lists.

They are housing estates sold by Hong Kong Housing Authority (HKHA) and Hong Kong Housing Society.

== Central and Western District, Wan Chai District ==
- nil

== Eastern District ==
Name		Type	Inaug.	No Blocks	No Units	Notes
Aldrich Garden	愛蝶灣	PSPS	2001	10	2,972	
Cheerful Garden	富怡花園	PSPS	1995	5	1,870	
Dip Tsui Court	蝶翠苑	GFSHOS	2022 (Expected)	1	828	
Fullview Garden	富景花園	PSPS	1993	11	3,240	
Greenwood Terrace	康翠臺	PSPS	1985	7	2,100	
Hang Tsui Court	杏翠苑	HOS	1997	2	674	
Harmony Garden	富欣花園	PSPS	1997	8	2,340	
Healthy Village	健康村	Flat-for-Scheme/Rental	1965,1993,1997	14	2,237	HK Housing Society
Hiu Tsui Court	曉翠苑	HOS	1990	2	660	
Kai Tsui Court	佳翠苑	HOS	1993	2	1,216	
King Tsui Court	景翠苑	HOS	1991	1	608	
Kornhill Gardens	康山花園	PSPS	1987	10	2,180	
Lok Hin Terrace	樂軒臺	PSPS	1995	5	1,550	
Neptune Terrace	樂翠臺	PSPS	1986	3	978	
Shan Tsui Court	山翠苑	HOS	1981	4	896	
Tung Chun Court	東駿苑	HOS	1994	2	1,216	
Tung Hei Court	東熹苑	HOS	1995	4	2,432	
Tung Lam Court	東霖苑	HOS	1997	1	697	
Tung Shing Court	東盛苑	HOS	2000	1	370	
Tung Tao Court	東濤苑	HOS	2005	4	1,216	
Tung Yan Court	東欣苑	HOS	1998	2	1,050	
Tung Yuk Court	東旭苑	HOS	2001	5	1,600	
Walton Estate	宏德居	PSPS	1982	4	760	
Yan Tsui Court	茵翠苑	HOS	1983	2	304	
Yee Tsui Court	怡翠苑	HOS	1981	3	600	
Yuet Chui Court	悅翠苑	HOS	1999	1	354	

== Southern District ==
Name		Type	Inaug.	No Blocks	No Units	Notes
Broadview Court	雅濤閣	PSPS	2001	4	1,540	
Hung Fuk Court	鴻福苑	HOS	1997	2	700	
Ka Lung Court	嘉隆苑	HOS	1991	4	1,402	
Lung Tak Court	龍德苑	HOS	2000	4	984	
Lung Yan Court	龍欣苑	HOS	1993	2	360	
Marina Habitat	悅海華庭	Sandwich	1998	3	992	HK Housing Society
Ocean Court	逸港居	PSPS	2000	3	550	
South Wave Court	南濤閣	PSPS	1995	3	1,040	
Yue Fai Court	漁暉苑	HOS	1980	6	1,320	
Yue on Court	漁安苑	HOS	1988	7	1,960	

== Yau Tsim Mong District ==
Name		Type	Inaug.	No Blocks	No Units	Notes
Charming Garden	富榮花園	PSPS	1998	18	3,908	
Hoi Fu Court	海富苑	HOS	1999	1	629	Also part of Public housing estate, Buy or Rent option available

== Sham Shui Po District ==
Name		Type	Inaug.	No Blocks	No Units	Notes
Ching Lai Court	清麗苑	HOS	1981	7	970	
Cronin Garden	樂年花園	Flat-For-Sale	1995	7	728	HK Housing Society
Hang Chun Court	幸俊苑	HOS	2001	2	740	
Po Hei Court	寶熙苑	HOS	1993	2	390	
Po Lai Court	寶麗苑	HOS	1987	3	378-	
Yee Ching Court	怡靖苑	HOS	1993	3	672	
Yee Kok Court	怡閣苑	HOS	1981	7	694	
Lai Tsui Court	麗翠苑	GFSHOS	2019	4	2,545	
Hoi Lok Court	凱樂苑	HOS	2019	5	2,522	
Hoi Tak Court	凱德苑	HOS	2020	1	814	

== Kowloon City District ==
=== Ho Man Tin ===
Name		Type	Inaug.	No Blocks	No Units	Notes
Cascades	欣圖軒	Sandwich	1999	4	712	HK Housing Society
Chun Man Court	俊民苑	HOS	1981	12	1,800	
Kwun Fai Court	冠暉苑	HOS	1999	2	300	Mortgage subsidy
Kwun Hei Court	冠熹苑	HOS	2000	1	796	
Kwun Tak Court	冠德苑	HOS	2019	3	603	

=== Kai Tak ===
Name		Type	Inaug.	No Blocks	No Units	Notes
Kai Long Court	啟朗苑	HOS	2019	3	683	
Kai Yan Court	啟欣苑	HOS	2025	2	1,840	

=== Hung Hom ===
Name		Type	Inaug.	No Blocks	No Units	Notes
Ka Wai Chuen	家維邨	Flat-for-Scheme/Rental	1984,1987,1990,1993	9	2,568	HK Housing Society

== Wong Tai Sin District ==
Name		Type	Inaug.	No Blocks	No Units	Notes
Bel Air Heights	悅庭軒	Sandwich	1999	4	798	HK Housing Society
Choi Fung Court	彩峰苑	HOS	1997	1	608	
Fu Keung Court	富強苑	HOS	1991	6	1,370	
Fung Chuen Court	鳳鑽苑	HOS	1991	1	612	
Fung Lai Court	鳳禮苑	HOS	1997	2	690	
Grand View Garden	宏景花園	PSPS	2000	6	2,230	
Hong Keung Court	康強苑	HOS	1999	1	640	
Ka Keung Court	嘉強苑	HOS	1998	2	610	
Kai Chuen Court	啟鑽苑	GFSHOS	2024	3	2,112	Green Form Home Ownership Pilot Scheme
Kai Tak Garden	啟德花園	Flat-for-Sale	1998, 2001	5	1,256	HK Housing Society
King Hin Court	瓊軒苑	HOS	2002	1	344	
King Lai Court	瓊麗苑	HOS	1989	2	700	
King Shan Court	瓊山苑	HOS	1982	6	1,584	
King Tai Court	景泰苑	GFSHOS	2017	1	857	Green Form Home Ownership Pilot Scheme
Kingsford Terrace	嘉峰臺	PSPS	2003	5	2010	
Lung Poon Court	龍蟠苑	HOS	1987	7	3,680	
Pang Ching Court	鵬程苑	HOS	1991	1	816	
Rhythm Garden	采頤花園	PSPS	2000	12	3,000	
Sun Lai Garden	新麗花園	PSPS	1985	3	600	
Tak Keung Court	德強苑	HOS	2001	2	700	
Tin Ma Court	天馬苑	HOS	1986	5	2,800	
Tin Wang Court	天宏苑	HOS	1992	3	630	
Tsui Chuk Garden	翠竹花園	PSPS	1989	14	3,524	
Tsz Oi Court	慈愛苑	HOS	1997	12	4,020	
Tsz On Court	慈安苑	HOS	1994	2	972	
Ying Fuk Court	盈福苑	HOS	2001	1	370	

== Kwun Tong District ==
Name		Type	Inaug.	No Blocks	No Units	Notes
Cheung Wo Court	祥和苑	HOS	1984	6	1,584	
Choi Hing Court	彩興苑	HOS	2019	3	1,358	
Chun Wah Court	振華苑	HOS	1990	1	232	
Hiu Lai Court	曉麗苑	HOS	1997	8	4,864	
Hong Nga Court	康雅苑	HOS	1993	3	1,824	
Hong Pak Court	康栢苑	HOS	1993	7	2,410	
Hong Shui Court	康瑞苑	HOS	1999	1	350	
Hong Tin Court	康田苑	HOS	1982	3	792	
Hong Wah Court	康華苑	HOS	1987	3	1,680	
Hong Yat Court	康逸苑	HOS	2001	5	1,600	
Hong Ying Court	康盈苑	HOS	1991	1	816	
Kai Tai Court	啟泰苑	HOS	1983	4	624	
Ko Chun Court	高俊苑	HOS	1995	5	1,616	
Lei On Court	鯉安苑	HOS	2002	6	853	
Lok Nga Court	樂雅苑	HOS	1984	6	1,331	
On Kay Court	安基苑	HOS	1982	4	920	
Po Pui Court	寶珮苑	HOS	1995	5	1,750	
Richland Gardens	麗晶花園	PSPS	1985	22	5,904	
Shun Chi Court	順緻苑	HOS	1980	6	1,539	
Yau Mei Court and Yau Chui Court	油美苑及油翠苑	HOS	2002	11	3,872	
Yau Tong Centre	油塘中心	PSPS	1981	9	506	

== Sai Kung District ==
=== Anderson ===
Name		Type	Inaug.	No Blocks	No Units	Notes
On Sau Court	安秀苑	HOS	2025	2	1,906	
On Ying Court	安楹苑	HOS	2025	2	1,140	
On Pak Court	安栢苑	HOS	2025	1	420	
On Wah Court	安樺苑	HOS	2025	2	990	
On Lai Court	安麗苑	HOS	2025	3	1,380	

=== Sai Kung ===
Name		Type	Inaug.	No Blocks	No Units	Notes
Lakeside Garden	翠塘花園	Flat-for-Sale/Rental	1997	11	970	HK Housing Society

=== Tseung Kwan O ===
Name		Type	Inaug.	No Blocks	No Units	Notes
Bauhinia Garden	寶盈花園	PSPS	2001	8	3,200	
Beverly Garden	富康花園	PSPS	1998	10	3,966	
Choi Ming Court	彩明苑	HOS	2001	6	1,920	Buy or Rent option
Chung Ming Court	頌明苑	HOS	1993	5	1,750	
Fu Ning Garden	富寧花園	PSPS	1990	6	2,450	
Hin Ming Court	顯明苑	HOS	1996	1	759	
Ho Ming Court	浩明苑	HOS	1990	1	816	
Hong Sing Garden	康盛花園	PSPS	1989	5	1,850	
Jolly Place	樂頤居	Senior Citizen	2003	1	243	HK Housing Society
King Ming Court	景明苑	HOS	1988	3	1,050	
Kwong Ming Court	廣明苑	HOS	1998	7	4,256	
Mount Verdant	翠嶺峰	SSFP	2021	1	330	HK Housing Society
On Ning Garden	安寧花園	PSPS	1991	6	2,300	
Po Ming Court	寶明苑	HOS	1998	2	1,476	
Radiant Towers	旭輝臺	Sandwich	1998	2	704	HK Housing Society
The Pinnacle	疊翠軒	Sandwich	1999	4	1,424	HK Housing Society
Tong Ming Court	唐明苑	HOS	1999	3	1,920	
Verbena Heights	茵怡花園	Flat-for-Sale/Rental	1996	7	2,865	HK Housing Society
Wo Ming Court	和明苑	HOS	1999	4	1,640	
Yan Ming Court	欣明苑	HOS	1990	5	1,750	
Ying Ming Court	英明苑	HOS	1989	5	1,750	
Yu Ming Court	裕明苑	HOS	1994	2	1,216	
Yuk Ming Court	煜明苑	HOS	1996	3	1,824	
Yung Ming Court	雍明苑	HOS	2020	2	1,395	
Chiu Ming Court	昭明苑	HOS	2025	1	594	

== Kwai Tsing District ==
=== Kwai Chung ===
Name		Type	Inaug.	No Blocks	No Units	Notes
Kwai Chun Court	葵俊苑	HOS	1995	3	1,050	
Kwai Hong Court	葵康苑	HOS	1993	2	701	
Kwai Yin Court	葵賢苑	HOS	1993	2	700	
Hibiscus Park	芊紅居	Sandwich	1998	2	420	HK Housing Society
Highland Park	浩景臺	Sandwich	1999	6	1,456	HK Housing Society
Lai Yan Court	荔欣苑	HOS	2001	3	1,920	
Ning Fung Court	寧峰苑	HOS	2001	4	1,280	
Sheung Man Court	尚文苑	HOS	2020	1	494	
Tsui Yiu Court	翠瑤苑	HOS	1981	1	292	
Yi Fung Court	怡峰苑	HOS	1999	2	700	
Yin Lai Court	賢麗苑	HOS	1991	2	560	
Yuet Lai Court	悅麗苑	HOS	1981	4	704	

=== Tsing Yi ===
Name		Type	Inaug.	No Blocks	No Units	Notes
Ching Nga Court	青雅苑	HOS	1989	1	816	
Ching Shing Court	青盛苑	HOS	1985	1	800	
Ching Tai Court	青泰苑	HOS	1988	7	2,180	
Ching Wah Court	青華苑	HOS	1986	6	2,460	
Ching Wang Court	青宏苑	HOS	2001	2	576	
Serene Garden	海悅花園	PSPS	1992	3	840	
Broadview Garden	偉景花園	Flat-for-Scheme/Rental	1991	7	1,776	HK Housing Society
Greenview Villa	綠悠雅苑	SSFP	2015	3	988	HK Housing Society
Ching Chun Court	青俊苑	HOS	2017	2	465	
Ching Fu Court	青富苑	GFSHOS	2022	2	2,868	
Tivoli Garden	宏福花園	Sandwich	1995	4	1,024	HK Housing Society

== Tsuen Wan District ==
Name		Type	Inaug.	No Blocks	No Units	Notes
Clague Garden Estate	祈德尊新邨	Flat-for-Scheme/Rental	1996	3	1,479	HK Housing Society
Bo Shek Mansion	寶石大廈	Flat-for-Scheme/Rental	1996	3	667	HK Housing Society
Sheung Chui Court	尚翠苑	HOS	2017	3	962	

== Tuen Mun District ==
Name		Type	Inaug.	No Blocks	No Units	Notes
Affluence Garden	澤豐花園	PSPS	1989	5	2,208	
Chi Lok Fa Yuen	置樂花園	PSPS	1982	8	1,000	
Glorious Garden	富健花園	PSPS	1999	12	3,026	
Kingston Terrace	景新臺	Flat-For-Sale	2002	4	1,152	HK Housing Society
Lung Mun Oasis	龍門居	PSPS	1998	16	3,800	
Melody Garden	美樂花園	PSPS	1984	10	2,240	Middle Income Housing Scheme
Prime View Garden	景峰花園	PSPS	1985	5	1,520	
San Wai Court	新圍苑	HOS	1989	6	2,100	
Siu Hei Court	兆禧苑	HOS	1985	5	2,800	
Siu Hin Court	兆軒苑	HOS	1991	2	1,224	
Siu Hong Court	兆康苑	HOS	1982	20	4,676	
Siu Kwai Court	兆畦苑	HOS	1990	2	1,425	
Siu Lun Court	兆麟苑	HOS	1993	12	4,200	
Siu Lung Court	兆隆苑	HOS	1991	1	612	
Siu on Court	兆安苑	HOS	1982	10	1,311	
Siu Pong Court	兆邦苑	HOS	1991	1	612	
Siu Shan Court	兆山苑	HOS	1983	12	1,872	
Terrace Concerto	翠鳴臺	SSFP	2021	1	290	HK Housing Society
Tsui Ning Garden	翠寧花園	PSPS	1991	6	2,100	
Yuet Wu Villa	悅湖山莊	PSPS	1994	15	3,890	

== Yuen Long District ==
=== Yuen Long Town ===
Name		Type	Inaug.	No Blocks	No Units	Notes
Fung Ting Court	鳳庭苑	HOS	2001	2	312	
Wang Fu Court	宏富苑	HOS	2017	1	229	

=== Tin Shui Wai ===
Name		Type	Inaug.	No Blocks	No Units	Notes
Tin Chung Court	天頌苑	HOS	1999	15	6,080	
Tin Fu Court	天富苑	HOS	2000	16	5,120	
Tin Lai Court	天麗苑	HOS	1997	1	756	
Tin Oi Court	天愛苑	HOS	1993	2	1,216	
Tin Shing Court	天盛苑	HOS	1999	17	6,580	
Tin Yau Court	天祐苑	HOS	1992	3	1,824	

=== Ping Shan ===
Name		Type	Inaug.	No Blocks	No Units	Notes
Ping Yan Court	屏欣苑	HOS	2018	3	2409	

== North District ==
=== Fanling ===
Name		Type	Inaug.	No Blocks	No Units	Notes
Cheong Shing Court	昌盛苑	HOS	2000	4	1,280	
Ka Shing Court	嘉盛苑	HOS	1995	4	2,432	
King Shing Court	景盛苑	HOS	1995	4	2,432	
Wing Fai Centre	榮輝中心	PSPS	1996	4	1,350	
Wing Fok Centre	榮福中心	PSPS	1994	6	1,680	
Yan Shing Court	欣盛苑	HOS	1993	7	2,450	
Yung Shing Court	雍盛苑	HOS	2000	1	800	Buy or Rent option
Shan Lai Court	山麗苑	HOS	2021	6	3,222	

=== Sheung Shui ===
Name		Type	Inaug.	No Blocks	No Units	Notes
Choi Po Court	彩蒲苑	HOS	1984	4	2,112	
On Shing Court	安盛苑	HOS	1990	1	612	
Sunningdale Garden	順欣花園	HOS	1992	4	830	
Tsui Lai Garden	翠麗花園	PSPS	1990	6	2,012	
Yuk Po Court	旭埔苑	HOS	1982	8	1,248	

== Tai Po District ==
Name		Type	Inaug.	No Blocks	No Units	Notes
Chung Nga Court	頌雅苑	HOS	1991	3	2,040	
Elegance Garden	富雅花園	PSPS	1990	4	1,060	
King Nga Court	景雅苑	HOS	1992	2	700	
Ming Nga Court	明雅苑	HOS	1985	3	1,680	
Po Nga Court	寶雅苑	HOS	1989	3	2,448	
Sun Hing Garden	新興花園	PSPS	1986	5	1,460	
Tai Po Plaza	大埔廣場	PSPS	1985	5	1,408	
Tak Nga Court	德雅苑	HOS	1992	1	816	
Ting Nga Court	汀雅苑	HOS	1981	3	395	
Wang Fuk Court	宏福苑	HOS	1983	~~8~~ 1	~~1,984~~ 248	7 of those were destroyed during 2025 Tai Po apartment fire
Yat Nga Court	逸雅苑	HOS	1991	2	1,224	
Yee Nga Court	怡雅苑	HOS	1993	5	1,750	

== Sha Tin District ==
=== Sha Tin, Tai Wai and Fo Tan ===
Name		Type	Inaug.	No Blocks	No Units	Notes
Carado Garden	雲叠花園	PSPS	1990	6	1,988	
Fung Shing Court	豐盛苑	HOS	1985	3	2,448	
Grandway Garden	富嘉花園	HOS	1989	3	864	
Greenhill Villa	綠怡雅苑	SSFP	2019	3	1,020	
Holford Garden	海福花園	PSPS	1985	3	800	
Hong Lam Court	康林苑	HOS	1990	3	1,050	
Ka Keng Court	嘉徑苑	HOS	2002	2	640	
Ka Tin Court	嘉田苑	HOS	1988	6	1,680	
King Tin Court	景田苑	HOS	1983	6	1,424	
Kwong Lam Court	廣林苑	HOS	1990	3	1,832	
May Shing Court	美城苑	HOS	1984	3	2,192	
Mei Chung Court	美松苑	HOS	1996	6	1,940	
Sunshine Grove	晴碧花園	Sandwich	1999	2	508	HK Housing Society
Sui Wo Court	穗禾苑	HOS	1980	9	3,501	
Yu Chui Court	愉翠苑	HOS	2001	16	4,176	
Yue Shing Court	愉城苑	HOS	1980	4	530	
Yue Tin Court	愉田苑	HOS	1982	7	1,704	
Mei Ying Court	美盈苑	HOS	2017	1	216	
Mei Pak Court	美柏苑	HOS	2017	1	288	
Ka Shun Court	嘉順苑	HOS	2018	1	248	
Yuk Wo Court	旭禾苑	HOS	2020	1	830	
Choi Wo Court	彩禾苑	HOS	2020	1	806	
Yue Tak Court	愉德苑	HOS	2023	1	543	
Greenhill Villa	綠怡雅苑	SSFP	2020	3	1020	

=== Ma On Shan ===
Name		Type	Inaug.	No Blocks	No Units	Notes
Chevalier Garden	富安花園	PSPS	1988	17	3,942	
Fok On Garden	福安花園	PSPS	1992	2	600	
Fu Fai Garden	富輝花園	PSPS	1992	2	520	
Kam Chun Court	錦俊苑	HOS	2022	5	2,069	
Kam Fai Court	錦暉苑	HOS	2020	1	735	
Kam Fung Court	錦豐苑	HOS	1996	9	3,648	
Kam Hay Court	錦禧苑	HOS	1989	3	1,050	
Kam Lung Court	錦龍苑	HOS	1993	4	1,400	
Kam On Court	錦鞍苑	HOS	1987	3	1,050	
Kam Tai Court	錦泰苑	HOS	2000	12	3,440	
Kam Ying Court	錦英苑	HOS	1991	10	3,500	
Park Belvedere	雅景臺	Sandwich	1998	4	992	HK Housing Society
Saddle Ridge Garden	富寶花園	PSPS	1993	12	4,200	

== Islands District ==
Name		Type	Inaug.	No Blocks	No Units	Location
Lung Hin Court	龍軒苑	HOS	1995	4	179	Tai O
Peng Lai Court	坪麗苑	HOS	1996	1	148	Peng Chau
Yu Tung Court	裕東苑	HOS	1997	5	2,640	Tung Chung
Tin Lee Court	天利苑	HOS	1995 as part of Lung Tin Estate, converted to HOS in 2014	1	85	Tai O
Ngan Ho Court	銀河苑	HOS	2018	2	529	Mui Wo
Ngan Wai Court	銀蔚苑	HOS	2018	1	170	Mui Wo
Yu Tai Court	裕泰苑	HOS	2020	2	1,226	Tung Chung
Yu Nga Court	裕雅苑	HOS	2022	6	3,300	Tung Chung

== See also ==
- Home Ownership Scheme
- Private Sector Participation Scheme
- List of public housing estates in Hong Kong
