= Neptune Terrace =

Public housing estate in Chai Wan, Hong Kong

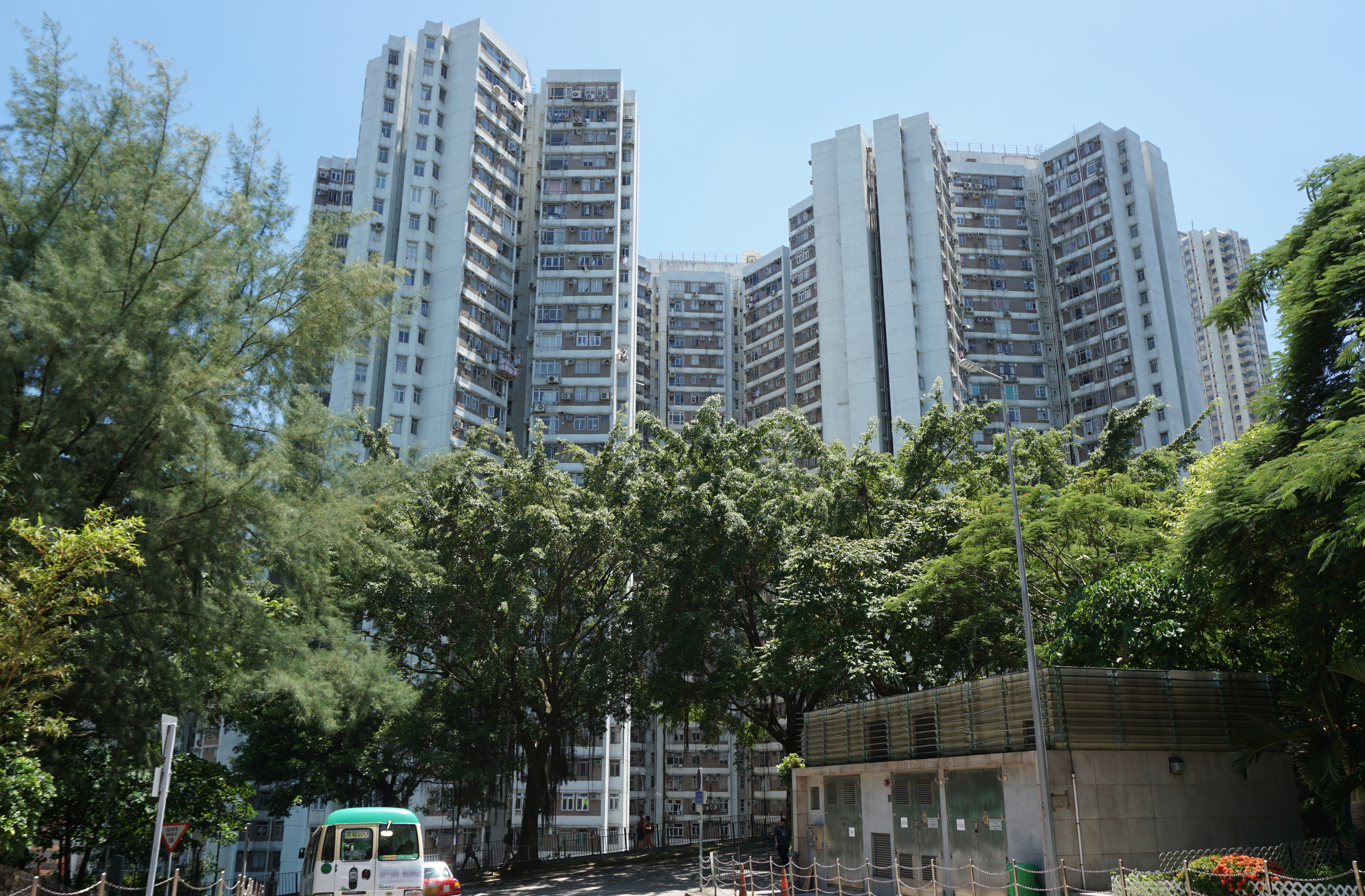
- Neptune Terrace
- Interactive map of Neptune Terrace

General information
- Location: 11-15 Tai Man Street, Chai Wan; Hong Kong Island, Hong Kong
- Coordinates: 22.268180°N 114.234160°E
- Status: Completed
- Category: Public rental housing
- No. of blocks: 3
- No. of units: 978

Construction
- Constructed: 1986; 40 years ago
- Contractors: New World Development
- Authority: Hong Kong Housing Authority

Neptune Terrace (Chinese: 樂翠臺) is a Home Ownership Scheme and Private Sector Participation Scheme court in Chai Wan, Hong Kong Island, Hong Kong near Greenwood Terrace and Pamela Youde Nethersole Eastern Hospital. It was jointly developed by the Hong Kong Housing Authority and New World Development and has a total of three residential blocks built in 1986.

== Houses ==
Name	Chinese name	Building type	Completed
Block 1	第1座	Private Sector Participation Scheme	1986
Block 2	第2座	Private Sector Participation Scheme	1986
Block 3	第3座	Private Sector Participation Scheme	1986

== Politics ==
Neptune Terrace is located in Lok Hong constituency of the Eastern District Council. It was formerly represented by Tsang Kin-shing, who was elected in the 2019 elections until July 2021.

== See also ==
- Public housing estates in Chai Wan and Siu Sai Wan
