= Ma Hang Estate =

Public housing estate in Stanley, Hong Kong

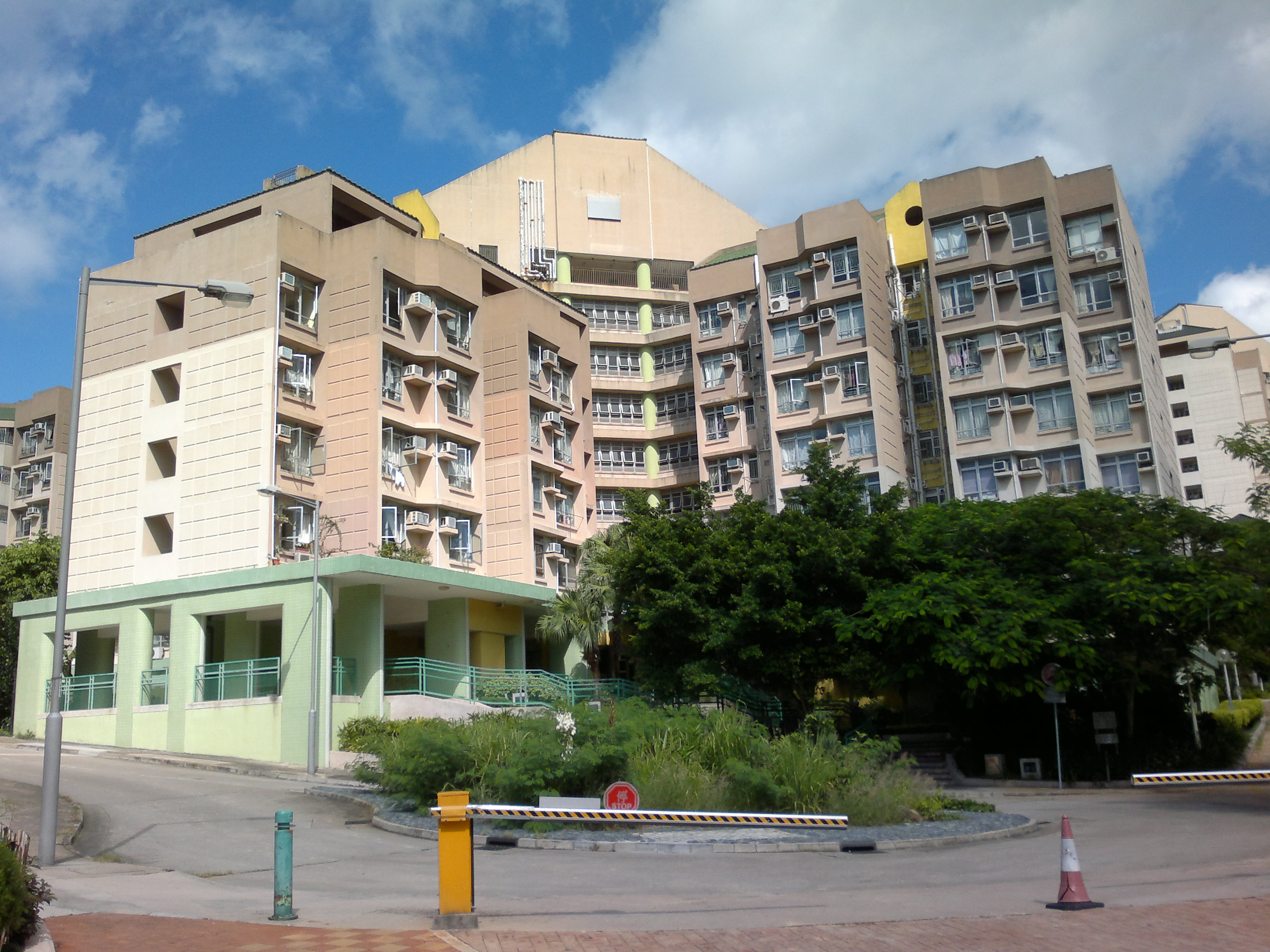
- Ma Hang Estate
- Interactive map of Ma Hang Estate

General information
- Location: 33 Carmel Road, Stanley; Hong Kong Island, Hong Kong
- Coordinates: 22.221439°N 114.206505°E
- Status: Completed
- Category: Public rental housing
- No. of blocks: 5
- No. of units: 900

Construction
- Constructed: 1993; 33 years ago
- Authority: Hong Kong Housing Authority

Ma Hang Estate (Chinese: 馬坑邨) is a public housing estate in Stanley, Hong Kong Island, Hong Kong. Formerly the site of Ma Hang Squatter Area, the estate is designed as "working village" and consists of five residential blocks completed between 1993 and 2000 for providing in-site rehousing for squatters. Stanley Plaza, Murray House and Blake Pier at Stanley are also the territories of Ma Hang Estate.

Lung Yan Court (Chinese: 龍欣苑) is a Home Ownership Scheme court in Stanley next to Ma Hang Estate. Formerly the site of Ma Hang Squatter Area, it has two residential blocks completed in 1993.

Lung Tak Court (Chinese: 龍德苑) is also a Home Ownership Scheme court in Stanley near Ma Hang Estate. It was originally planned for rental housing, but it was later converted to HOS court for sale. it consists of four residential blocks completed in 2000. Owners who have paid the land premium may rent their premises out in the open market. Apartments in this area offers an attractive alternative to living in the more built up areas like Wan Chai or North Point because there is much more greenery and open spaces around and buildings in Stanley are low rises. It is considered to be very convenient because it is located right next to Stanley Plaza and to the transport interchange.

== Houses ==
=== Ma Hang Estate ===
Name	Chinese name	Building type	Completed
Chun Ma House	駿馬樓	Harmony Rural 1	1993
Kin Ma House	健馬樓	Harmony Rural 1	1993
Koon Ma House	觀馬樓	Harmony Rural 1	1993
Leung Ma House	良馬樓	Harmony Rural 1	1993
Ying Ma House	迎馬樓	Harmony Rural 3	2000

=== Lung Yan Court ===
Name	Chinese name	Building type	Completed
Lung Chun House	龍駿閣	Harmony Rural 1	1993
Lung Tan House	龍騰閣	Harmony Rural 1	1993

=== Lung Tak Court ===
Name	Chinese name	Building type	Completed
Chun Tak House	晉德閣	Harmony Rural	2000
Shing Tak House	承德閣	Harmony Rural	2000
Chi Tak House	至德閣	Harmony Rural	2000
Yi Tak House	怡德閣	Harmony Rural	2000

== Politics ==
Ma Hang Estate, Lung Yan Court and Lung Tak Court are located in Stanley & Shek O constituency of the Southern District Council. It is currently represented by Michael Pang Cheuk-kei, who was elected in the 2019 elections.

== See also ==
- Stanley, Hong Kong
