= Hong Nga Court =

Home Ownership Scheme housing estate in Hong Kong

Hong Nga Court 康雅苑
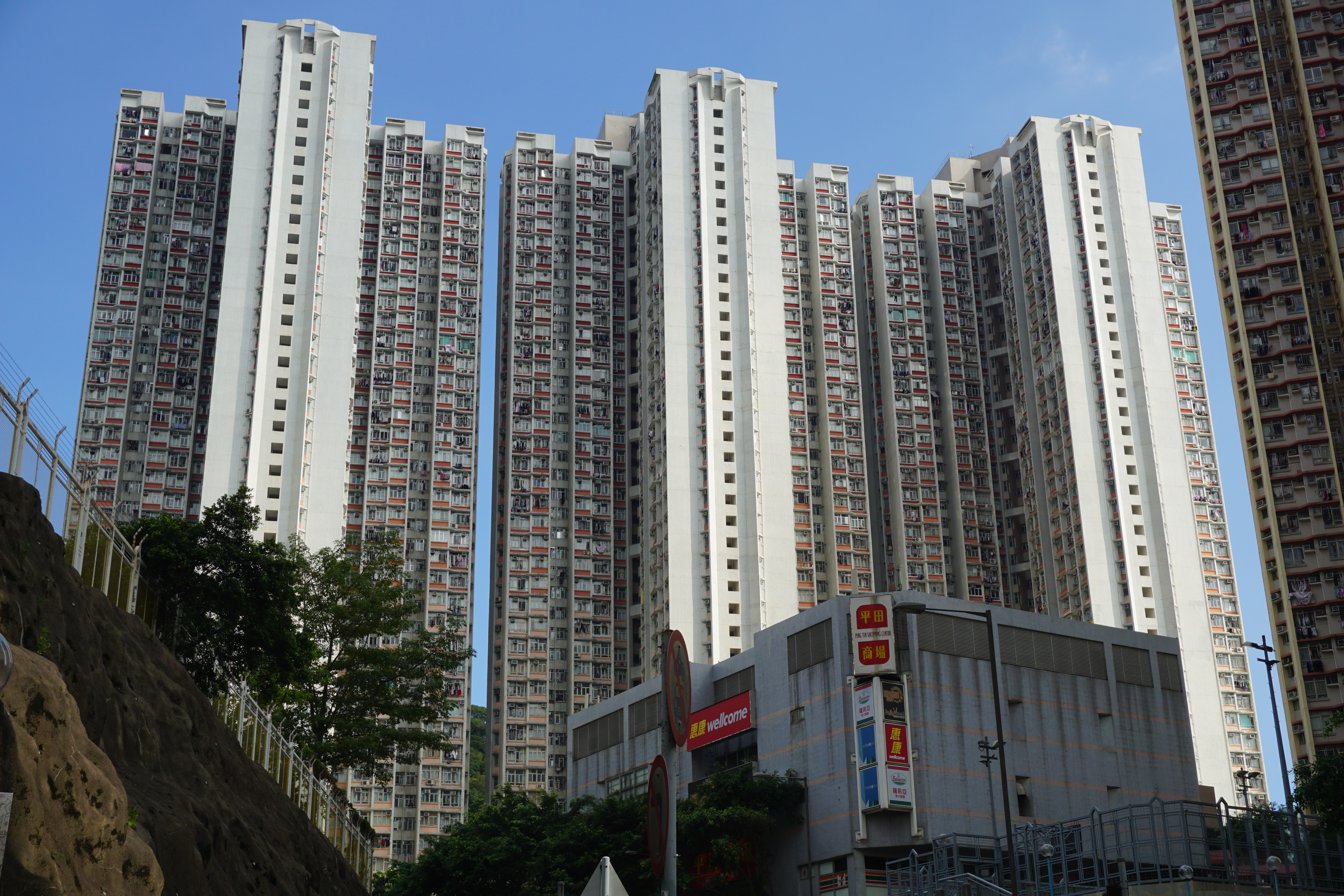
- Hong Nga Court
- Interactive map of Hong Nga Court 康雅苑

General information
- Location: 189 Pik Wan Road, Lam Tin, Kowloon, Hong Kong
- Coordinates: 22.305833°N 114.238056°E
- Status: Completed
- Category: Home Ownership Scheme (HOS)
- Population: 4,971 (2021)
- No. of blocks: 3
- No. of units: 1,824

Construction
- Constructed: 1993; 33 years ago
- Authority: Hong Kong Housing Authority

Listing
- Website: http://www.hongngacourt.com.hk

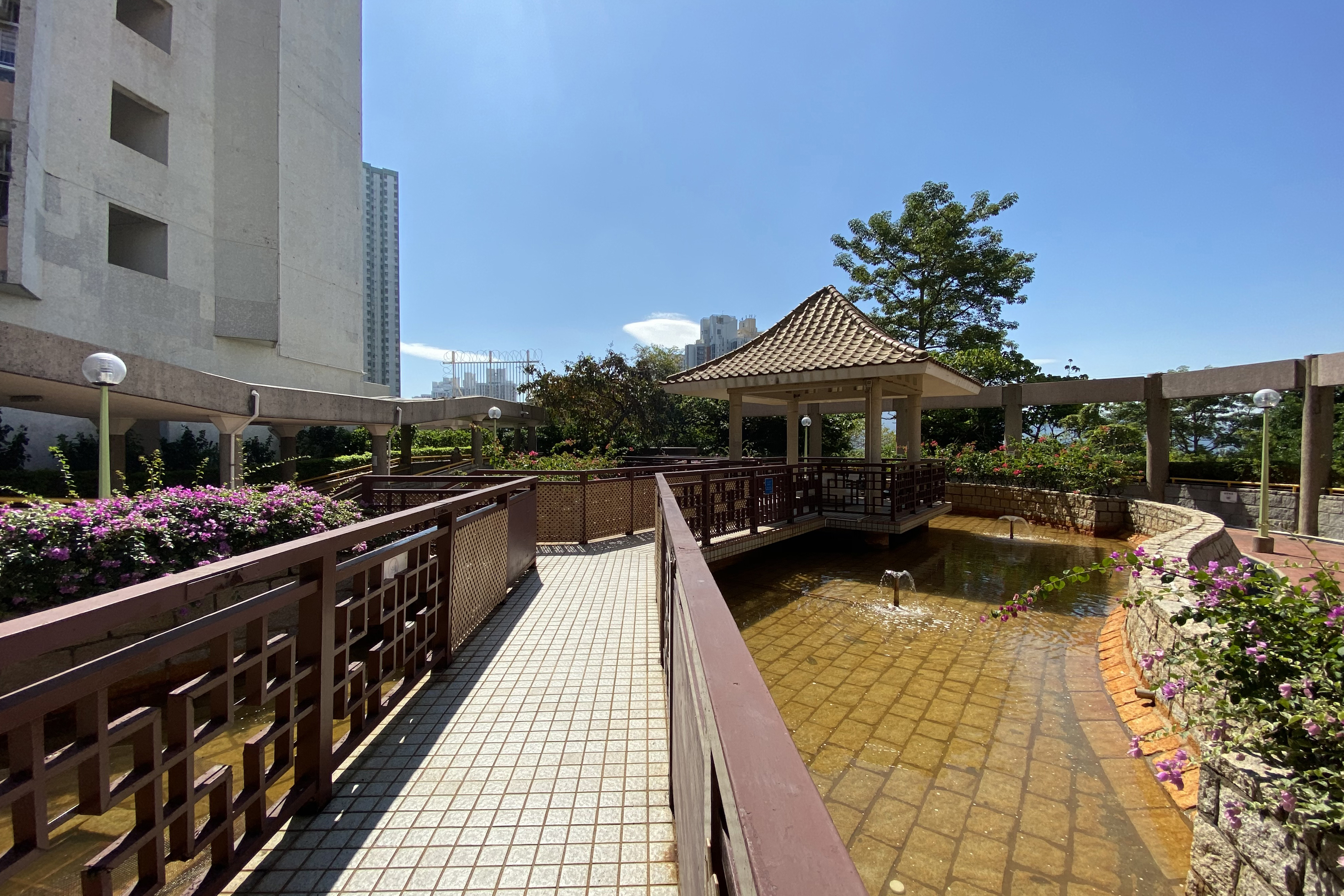
Pavilion and pond

Hong Nga Court (Chinese: 康雅苑) is Home Ownership Scheme court in Lam Tin, Kowloon, Hong Kong. It was developed by the Hong Kong Housing Authority and consists of 3 blocks. The court was inaugurated in 1993.

The court is located near the Lam Tin South Sports Centre, Lam Tin MTR Station and various shopping centres. The court is also located next to Tak Tin Estate, a mixed public/TPS estate. The three blocks of the court were originally planned to become block 9, 10, and 11 of this estate. This plan was later scrapped and flats were instead sold under the Home Ownership Scheme.

== History ==
Located on Pik Wan Road in Lam Tin, Hong Nga Court was inaugurated in 1993. It is built in the harmonious-style, which resembles the nearby public housing estates. It consists of three blocks, each with 38 floors, providing a total of 1,824 flats. Apartment sizes range from 430 to 600 square feet (gross leasable area of 593 to 889 square feet) and include designs with two small rooms, two large rooms, or three rooms. The housing estate lacks its own malls and gymnasium, and shares a mall with the neighboring Pin Tin Estate and community facilities with the surrounding Tak Tin Estate and Kwong Tin Estate. Higher-floor units offer views of Lei Yue Mun and Victoria Harbour, resulting in prices that are 10% higher than those of other units.

The housing estate began experiencing concrete spalling in 1999, six years after its inauguration, with more than 900 cases reported. Since it falls under the ten-year Structural Safety Guarantee, the owners' corporation wrote to the Hong Kong Housing Authority for compensation, but the Housing Authority rejected the claim, stating it was not a structural issue. This led residents to protest and seek assistance from the Kwun Tong District Council. In 2003, engineers were hired to inspect the building and confirmed that it had structural damage. The Housing Authority ultimately accepted the complaint through mediation in July 2006 and offered a lump sum of HKD$4.4 million for repairs, despite the estimated cost of the repair work being over HKD$10 million.

In May 2014, a man was shot dead by the police in the lobby of Block C, Hong Nga Court, during an argument with his wife, during which he threatened a security guard with a cutter knife. The Coroner's Court unanimously ruled that the deceased was lawfully killed.

From June to July 2017, the second-hand property market in Hong Kong experienced a significant decline; however, Hong Nga Court bucked this trend, recording a case where a property owner asked for a higher price, selling for HKD 5.8 million, setting a new high for the Green Form Subsidised Home Ownership Scheme in history.

In 2021, the Hong Kong Federation of Trade Unions urged the government to review the rates of the neighboring Hong Pak Court, citing that Hong Nga Court had a much higher property price but a lower rateable value. The court is currently managed by Shui On Properties Management Limited.

== Demographics ==
According to the 2021 census, Hong Nga Court had a population of 4,971.

== Politics ==
Hong Nga Court is part of the Kwun Tong Southeast District Council Geographical Constituency and Kowloon East Legislative Council General Election Geographical Constituency.

== Facilities ==
Hong Nga Court includes two children playground, a pavilion, and a pond.

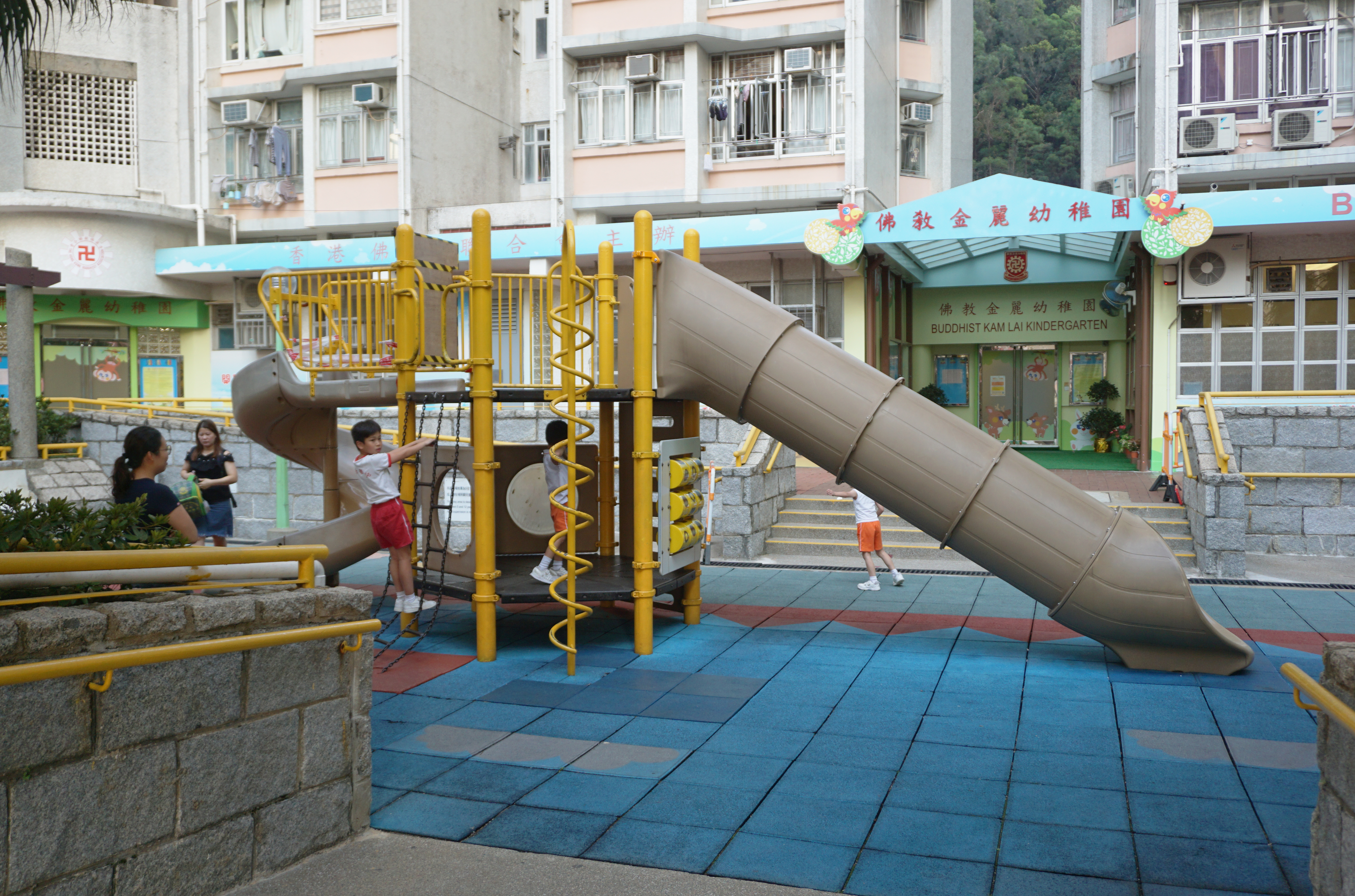
Children Playground

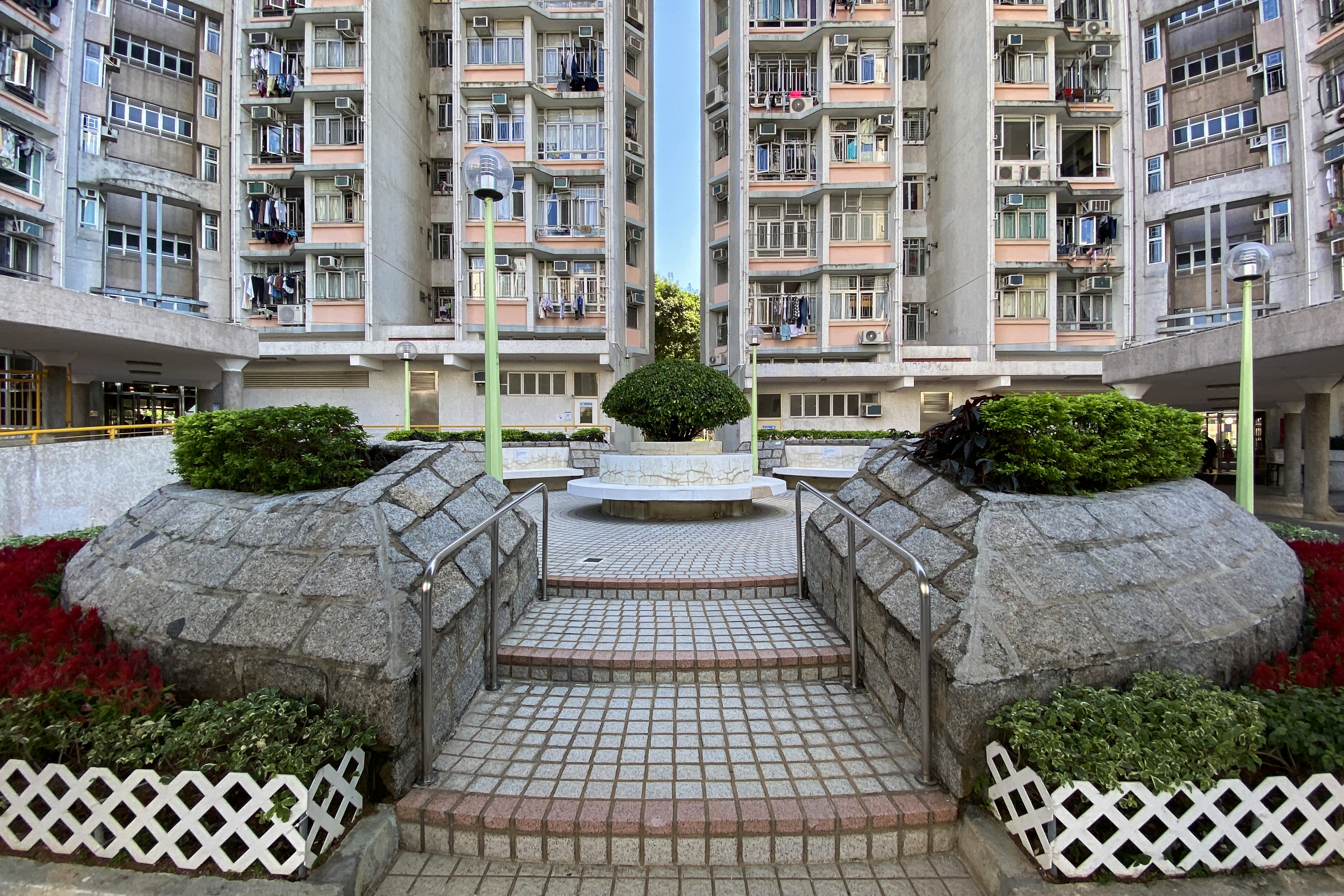
Garden

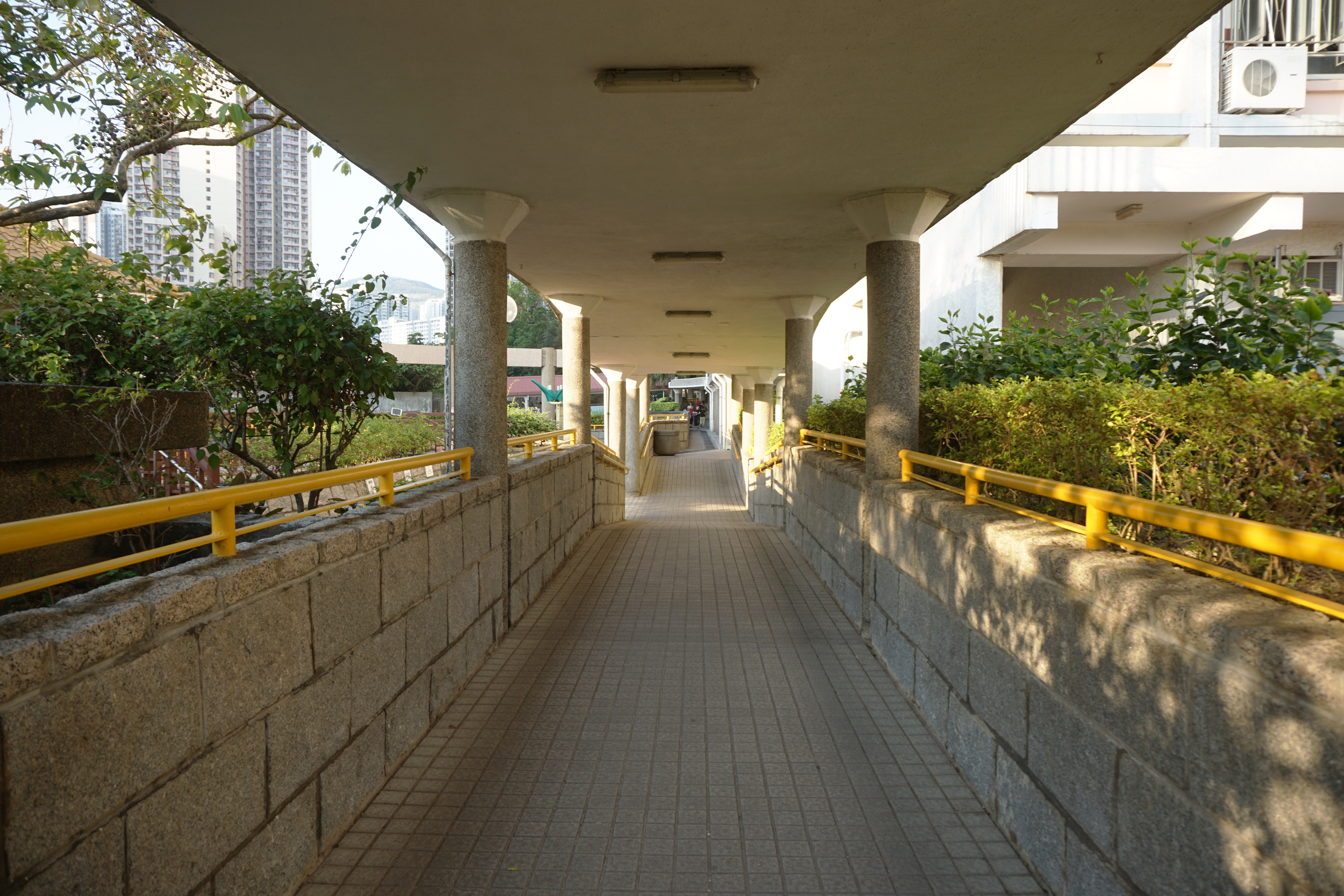
Covered walkway

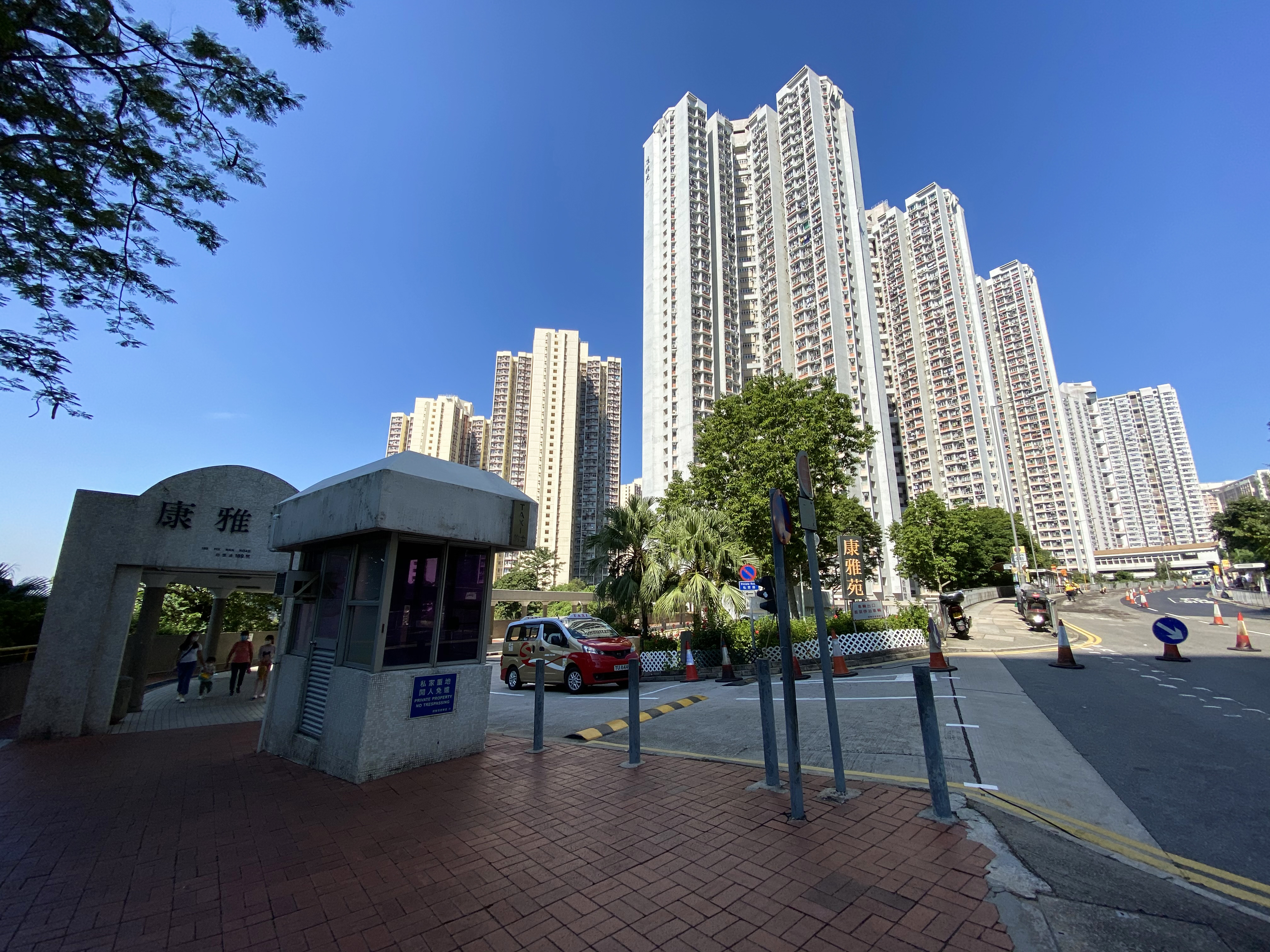
Car entrance to the court

== Transportation ==
Hong Nga Court is within 10-minutes walking distance of the Lam Tin MTR Station. It is also accessible by buses and minibuses.
