= Harmony Garden, Hong Kong =

Public housing estate in Siu Sai Wan, Hong Kong

Harmony Garden
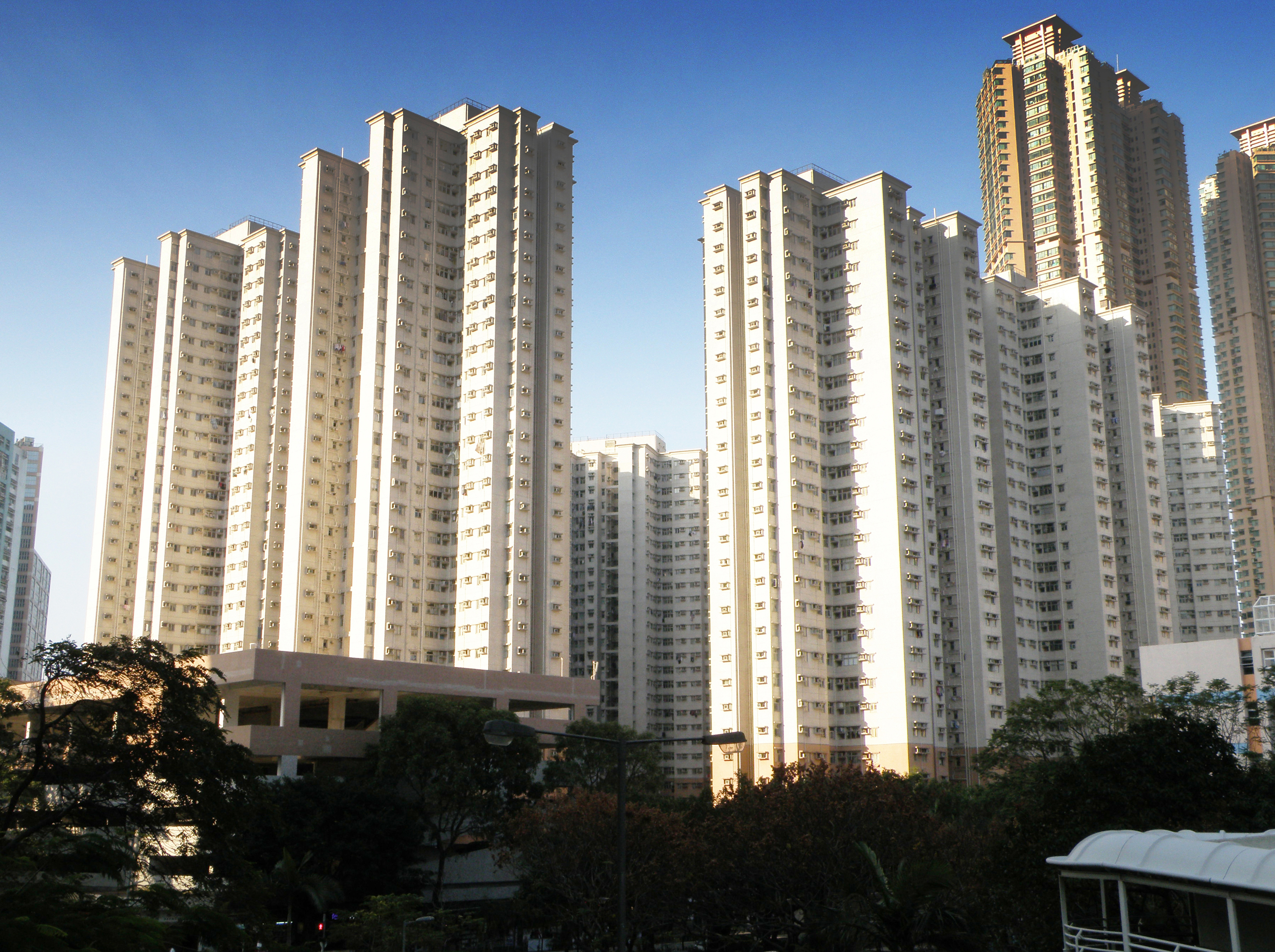
- Harmony Garden
- Interactive map of Harmony Garden

General information
- Location: 9 Siu Sai Wan Road, Siu Sai Wan; Hong Kong Island, Hong Kong
- Coordinates: 22.265410°N 114.248950°E
- Status: Completed
- Category: Home Ownership Scheme
- Population: 7,037 (2016)
- No. of blocks: 8
- No. of units: 2,340

Construction
- Constructed: 1997; 29 years ago
- Contractors: Chevalier Group
- Authority: Hong Kong Housing Authority

Harmony Garden (Chinese: 富欣花園) is a Home Ownership Scheme and Private Sector Participation Scheme court built on the reclaimed land in Siu Sai Wan, Hong Kong Island, Hong Kong near Siu Sai Wan Sports Ground, Siu Sai Wan Swimming Pool and Island Resort. It was jointly developed by the Hong Kong Housing Authority and Chevalier Group and has a total of eight residential blocks built in 1997.

== Houses ==
Name	Chinese name	Building type	Completed
Block 1	第1座	Private Sector Participation Scheme	1997
Block 2	第2座	Private Sector Participation Scheme	1997
Block 3	第3座	Private Sector Participation Scheme	1997
Block 4	第4座	Private Sector Participation Scheme	1997
Block 5	第5座	Private Sector Participation Scheme	1997
Block 6	第6座	Private Sector Participation Scheme	1997
Block 7	第7座	Private Sector Participation Scheme	1997
Block 8	第8座	Private Sector Participation Scheme	1997

== Demographics ==
According to the 2016 by-census, Harmony Garden had a population of 7,037. The median age was 46.6 and the majority of residents (95.8 per cent) were of Chinese ethnicity. The average household size was 3.2 people. The median monthly household income of all households (i.e. including both economically active and inactive households) was HK$38,800.

== Politics ==
Harmony Garden is located in Yan Lam constituency of the Eastern District Council. It was formerly represented by Alice Ishigami Lee Fung-king, who was elected in the 2019 elections until July 2021.

== Education ==
Harmony Garden is in Primary One Admission (POA) School Net 16. Within the school net are multiple aided schools (operated independently but funded with government money) and two government schools: Shau Kei Wan Government Primary School and Aldrich Bay Government Primary School.

== See also ==
- Public housing estates in Chai Wan and Siu Sai Wan
