= Citizens' Radio =

- Hong Kong

Programming
- Language: Cantonese

History
- First air date: 3 October 2005
- Last air date: 30 June 2023

Links
- Website: citizensradio.org

Citizens' Radio
- Traditional Chinese: 民間電台
Transcriptions
Yue: Cantonese
- Yale Romanization: Màhn gāan dihn tòih
- Jyutping: Man4 gaan1 din6 toi4

Citizens' Radio was a radio station in Hong Kong established by pro-democracy figure Tsang Kin Shing. The station ran as a non-profit organisation. It started trial broadcasting on 3 October 2005 on 102.8 MHz FM. The regular broadcasting hours were 7:00 pm–12:00 pm from Monday to Friday. The station ceased to operate on 30 June 2023, with Tsang saying that the station had had trouble inviting guests in view of "so many red lines" — an apparent reference to national security legislation — enacted in 2020, and that due to the blocking of a bank account for receiving donations, the station would be unable to pay rent beyond August.

== Purpose ==
The principle of the station is "Be open and bravely speak out", so the main type of programming is a speech-based "phone-in" format. Sometimes Hong Kong legislators are invited as special guests. The station has also made live broadcasts of the Hong Kong 1 July marches and Vindicate 4 June and Relay Torch in the past.

Tsang submitted an application for a broadcasting licence to the Broadcasting Authority, but the application was rejected by the government on December 12, 2006. This effectively made Citizens Radio's broadcasts illegal. On 29 August 2006, with a court search warrant, the Office of the Telecommunications Authority forced the station to close down, but the station resumed broadcasting on 4 October 2006. The station was repeatedly raided by the Telecommunications Authority since but it kept on broadcasting as a form of civil disobedience.

== Citizens' Radio broadcast incident ==
=== Event ===
On 25 May 2007, Szeto Wah was speaking in a Mong Kok pedestrianised street hosted by Citizen's Radio. The topic of the programme involved the Tiananmen Square protests of 1989.

=== Charges ===
Eight people including Szeto Wah were prosecuted. According to the summons, Szeto was using unlicensed radio equipment when delivering the political message. Only the chief executive or the director general of the Telecommunications Authority have the power to approve licences for such equipment.

=== Selective prosecution ===
Szeto said he was discriminated against for this event, and had appeared on the same station before without being charged. Other members who have spoken on the radio station included Anthony Cheung Bing Leung and legislator Choy So-yuk of the pro-Beijing Democratic Alliance for the Betterment of Hong Kong. They were not charged. Leung Kwok-hung (Longhair) added that this is "selective prosecution". Mak Yin-ting (麥燕婷), general secretary of the Hong Kong Journalists Association have said "Everything is subject to government discretion. The government can grant or deny you a licence as long as it wishes. It is not in accordance with the rule of law."

=== Others ===
After the prosecution, Hong Kong's Secretary for Justice Wong Yan Lung slumped to a six-month low in public confidence.

The latest case follows an ongoing lawsuit in which Tsang and Leung are arguing that the Telecommunications Ordinance, specifically the granting of broadcasting licences, was unconstitutional.

== Post charges broadcasts ==
- On 20 April 2008, the station made a broadcast in Mong Kok after a three months break. It was hosted by radio founder Tsang Kin-shing. He was joined by veteran pro-democracy activist Szeto Wah and chairman of the League of Social Democrats Wong Yuk-man. Five other legislators also took part in the unlicensed broadcast.
- On 4 May 2008, another public broadcast was made at Times Square.

== Court ==
- On 8 Jan 2008 the ruling by magistrate Douglas Yau Tak-hong (游德康) said certain provisions of the broadcasting law in the Telecommunication Ordinance were unconstitutional.
- On 23 May 2008 six lawmakers and five democracy activists appeared in Eastern district court. The case was adjourned until 15 October 2008 waiting for the ruling of Douglas Yau.

English name (jyutping or pinyin depending on media coverage)	Chinese name	Representing
Lee Cheuk-yan	李卓人	Hong Kong Confederation of Trade Unions
Emily Lau Wai-hing	劉慧卿	The Frontier
Lee Wing-tat	李永達	Democratic party
Fernando Cheung	張超雄	Civic Party
Albert Chan	陳偉業	League of Social Democrats
Leung Kwok-hung	梁國雄	League of Social Democrats
Tsang Kin-shing	曾健成	Activists, founder of station
Lo Hom-chau	羅就	Activists
Yang Kuang	楊匡	Activists
Ko Wah-bing	柯華	Activists
Poon Tat-keung	潘達強	Activists

- On 10 Sept 2008 the rulings by magistrate Douglas Yau were heard in the Court of Appeal.
- On 12 Dec 2008 the Hong Kong government won its appeal against the dismissal of charges against Citizens' Radio activists for broadcasting without a licence.

== Raid ==
The Office of the Telecommunications Authority (OFTA) mounted an enforcement operation against Citizens' Radio and raided the radio equipment on 19 December 2008. Activist Tsang Kin-shing said the equipment was worth HK$20,000 to HK$30,000.
