= Lok Hong (constituency) =

Hong Kong constituency

- Elected constituency for the Eastern District Council
- Boundary of Lok Hong in Eastern District
- District: Eastern
- Legislative Council constituency: Hong Kong Island East
- Population: 12,685 (2019)
- Electorate: 8,595 (2019)

Current constituency
- Created: 1994
- Number of members: One
- Member: Vacant
- Created from: A Kung Ngam; Shau Kei Wan; Chai Wan West; Chai Wan Central

Lok Hong (Chinese: 樂康) is one of the 35 constituencies in the Eastern District, Hong Kong.

The constituency returns one district councillor to the Eastern District Council, with an election every four years. The seat was last held by Tsang Kin-shing of the LSD party since the 2019 election.

Lok Hong constituency is loosely based on the Shan Tsui Court, Neptune Terrace and Greenwood Terrace in Chai Wan with estimated population of 12,685.

== Councillors represented ==
Election	Member	Party
1994	Tsang Kin-shing	Democratic
1999	Chan Tat-keung	DAB
2003	Tsang Kin-shing	Independent
2006	Tsang Kin-shing	LSD
2011	Li Chun-chau	Independent
2019	Tsang Kin-shing→Vacant (Note: Resigned on 8 July 2021.)	LSD

== Election results ==
=== 2010s ===
Eastern District Council Election, 2019: Lok Hong
Party	Candidate	Votes	%	±%
LSD	Tsang Kin-shing	3,563	56.00	+11.40
Nonpartisan	Li Chun-chau	2,800	44.00	−10.30
Majority		763	12.00	
Turnout		6,387	74.32	
LSD gain from Independent		Swing		

Eastern District Council Election, 2015: Lok Hong
Party	Candidate	Votes	%	±%
Nonpartisan	Li Chun-chau	2,396	54.3	+4.1
LSD	Tsang Kin-shing	1,969	44.6	–4.4
Nonpartisan	Lun Man-kit	48	1.1	
Majority		427	9.7	
Turnout		4,466	55.3	
Independent hold		Swing	+4.3	

Eastern District Council Election, 2011: Lok Hong
Party	Candidate	Votes	%	±%
Independent	Li Chun-chau	1,916	50.2	
LSD	Tsang Kin-shing	1,871	49.0	−7.8
Independent	Lui Sin-yi	32	0.8	
Independent gain from LSD		Swing		

=== 2000s ===
Eastern District Council Election, 2007: Lok Hong
Party	Candidate	Votes	%	±%
LSD	Tsang Kin-shing	1,912	56.8	−4.8
DAB	Wong Ka-wai	1,454	43.2	
LSD hold		Swing		

Eastern District Council Election, 2003: Lok Hong
Party	Candidate	Votes	%	±%
Independent	Tsang Kin-shing	1,481	52.0	+7.1
Independent	Judy Tong Kei-yuk	1,184	41.6	
Independent	Lai Pit-shing	182	6.4	
Independent gain from DAB		Swing		

=== 1990s ===
Eastern District Council Election, 1999: Lok Hong
Party	Candidate	Votes	%	±%
DAB	Chan Tat-keung	1,271	54.8	
Democratic	Tsang Kin-shing	1,042	44.9	−19.5
DAB gain from Democratic		Swing		

Eastern District Board Election, 1994: Lok Hong
Party	Candidate	Votes	%	±%
Democratic	Tsang Kin-shing	1,195	64.4	
Liberal	Chung Siu-king	630	34.0	
Democratic win (new seat)				
