= Greenwood Terrace =

Public housing estate in Chai Wan, Hong Kong

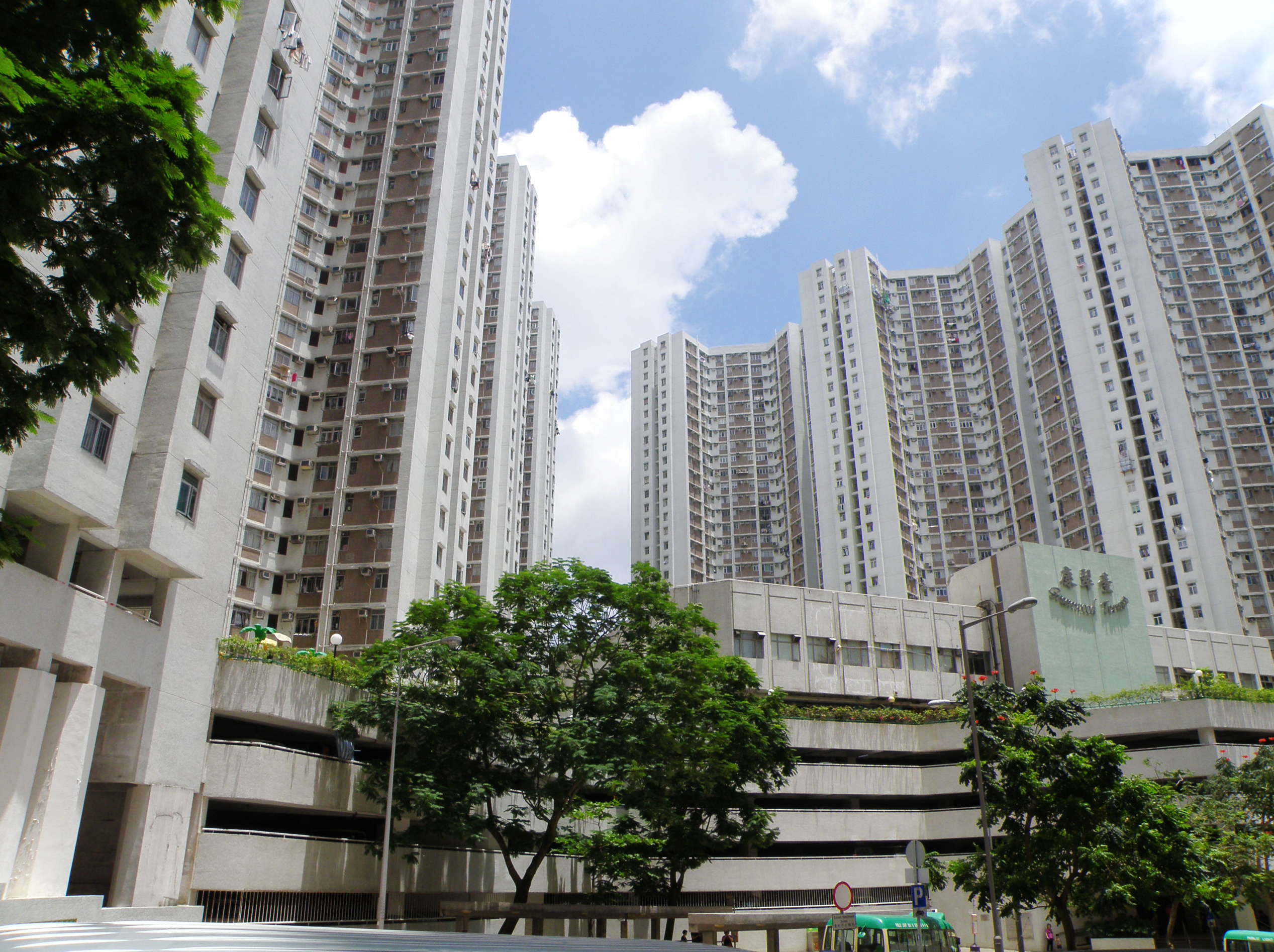
- Greenwood Terrace
- Interactive map of Greenwood Terrace

General information
- Location: 2-14 Tai Man Street, Chai Wan; Hong Kong Island, Hong Kong
- Coordinates: 22.267120°N 114.234768°E
- Status: Completed
- Category: Home Ownership Scheme
- Population: 6,342 (2016)
- No. of blocks: 7
- No. of units: 2,100

Construction
- Constructed: 1985; 41 years ago
- Contractors: New World Development
- Authority: Hong Kong Housing Authority

Greenwood Terrace (Chinese: 康翠臺) is a Home Ownership Scheme and Private Sector Participation Scheme court in Chai Wan, Hong Kong Island, Hong Kong near Chai Wan Division Police Station. It was jointly developed by the Hong Kong Housing Authority and New World Development, and has a total of seven residential blocks built in 1985 and is one of the largest estates in Chai Wan.

== Houses ==
| Name | Chinese name | Building type | Completed |
|---|---|---|---|
| Tower 1 | 第1座 | Private Sector Participation Scheme | 1985 |
| Tower 2 | 第2座 | Private Sector Participation Scheme | 1985 |
| Tower 3 | 第3座 | Private Sector Participation Scheme | 1985 |
| Tower 4 | 第4座 | Private Sector Participation Scheme | 1985 |
| Tower 5 | 第5座 | Private Sector Participation Scheme | 1985 |
| Tower 6 | 第6座 | Private Sector Participation Scheme | 1985 |
| Tower 7 | 第7座 | Private Sector Participation Scheme | 1985 |

== Demographics ==
According to the 2016 by-census, Greenwood Terrace had a population of 6,342. The median age was 45.6 and the majority of residents (93.9 per cent) were of Chinese ethnicity. The average household size was 3.2 people. The median monthly household income of all households (i.e. including both economically active and inactive households) was HK$43,000.

== Politics ==
Greenwood Terrace is located in Lok Hong constituency of the Eastern District Council. It was formerly represented by Tsang Kin-shing, who was elected in the 2019 elections until July 2021.

== See also ==
- Public housing estates in Chai Wan and Siu Sai Wan
