= Kwong Yuen Estate =

Housing estate in Sha Tin, New Territories

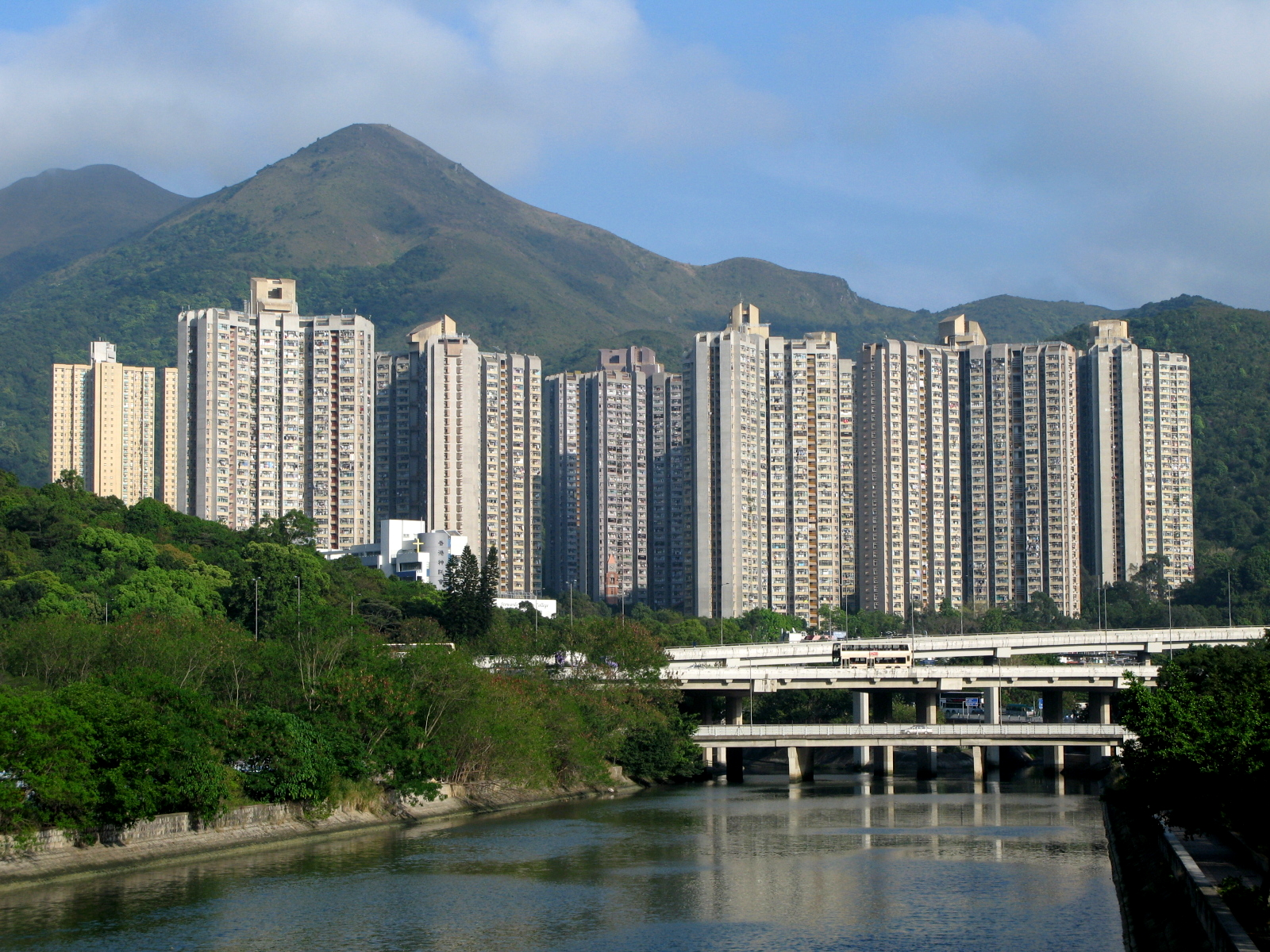
- Kwong Yuen Estate
- Interactive map of Kwong Yuen Estate

General information
- Location: 68 Siu Lek Yuen Road, Siu Lek Yuen; Sha Tin, New Territories; Hong Kong
- Coordinates: 22.3811°N 114.2154°E
- Status: Completed
- Category: Tenants Purchase Scheme
- Population: 21,255 (2016)
- No. of blocks: 12

Construction
- Authority: Hong Kong Housing Authority

Kwong Yuen Estate
- Traditional Chinese: 廣源邨
- Simplified Chinese: 广源邨
- Cantonese Yale: gwóng yùhn chyūn
- Literal meaning: broad river estate
Transcriptions
Yue: Cantonese
- Yale Romanization: gwóng yùhn chyūn
- Jyutping: gwong2 jyun4 cyun1

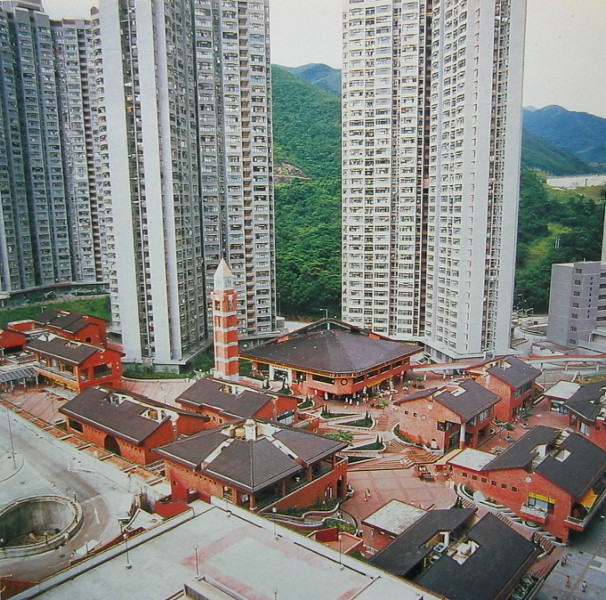
Kwong Yuen Estate

Kwong Yuen Estate (Chinese: 廣源邨) is a public housing estate and Tenants Purchase Scheme estate in Siu Lek Yuen, Sha Tin, Hong Kong. Unlike other public estates in Sha Tin, Kwong Yuen Estate is built on sloping platform, instead of reclaimed land. In 2001, some of the flats were sold to the tenants through Tenants Purchase Scheme Phase 4.

Kwong Lam Court (Chinese: 廣林苑) and Hong Lam Court (Chinese: 康林苑) are the Home Ownership Scheme courts within Kwong Yuen Estate. They have three blocks each, and were both completed in 1990.

== History ==
The estate was built as part of the development of Sha Tin New Town. Unlike most of the new town, the estate site was not reclaimed from Tide Cove, as it is located on a hillside. The site was used for agriculture until the early 1980s. It was cleared and re-graded in 1984 and 1985.

Kwong Yuen Estate was the eleventh public housing estate in Sha Tin, and was developed in phases. The contract to construct the first phase, valued at HK$205.67 million, was signed on 24 February 1986. The contract covered the construction of four 35-storey "Trident" residential blocks, a primary school, a community hall, and roads.

Kwong Yuen Community Hall, operated by the Sha Tin District Office, opened to the public on 15 January 1990.

== Demographics ==
According to the 2011 census, Kwong Yuen Estate has a population of 13,908. Kwong Lam Court and Hong Lam Court house 5,272 and 3,062 respectively. Altogether the population amounts to 22,242.

According to 2016 Population By-census, Kwong Yuen Estate has a population of 12,835. Kwong Lam Court and Hong Lam Court house 5,285 and 3,135 respectively. Altogether the population amounts to 21,255.

== Houses ==
=== Kwong Yuen Estate ===
| Name | Chinese name | Type | Completion |
|---|---|---|---|
| Pine House | 廣松樓 | Trident 4 | 1989 |
| Oak House | 廣橡樓 | Trident 4 | 1989 |
| Banyan House | 廣榕樓 | Trident 4 | 1989 |
| Cypress House | 廣柏樓 | Trident 4 | 1989 |
| Kapok House | 廣棉樓 | Trident 3 | 1989 |
| Alder House | 廣楊樓 | Trident 3 | 1989 |

=== Kwong Lam Court ===
| Name | Chinese name | Type | Completion |
|---|---|---|---|
| Hing Lam House | 興林閣 | Trident 4 | 1990 |
| Mau Lam House | 茂林閣 | Trident 4 | 1990 |
| Fook Lam House | 馥林閣 | Trident 4 | 1990 |

=== Hong Lam Court ===
Hong Lam Court is adjacent to two government quarters, Yee King House and Hoi Wan House, which were developed at the same time as Hong Lam Court by the Hong Kong Housing Authority but are not included in the below table.

| Name | Chinese name | Type | Completion |
|---|---|---|---|
| Shan Lam House | 山林閣 | NCB (Ver.1984) | 1990 |
| Yuen Lam House | 園林閣 | NCB (Ver.1984) | 1990 |
| King Lam House | 景林閣 | NCB (Ver.1984) | 1990 |

== Commercial complex ==
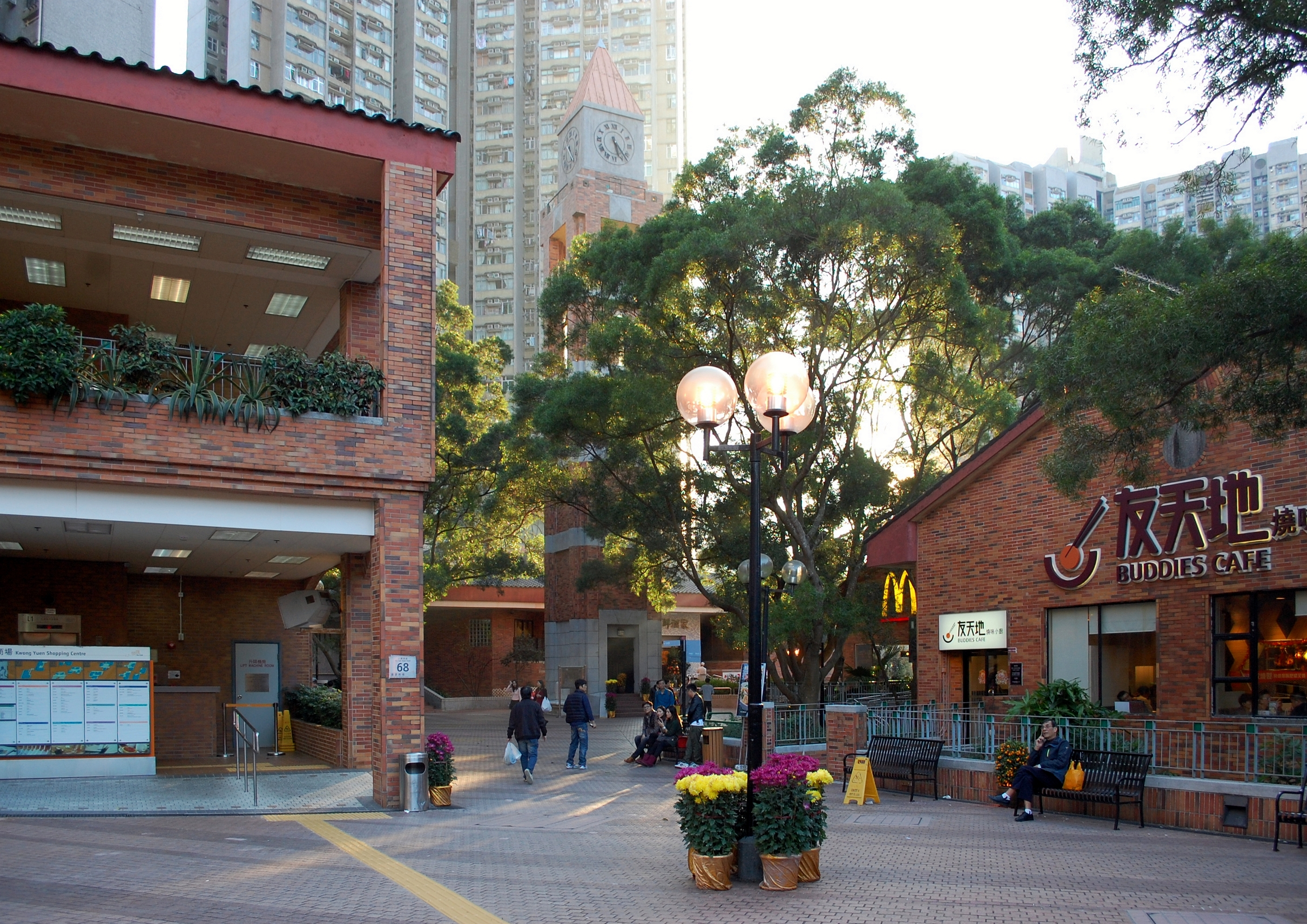
A view of the commercial complex with clock tower

The design of the commercial complex of the estate was designed to blend into the village environment in the vicinity. Unlike the commercial centres of other public housing estates, the complex consists of five two-level blocks which are standing on two platforms. The complex slopes from the east to the west to a difference of 15 m. A 26 m clock tower reinforces the image of the commercial complex.

In 1992, the design of the commercial complex won a Certificate of Merit in the annual design competition organised by the Hong Kong Institute of Architects.

== See also ==
- List of public housing estates in Hong Kong
- Public housing in Hong Kong
