= Sui Wo Court =

Public housing estate in Hong Kong

Coordinates: 22.393075°N 114.194066°E

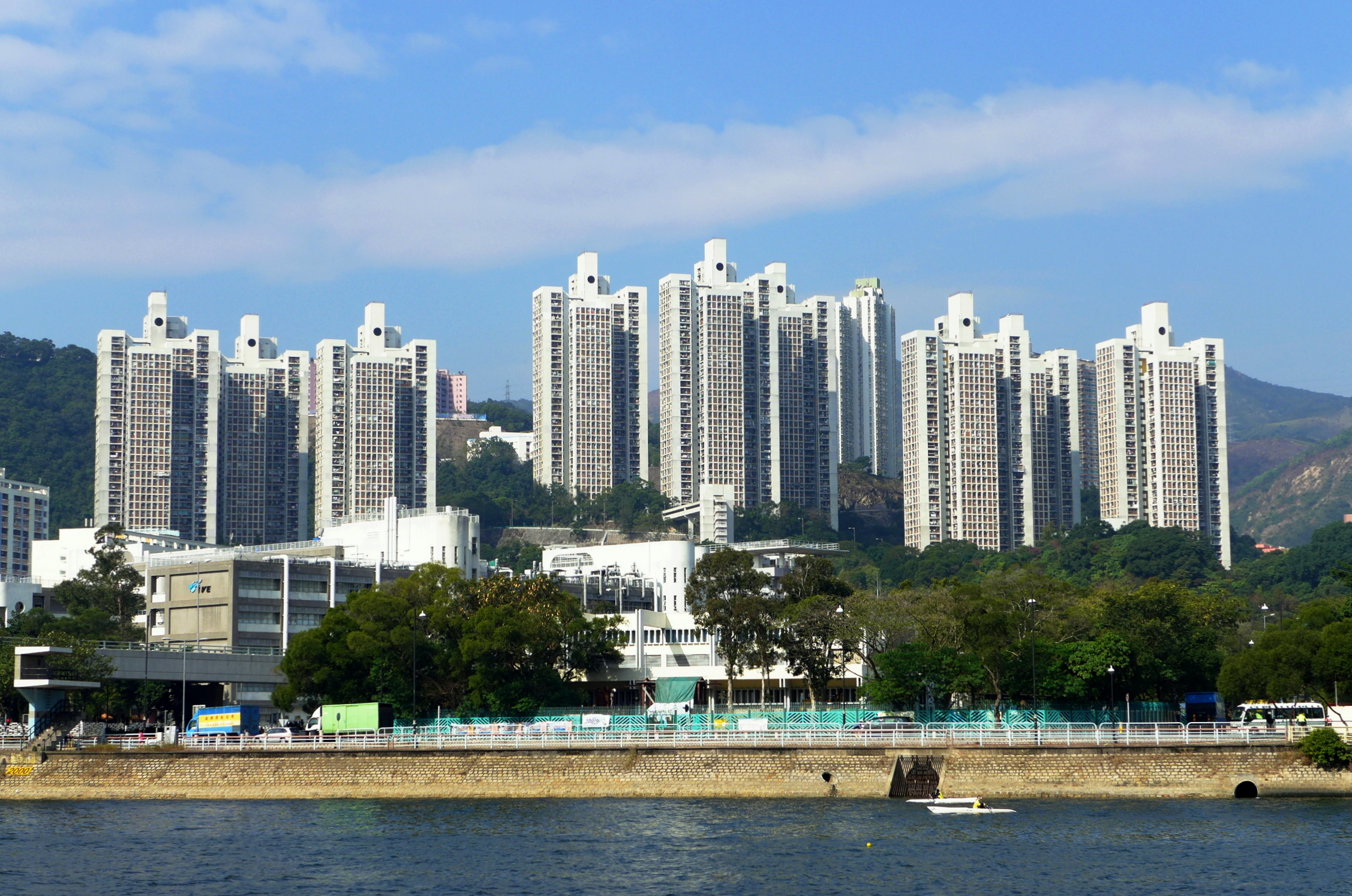
Sui Wo Court

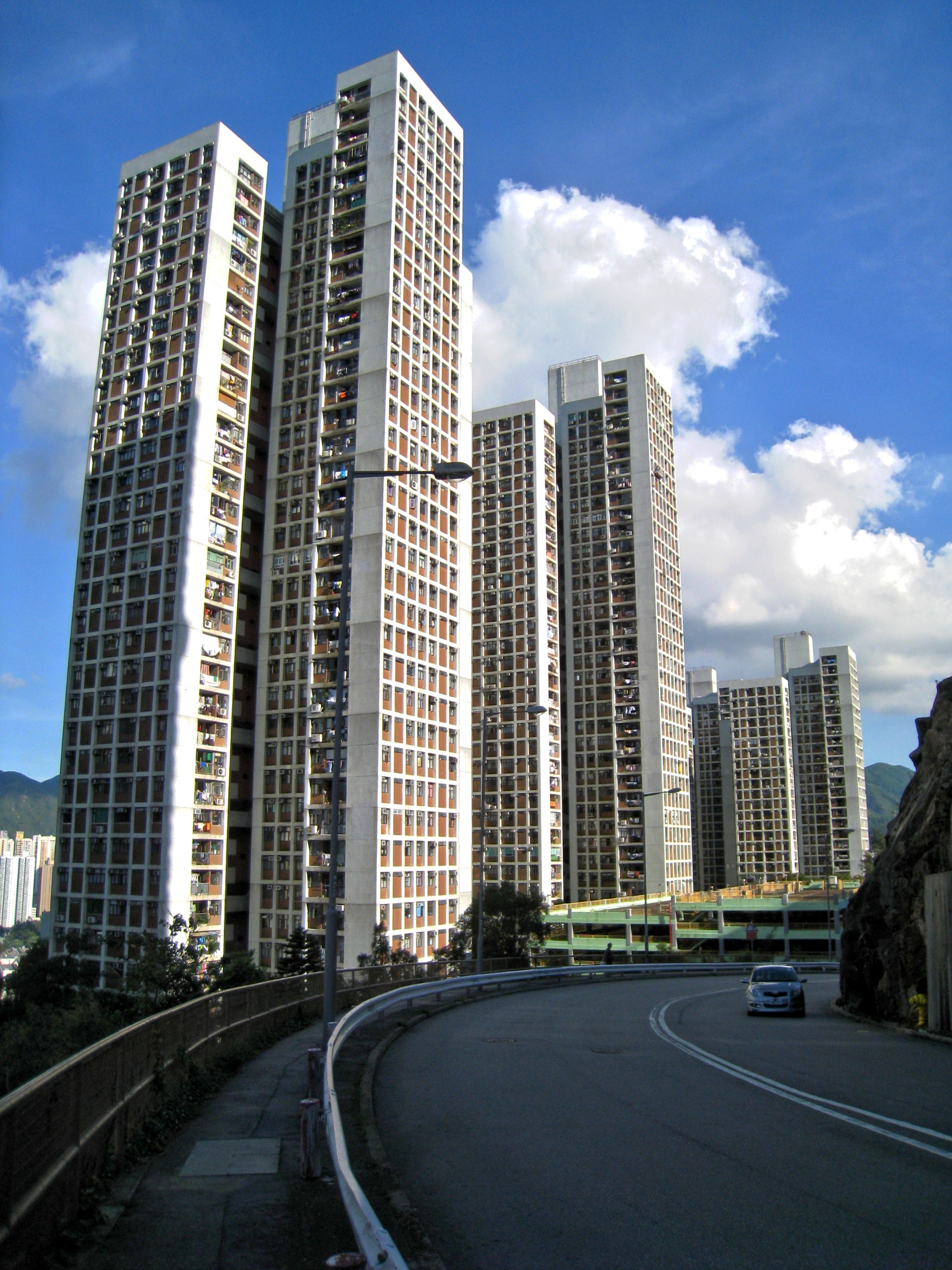
Blocks of Sui Wo Court

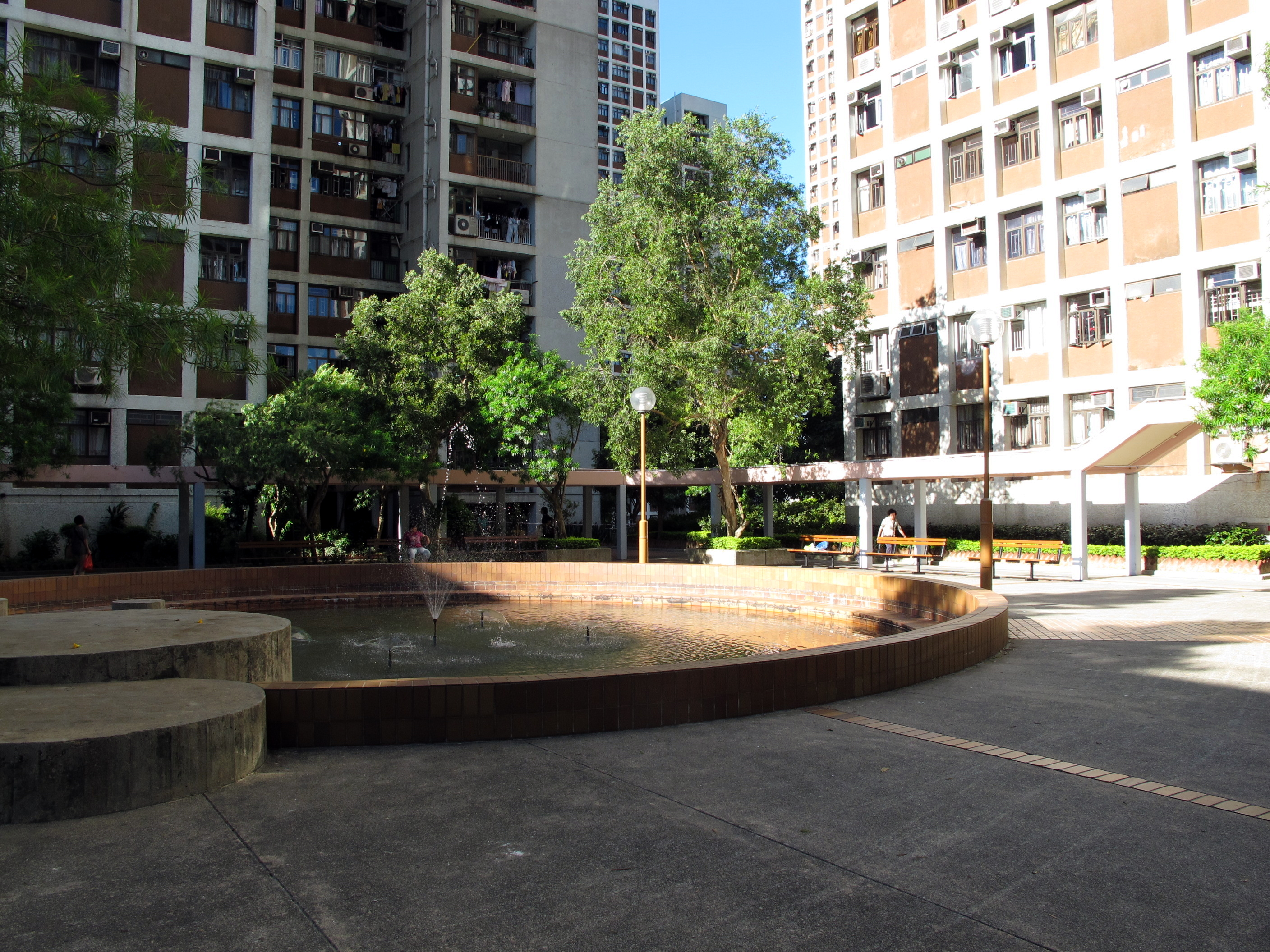
Garden inside Sui Wo Court

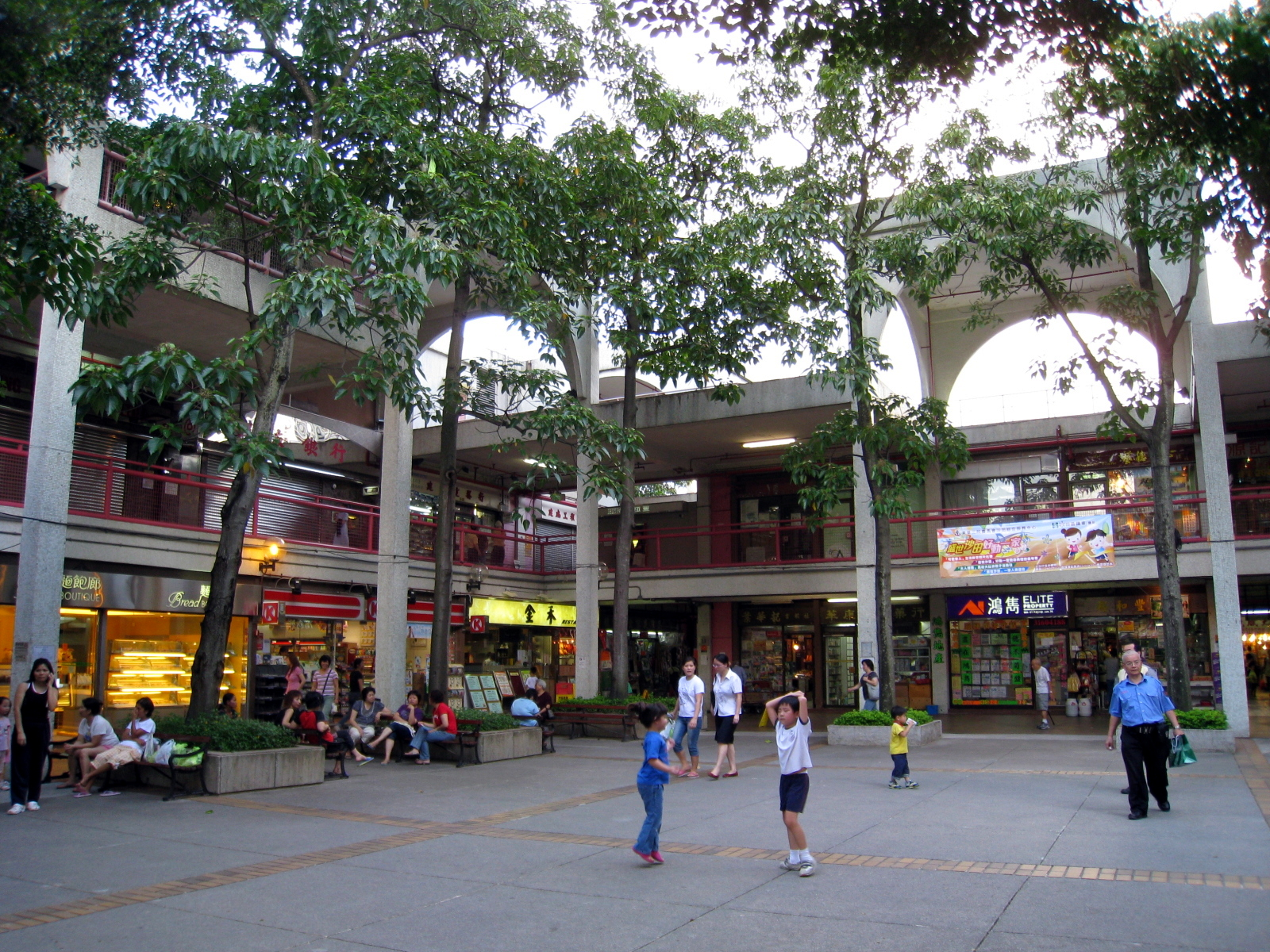
Sui Wo Court Commercial Centre

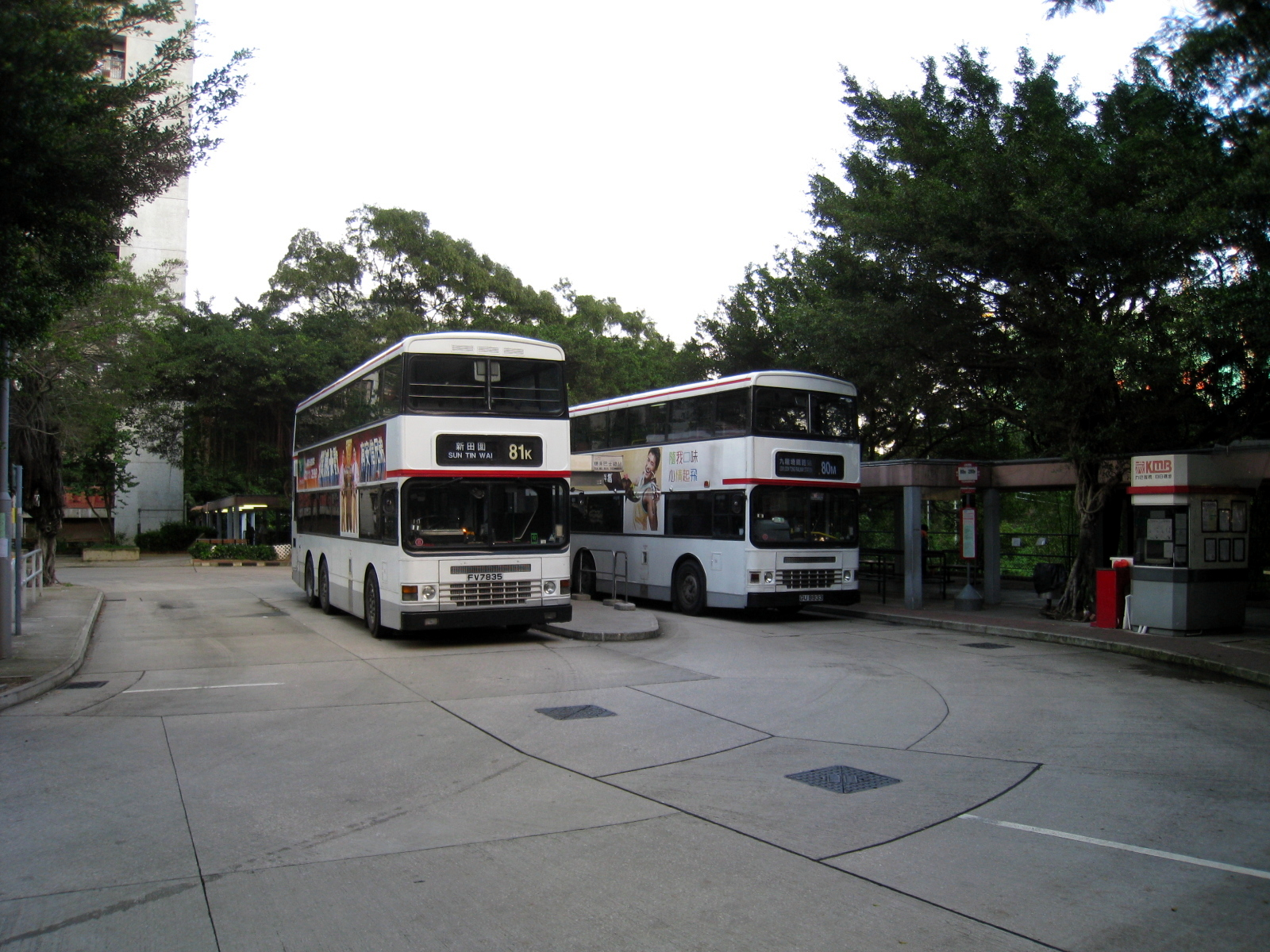
Sui Wo Court Bus Terminal

Sui Wo Court (Chinese: 穗禾苑) is one of the first estates under Home Ownership Scheme. It is located in Fo Tan, Sha Tin District, Hong Kong.

Built in 1980, it is located on a mountain above Wo Che and east of central Fo Tan, northwest of Sha Tin. The court was designed by Palmer and Turner and received a Silver Medal at the 1981 Hong Kong Institute of Architects Annual Awards. The scenery of Sha Tin and Tolo Harbour is visible from the estate.

== Blocks ==
Completed in 1980, it offers 3,501 flats for sale. It consists of 9 blocks of cross type(special):

- Block A - Fung Yue House
- Block B - Fung Yat House
- Block C - Fung Lin House
- Block D - Hing Wan House
- Block E - Hing Sing House
- Block F - Hing On House
- Block G - Wing Mau House
- Block H - Wing Cheung House
- Block J - Wing Hing House

Floor area of Flats ranged from 43 – 65 m^{2} with saleable area between 38 – 57 m^{2}. Its initial sale price was between 100,200 and 252,700 Hong Kong dollars.

== Transport ==
The estate has its own bus terminus beside the commercial centre. The government is also considering building an escalator link between Sui Wo Court and Fo Tan station.

== See also ==
- List of Home Ownership Scheme Courts in Hong Kong
