= Tsang Kin-shing =

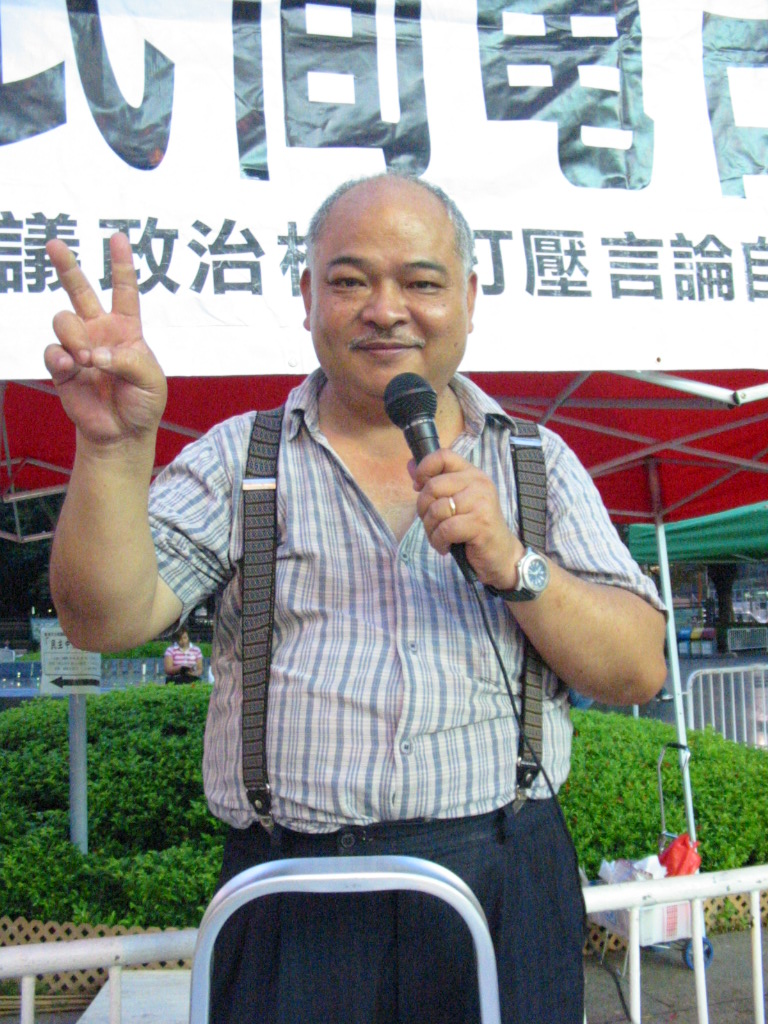
Tsang Kin-shing in a fundraising campaign

Tsang Kin-shing (Chinese: 曾健成; born 1957), also known by his nickname "The Bull", is a Hong Kong politician who formerly served as a member of the Legislative Council and later the Eastern District Council. He is most well known as the founder of the controversial Citizens' Radio. He is also a member of the League of Social Democrats.

== Arrest ==
On 8 December 2020, Tsang was arrested for his alleged involvement in the unauthorized 1 July march that year. Seven other democrats were arrested the same day on similar charges.

Political offices
New constituency	Member of Eastern District Board; Representative for Lok Hong; 1994–1999	Succeeded by Chan Tat-keung
Preceded by Chan Tat-keung	Member of Eastern District Council; Representative for Lok Hong; 2004–2011	Succeeded by Li Chun-chau
Preceded by Li Chun-chau	Member of Eastern District Council; Representative for Lok Hong; 2020–2021	Vacant
Legislative Council of Hong Kong
New constituency	Member of Legislative Council; Representative for Agriculture, Fisheries, Mining, Energy and Construction; 1995–1997	Replaced by Provisional Legislative Council
