= Home Ownership Scheme =

Public housing ownership programme in Hong Kong

- Traditional Chinese: 居者有其屋計劃
- Simplified Chinese: 居者有其屋计划
Transcriptions
Standard Mandarin
- Hanyu Pinyin: Jū Zhě Yǒu Qí Wū Jìhuà
Yue: Cantonese
- Yale Romanization: Gēui jé yáuh kèih ūk gai waahk
- Jyutping: Geoi1 ze2 jau5 kei4 uk1 gai3 waak6

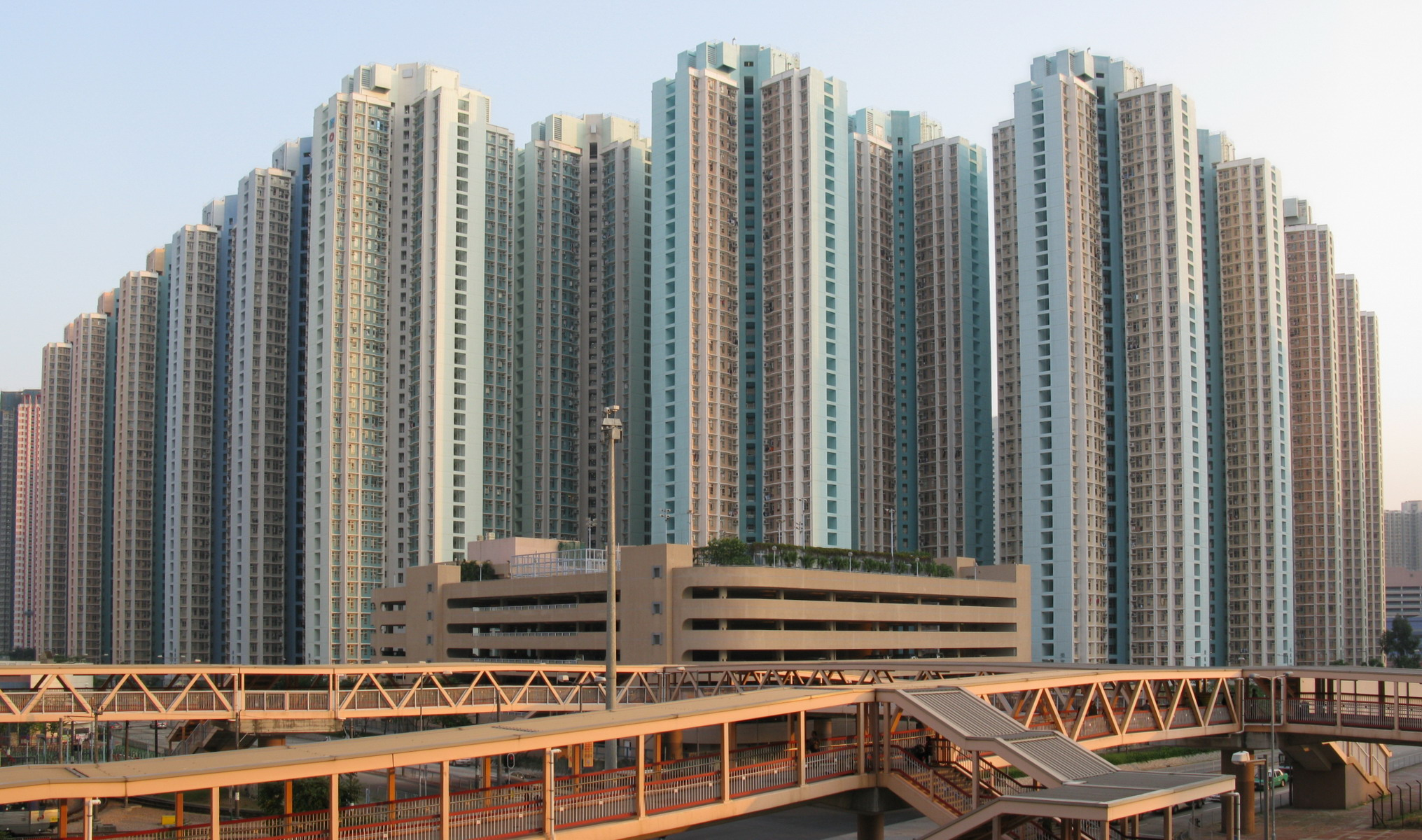
Tin Fu Court, a public housing estate of the Home Ownership Scheme in Tin Shui Wai, Hong Kong

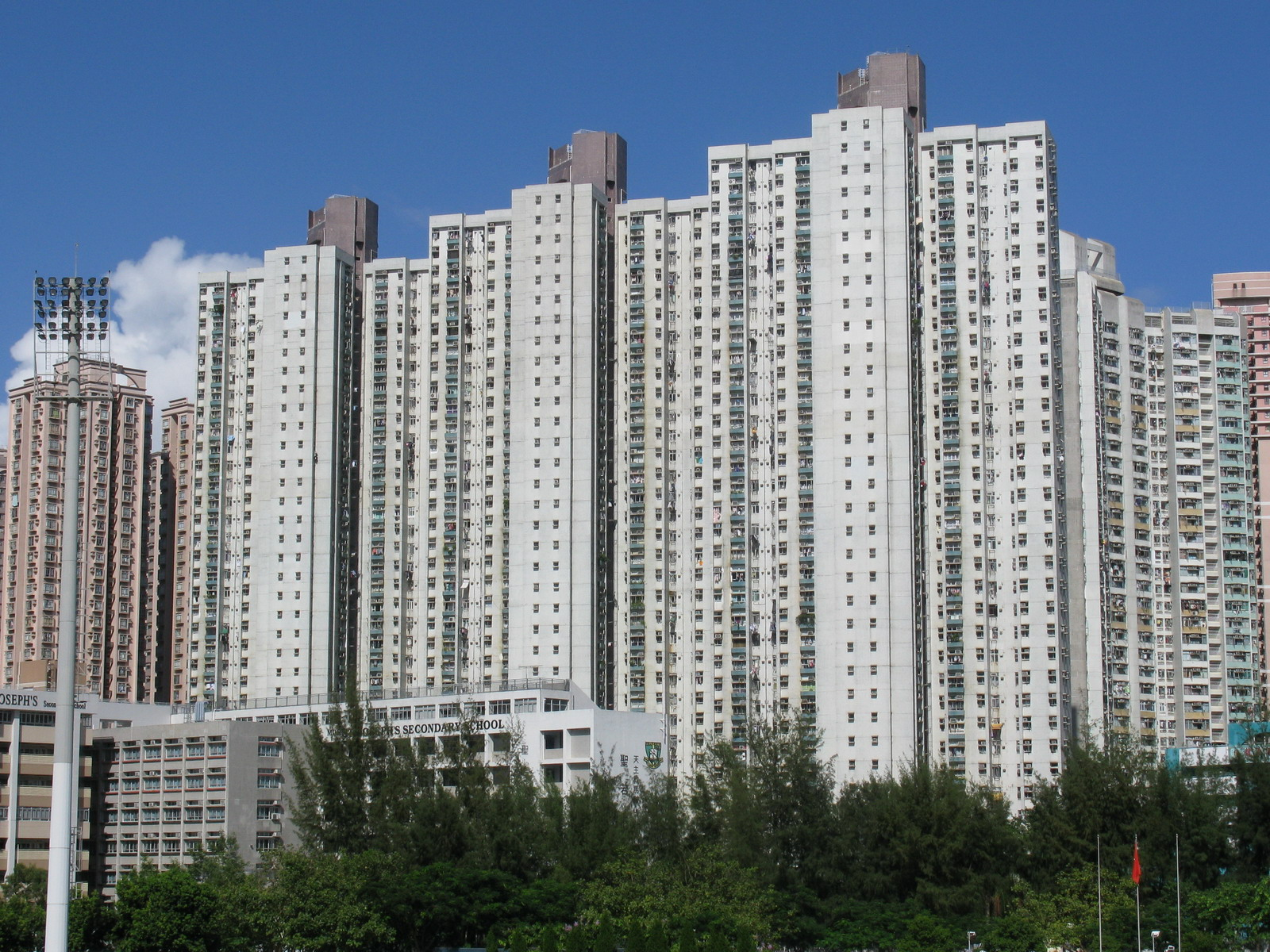
Kam Hay Court in Ma On Shan

The Home Ownership Scheme (HOS) is a subsidised-sale public housing programme managed by the Hong Kong Housing Authority. It was instituted in the late 1970s as part of the government policy for public housing with two aims – to encourage better-off tenants of rental flats to vacate those flats for re-allocation to families in greater housing need, and to provide an opportunity for home ownership for families unable to afford to buy in the private sector.

Under the scheme, the government sells flats to eligible public housing tenants and to lower-income residents at prices below the market level, with discounts usually between 30 and 40 per cent. It restricts resale of the units in the second-hand market to other families who qualify or, on the open market, after payment of a premium equal to the updated value of the discount given on the original purchase. As an ancillary scheme, the Housing Authority also entered into arrangements with local private developers to provide property for sale under the Private Sector Participation Scheme (PSPS).

Between 1995 and 2000, the Hong Kong Housing Society also offered the Sandwich Class Housing Scheme for lower middle class families whose incomes exceeded the Home Ownership Scheme requirements, but still had trouble affording private housing. In 2002, falling real estate values led the government to pause the construction of new Home Ownership Scheme estates.

The Hong Kong government announced the resumption of the HOS programme in 2011 in response to public discontent over the territory's high housing prices. A new series of HOS estates were inaugurated in 2017, and more are under construction.

== History ==
In 1953, a fire broke out in the Shek Kip Mei squatter area. Over 53,000 people were homeless after the fire. The government started to build resettlement blocks to house the victims. The government announced a Ten- year Housing Program and established the Hong Kong Housing Authority to manage the public housing. From 1978 to 2003, the government ran the Home Ownership Scheme for PRH residents and low&middle income families. The first such plan was launched in 1978 and the first batch of flats became available in 1980, the first estates being Yuet Lai Court in Kwai Chung, Shun Chi Court in Kwun Tong, Shan Tsui Court in Chai Wan, Chun Man Court in Ho Man Tin, Sui Wo Court in Sha Tin and Yue Fai Court in Aberdeen.

In 1987, forecasting that the demand for home-ownership was on the rise, the Government launched a plan to redevelop the older housing estates, and introduced a greater choice of apartments available for purchase by public housing tenants. A Home Purchase Loan Scheme was introduced with, initially, a quota of 2,000 loans of HK$50,000 interest-free to make the downpayment on their new private-sector homes.

In December 1991, there was a huge rush to buy 6,452 Housing Authority properties in 17 projects. Flats were to be sold at a discount of 40 per cent, the most attractive for several years.

On 3 September 2001, Dr. Michael Suen Ming Yeung, the Chief Secretary, announced that the Home Ownership Scheme would be stopped. The Housing Authority stopped sale of HOS and PSPS flats for ten months until end of June 2002. Donald Tsang, the Chief Secretary for Administration announced that the sales of HOS flats would not exceed 9,000 a year up to 2005–06, subject to the continuing need to avoid competition with the private sector residential market. Thereafter, they expected more radical cuts in the HOS programme. The Housing Authority started to offer surplus HOS flats for sale in batches until 2011. In 2011, the government announced the Home Ownership Scheme again because of the aspiration for home ownership. Over 460,000 subsidised housing flats have been sold until now.

== Short piling ==
In 2000, the scheme was caught up in a short-piling scandal which resulted in the resignation of Housing Authority chief Rosanna Wong, and a censure for housing director Tony Miller. The construction of 2 blocks of Yu Chui Court in Sha Tin was delayed as it had to be demolished and rebuilt at an estimated cost of HK$250 million. The Wai Kee Group was implicated, and some of its companies were delisted from Government projects following the publication of the Strickland Report.

== Resale ==
Public housing units in Home Ownership Scheme housing estates are subject to sale restrictions under the Housing Ordinance. The Home Ownership Scheme Secondary Market is only open to eligible low-income residents and low-income tenants of rental public housing. Three years after being assigned HOS public housing units, owners are allowed to obtain a certificate from the Housing Authority to place their homes in the HOS Secondary Market, without paying the subsidised land premiums (normally 35–50 per cent discount to the prevailing market). Owners who have sold their HOS public housing units will no longer be eligible for any form of public housing. In general, they are allowed after five years to apply to place their homes in the HOS Secondary Market without paying subsidised land premium, or to apply for removal of sale restrictions by first paying the full subsidies and the land premiums to the Housing Authority, as decided by the Director of Housing.

In 2002, developers complained of weakness in property prices, claiming the housing marketplace was largely distorted by excessive unfair competition from schemes such as the HOS. It was pointed out that a public rental tenant moving into a second-hand HOS flat would receive three lots of subsidies. Government halted the PSPS, developments which were in progress at the time were either transformed into public housing, or sold off to private developers. Construction of new HOS estates was suspended in November 2002, and it was also announced that the TPS would end.

== Hung Hom Peninsula controversy ==
One PSPS project, the 2,470 flat Hung Hom Peninsula built by New World Development and Sun Hung Kai Properties, was sold for a below-market land premium of HK$864 million to New World Development, who subsequently sold off half share to Sun Hung Kai Properties. In 2004, the consortium announced the demolition of these buildings to make way for luxury apartments, which was met by public outcry over the needless destruction of "perfectly good buildings" to satisfy "corporate greed". In an unprecedented about-turn, the developers withdrew the plan on 10 December 2004. The buildings were substantially renovated instead.

== See also ==
- List of Home Ownership Scheme courts in Hong Kong
