= Types of public housing estate blocks in Hong Kong =

Type of public housing estate in Hong Kong

Public housing estates in Hong Kong are the most common kind of public housing in Hong Kong. Typically, estate units are leased to low-income people. There are three organizations that provide housing units. They are Hong Kong Housing Authority (HKHA), Hong Kong Housing Society (HKHS), and Hong Kong Settlers Housing Corporation Limited.

As of 31 March 2016, approx. ⅓ of Hong Kong's population (2.14 million) live in Hong Kong's public housing estates. 760,000 of those units were owned by HKHA while 140,000 are HKHS and 1,400 HK Settlers Housing Corp. Ltd. (Tai Hang Sai Estate)

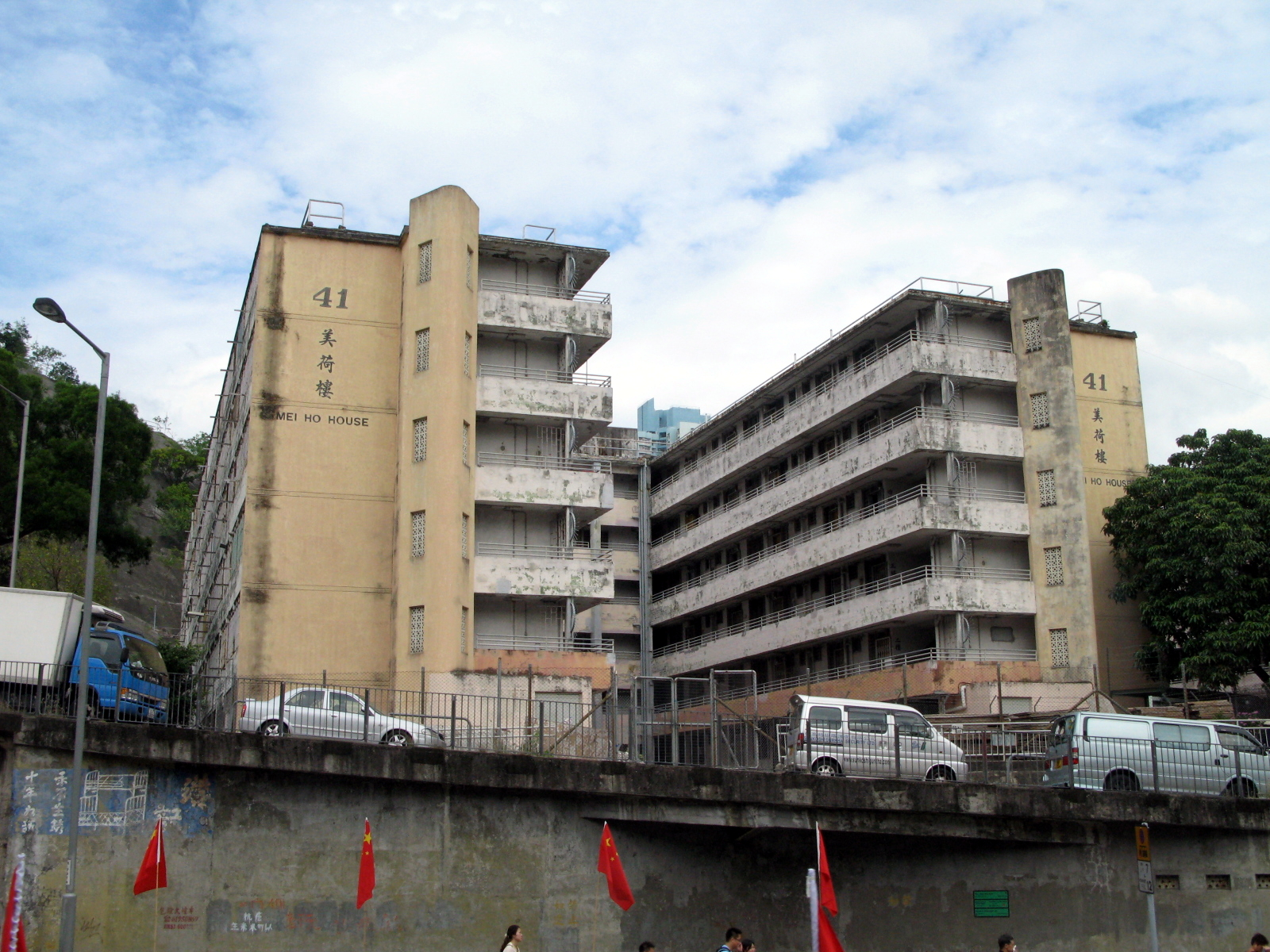
Mei Ho House, Shek Kip Mei Estate was built in 1950s, it is one of the Mark Blocks that was built in resettlement areas, it was chosen to be preserved and was reopened as a youth hostel and heritage museum

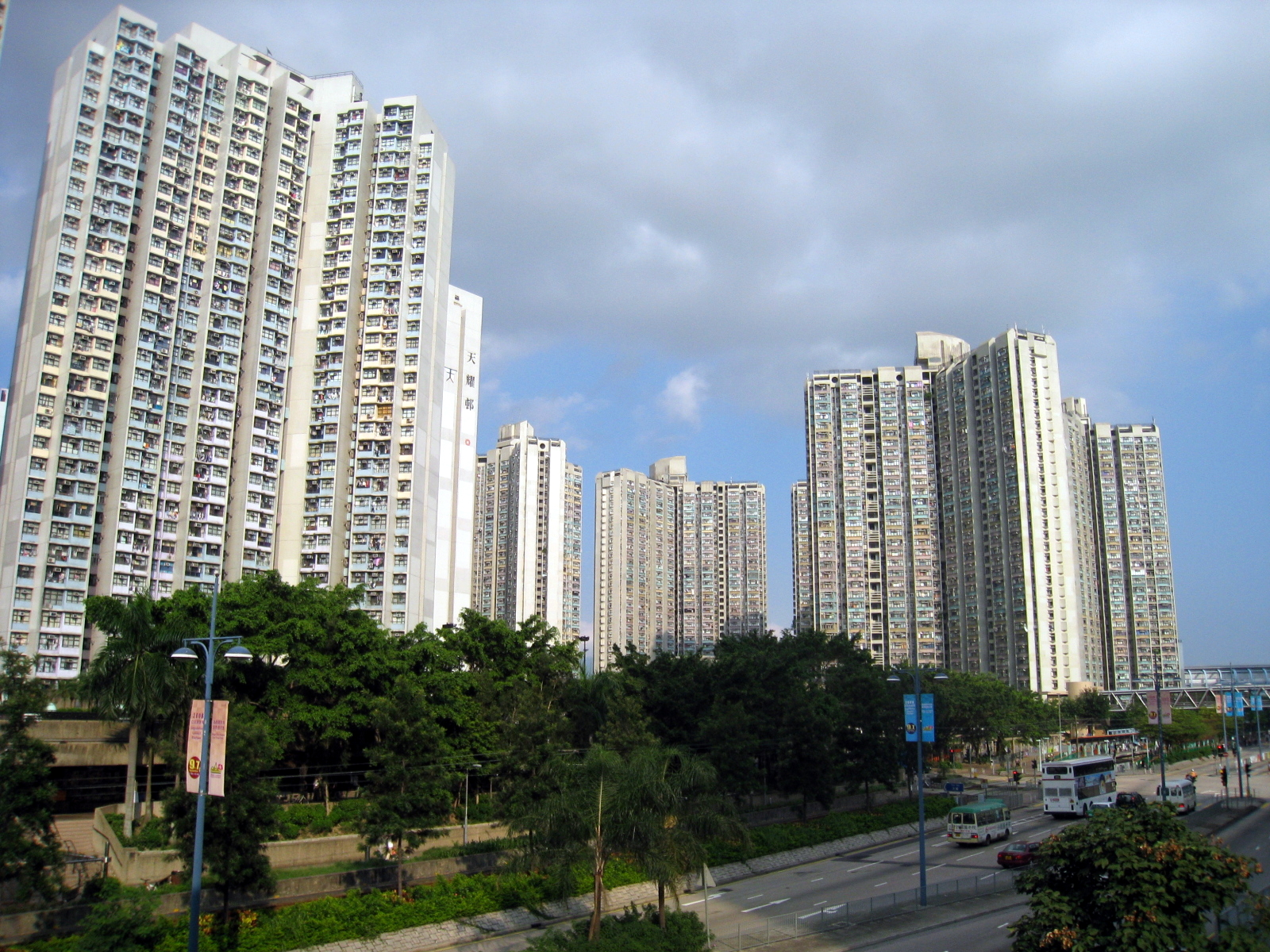
Tin Yiu Estate, Tin Shui Wai was built in 1990s, it is one of the public housing estate that was developed by Hong Kong Housing Authority. Several residential buildings, units and other facilities was improved over the decades

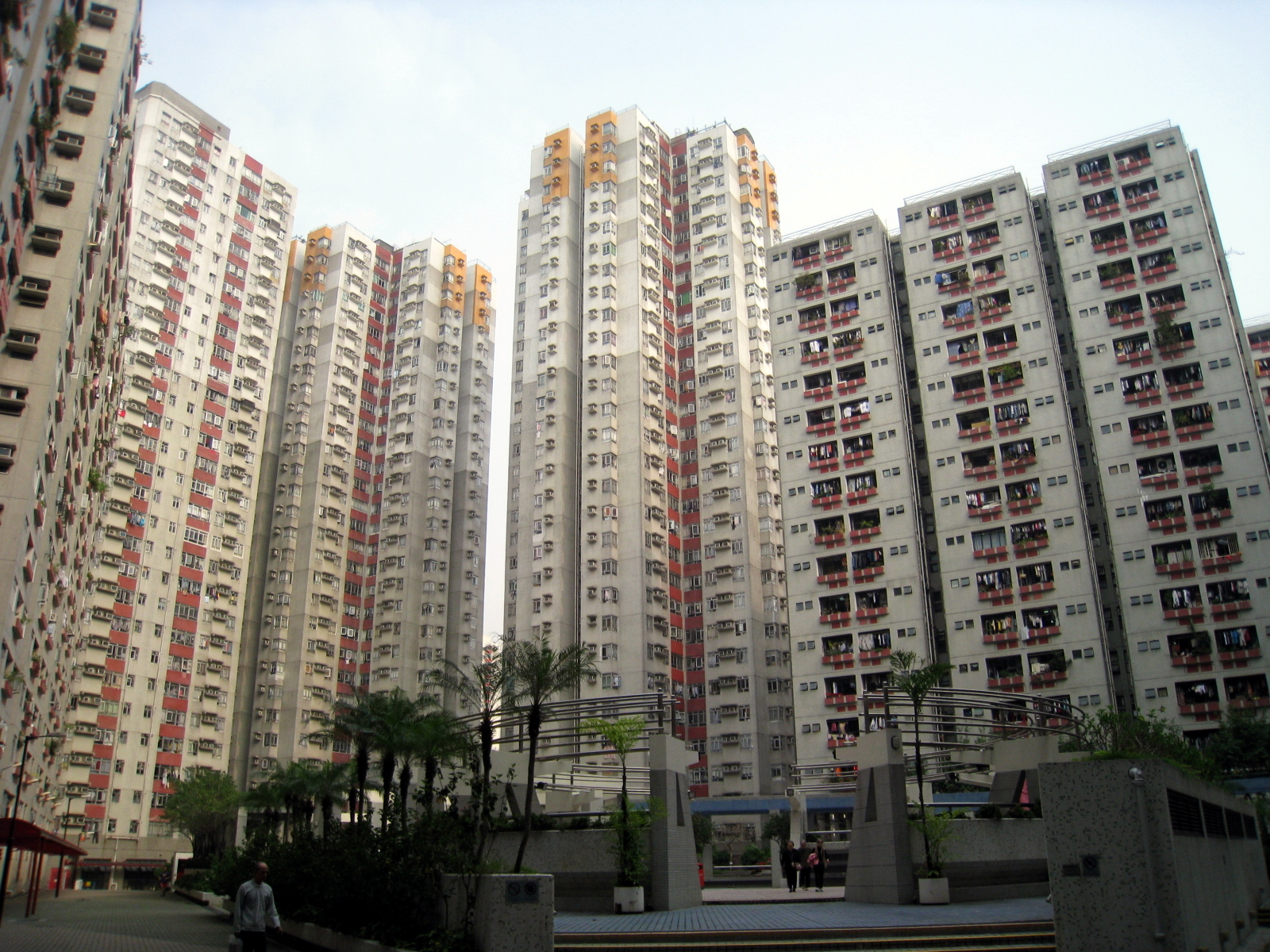
Ka Wai Chuen, Hung Hom was built in 1980s, it is one of the public housing estate that was developed by Hong Kong Housing Society. Besides, it is also included mixed public and a Flat-for-Sale Scheme estate

== History ==
The development of public housing estates in Hong Kong first began in December 1953. To rehouse the fire victims affected by Shek Kip Mei fire, the Resettlement Department built two-story bungalows.

Before HKHA, most public housing units at the time were provided by the HKHS (founded in 1948) and HKS Housing Corp Ltd. (founded in 1950). In 1954, more and more resettlement estates are being built. In the 60s, the committee launched public housing estates. At this point, in the 1980s, the HKHA began to introduce shopping malls, wet markets, parking lots, amenities, green space, and leisure facilities. Such examples include Choi Wan Estate, Mei Lam Estate, Butterfly Estate, Sun Chui Estate, and Lok Wah Estate. Since the 1990s, demand for public housing units began to increase. Density increased and the area for green space and facilities decreased. This phenomenon can be found in public housing estates north of Tin Shui Wai, like Tin Yuet Estate, Tin Wah Estate, and Tin Yat Estate. In the 2000s, green space and facilities began to increase. Due to the appearance of Non-Standard Block|non-standard housing blocks, the HKHA has introduces facilities for children, gardens, and plazas. The new features are an improvement compared to its early versions.

== Types/Designs ==
The designs of public housing blocks are followed as: First Generation (before 1986):

- Single Tower (Ping Shek Estate)
- Twin Tower
- Slab
- Cruciform (Tai Hing Estate and Shun On Estate)
- I/H-shaped block
- Ziggurat (Butterfly Estate)

Second Generation (1986-1992):

- New Slabs
- Trident
- Linear

Third Generation (1992-2003):

- Harmony Block
- Concord Block
- Harmony Wing
- New Cruciform Block
- Interim Housing

Fourth Generation (2003-2012):

- New Harmony
- New Flexi (Shek Pai Wan Estate)

Fifth Generation (2012–present):

- Non-Standard

Here are a list of designs found in the blocks of Hong Kong public housing estates (Note: not all of them will be listed, due to too many designs/types):

| Name | Chinese | Estate | Notes | Photo |
|---|---|---|---|---|
| Old Slab | 舊長型大廈 | Nam Shan Estate, Shek Kip Mei Estate, Lok Fu Estate, Lai King Estate, Sai Wan Estate, Kwai Shing Estate, Model Housing Estate | A design that involved connecting one or more blocks together. Some are rectangular, corner, and diagonal. Typically 10-20 stories. Has a varied number of units per floor depending on length and design. | Lai King Estate |
| Cruciform | 30層大十字型大廈 | Tai Hing Estate and Shun On Estate | Typically 30 stories. Has 48 units per floor. | Tai Hing Estate |
| Twin Tower | 雙塔式 | Wah Fu Estate, Oi Man Estate, Choi Wan Estate, Chuk Yuen Estate, Sau Mau Ping Estate, Shun Lee Estate, Shun Tin Estate, Cheung Ching Estate, Lai Yiu Estate, Cheung Shan Estate, Wu King Estate, Yau Oi Estate, Kwong Fuk Estate, Lung Hang Estate, Sun Chui Estate and Wo Che Estate | Mainly consisting of two square towers. One is high while the other is lower. Typically 24-28 stories. Has 34 units per floor. | Shun Lee Estate |
| H Block | 工字型大廈 | Choi Wan Estate, Tai Yuen Estate, Wo Che Estate, Shui Pin Wai Estate, Tung Tau Estate and Lower Wong Tai Sin Estate | Typically 26-28 stories high. The block is H-shaped. Has 15 units per block (30 - Double H & 45 - Triple H). | Lower Wong Tai Sin Estate |
| I Block | I型大廈 | Chak On Estate, Lai Kok Estate, Shun Tin Estate, Kai Yip Estate, Shek Wai Kok Estate, Sun Tin Wai Estate and Mei Lam Estate | The building is I-shaped and has 3 wings. Usually 21 or 14 stories. Has 27 units per floor. | Mei Lam Estate |
| New Slab | 新長型大廈 | Tak Tin Estate, Heng On Estate, Yiu On Estate, Tsui Lam Estate and Kwai Fong Estate | A successor to Old Slab. Usually 19-22 stories. Number of units per floor may vary by length of block. Only one size is provided and some have subdivided units. | Kwai Fong Estate |
| Linear | 相連長型大廈 | Tai Hang Tung Estate, Nam Cheong Estate, Lei Cheng Uk Estate, Wang Tau Hom Estate, Lok Fu Estate, Tung Tau Estate, Lower Wong Tai Sin Estate, Tsui Ping Estate, Shek Lei Estate, Tai Ping Estate, Kwai Shing Estate, Tai Wo Hau Estate, Kwai Hing Estate, Cheung On Estate and Siu Sai Wan Estate | The block is long and narrow. Usually, the height may vary by area. Usually has 14 units per floor. (20 for Linear 3) | Wang Tau Hom Estate |
| Ziggurat | 梯級型大廈 | Butterfly Estate | Has two Trident blocks connected. Looks like a stepped building, hence it is a ziggurat. | Butterfly Estate |
| Trident 1 | Y1型 | Lei Tung Estate, Lok Wah Estate, Mei Lam Estate, Fu Shin Estate, Cheung Hong Estate and Shan King Estate | Usually 35 stories high and has 36 units per floor. | Lei Tung Estate |
| Trident 2 | Y2型 | Lei Tung Estate, Tsui Ping Estate, Pok Hong Estate, Hin Keng Estate, Fu Shin Estate, Kwong Fuk Estate, Cheung Wah Estate, Tin Ping Estate, Po Lam Estate, Tsui Lam Estate, Cheung Hong Estate, Tsing Yi Estate, Shan King Estate and Long Ping Estate | Usually 35 stories high and has 24 units per floor. | Hin Keng Estate |
| Trident 3 | Y3型 | Chuk Yuen North Estate, Fung Tak Estate, Hing Tin Estate, Choi Ha Estate, Tak Tin Estate, Heng On Estate, Yiu On Estate, Hin Keng Estate, Kwong Yuen Estate, Tai Wo Estate, Fu Heng Estate, Wan Tau Tong Estate, Tin Ping Estate, Wah Ming Estate, King Lam Estate, Tsing Yi Estate, Cheung Hang Estate, Cheung On Estate, Cheung Fat Estate, Tin King Estate, Leung King Estate and Tin Yiu Estate | Usually 35 stories high and has 24-31 units per floor. | Heng On Estate |
| Trident 4 | Y4型 | Tsui Wan Estate, Siu Sai Wan Estate, Fung Wah Estate, Wah Kwai Estate, Lei Cheng Uk Estate, Fung Tak Estate, Tung Tau Estate, Lower Wong Tai Sin Estate, Tsui Ping Estate, Choi Ha Estate, Tak Tin Estate, Yiu On Estate, Hin Keng Estate, Kwong Yuen Estate, Fu Heng Estate, Tin Ping Estate, Wah Ming Estate, King Lam Estate, Tsing Yi Estate, Cheung Hang Estate, Tin King Estate, Kin Sang Estate, Leung King Estate and Tin Yiu Estate | Usually 35 stories and has 18-25 units per floor. | Fung Wah Estate |
| Harmony 1 | 和諧一型 | Hau Tak Estate, Lei Muk Shue Estate, Tin Yuet Estate and Sau Mau Ping Estate | Usually 38-41 stories. Has 16-20 units per floor. (24 in Yau Tong Estate) | Tin Yuet Estate |
| Harmony 1A | 和諧1A型 | Lai On Estate, Pak Tin Estate and Lok Fu Estate | Harmony 1A was used due to height restrictions surrounding Kai Tak Airport. Same as Harmony 1, but shorter. | Lai On Estate |
| Harmony 2 | 和諧二型 | Cheung Hang Estate, Sau Mau Ping Estate and Tin Yiu Estate | Usually Y-shaped. Has 18-21 units per floor. | Cheung Hang Estate |
| Harmony 3 | 和諧三型 | Kwong Tin Estate, Hung Hom Estate, Lower Wong Tai Sin Estate and Sau Mau Ping Estate | Usually T-shaped. Has 16-18 units per floor. Height may vary by area. | Hung Hom Estate |
| Small Household | 小型單位大廈 | Chung On Estate、Oi Tung Estate、and Fortune Estate | There is a standard unit design but has no standard in the building design. | Fortune Estate |
| Single Aspect Building | 單方向設計大廈 | Fu Tai Estate、Upper Wong Tai Sin Estate、Sau Mau Ping Estate、and Kwai Fong Estate | The design is used only when the block is facing on the noisy area. The units are located on the opposite side of the noisy side. | Upper Wong Tai Sin Estate |
| Harmony Rural | 和諧式鄉村型 | Ma Hang Estate、Kam Peng Estate、and Nga Ning Court | The appearance may look different by place. Usually 4-10 stories high. | Kam Peng Estate |
| Concord 1 | 康和一型 | Tin Heng Estate、Fu Tai Estate、and Yat Tung Estate | Typically cross-shaped with 2 units per wing, totaling 8 units per floor. Usually 41 stories in height. | Tin Heng Estate |
| New Cruciform | 新十字型 | Tin Yat Estate、Hoi Lai Estate、and Wo Che Estate | Usually 35-41 stories tall. One pair of wings is longer than the other pair. One pair provides 3 units while the other provides 2. There are 10 units per floor. | Wo Che Estate |
| New Flexi | 靈活性大廈 | Shek Pai Wan Estate | Usually 40 stories high and has 10 units per floor. | Shek Pai Wan Estate |
| Rural | 鄉村式 | Lung Tin Estate、Ngan Wan Estate | The building height may vary by place. Usually 3-11 stories high. | Lung Tin Estate |
| Interim Housing | 多層中轉房屋 | Po Tin Estate、Tin Yan Estate | Cross-shaped and has 9 units per wing. Usually 28 stories. | Po Tin Estate |
| Non-Standard Block | 非標準設計大廈 | Lower Ngau Tau Kok Estate、Shek Kip Mei Estate、and Choi Fook Estate | This is the design currently used as of today. The design is flexible and can vary place-to-place. | Shek Kip Mei Estate |

== Floor plans ==
Here is a list of floorplans for public housing blocks in Hong Kong:

| Type | Link |
|---|---|
| Concord 1 | https://www.housingauthority.gov.hk/common/pdf/global-elements/estate-locator/standard-block-typical-floor-plans/01-Concord1.pdf |
| Concord 2 | https://web.archive.org/web/20160305235039/https://hk.imgup.auctions.yahoo.com/ac/tmp/04/06/tmp859bf5b3-ac-1873xf2x0600x0456-m.jpg |
| Concord 3 | https://web.archive.org/web/20160305173246/https://hk.imgup.auctions.yahoo.com/ac/tmp/d4/ee/tmp859bf5b3-ac-8628xf9x0600x0413-m.jpg |
| Harmony 1 | https://www.housingauthority.gov.hk/common/pdf/global-elements/estate-locator/standard-block-typical-floor-plans/02-Harmony1.pdf |
| Harmony 1A | http://century21.hk/hos/data/tbl_hos_photo/org/930_1/yeechingcourt_bA-01.jpg |
| Harmony 2 | https://www.housingauthority.gov.hk/common/pdf/global-elements/estate-locator/standard-block-typical-floor-plans/03-Harmony2.pdf |
| Harmony 3 | https://www.housingauthority.gov.hk/common/pdf/global-elements/estate-locator/standard-block-typical-floor-plans/04-Harmony3.pdf |
| Harmony Rural | https://www.housingauthority.gov.hk/common/pdf/global-elements/estate-locator/standard-block-typical-floor-plans/05-HarmonyRural.pdf |
| Linear Block | https://www.housingauthority.gov.hk/common/pdf/global-elements/estate-locator/standard-block-typical-floor-plans/06-Linear.pdf |
| New Cruciform | https://www.housingauthority.gov.hk/common/pdf/global-elements/estate-locator/standard-block-typical-floor-plans/07-NewCruciform.pdf |
| New Harmony | https://www.housingauthority.gov.hk/common/pdf/global-elements/estate-locator/standard-block-typical-floor-plans/08-NewHarmony1.pdf |
| New Slab | https://www.housingauthority.gov.hk/common/pdf/global-elements/estate-locator/standard-block-typical-floor-plans/09-NewSlab.pdf |
| H Block | https://www.housingauthority.gov.hk/common/pdf/global-elements/estate-locator/standard-block-typical-floor-plans/10-HBlock.pdf |
| I Block | https://www.housingauthority.gov.hk/common/pdf/global-elements/estate-locator/standard-block-typical-floor-plans/11-SingleI.pdf |
| Old Slab | https://www.housingauthority.gov.hk/common/pdf/global-elements/estate-locator/standard-block-typical-floor-plans/12-Slab.pdf |
| Small Household | https://www.housingauthority.gov.hk/common/pdf/global-elements/estate-locator/standard-block-typical-floor-plans/13-SmallHousehold.pdf |
| Trident Block | https://www.housingauthority.gov.hk/common/pdf/global-elements/estate-locator/standard-block-typical-floor-plans/14-Trident.pdf |
| Twin Tower | https://www.housingauthority.gov.hk/common/pdf/global-elements/estate-locator/standard-block-typical-floor-plans/15-TwinTower.pdf |

== Photography ==
The social media boom has made people go inside the public housing estates and take photos. It evolved to include the housing estate background into their videos. The estates involved were Nam Shan Estate, Choi Hung Estate, Lok Wah Estate, Ping Shek Estate, etc. Some of them even set up special sections dedicated to these estates.

In 2018, W. Leung, the man who has travelled to 200 public housing estates and took 200,000 photos inside the estates won a National Geographic award due to one of his photos involving a staircase at Jat Min Chuen. It showcased the beauty of Hong Kong's public housing estates.

=== Art ===
Due to the popularity of social media, a lot of foreigners come to Hong Kong's public housing estates. A Japanese artist called Fujiwara launched Engeki Quest at Choi Hung Estate.

== Facilities for deaf residents ==
The housing authority hasn't installed sufficient fire lights for the deaf or residents with hearing loss. These residents have tried to apply but were rejected. The Labor Party and a group of deaf people filed a lawsuit against the housing authority, alleging that they couldn't hear the fire alarms. Chairman Kwok Wing-kin said that people who were deaf or have hearing loss should not be deprived of proper living conditions. Siu Tsan, founder of Silence, has claimed that at least some of the residents having deafness or have hearing loss live in at least 1,000 public housing estates.

== See also ==
- Mark Blocks
- Shek Kip Mei fire
- List of public housing estates in Hong Kong
- Public housing in Hong Kong
- Home Ownership Scheme & Tenants Purchase Scheme
- Public factory estates in Hong Kong
