= Trident Block =

Hong Kong housing design

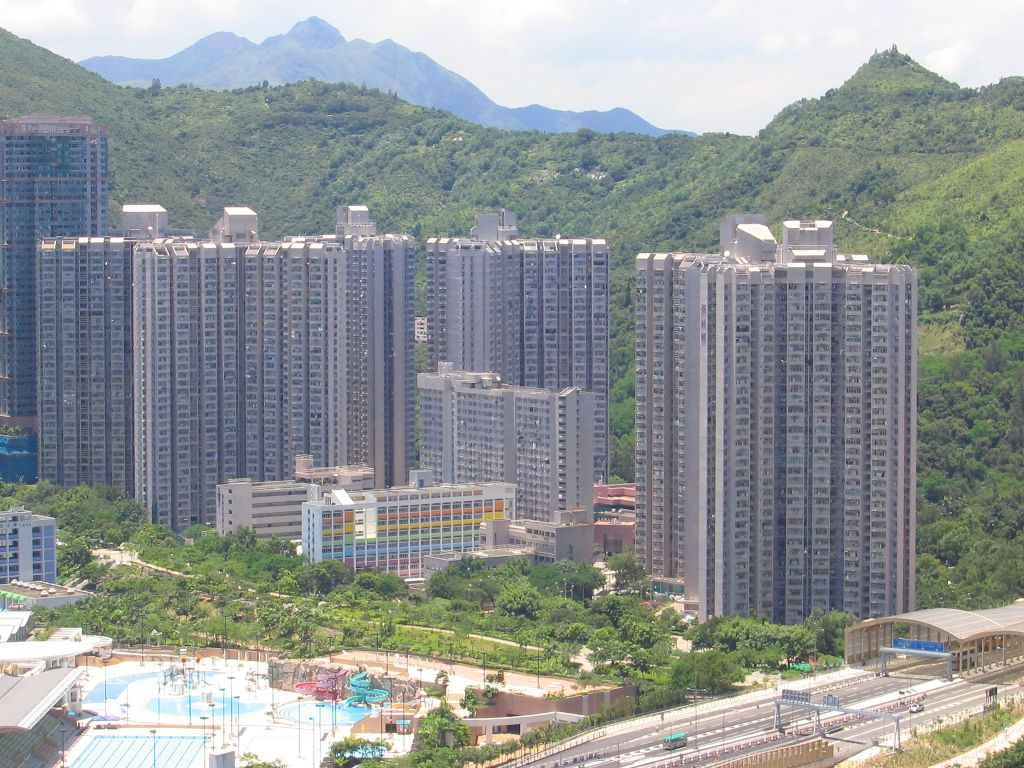
King Lam Estate

Trident Blocks (Chinese: Y型大廈) sometimes referred to as TR are a three-wing design building. Trident blocks are split into four types, which are Trident 1, Trident 2, Trident 3, and Trident 4. They are mostly built between 1984 and 1992. Most Trident blocks are used as public housing or Home Ownership Scheme estates.

== Overview ==
The origins of the name suggest that the building is Y-shaped, with three wings. The look of the building and the units look different than one another. The design has low flexibility and the height can't be changed. It takes a lot of land. Therefore, most are located in the new towns of Hong Kong.

== Types ==
=== Trident 1 ===
Trident 1 blocks are 35 stories tall and have 36 units per floor. Most units could only accommodate 3 or fewer people.

Trident 1 blocks can be found in Cheung Hong Estate, Shan King Estate, Fu Shin Estate, Lok Wah Estate, Mei Lam Estate and Lei Tung Estate. Lei Tung Estate currently holds the record with the most Trident 1 blocks at 4.

Trident 1 blocks have 12 units per wing. It has 36 units per floor. A typical Trident 1 block has 1,224 units, but some can have up to more than 1,300. This is why units are subdivided.

In Cheung Hong Estate, there are two designs of Trident 1 blocks. Fu Shin Estate currently has a Trident 1 block with an odd number of units per floor, which is 30. Trident 1 blocks are rarely sold.

=== Trident 2 ===
A Trident 2 block is 35 stories tall with 816 units and 8 units per wing. There are 24 units per floor. 3/4 of units are classed as Type B, meaning families with 4 or 6 people can live in this type. This is the first time that a concept called 'a house with multiple rooms' is used. 1/4 of the units are Type C units, meaning 7 or more can live there. They are located in the each end of the wing.

Most of them are completed between 1984 and 1989. The first Trident 2 block completed is in Cheung Wah Estate. Other blocks include Pok Hong Estate and Cheung Hong Estate. In fact, in some cases, Trident 2 blocks are also found in Home Ownership Scheme estates, like Ching Shing Court, May Shing Court, and Fung Shing Court. It is only available to Green Form Subsidised Home Ownership Scheme members, an early form of Home Ownership Scheme. The last Trident 2 blocks are in Long Ping Estate. The record holder for the most Trident 2 blocks in an estate is Lei Tung Estate, with 6 blocks.

=== Trident 3 ===
Trident 3 blocks are 35 stories tall and have 24 units per floor, with 8 units per wing. It can have 800 to 1100 units. It is also the first design to feature air conditioning and the first to use prefabrication (Tai Wo Estate). It takes up a lot of land. It is mostly found in the new towns of Hong Kong. Most are completed between 1987 and 1992. Heng On Estate currently haves the first Trident 3 blocks. It can be found in Tin Yiu Estate and Tak Tin Estate. There are some cases where Trident 3 blocks end up in Home Ownership Scheme courts. Ching Nga Court and Ching Tai Court are the only HOS courts to have Trident 3 blocks.

=== Trident 3A ===
There are also Trident 3 blocks that have ‘subdivided units’. For example, two of the wings have 5 subdivided units at the end while one of the wings have 4 subdivided units. Therefore, it brings the total up to 32 units per floor with 14 subdivided units. This variant is called ‘Trident 3A’.

=== Trident 4 ===
Trident 4 blocks are similar to Trident 3 blocks, but take up less space. Usually, these types of blocks are 35 stories in height. Some are even shorter due to height restrictions by Kai Tak Airport, like Tung Tau Estate, Tsui Wan Estate, Siu Sai Wan Estate, and Lei Cheng Uk Estate. It only has only 414 - 850 units in a Trident 4 block, 6 to 9 units per wing, and 18 to 25 units per floor. The first Trident 4 blocks are in Wah Kwai Estate. The last Trident 4 blocks are completed in Tin Yiu Estate. Lei Cheng Uk Estate and Choi Ha Estate also have Trident 4 blocks. Some Home Ownership scheme courts also have Trident 4 blocks. Fung Chuen Court and Chung Nga Court are the only HOS courts to have Trident 4 blocks.

== Gallery ==
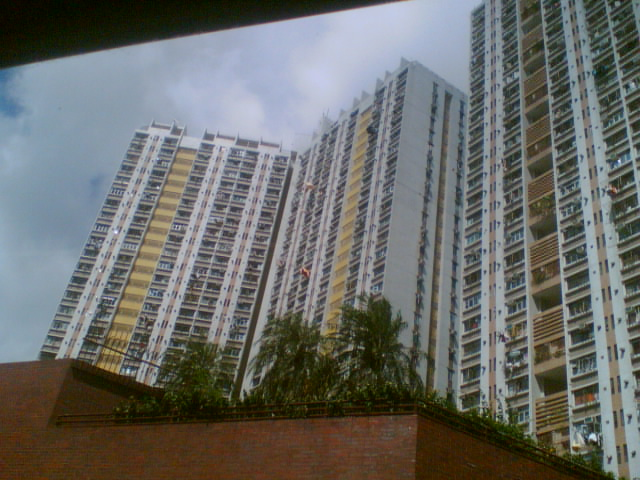
Trident 1 blocks in Lei Tung Estate, Ap Lei Chau. They are built in 1987.

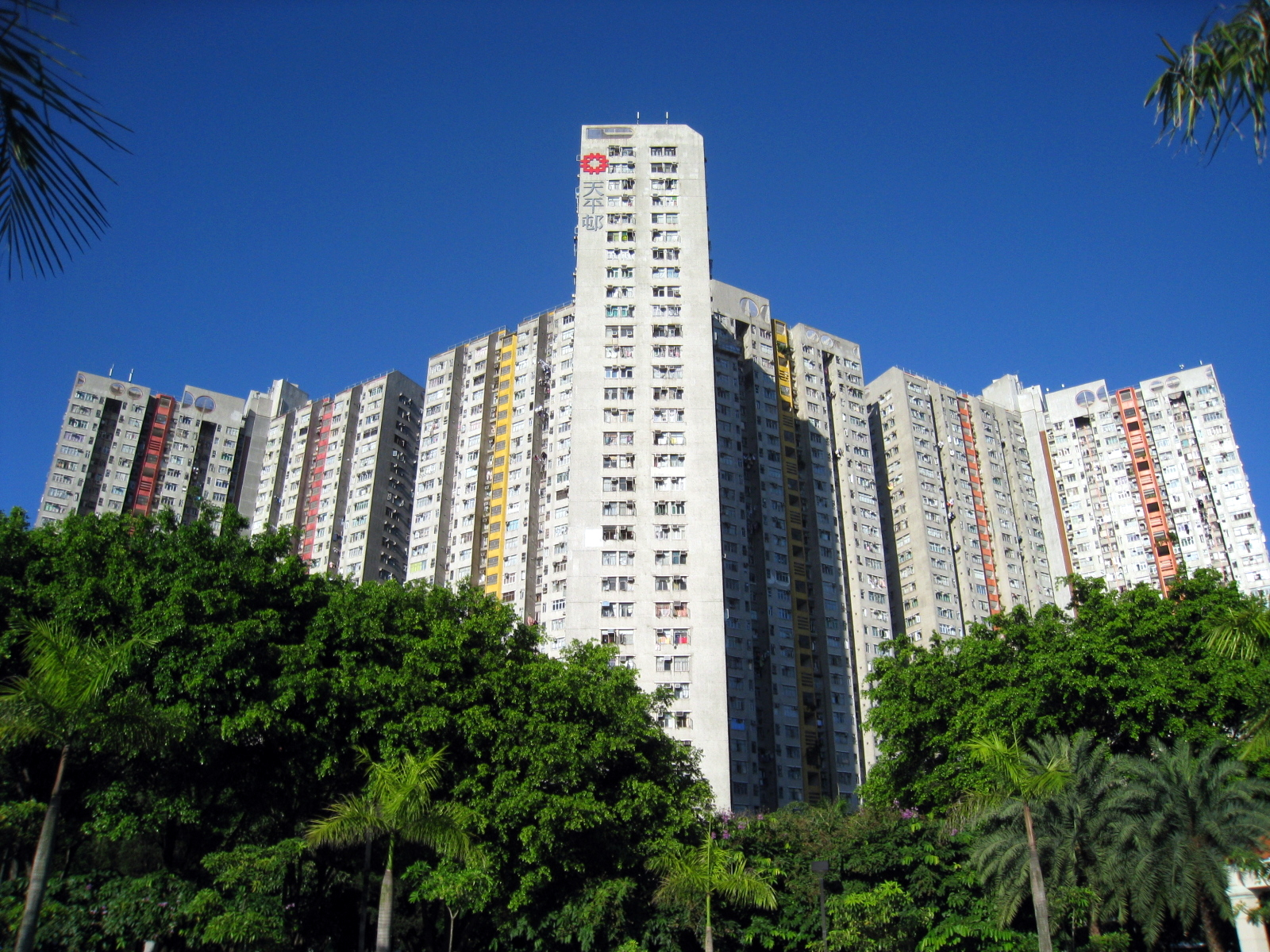
Trident 2 blocks in Tin Ping Estate, Sheung Shui. They are built in 1986.

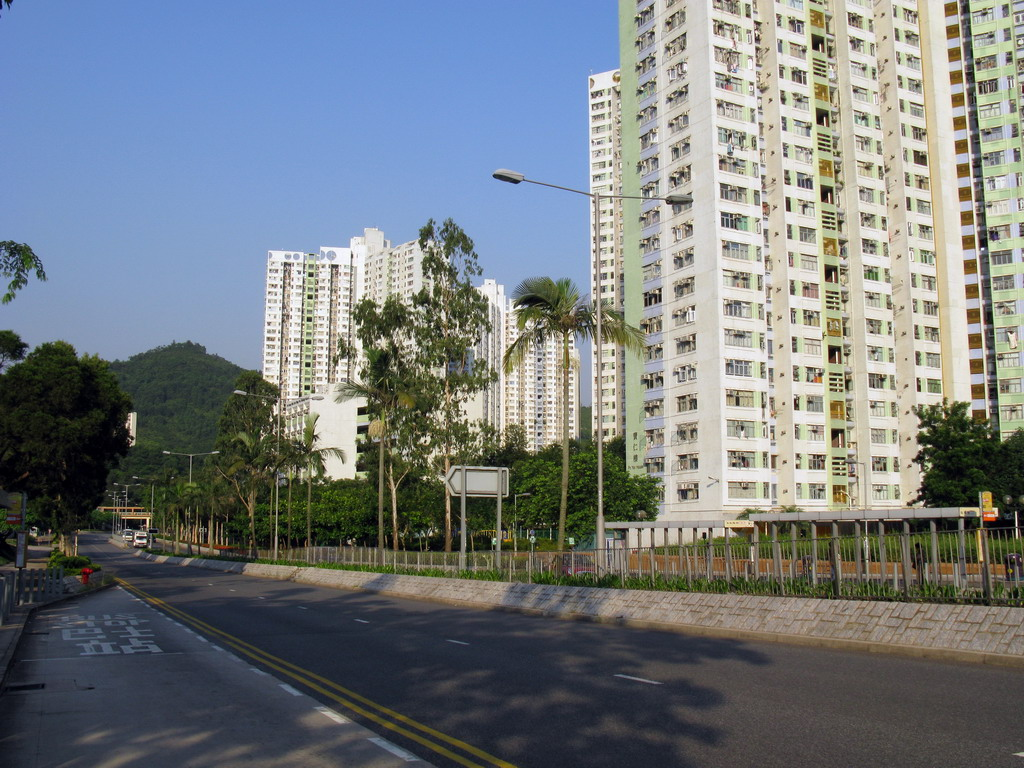
Trident 2 blocks in Po Lam Estate, Tseung Kwan O. They are built in 1988.

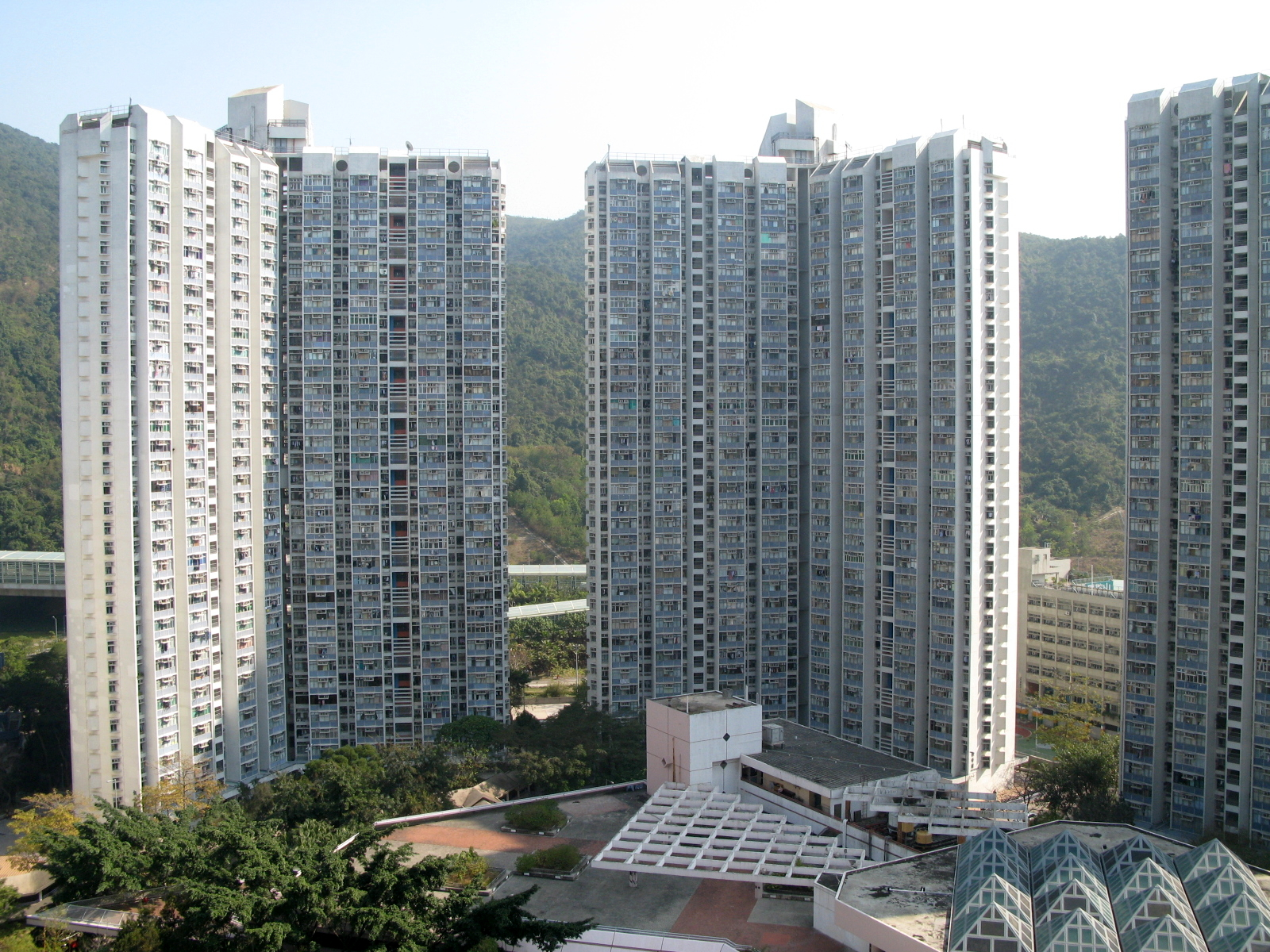
Trident 3 blocks in Heng On Estate, Ma On Shan. They are built in 1987.

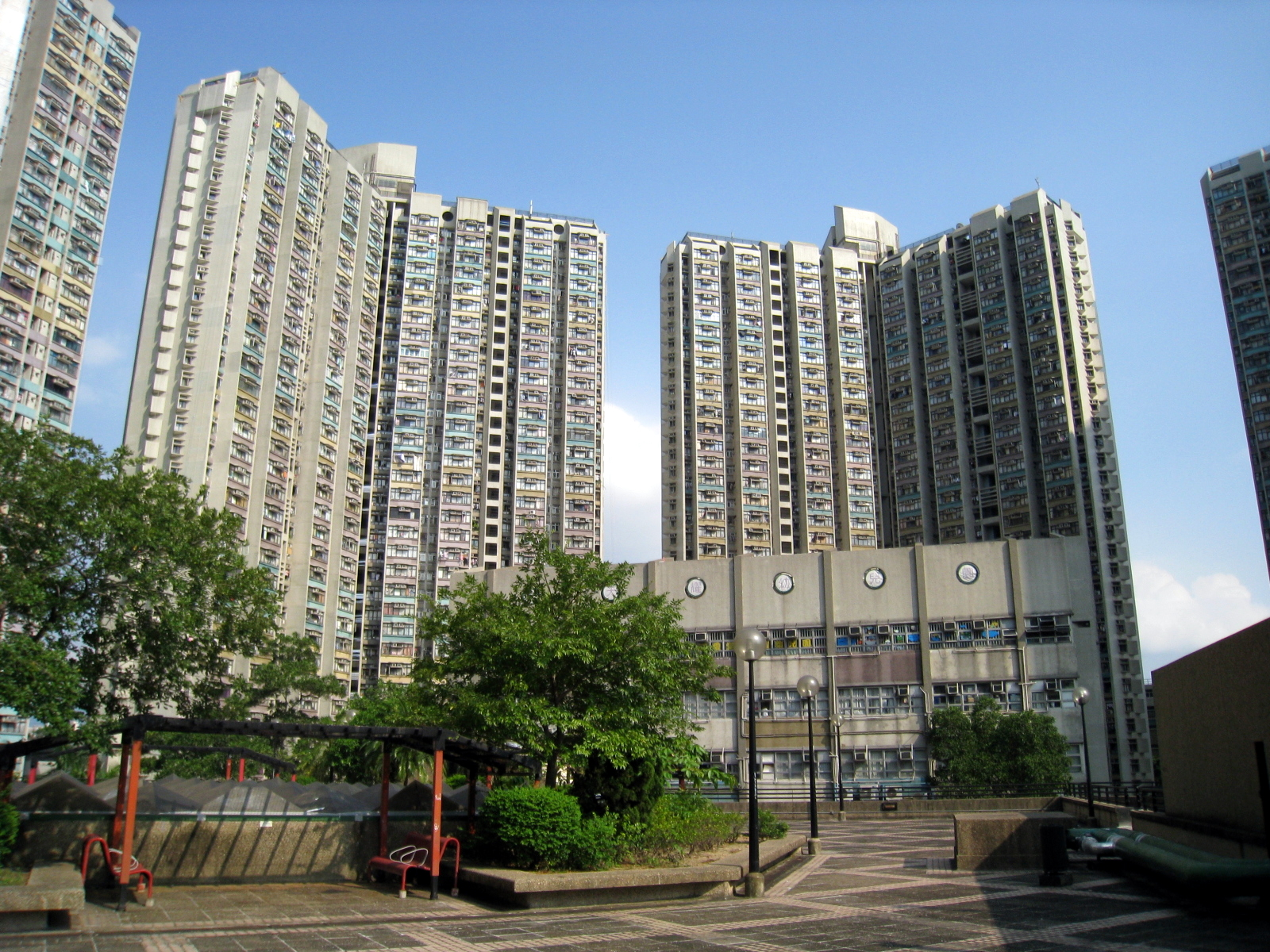
Trident 3 blocks in Tin Yiu Estate, Tin Shui Wai. They are built in 1992.

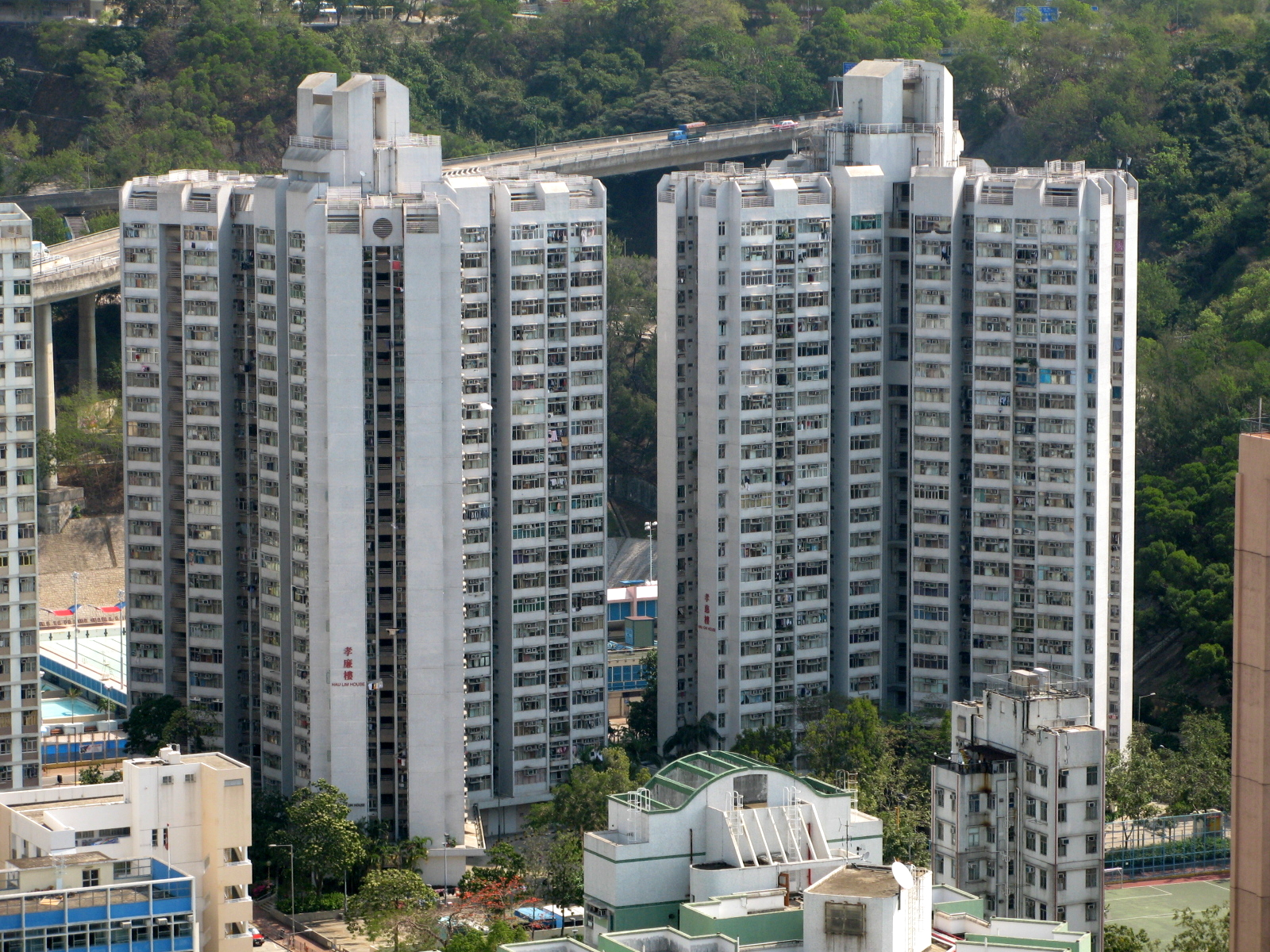
Trident 4 blocks in Lei Cheng Uk Estate, Sham Shui Po. They are built in 1989.

== List of blocks ==
Hong Kong Isl. and Kowloon

Trident Blocks in Hong Kong Isl. and Kowloon
District	Estates/HOS Courts	Quantity by type				Completion
District	Estates/HOS Courts	Y1	Y2	Y3	Y4	Completion
Eastern	Tsui Wan Estate	-	-	-	4	1988 - 1989
Eastern	Siu Sai Wan Estate	-	-	-	4	1990
Eastern	King Tsui Court	-	-	-	1	1991
Eastern	Fung Wah Estate	-	-	-	2	1991
Southern	Lei Tung Estate	2	6	-	-	1987
Southern	Wah Kwai Estate	-	-	-	5	1990 - 1991
Sham Shui Po	Lei Cheng Uk Estate	-	-	-	2	1989
Wong Tai Sin	Chuk Yuen North Estate	-	-	8	-	1987 and 1989
Wong Tai Sin	Fung Tak Estate	-	-	4	1	1991 - 1992
Wong Tai Sin	Tung Tau Estate	-	-	-	2	1991
Wong Tai Sin	Lower Wong Tai Sin Estate	-	-	-	4	1989 - 1990
Wong Tai Sin	Fung Chuen Court	-	-	-	1	1991
Wong Tai Sin	Pang Ching Court	-	-	1	-	1991
Kwun Tong	Lok Wah Estate	4	-	-	-	1985
Kwun Tong	Tsui Ping Estate (North)	-	1	-	-	1986
Kwun Tong	Tsui Ping Estate (South)	-	-	-	2	1989 - 1990
Kwun Tong	Hing Tin Estate	-	-	3	-	1987 - 1988
Kwun Tong	Choi Ha Estate	-	-	1	2	1989 - 1990
Kwun Tong	Tak Tin Estate	-	-	3	2	1991 - 1992
Kwun Tong	Hong Ying Court	-	-	1	-	1991
Total		6	7	21	32	♦

Eastern New Territories

Trident Blocks in Eastern New Territories
District	Estates/HOS Courts	Quantity by Type				Completion
District	Estates/HOS Courts	Y1	Y2	Y3	Y4	Completion
Sha Tin	Mei Lam Estate	1	-	-	-	1985
Sha Tin	Fung Shing Court	-	3	-	-	1985
Sha Tin	May Shing Court	-	2	-	-	1984 - 1985
Sha Tin	Pok Hong Estate	-	3	-	-	1985
Sha Tin	Heng On Estate	-	-	6	-	1987
Sha Tin	Yiu On Estate	-	-	2	4	1988 - 1989
Sha Tin	Hin Keng Estate	-	4	1	3	1986 - 1988
Sha Tin	Kwong Yuen Estate	-	-	2	4	1989 - 1990
Sha Tin	Kwong Lam Court	-	-	-	3	1990
Tai Po	Fu Shin Estate	2	4	-	-	1985
Tai Po	Kwong Fuk Estate	-	2	-	-	1985
Tai Po	Tai Wo Estate	-	-	6	-	1989
Tai Po	Po Nga Court	-	-	3	-	1989
Tai Po	Fu Heng Estate	-	-	3	3	1990 - 1991
Tai Po	Chung Nga Court	-	-	1	-	1992
Tai Po	Wan Tau Tong Estate	-	-	3	-	1991 - 1992
Tai Po	Yat Nga Court	-	-	-	2	1991
Tai Po	Chung Nga Court	-	-	1	2	1991
Northern	Cheung Wah Estate	-	2	-	-	1985
Northern	Tin Ping Estate	-	3	2	1	1986 - 1987 and 1989 - 1990
Northern	Wah Ming Estate	-	-	4	3	1990
Northern	On Shing Court	-	-	-	1	1990
Sai Kung	Po Lam Estate	-	4	-	-	1988
Sai Kung	Tsui Lam Estate	-	4	-	-	1988
Sai Kung	King Lam Estate	-	-	3	2	1990 - 1991
Sai Kung	Ho Ming Court	-	-	1	-	1990
Total		3	31	38	30	♦

Western New Territories

Trident Blocks in Western New Territories
District	Estates/HOS Courts	Quantity by type				Completion
District	Estates/HOS Courts	Y1	Y2	Y3	Y4	Completion
Kwai Tsing	Cheung Hong Estate	2	2	-	-	1985 - 1986
Kwai Tsing	Ching Shing Court	-	1	-	-	1986
Kwai Tsing	Tsing Yi Estate	-	2	1	1	1986 and 1989
Kwai Tsing	Cheung On Estate	-	-	6	-	1988 - 1989
Kwai Tsing	Cheung Fat Estate	-	-	1	-	1989
Kwai Tsing	Ching Nga Court	-	-	1	-	1989
Kwai Tsing	Cheung Hang Estate	-	-	1	3	1990
Yuen Long	Shan King Estate	3	3	-	-	1985
Yuen Long	Tin King Estate	-	-	2	1	1990
Yuen Long	Kin Sang Estate	-	-	-	4	1989
Yuen Long	Leung King Estate	-	-	5	2	1988 - 1990
Yuen Long	Siu Pong Court	-	-	-	1	1991
Yuen Long	Siu Lung Court	-	-	-	1	1991
Yuen Long	Siu Hin Court	-	-	-	2	1991
Yuen Long	Siu Kwai Court	-	-	1	1	1990
Tuen Mun	Long Ping Estate		3	-	-	1987 and 1989
Tuen Mun	Tin Yiu Estate	-	-	3	2	1992
Total		5	11	21	16	♦

== See also ==
- Types of public housing estate blocks in Hong Kong
- Concord Block
- Cruciform block
- Harmony Block
