= New Slab =

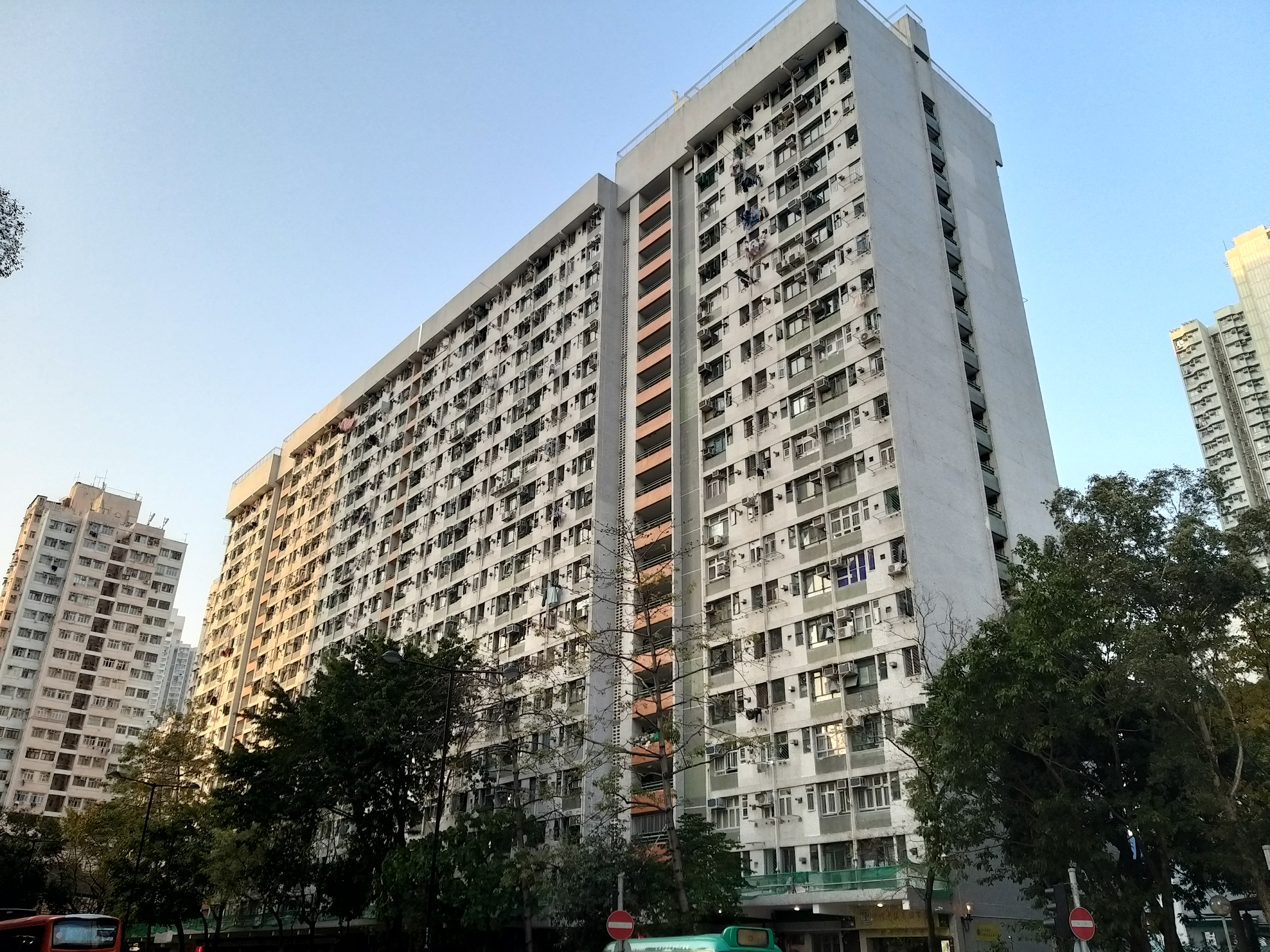
Kwai Yan House, Kwai Fong Estate

New Slab (Chinese: 新長型大廈) is a design of residential block of public housing estate in Hong Kong, and the successor to the Old Slab design. It is a modification of the Old Slab design. They were built between 1986 and 1991. In public housing estates, it is typically built alongside Trident blocks.

== Overview ==
In 1984, the Hong Kong Housing Authority announced that a new design called "New Slab" would replace the Old Slab. In design, the units are more uniform compared to Old Slab blocks. The new blocks only provide units with one particular size. Some even have subdivided units. For example, a subdivided unit goes by numerical order, like 1 and 2. There is no balcony and kitchen. A unit area of this size is around 121 sq ft. The slab block at Kwai Fong Estate uses a special design unique to this place.

Typically, they are built as well with Trident 3 and 4 blocks (some with Trident 2 (click fourth option), Linear, and I Block) to balance the unit size at the estate. This is where a case where multiple types of blocks have to be built to make the ratio equal to one another. It also has its own disadvantages, like a lack of flexibility, shortened height (19, 20, or 22 stories), and location.

The first block to be completed was located at Heng On Estate, which began construction in October 1984 and completed in November 1986. The last block was completed in April 1991, located at Tak Tin Estate.

Except in Kwai Yan House, Kwai Fong Estate, all blocks are under the Tenants Purchase Scheme. This is due that Kwai Fong Estate has harmonious blocks around its area.

=== Design ===
There are two types of new slab blocks, which were single and double wing. The slab block is also available in 0, 90, and 135 degree variants. The slab block can adopt to estate plans. It has 26 units per floor and can be modular. The block looks same to Old Slab.

== Gallery ==
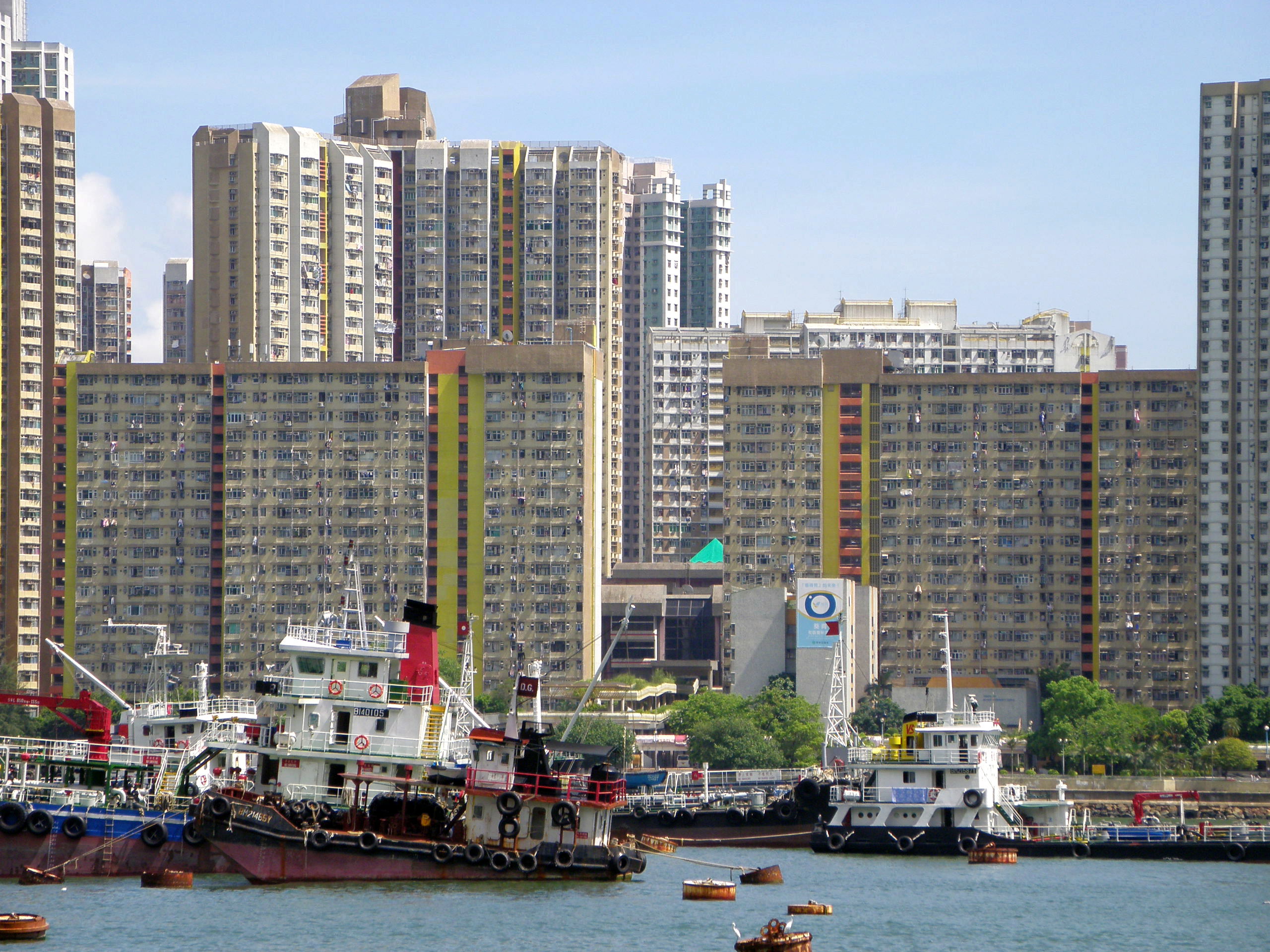
Cheung Fat Estate

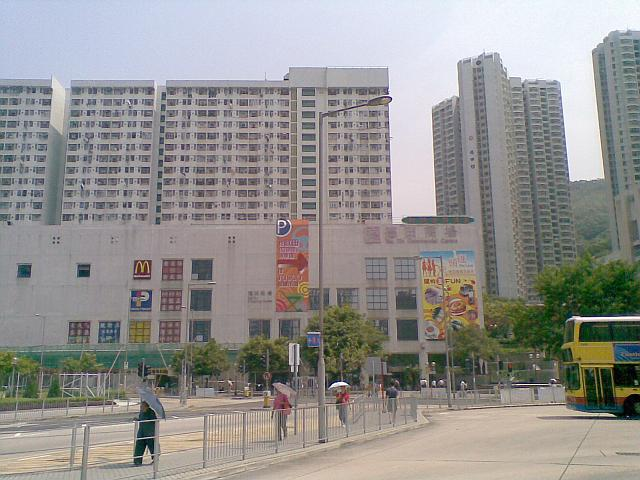
Tak Tin Estate

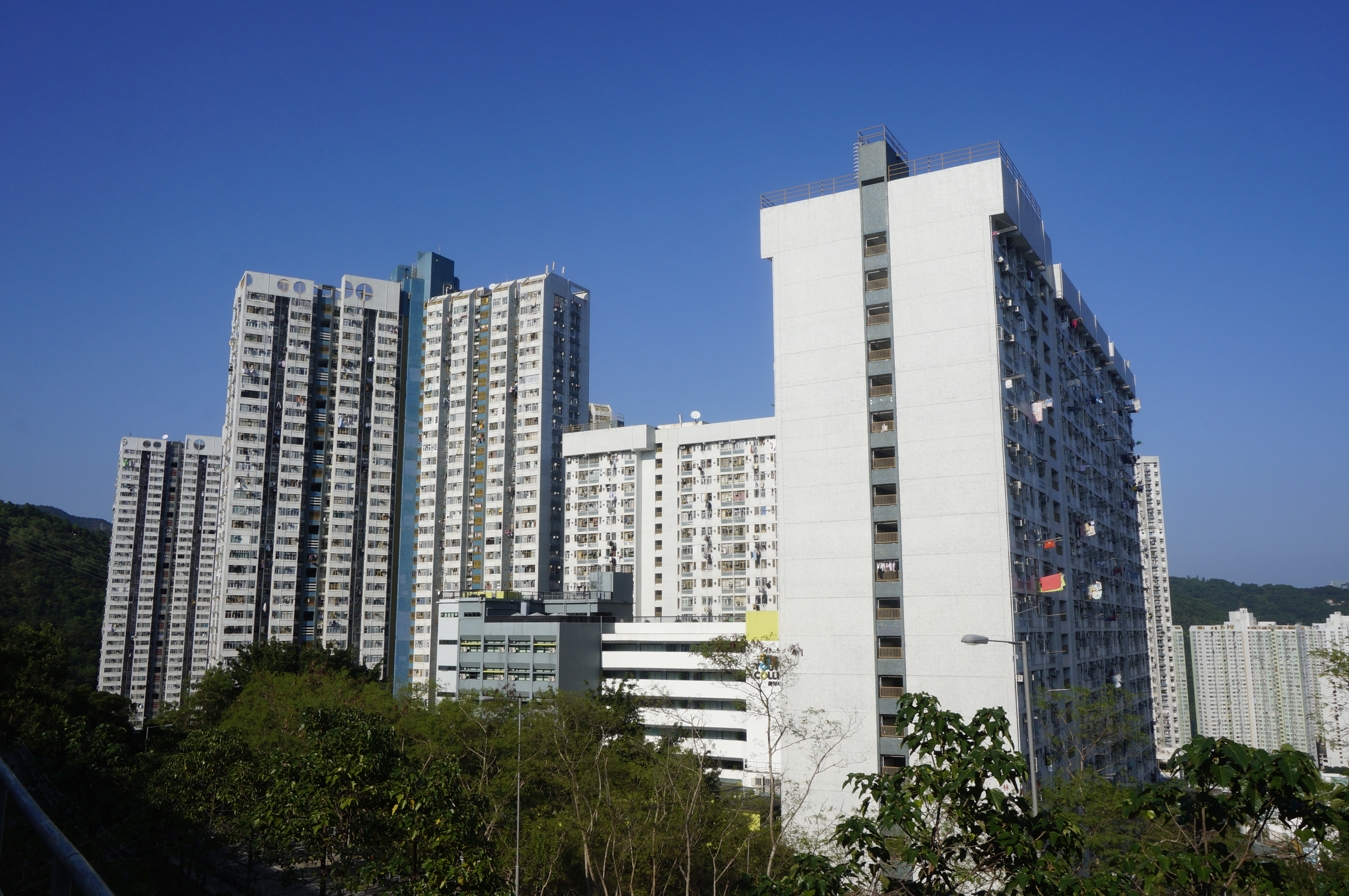
Tsui Lam Estate

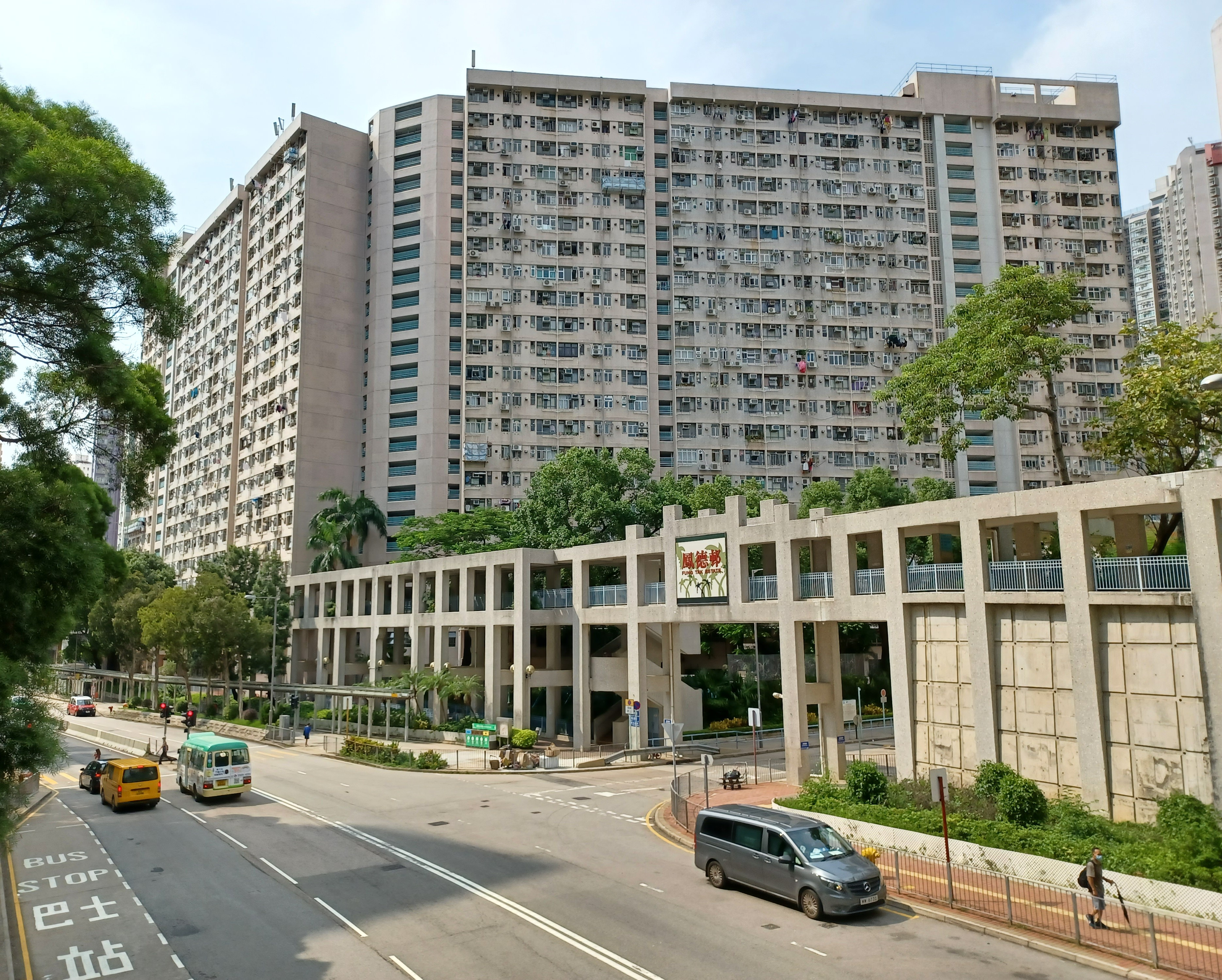
Ban Fung House & Ngan Fung House, Fung Tak Estate

== See also ==
- Old Slab
- Public housing in Hong Kong
- Types of public housing estate blocks in Hong Kong
