= Trident 2 =

Trident 2 may refer to:

- Dennis Trident 2, bus manufactured in England between 1997 and 2018
- Hawker Siddeley Trident 2E, aeroplane manufactured in England in the 1960s
- Trident II, a submarine-launched ballistic missile
- Trident 2, a design found in public housing blocks of Hong Kong
