= Cruciform block =

Type of housing in Hong Kong

Cruciform blocks are a type of housing commonly found in public housing estates and Home Ownership Scheme (HOS) courts in Hong Kong. They are cross-shaped blocks, 20 to 40 stories high depending on location, with eight to ten units per floor. They were built between 1980 and 2005, and exist in two designs, known as Old and New Cruciform.

== Old Cruciform ==
Old Cruciform blocks predate New Cruciform. It is the first design to be a part of the HOS cruciform category developed by the Hong Kong Housing Authority, developed in 1976. The first blocks are located in Yue Shing Court, completed in 1980. The last blocks are located in Siu Shan Court, completed in 1984.

Old Cruciform blocks usually have eight units per floor and a height of 20 stories or less. Most are conjoined with others. This has three variants, with an area of only 492–563 ft^{2}.

Previously, most were located in public housing estates. In 1979, the authority converted the units into HOS housing. The only block to be located in an estate is located at Sun Tin Wai Estate, which is currently public rental housing.

== New Cruciform ==
The New Cruciform design is improved from Old Cruciform. It is common in public housing estates and HOS courts.

=== Overview ===
The new design appeared in 1983. The first blocks are located at Ching Wah Court, Tuen Mun, Tsing Yi, Kwai Tsing, Kam On Court, Ma On Shan, Sha Tin, which were all completed in 1987. Another batch is located at Tung Tao Court, Shau Kei Wan, Eastern Dist., HK.

=== Design ===
New Cruciform blocks were designed exclusively for HOS courts. Therefore, they have only ten units per story. There are two bedrooms for each unit. Three-bedroom units are rare, and look like private housing. Each story has two three-unit wings and two two-unit wings.

The block at Wo Che Estate was originally to have a cross-shaped design, but because of terrain and noise restrictions, it was changed into a T-shaped one with only six units per floor. Four of the units have two-bedroom designs, while the other two have three-bedroom designs.

=== Improvements in design ===
By the end of 1998, property prices dropped because of a housing policy. The authority had to reduce HOS units. In 2002, the government suspended the construction of HOS courts. HOS blocks are converted into public rental housing. It faced problems, like, aging population and falling birth rates.

Layouts had not changed that much since introduction. The elevators changed into "high-to-low" and "single-double" design. It produced problems, like not stopping on the same floor. Windows at elevator lobbies were changed. Original partitions are used to give bathrooms and windows more space. Therefore, it became the "new version of the New Cruciform".

Windows of stairs were very small at the time. The new design adopted an improved design that became similar to Concord blocks.

From 1987 to 2005, there are 59 blocks in HOS courts in Hong Kong and Kowloon, 97 in New Territories, 63 in public housing estates, and 4 in government quarters. Therefore, there are 223 blocks total.

== Gallery ==
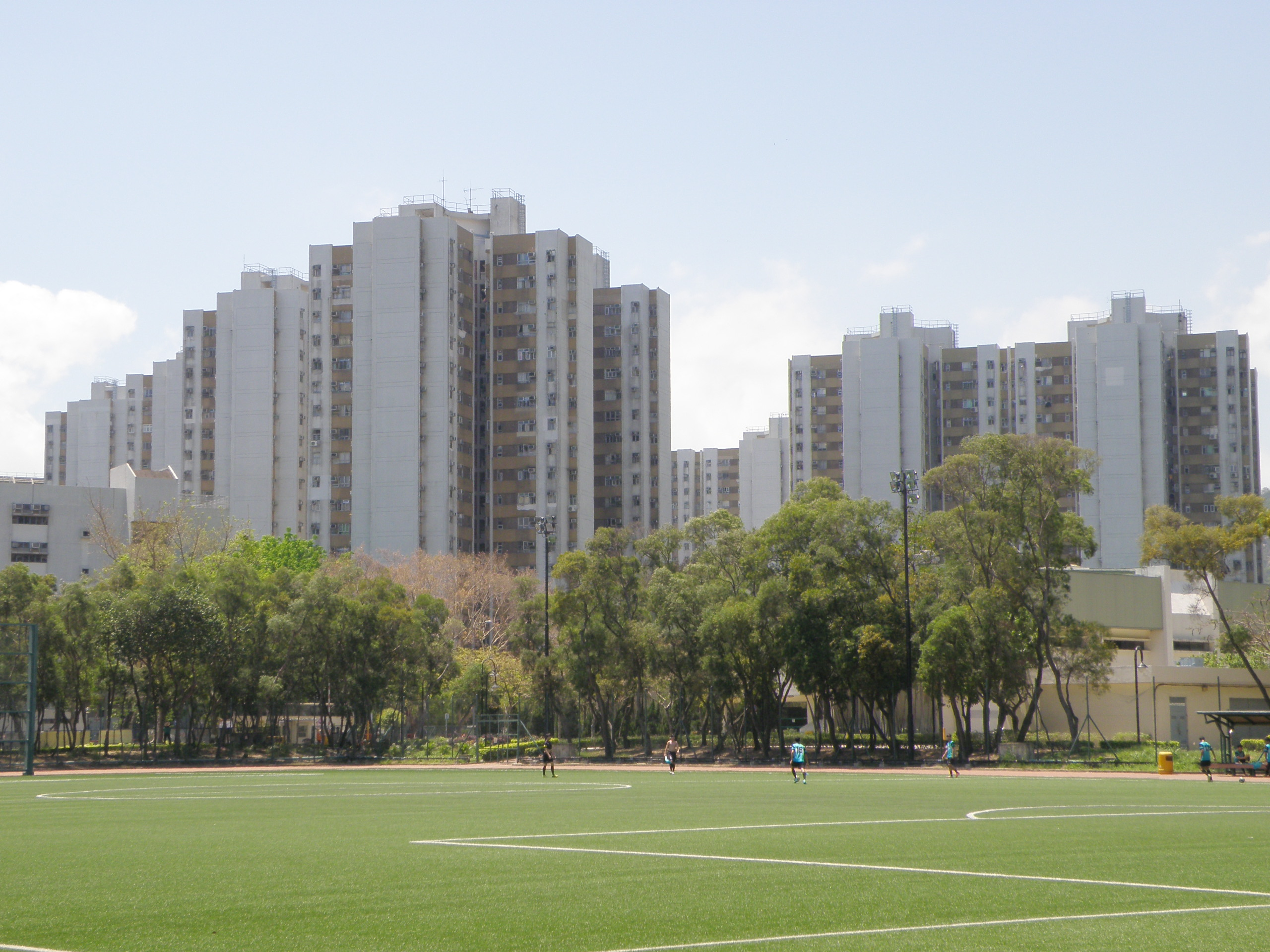
Siu Shan Court

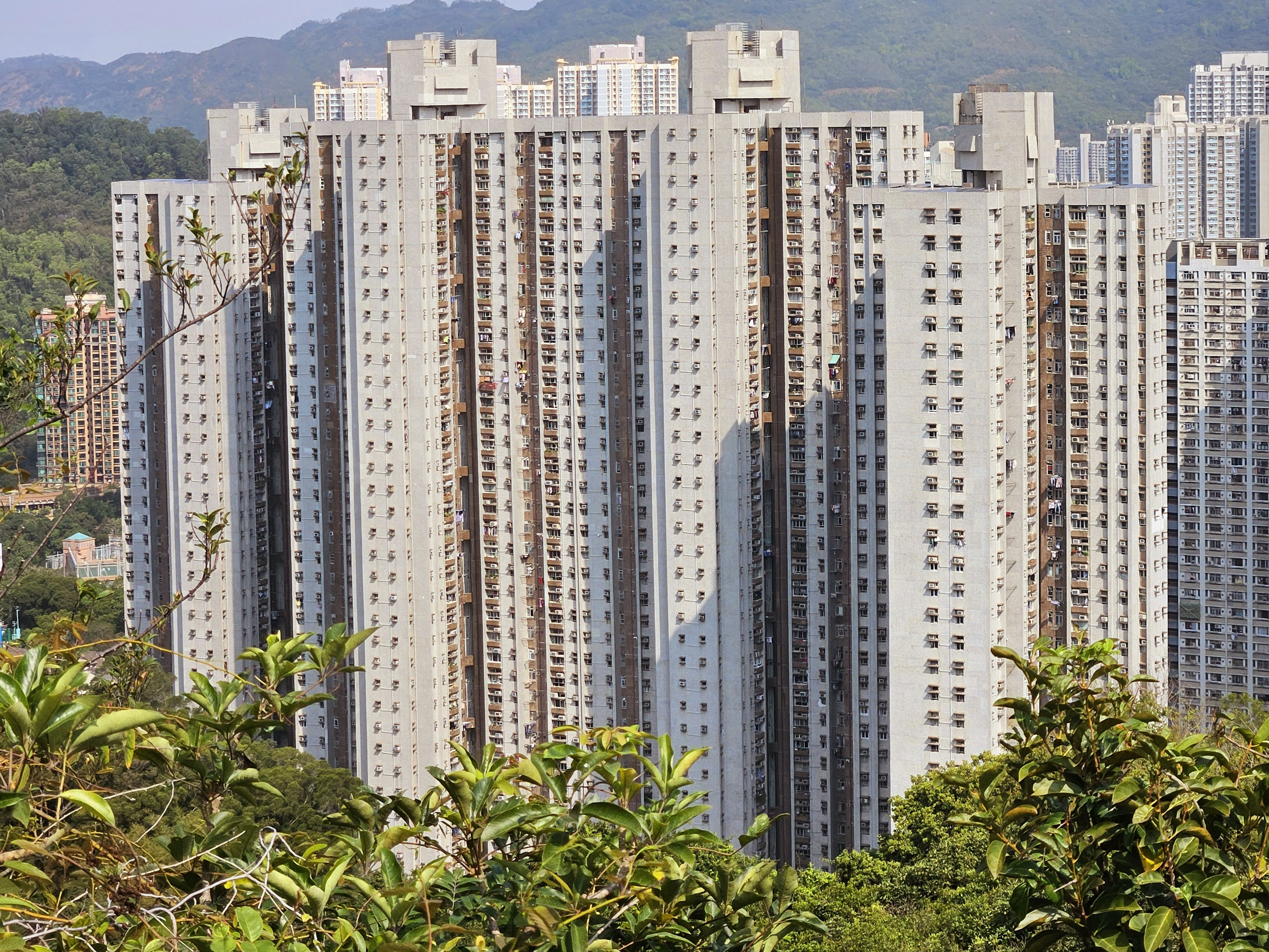
Ching Wah Court

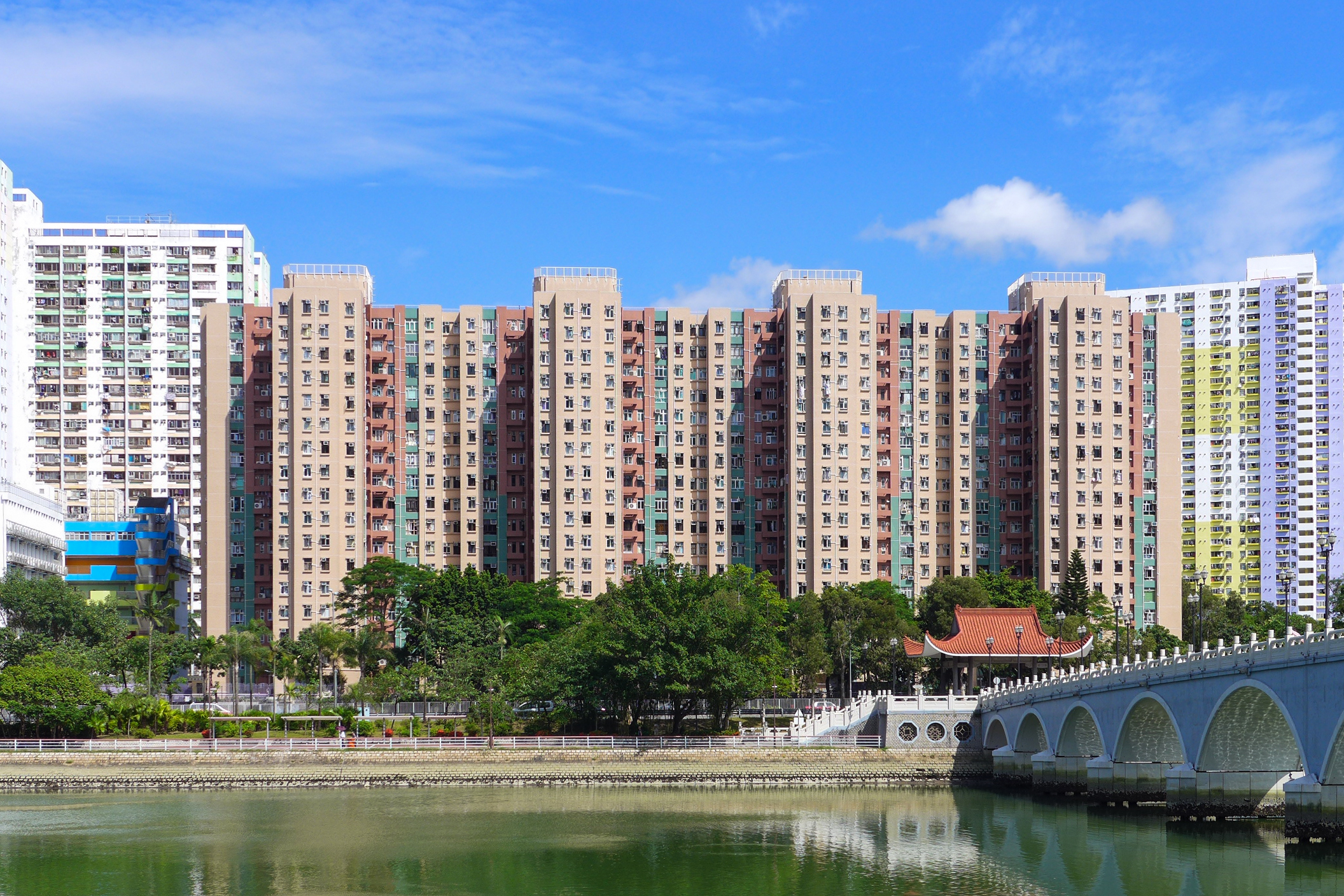
Yue Shing Court

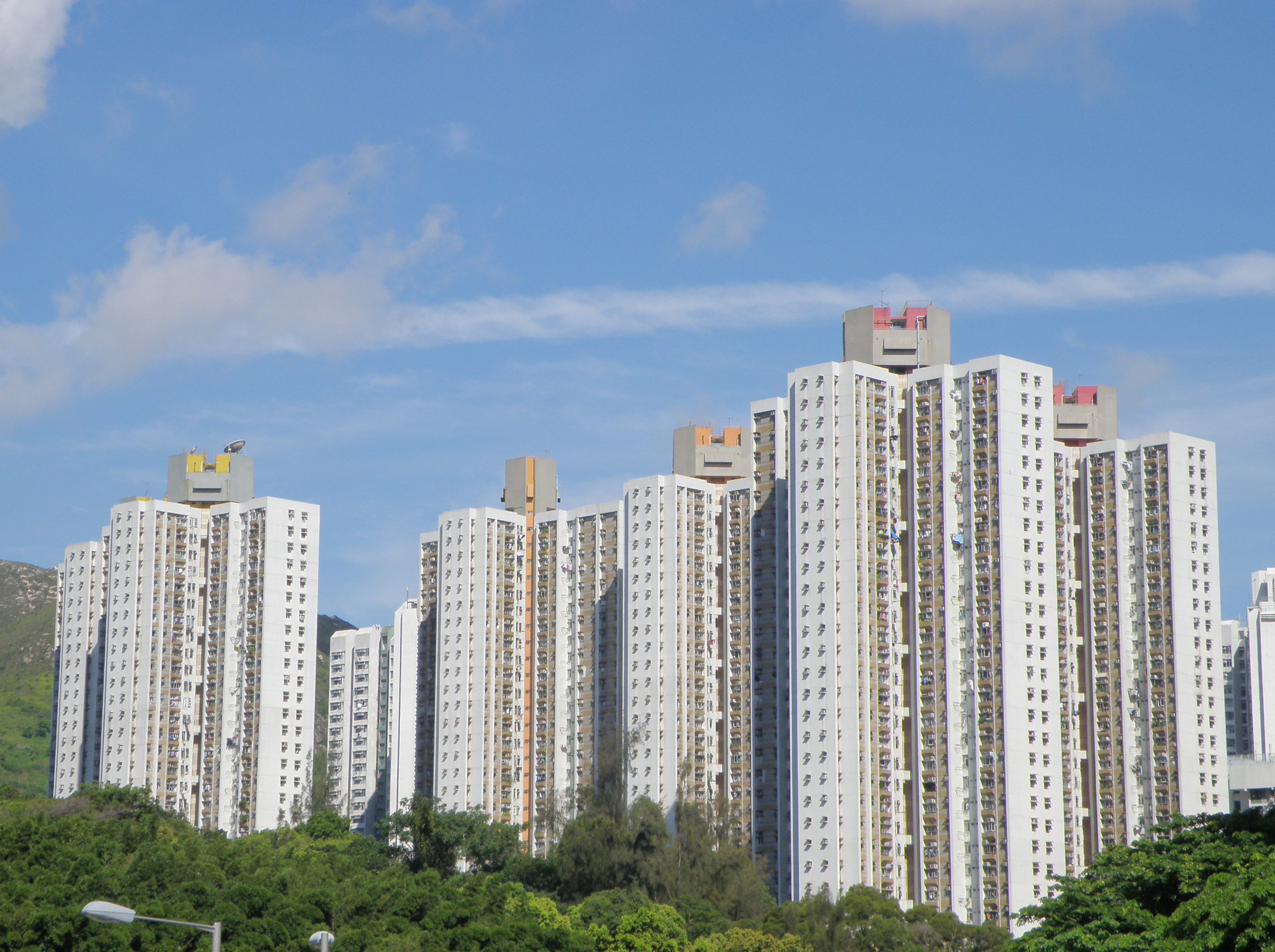
San Wai Court

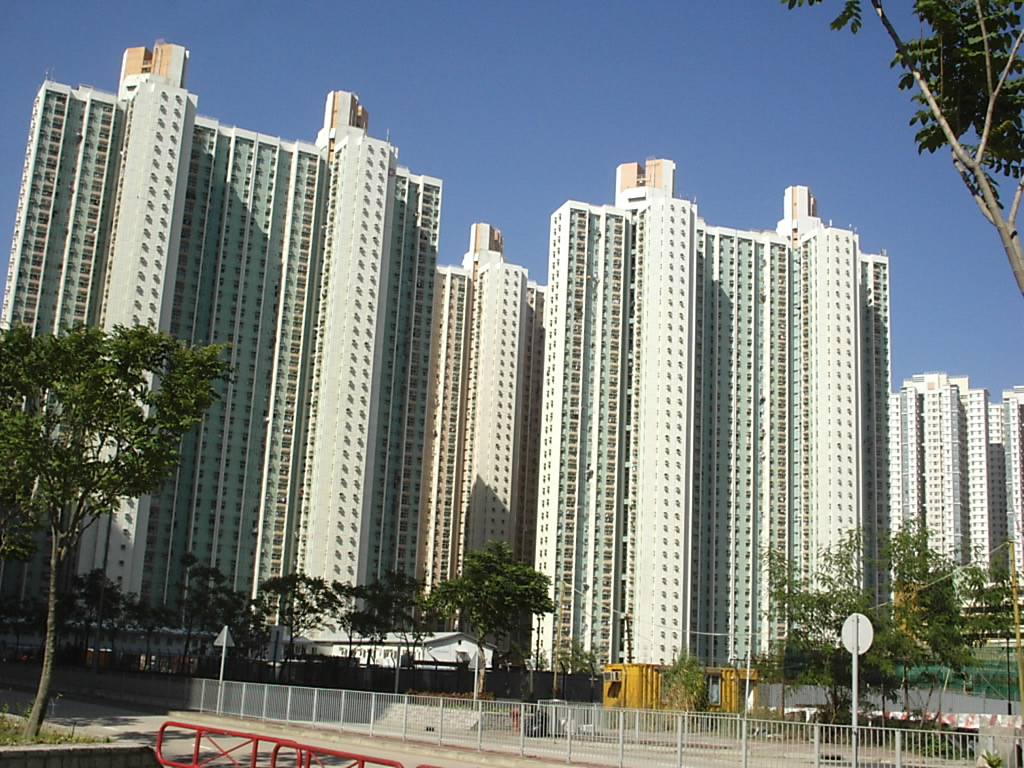
Tin Yat Estate

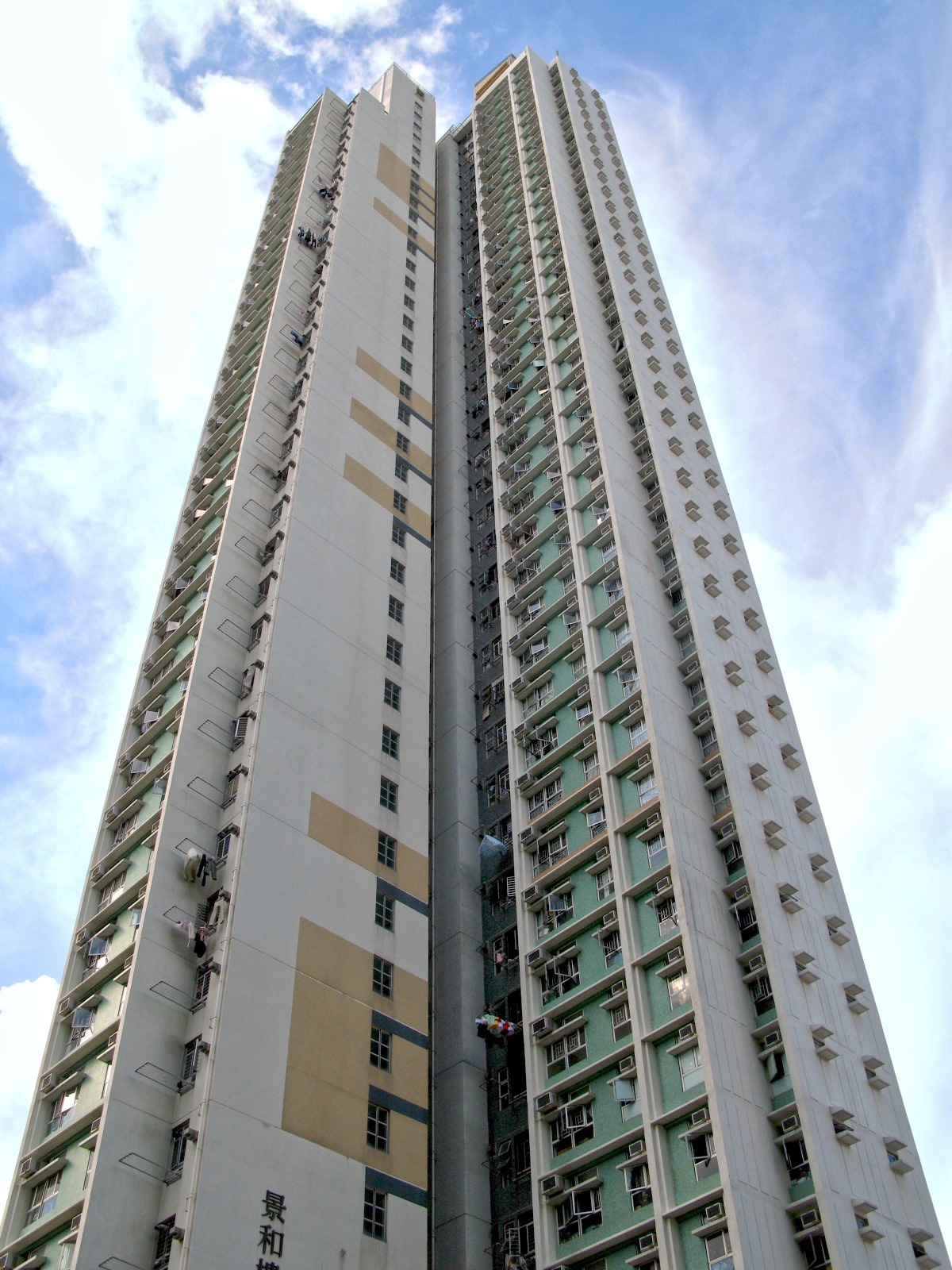
Wo Che Estate

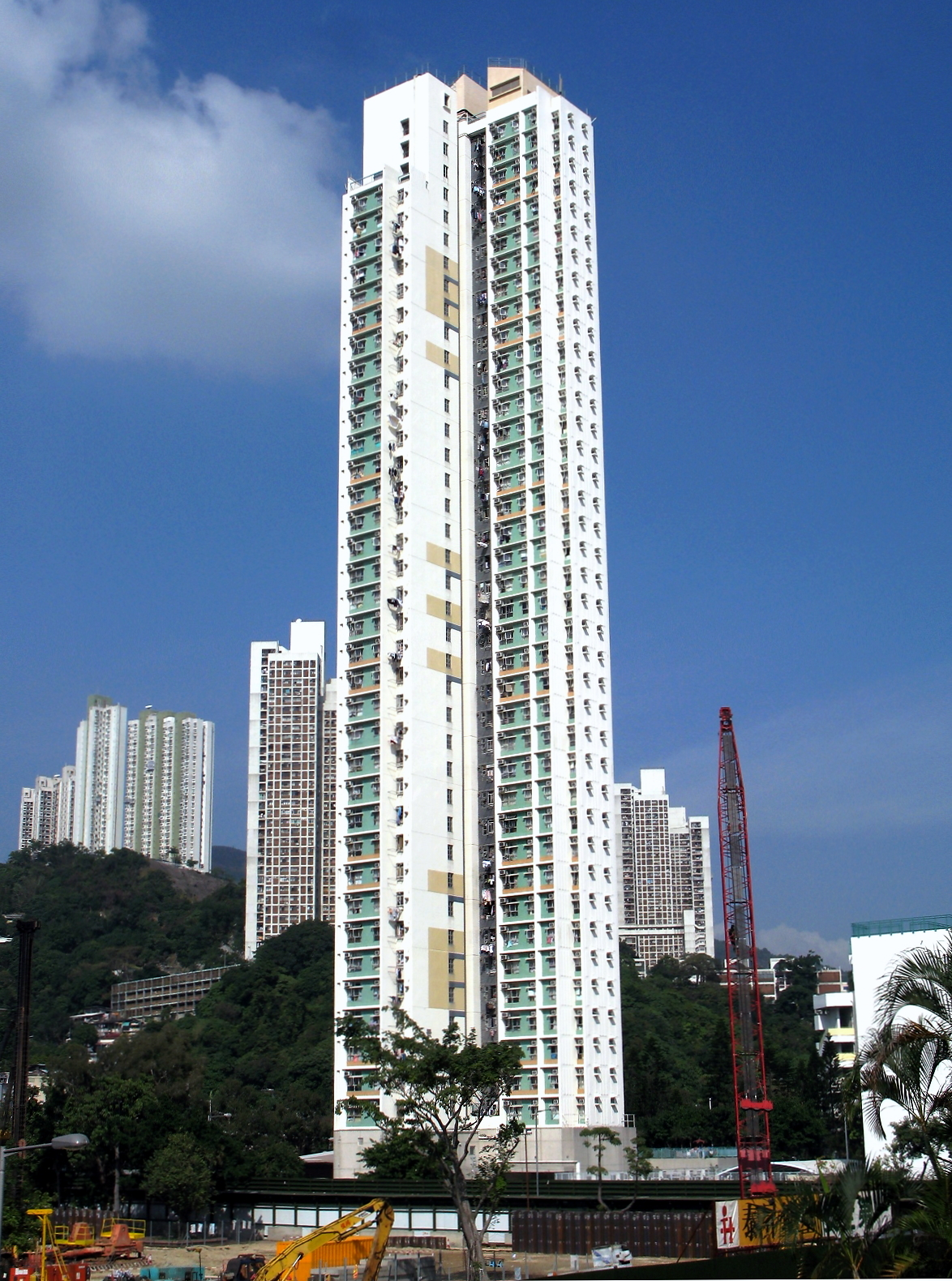
Wo Che Estate

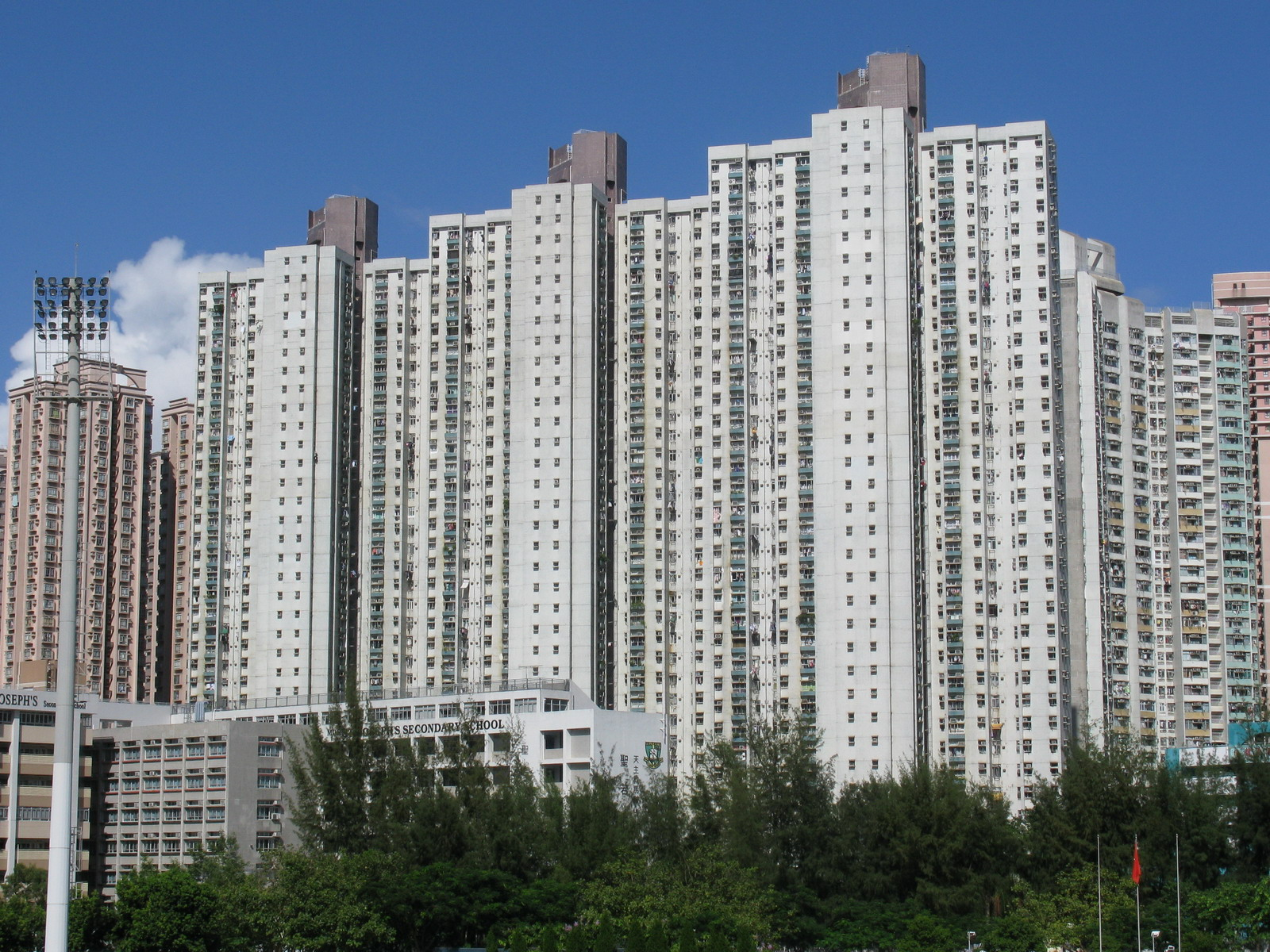
Kam Hay Court

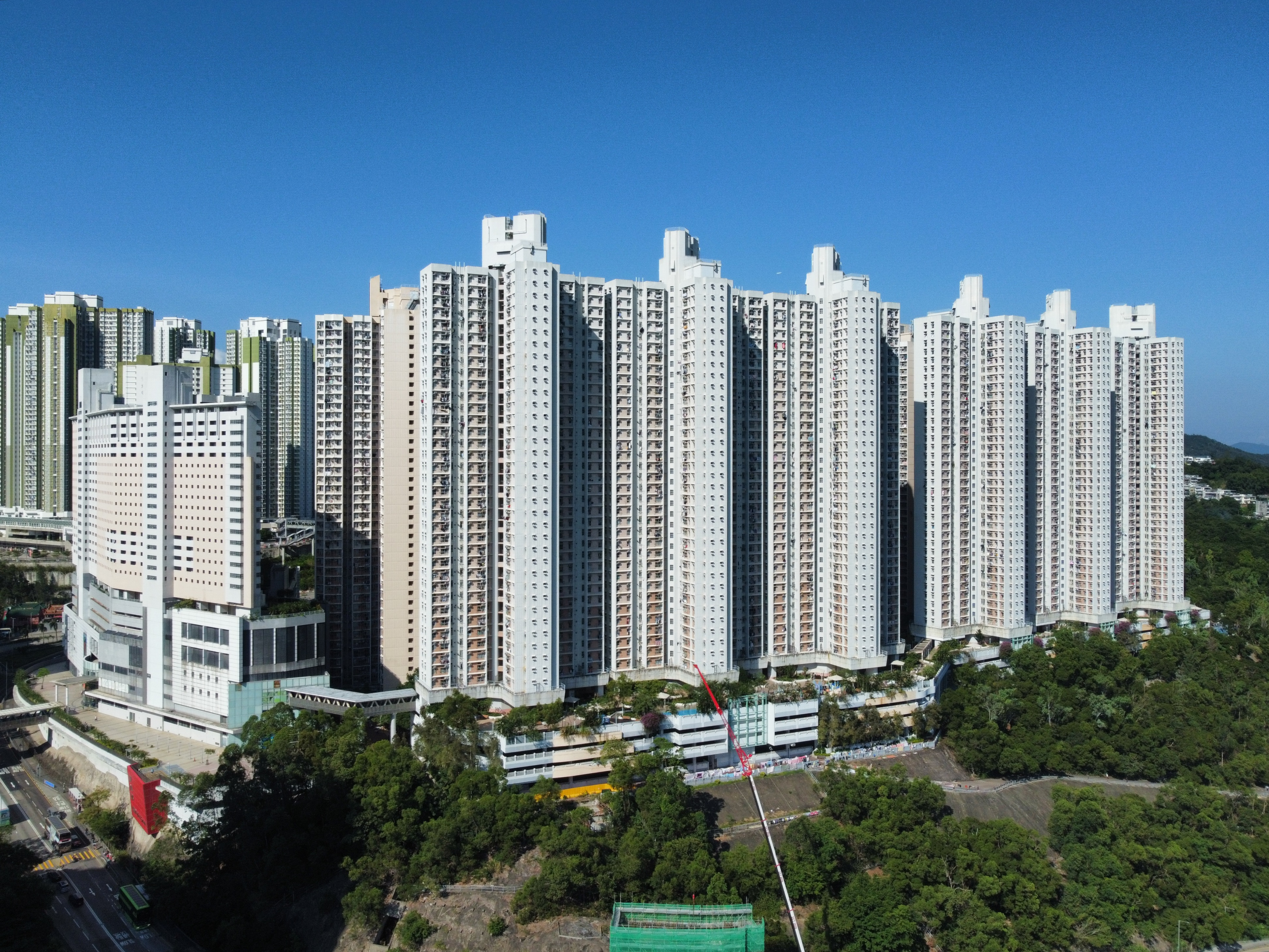
Po Tat Estate

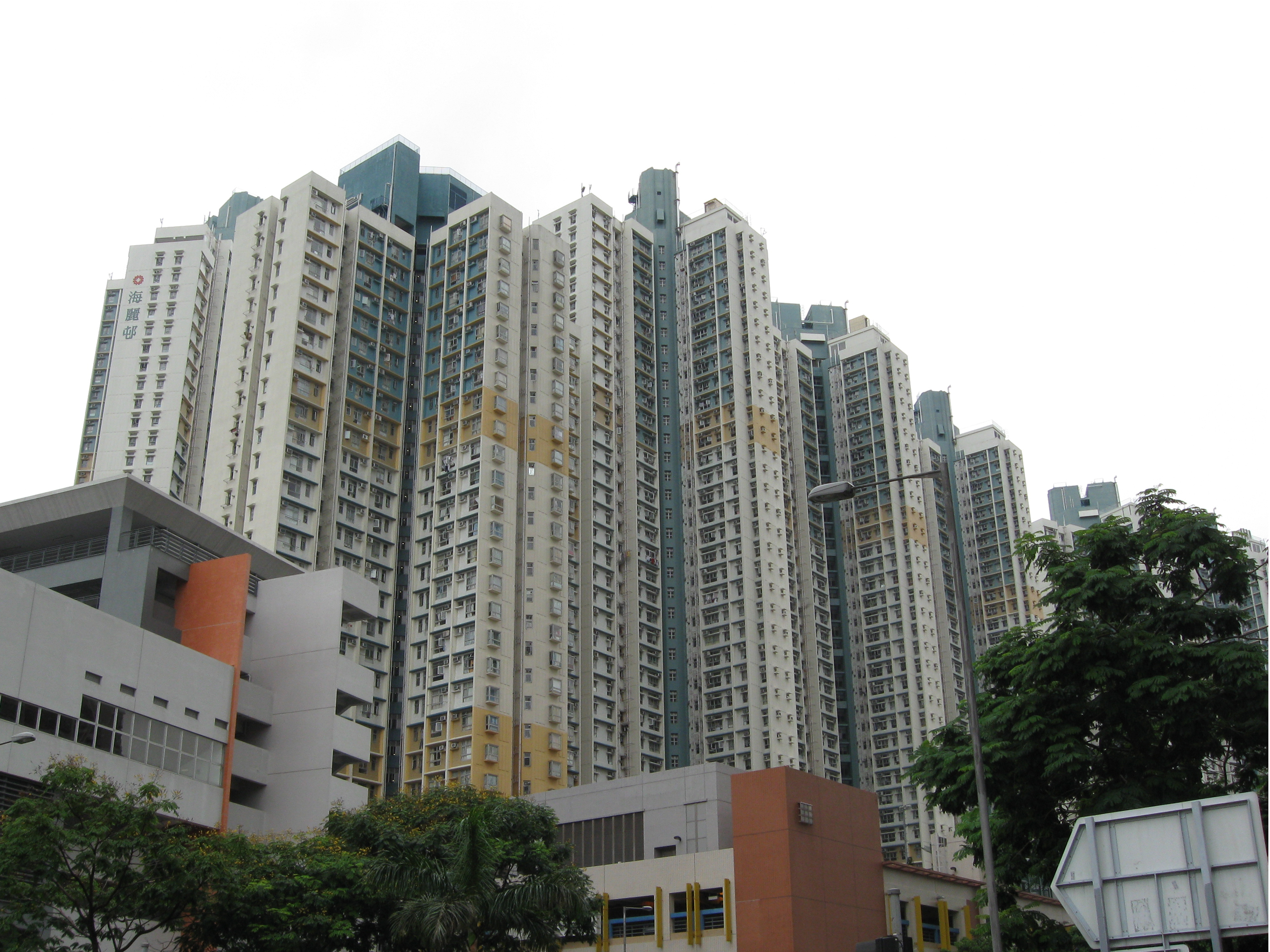
Hoi Lai Estate

== See also ==
- Types of public housing estate blocks in Hong Kong
- Concord Block
- Harmony Block
- Trident Block
