= Tsui Lam (constituency) =

Constituency of the Sai Kung District Council of Hong Kong

- Elected constituency for the Sai Kung District Council
- Boundary of Tsui Lam in Sai Kung District
- District: Sai Kung
- Legislative Council constituency: New Territories South East
- Population: 14,821 (2019)
- Electorate: 11,130 (2019)

Current constituency
- Created: 1991
- Number of members: One
- Member: Daryl Choi Ming-hei (Independent)

Tsui Lam (Chinese: 翠林) is one of the 29 constituencies in the Sai Kung District.

The constituency returns one district councillor to the Sai Kung District Council, with an election every four years.

Tsui Lam constituency is loosely based on Tsui Lam Estate in Po Lam with estimated population of 14,821.

== Councillors represented ==
Election	Member	Party
1991	Wong Kwok-yee	Nonpartisan
1994	Shek Chi-keung	Democratic
2006	Shek Chi-keung	Nonpartisan
2007	Lanny Tam	Civil Force
2014	Lanny Tam	NPP/CF
2019	Lanny Tam	Nonpartisan
2019	Daryl Choi Ming-hei	Independent democrat

== Election results ==
=== 2010s ===
Sai Kung District Council Election, 2019: Tsui Lam
Party	Candidate	Votes	%	±%
Ind. democrat	Daryl Choi Ming-hei	4,222	55.47	
Nonpartisan	Lanny Tam	3,389	44.53	
Majority		833	10.94	
Turnout		7,625	68.58	
Ind. democrat gain from Nonpartisan		Swing		
