= Tsui Wan Estate =

Public housing estate in Chai Wan, Hong Kong

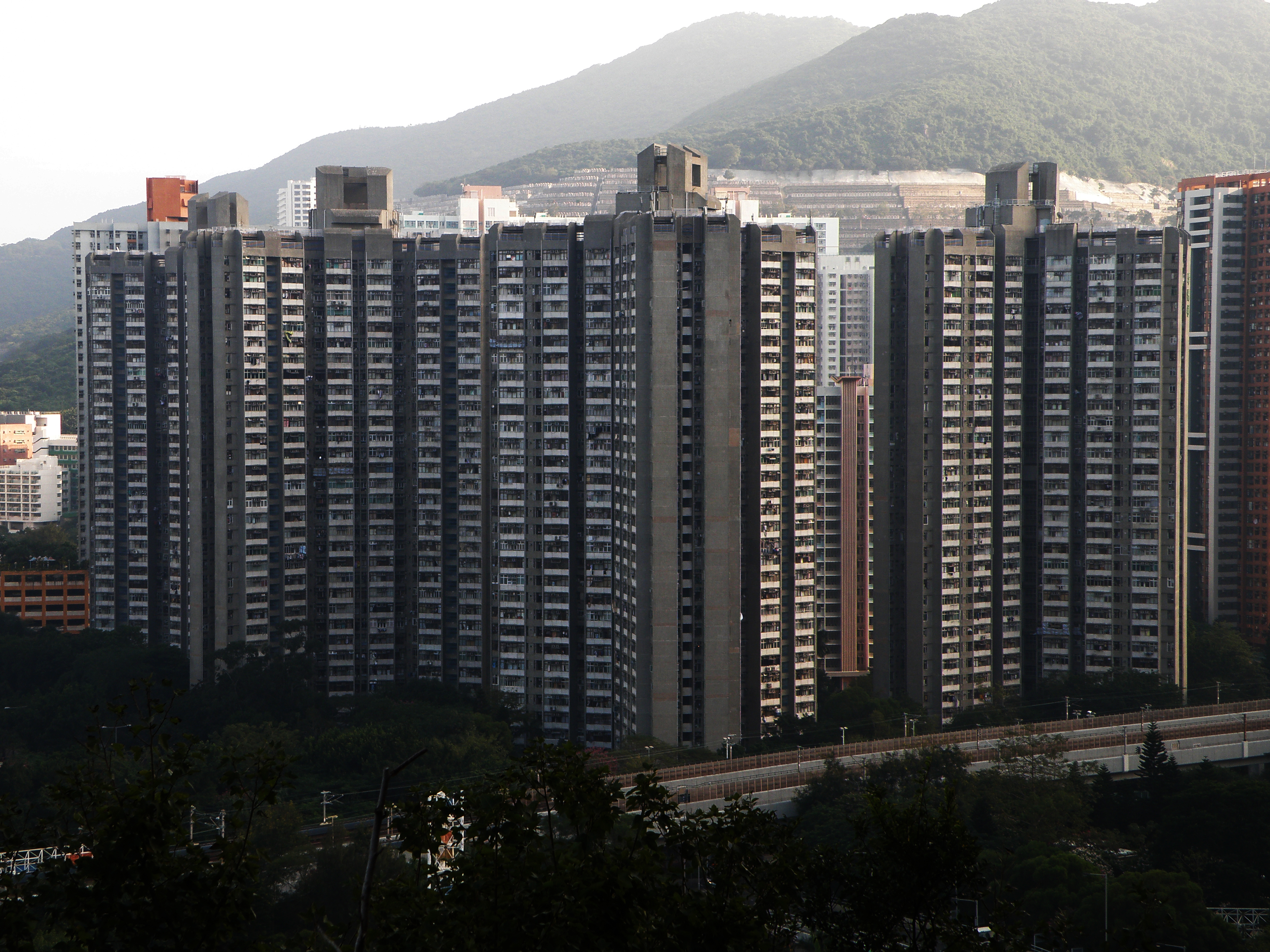
- Tsui Wan Estate
- Interactive map of Tsui Wan Estate

General information
- Location: 3 Tsui Wan Street, Chai Wan; Hong Kong Island, Hong Kong
- Coordinates: 22.2680619°N 114.2399175°E
- Status: Completed
- Category: Public rental housing
- Population: 6,446 (2016)
- No. of blocks: 4
- No. of units: 703

Construction
- Constructed: 1988; 38 years ago
- Authority: Hong Kong Housing Authority

Tsui Wan Estate (Chinese: 翠灣邨) is a public housing estate in Chai Wan, Hong Kong Island, Hong Kong, near Chai Wan Park, Yue Wan Estate and Tsui Lok Estate. Built on the reclaimed land in Chai Wan, the estate consists of 4 residential blocks completed in 1988. In 1999, some of the flats were sold to tenants through Tenants Purchase Scheme Phase 2.

Tsui Lok Estate (Chinese: 翠樂邨) is a public housing estate in Chai Wan, located near Chai Wan Park, Yue Wan Estate and Tsui Wan Estate. Built on the former site of Yue Wan Temporary Housing Area (Chinese: 漁灣臨時房屋區) on reclaimed land in Chai Wan, the estate consists of only 1 residential block built in 1999.

Hang Tsui Court (Chinese: 杏翠苑) is a Home Ownership Scheme court on the reclaimed land in Chai Wan, near Chai Wan Park, Yue Wan Estate, Tsui Wan Estate and Tsui Lok Estate. It has 2 blocks built in 1997.

== Houses ==
=== Tsui Wan Estate ===
Name	Chinese name	Building type	Completed
Tsui Fuk House	翠褔樓	Trident 4	1988
Tsui Hong House	翠康樓	Trident 4	1988
Tsui Ning House	翠寧樓	Trident 4	1988
Tsui Shou House	翠壽樓	Trident 4	1988

=== Tsui Lok Estate ===
Name	Chinese name	Building type	Completed
Tsui Luk House	翠祿樓	Small Household Block	1999

=== Hang Tsui Court ===
Name	Chinese name	Building type	Completed
Tsui Ching House	翠晶閣	NCB (Ver.1984)	1997
Tsui Ying House	翠瑩閣	NCB (Ver.1984)	1997

Hang Tsui Court is in Primary One Admission (POA) School Net 16. Within the school net are multiple aided schools (operated independently but funded with government money) and two government schools: Shau Kei Wan Government Primary School and Aldrich Bay Government Primary School.

== Demographics ==
According to the 2016 by-census, Tsui Wan Estate had a population of 6,446. The median age was 48.1 and the majority of residents (97.2 per cent) were of Chinese ethnicity. The average household size was 2.9 people. The median monthly household income of all households (i.e. including both economically active and inactive households) was HK$25,000.

== Politics ==
Tsui Wan Estate, Tsui Lok Estate and Hang Tsui Court are located in Tsui Wan constituency of the Eastern District Council. It is currently represented by Ku Kwai-yiu, who was elected in the 2019 elections.

== Education ==
Tsui Wan Estate is in Primary One Admission (POA) School Net 16. Within the school net are multiple aided schools (operated independently but funded with government money) and two government schools: Shau Kei Wan Government Primary School and Aldrich Bay Government Primary School.

== See also ==
- Public housing estates in Chai Wan and Siu Sai Wan
