= King Lam Estate =

Public housing estate in Tseung Kwan O, Hong Kong

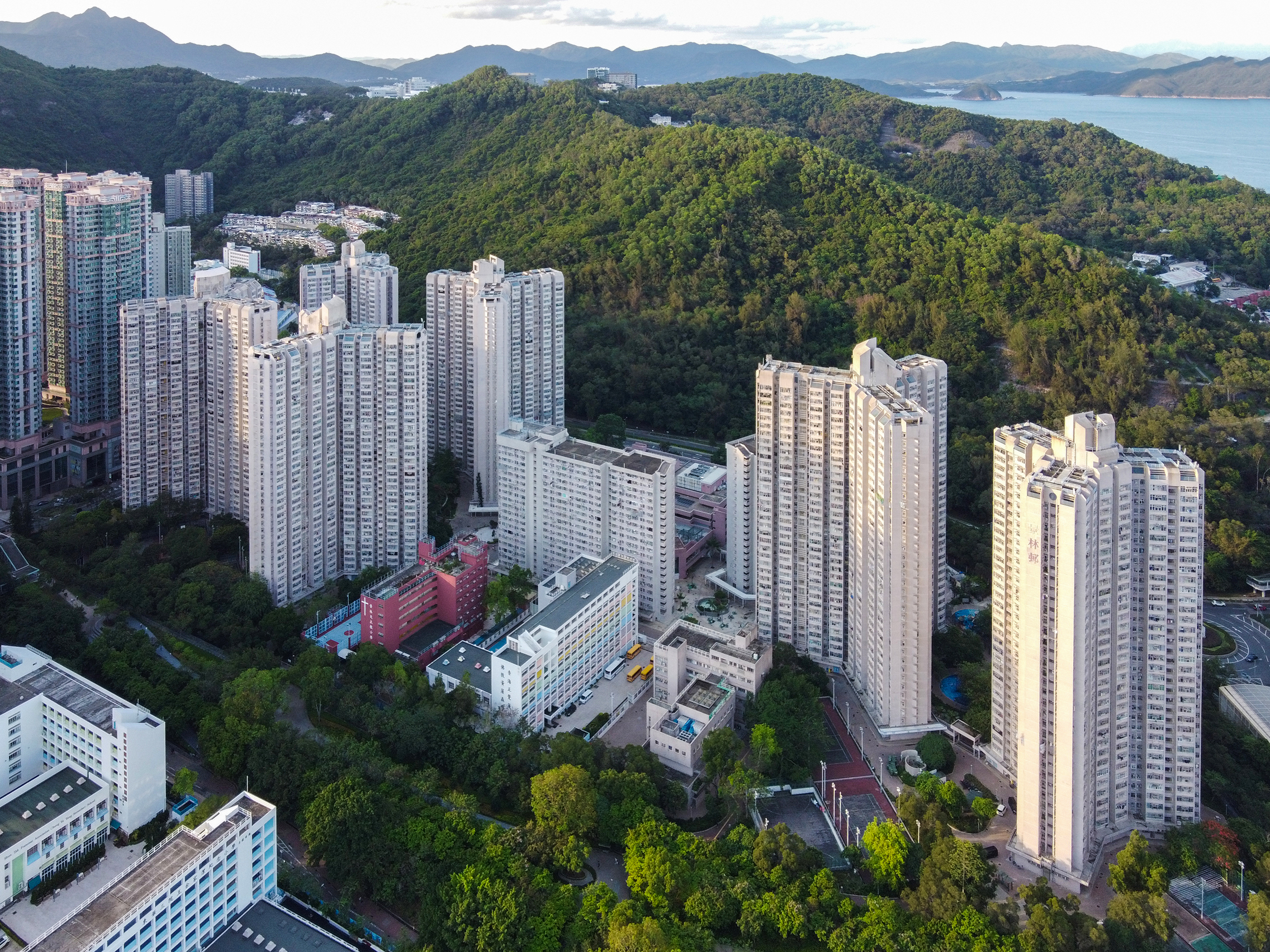
- King Lam Estate
- Interactive map of King Lam Estate

General information
- Location: 38 Po Lam Road North, Tseung Kwan O New Territories, Hong Kong
- Coordinates: 22.32055°N 114.26095°E
- Status: Completed
- Category: Public rental housing
- Population: 14,367 (2016)
- No. of blocks: 7
- No. of units: 2,047

Construction
- Constructed: 1990; 36 years ago
- Authority: Hong Kong Housing Authority

King Lam Estate (Chinese: 景林邨) is a mixed TPS and public housing estate in Tseung Kwan O, New Territories, Hong Kong near MTR Po Lam station. It is the third public housing estate in Tseung Kwan O and has a total of seven residential blocks built in 1990. Some of the flats were sold to tenants through Tenants Purchase Scheme Phase 4 in 2001.

Ho Ming Court (浩明苑) is a Home Ownership Scheme housing court in Tseung Kwan O near King Lam Estate. It has only one residential block built in 1990.

== Houses ==
=== King Lam Estate ===
Name	Chinese name	Building type	Completed
King Lui House	景櫚樓	New Slab	1990
King Chung House	景松樓	New Slab	1990
King Min House	景棉樓	Trident 3 (Early Gen.)	1990
King Tao House	景桃樓	Trident 3 (Late Gen.)	1990
King Yu House	景榆樓	Trident 3 (Late Gen.)	1990
King Nam House	景楠樓	Trident 4 (Early Gen.)	1990
King Yung House	景榕樓	Trident 4 (Late Gen.)	1990

=== Ho Ming Court ===
Name	Chinese name	Building type	Completed
Ho Ming Court	浩明苑	Trident 3 (Late Gen.)	1990

== Demographics ==
According to the 2016 by-census, King Lam Estate had a population of 14,367. The median age was 52 and the majority of residents (98.2 per cent) were of Chinese ethnicity. The average household size was 2.8 people. The median monthly household income of all households (i.e. including both economically active and inactive households) was HK$26,000.

== Politics ==
King Lam Estate and Ho Ming Court are located in King Lam constituency of the Sai Kung District Council. It was formerly represented by Cheung Wai-chiu, who was elected in the 2019 elections until July 2021.

== See also ==
- Public housing estates in Tseung Kwan O
