= Tin Yat Estate =

Public housing estate in Tin Shui Wai, Hong Kong

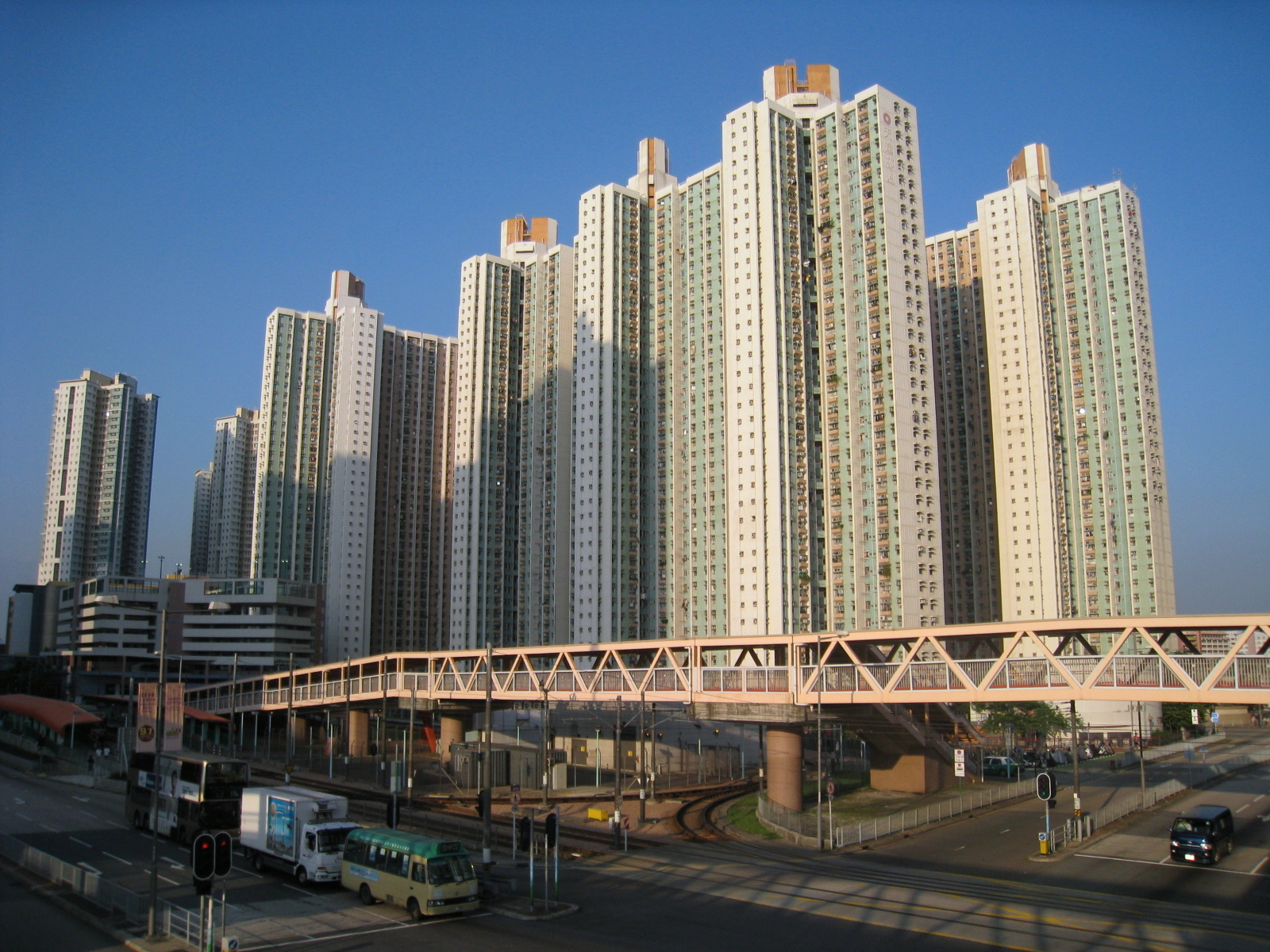
- Tin Yat Estate
- Interactive map of Tin Yat Estate

General information
- Location: 76 Tin Shui Road, Tin Shui Wai; New Territories, Hong Kong
- Coordinates: 22.467372°N 113.999013°E
- Status: Completed
- Category: Public rental housing
- Population: 14,589 (2016)
- No. of blocks: 9
- No. of units: 3,330

Construction
- Constructed: 2001; 25 years ago
- Authority: Hong Kong Housing Authority

Tin Yat Estate (Chinese: 天逸邨) is a public housing estate in Tin Shui Wai, New Territories, Hong Kong, near Light Rail Tin Yat stop. It consists of nine residential buildings completed in 2001.

== Background ==
According to the Hong Kong Directory published in 2001, Tin Yat Estate was originally a Home Ownership Scheme housing estate known as Yat Tin Court, but there is a difference in the housing estates in Tin Shui Wai, the word "Tin" is usually placed in front. Later, because the government planned to shorten the waiting period for public housing to three years, the entire batch of housing estates in Phase 23B, including Yat Tin Court, were converted into public housing for lease.

== Houses ==
Name	Chinese name	Building type	Completed
Yat Chi House	逸池樓	New Cruciform (Ver.1984)	2001
Yat Hoi House	逸海樓	New Cruciform (Ver.1984)	2001
Yat Kong House	逸江樓	New Cruciform (Ver.1984)	2001
Yat Long House	逸浪樓	New Cruciform (Ver.1984)	2001
Yat Wan House	逸灣樓	New Cruciform (Ver.1984)	2001
Yat To House	逸濤樓	New Cruciform (Ver.1984)	2001
Yat Tam House	逸潭樓	New Cruciform (Ver.1984)	2001
Yat Wu House	逸湖樓	New Cruciform (Ver.1984)	2001
Yat Yeung House	逸洋樓	New Cruciform (Ver.1984)	2001

== Demographics ==
According to the 2016 by-census, Tin Yat Estate had a population of 14,589. The median age was 32.6 and the majority of residents (96.2 per cent) were of Chinese ethnicity. The average household size was 4.4 people. The median monthly household income of all households (i.e. including both economically active and inactive households) was HK$29,000.

== Politics ==
For the 2019 District Council election, the estate fell within two constituencies. Most of the estate is located in the Yat Chak constituency, which is represented by Wong Wing-sze. The remainder falls within the Wang Yat constituency, which is represented by Mo Kai-hong.

== See also ==
- Public housing estates in Tin Shui Wai
