= Fung Wah Estate =

Public housing estate in Chai Wan, Hong Kong

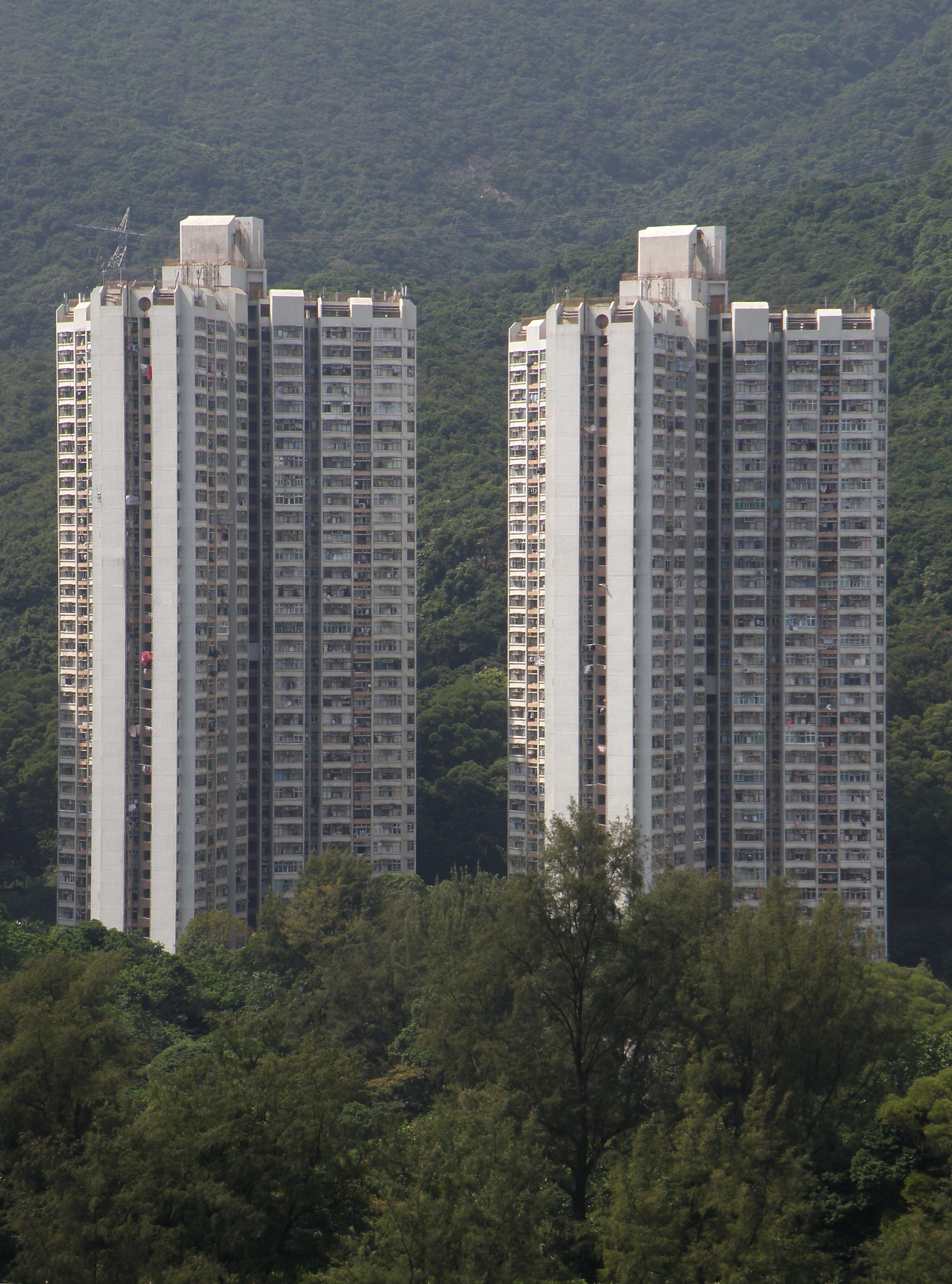
- Fung Wah Estate
- Interactive map of Fung Wah Estate

General information
- Location: 4-6 Fung Ha Road, Chai Wan; Hong Kong Island, Hong Kong
- Coordinates: 22.260648°N 114.231180°E
- Status: Completed
- Category: Public rental housing
- Population: 3,580 (2016)
- No. of blocks: 2
- No. of units: 1,150

Construction
- Constructed: 1991; 35 years ago
- Authority: Hong Kong Housing Authority

Fung Wah Estate (Chinese: 峰華邨) is a mixed TPS and public housing estate on a hill in southwest Chai Wan, Hong Kong Island, Hong Kong near Cape Collinson Crematorium. It consists of two residential blocks completed in 1991. Some of the flats were sold under Tenants Purchase Scheme Phase 3 in 2000.

King Tsui Court (Chinese: 景翠苑) is a Home Ownership Scheme court in Chai Wan, next to Fung Wah Estate. It has only one residential block completed in 1991.

== Houses ==
=== Fung Wah Estate ===
Name	Chinese name	Building type	Completed
Hiu Fung House	曉峰樓	Trident 4	1991
Sau Fung House	秀峰樓	Trident 4	1991

=== King Tsui Court ===
Name	Chinese name	Building type	Completed
King Tsui Court	景翠苑	Trident 4	1991

== Demographics ==
According to the 2016 by-census, Fung Wah Estate had a population of 3,580. The median age was 46 and the majority of residents (93.3 per cent) were of Chinese ethnicity. The average household size was 2.9 people. The median monthly household income of all households (i.e. including both economically active and inactive households) was HK$25,950.

== Politics ==
Fung Wah Estate and King Tsui Court are located in Fei Tsui constituency of the Eastern District Council. It was formerly represented by Joseph Lai Chi-keong, who was elected in the 2019 elections until July 2021.

== See also ==
- Public housing estates in Chai Wan and Siu Sai Wan
