= Tak Tin Estate =

Public housing estate in Lam Tin, Hong Kong

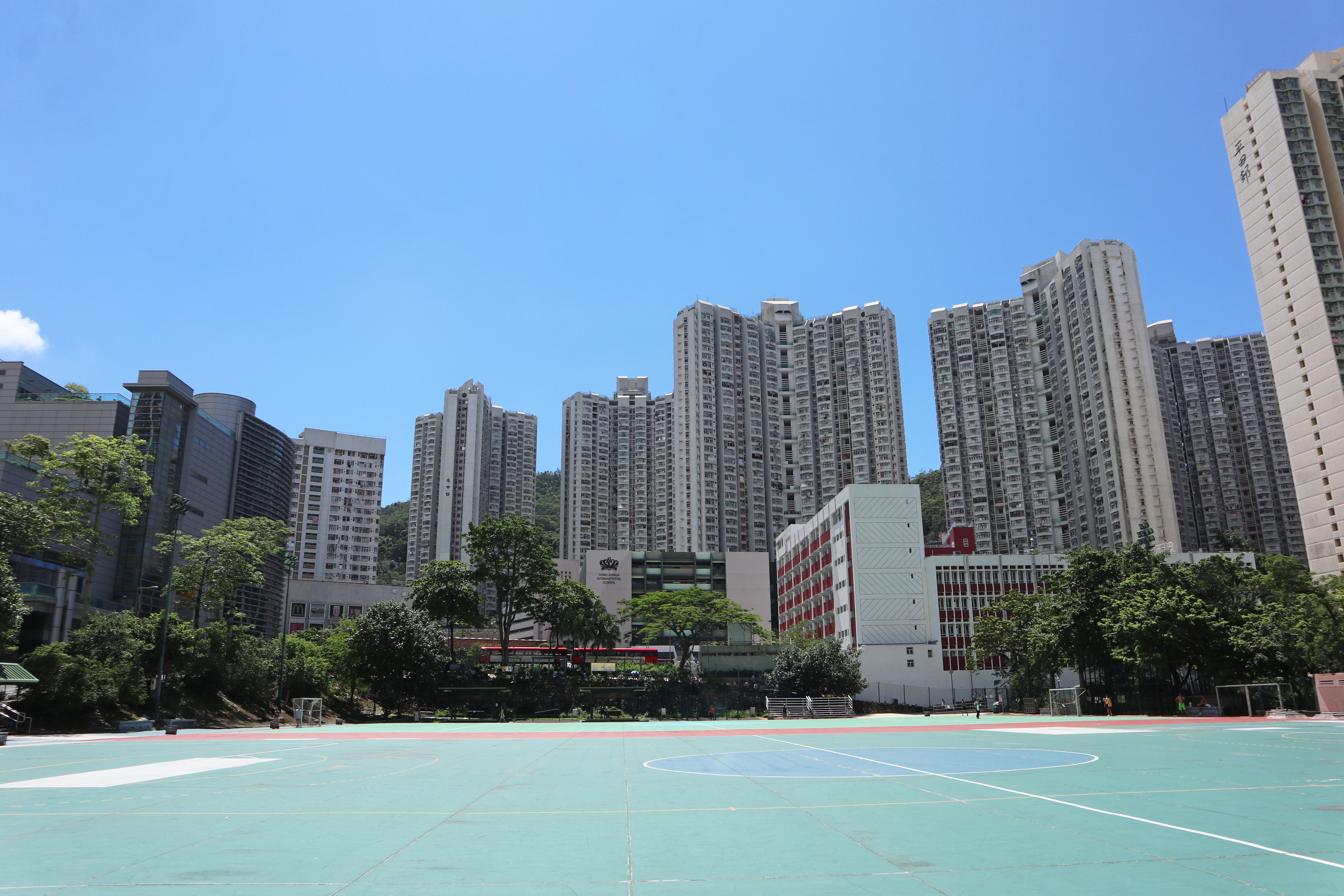
- Tak Tin Estate
- Interactive map of Tak Tin Estate

General information
- Location: 223 Pik Wan Road, Lam Tin; Kowloon, Hong Kong
- Coordinates: 22.309136°N 114.2389525°E
- Status: Completed
- Category: Tenants Purchase Scheme (TPS)
- Population: 15,317 (2016)
- No. of blocks: 9
- No. of units: 5,159

Construction
- Constructed: 1991; 35 years ago
- Authority: Hong Kong Housing Authority

Tak Tin Estate (Chinese: 德田邨) is a mixed public/TPS estate in Lam Tin, Kowloon, Hong Kong. It consists of 9 blocks completed in 1991 and 2001. In 1999, some of the flats (Tak Hong House and Tak Yan House excluded) were sold to tenants through Tenants Purchase Scheme Phase 2.

Hong Ying Court (Chinese: 康盈苑) is a Home Ownership Scheme court in Lam Tin, near Tak Tin Estate. It has one block built in 1991.

== Houses ==
=== Tak Tin Estate ===
Name	Chinese name	Building type	Completed
Tak King House	德敬樓	New Slab	1991
Tak Lai House	德禮樓	New Slab	1991
Tak Yee House	德義樓	Trident 4	1991
Tak Lok House	德樂樓	Trident 4	1991
Tak Shui House	德瑞樓	Trident 3	1991
Tak Shing House	德盛樓	Trident 3	1991
Tak Lung House	德隆樓	Trident 3	1991
Tak Hong House	德康樓	Small Household Block	2001
Tak Yan House	德欣樓	Housing for Senior Citizen	2001

=== Hong Ying Court ===
Name	Chinese name	Building type	Completed
Hong Ying Court	康盈苑	Trident 3	1991

== Demographics ==
According to the 2016 by-census, Tak Tin Estate had a population of 15,317. The median age was 53 and the majority of residents (97.8 per cent) were of Chinese ethnicity. The average household size was 2.5 people. The median monthly household income of all households (i.e. including both economically active and inactive households) was HK$22,490.

== Politics ==
For the 2019 District Council election, the estate fell within two constituencies. Most of the estate is located in the Kwong Tak constituency, which is represented by Wilson Or Chong-shing. The remainder falls within the Hing Tin constituency, which is represented by Nelson Ip Tsz-kit.

== See also ==
- Public housing estates in Lam Tin
