= Tsui Lam Estate =

Public housing estate in Tseung Kwan O, Hong Kong

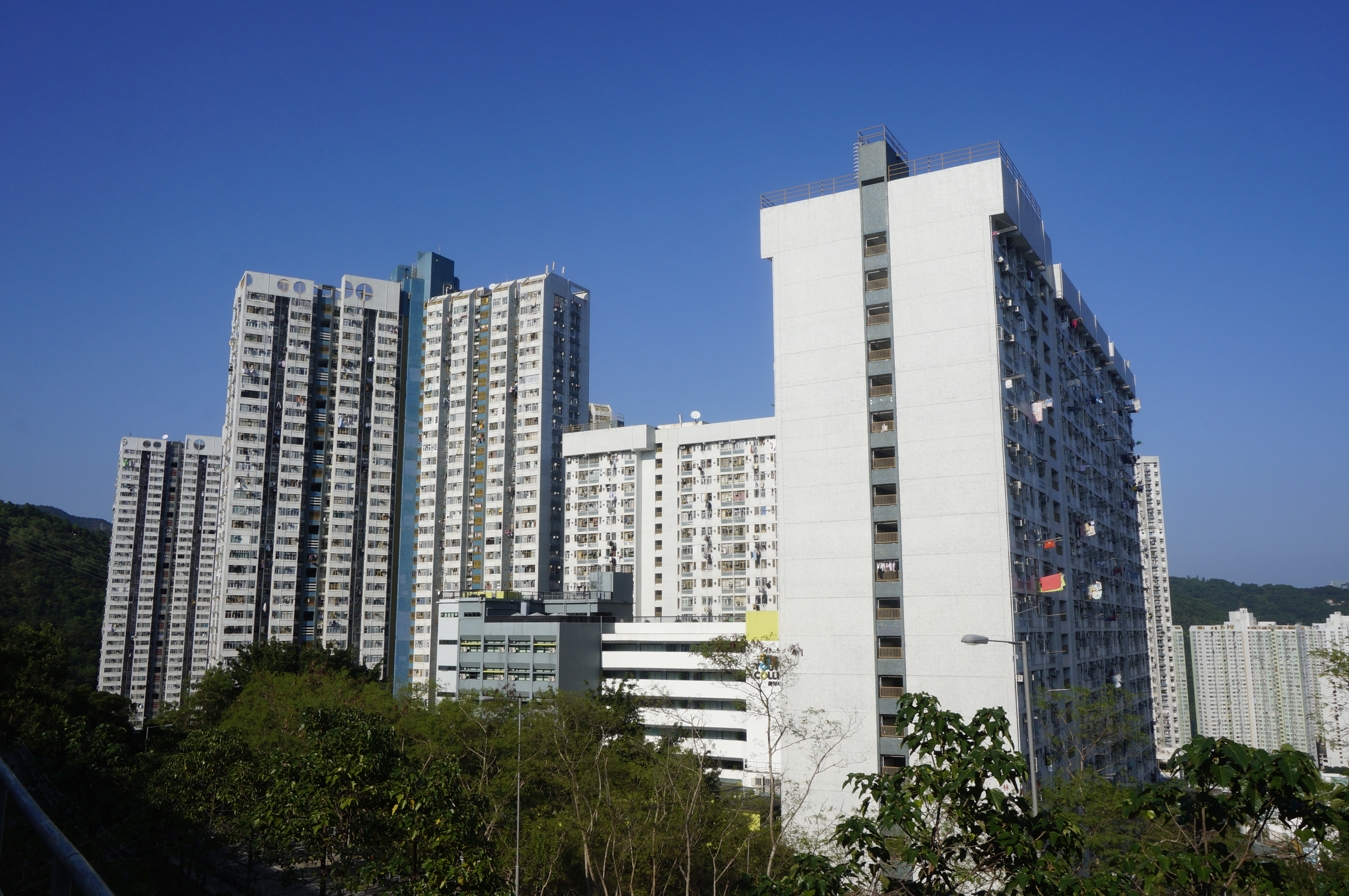
- Tsui Lam Estate
- Interactive map of Tsui Lam Estate

General information
- Location: 11 Tsui Lam Road, Tseung Kwan O New Territories, Hong Kong
- Coordinates: 22.3224485°N 114.2482455°E
- Status: Completed
- Category: Public rental housing
- Population: 14,897 (2016)
- No. of blocks: 8
- No. of units: 2,839

Construction
- Constructed: 1988; 38 years ago
- Authority: Hong Kong Housing Authority

Tsui Lam Estate (Chinese: 翠林邨) is a mixed TPS and public housing estate located to the west of Po Lam in Tseung Kwan O, New Territories, Hong Kong. It is the second public housing estate in Tseung Kwan O and is the only public housing estate in Tseung Kwan O not built on reclaimed land. It has a total of eight residential blocks completed in 1988. Some of the flats were sold to tenants through Tenants Purchase Scheme Phase 6B in 2005.

King Ming Court (景明苑) is a Home Ownership Scheme housing court in Tseung Kwan O near Tsui Lam Estate. It has three residential blocks built in 1988 and is the only HOS court in Tseung Kwan O built at a hill, but not on reclaimed land.

== Houses ==
=== Tsui Lam Estate ===
Name	Chinese name	Building type	Completed
Choi Lam House	彩林樓	New Slab	1988
Fai Lam House	輝林樓	New Slab	1988
Nga Lam House	雅林樓	New Slab	1988
Yan Lam House	欣林樓	New Slab	1988
Pik Lam House	碧林樓	Trident 2	1988
Sau Lam House	秀林樓	Trident 2	1988
Hong Lam House	康林樓	Trident 2	1988
On Lam House	安林樓	Trident 2	1988

=== King Ming Court ===
Name	Chinese name	Building type	Completed
Hei King House	曦景閣	New Cruciform (Ver.1984)	1988
Fai King House	暉景閣	New Cruciform (Ver.1984)	1988
Yuk King House	旭景閣	New Cruciform (Ver.1984)	1988

== Demographics ==
According to the 2016 by-census, Tsui Lam Estate had a population of 14,897. The median age was 50.9 and the majority of residents (97.9 per cent) were of Chinese ethnicity. The average household size was 3 people. The median monthly household income of all households (i.e. including both economically active and inactive households) was HK$26,900.

== Politics ==
For the 2019 District Council election, the estate fell within two constituencies. Tsui Lam Estate falls within the Tsui Lam constituency, which is currently represented by Daryl Choi Ming-hei, while King Ming Court falls within the Hong King constituency, which was formerly represented by Frankie Lam Siu-chung until July 2021.

== See also ==
- Public housing estates in Tseung Kwan O
