= Mark Blocks =

Early form of public housing block

Mark Blocks are an early type of public housing in Hong Kong that preceded the designs of modern public housing blocks. There are seven types of Mark blocks. It improved by each design, from Mark I as H-shaped to Mark VII as a slab block. Early blocks have small units. The height may vary by type. The conditions are poor. Early blocks have no bathroom and kitchen, making it uninhabitable by modern standards. Later designs incorporated a kitchen and a bathroom.

== Mark I ==
Mark I blocks are the earliest resettlement blocks in Hong Kong. It is H-shaped and is usually 5-7 stories tall and has no elevators. Most are found in New Kowloon and the unit sizes are only 10-20 sq². Schools are usually held on the roofs of blocks.

List of blocks
Name	Number (Block Number)	Completion	Destroyed
Shek Kip Mei Estate	3-13	1954	1975
Tai Hang Tung Estate	3-13	1955	1983
Lei Cheng Uk Estate	1, 2, and 10	1955	1980
Lei Cheng Uk Estate	12	1955	1982
Lei Cheng Uk Estate	3-9, 13-19	1955	1985
Tsui Ping Estate	14	1955-1958	1982
Tsui Ping Estate	12, 13, 15, 16	1955-1958	1985
Tsui Ping Estate	2-6, 17-19	1955-1958	1986
Tsui Ping Estate	24	1955-1958	1989
Tsui Ping Estate	7-11	1955-1958	1990
Tsui Ping Estate	1, 21-23	1955-1958	1991
Lok Fu Estate	1-12	1957	1991-1992
Lower Wong Tai Sin Estate	6, 7, 9-14	1957	1977
Lower Wong Tai Sin Estate	3, 4, 5	1957	1987
Lower Wong Tai Sin Estate	1, 2, 20-25	1958	1987
Lower Wong Tai Sin Estate	16, 17	1958	1989
Lower Wong Tai Sin Estate	15, 18, 19	1958	1991
Lower Wong Tai Sin Estate	8（One block）	1958	1996
Chai Wan Estate	17, 18, 20	1957-1959	1982
Jordan Valley Estate	1, 2, 6-8, 10-16	1959-1960	1991

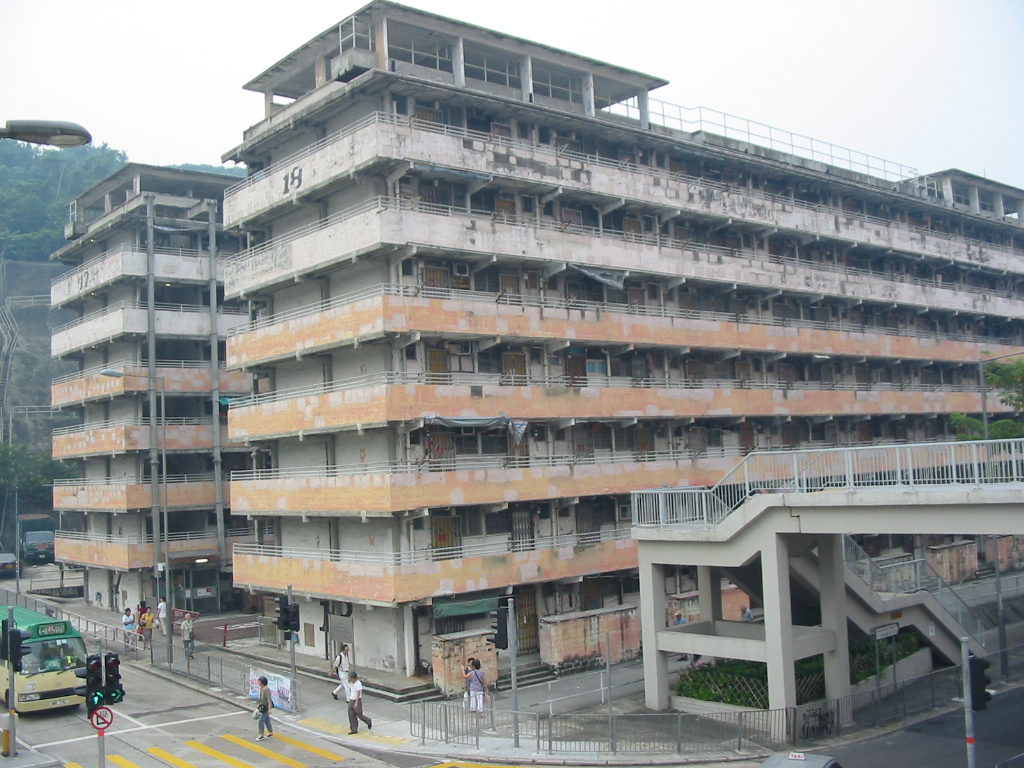
Shek Kip Mei Estate

=== Modified Mark I ===
Modified blocks are converted Mark I blocks in the 1970s. The unit area was improved. The units still neither has bathrooms and kitchens. In the 1980s, these units finally have bathrooms and kitchens. Some of the blocks have two wings. It has an interruption to separate the blocks (for example Blocks 15 to 18 and Blocks 25 to 40 in Shek Kip Mei Estate). One of them had to be demolished, like in the case of Block 22 in Chai Wan Estate. The blocks undergo major renaming schemes, like in the case of Block 41 of Shek Kip Mei Estate, which became Mei Ho House.

Due to Kai Tak Airport being closed, the demand for land greatly increased. Due to Mark blocks being 'land wasters', the blocks are demolished between 1991-2008 and new blocks are built in its place. Block 41 is the only block standing of its kind.

List of blocks
Name	Number (Block Number)	Completion	Destroyed
Shek Kip Mei Estate	10-13, 35, 36, 38	1954	2000-2001
Shek Kip Mei Estate	15-18, 25-40	1954	2008
Shek Kip Mei Estate	41（Mei Ho House）	1954	（Still standing）
Shek Kip Mei Estate	8, 9	1956	2000-2001
Tai Hang Tung Estate	A	1955	2003
Tai Hang Tung Estate	0	1955	2003
Tai Hang Tung Estate	1	1955	2003
Tai Hang Tung Estate	2	1955	2003
Hung Hom Estate	1, 2	1956	2000
Hung Hom Estate	3, 4	1956	1995
Chai Wan Estate	22	1958	1996
Jordan Valley Estate	3, 4, 5	1959-1960	1996
Jordan Valley Estate	9	1959-1960	1991

=== Semi-Modified Mark I ===
This type is very rare in Hong Kong. They were only built from the 1980s to the 1990s. It is similar to Mark I. It can only be found in Tai Hang Tung Estate.

== Mark II ==
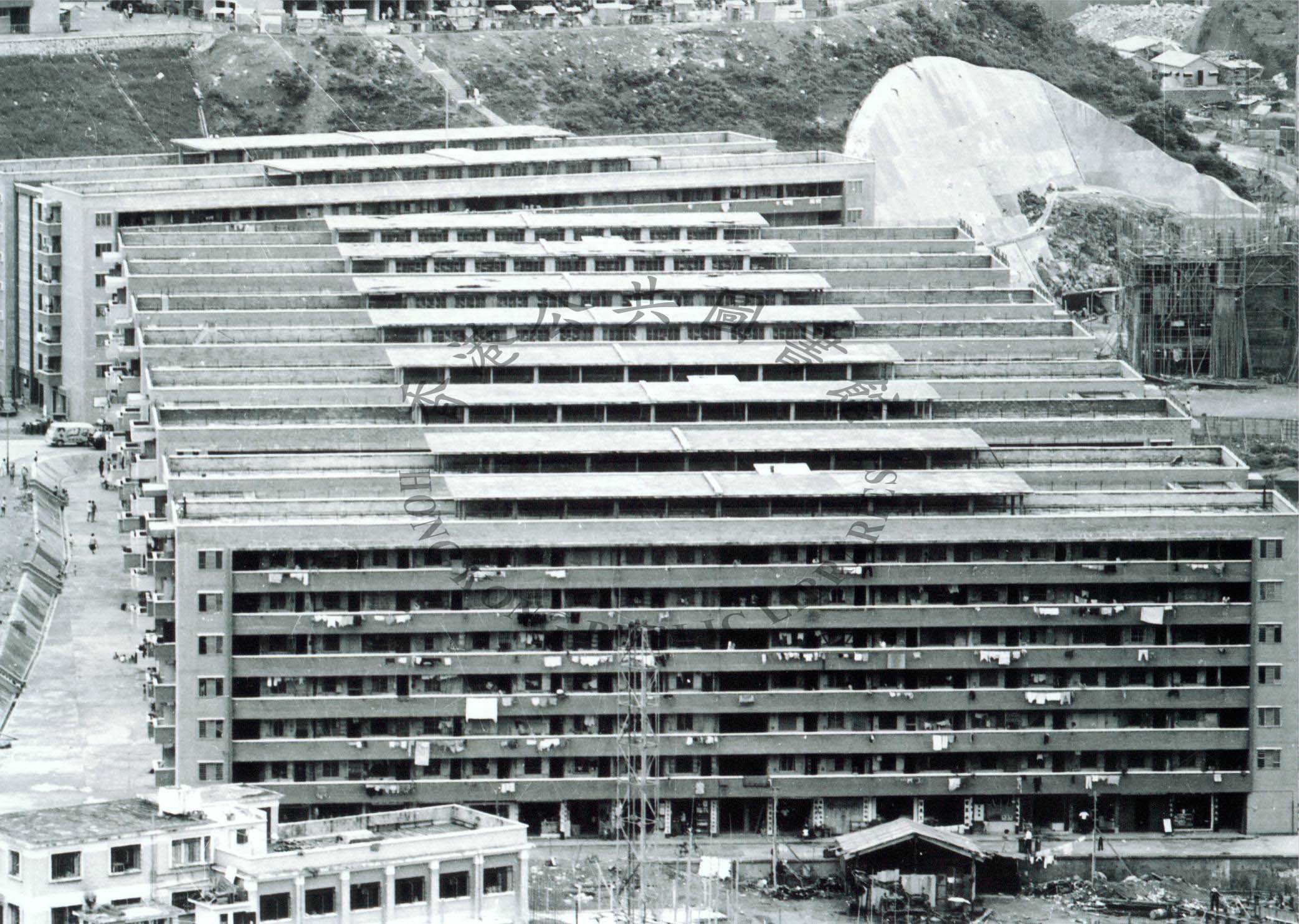
Tai Wo Hau Estate

Mark II blocks appeared as early from 1959. It is mainly found in New Kowloon, Tsuen Wan, and Kwai Chung. It has the same characteristics as Mark I, with 5-7 stories, no elevator, no independent toilets and kitchens, & public toilets and bathrooms (in the middle of the block) connecting the two wings. The difference between those two is that it has three ladders than its previous counterpart. Another difference is that the four corner has large units. These units have a kitchen and toilet located inside the unit.

Only the Shek Kip Mei Estate (Block 14), Tung Tau Estate (Blocks 9 and 11) are single-story blocks.

Mark II blocks are destroyed as early as 1975. Block 21 of Lok Fu Estate is the last block to be demolished, in 1996. The design is the first to disappear completely.

== See also ==
- Types of public housing estate blocks in Hong Kong
- Rooftop schools
- Matchbox schools
- Old Slab
- Resettlement Area
