= Mei Ho House =

Building in Hong Kong

Mei Ho House 美荷樓
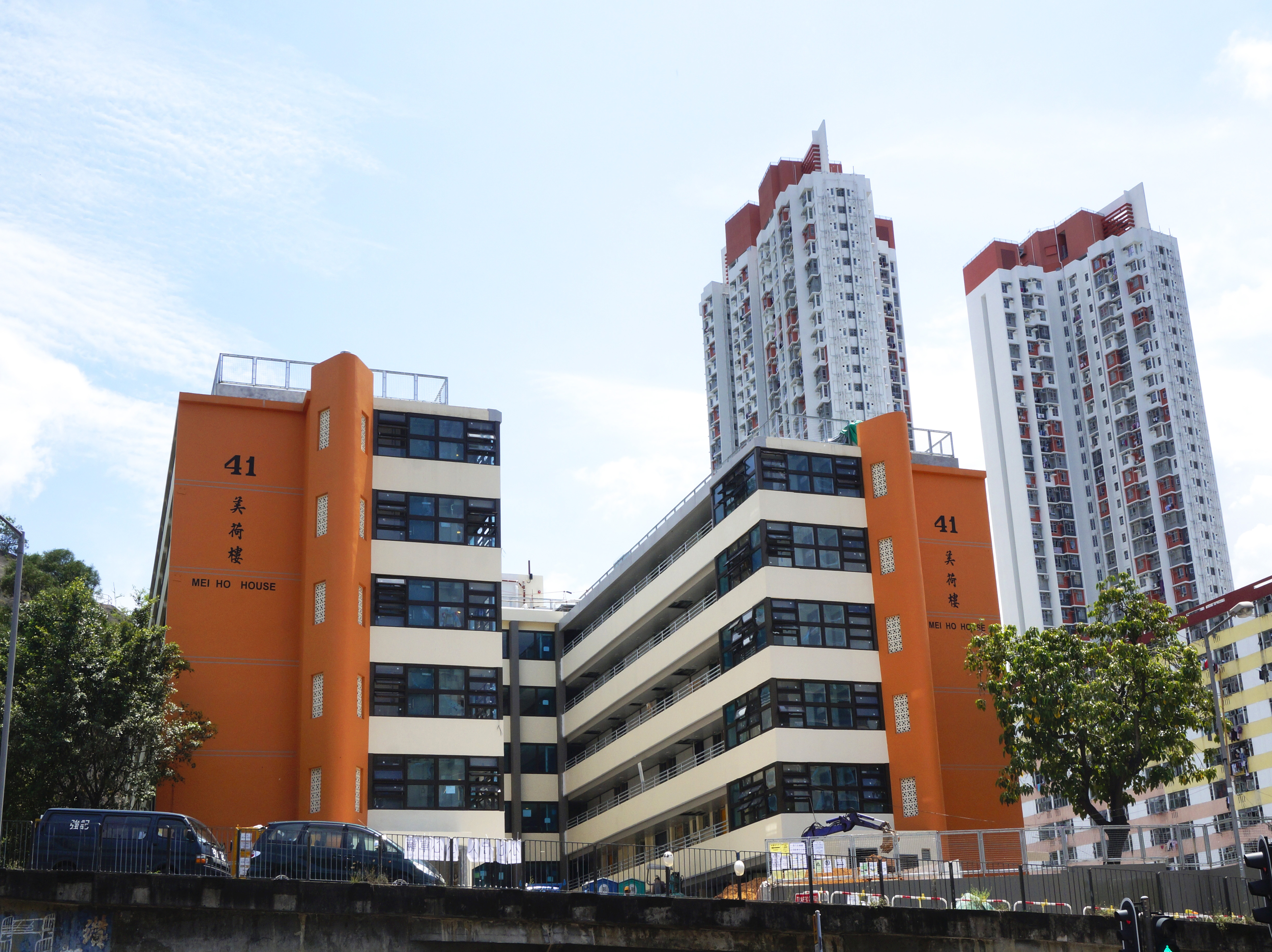
- Mei Ho House in 2013, after renovation
- Interactive map of the Mei Ho House 美荷樓 area

General information
- Location: Shek Kip Mei Estate, Sham Shui Po, Hong Kong
- Coordinates: 22.33395°N 114.163705°E
- Opening: 24 October 2013; 12 years ago
- Management: Hong Kong Youth Hostels Association
- Affiliation: Hostelling International

Other information
- Number of rooms: 129
- Number of restaurants: 1
- Parking: No

Website
- www.yha.org.hk/en/hostel/yha-mei-ho-house-youth-hostel/

Mei Ho House
- Traditional Chinese: 美荷樓
- Simplified Chinese: 美荷楼
- Cantonese Yale: méih hòh làuh
- Literal meaning: beautiful lotus building
Transcriptions
Standard Mandarin
- Hanyu Pinyin: Měihé Lóu
Yue: Cantonese
- Yale Romanization: méih hòh làuh
- Jyutping: mei5 ho4 lau4

Mei Ho House (Chinese: 美荷樓), formerly part of Shek Kip Mei Estate, Hong Kong, is the last remaining example of a "Mark I" building in a single-block configuration. While the other buildings of the estate dating from the 1950s have been demolished, being replaced by new ones, Mei Ho House was chosen to be preserved and was reopened in 2013 as a youth hostel and heritage museum.

== History ==
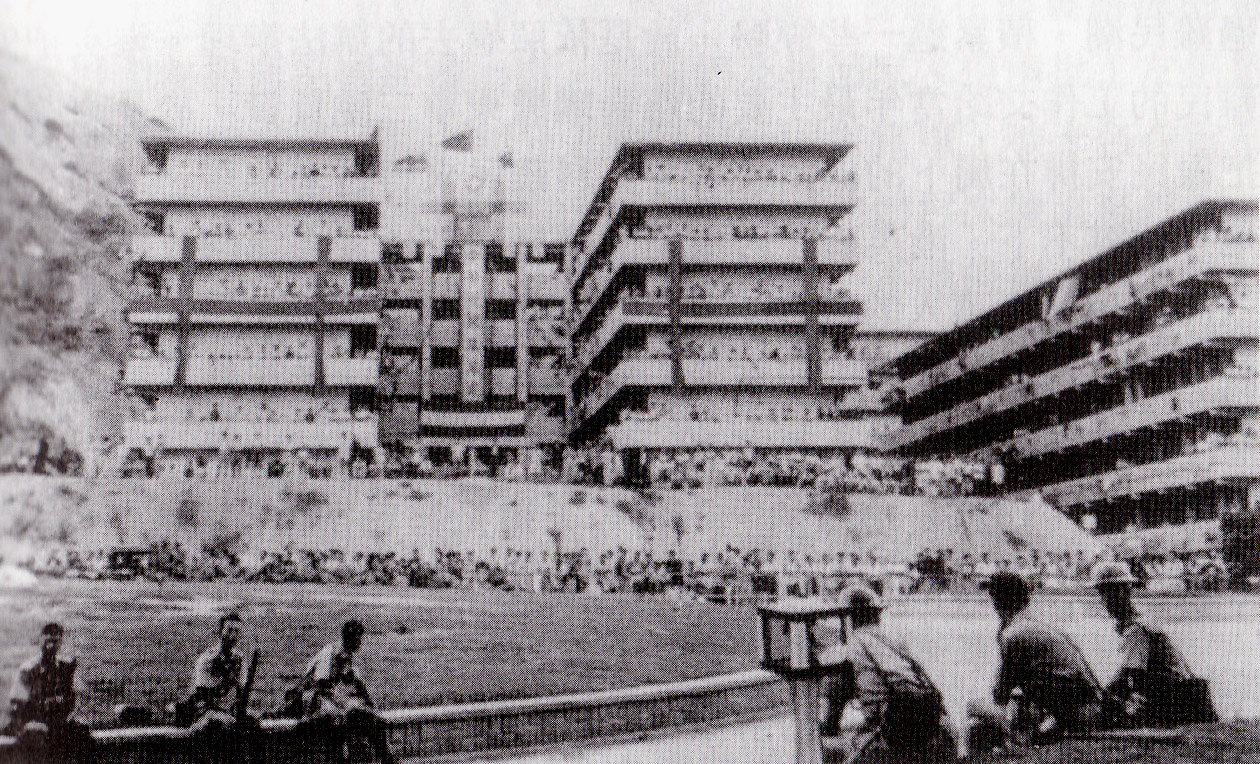
Mei Ho during the 1956 riots. A banner can be clearly seen hanging from the building.

After a devastating fire in December 1953 that left thousands homeless, the colonial government built a 29-block resettlement estate on the site of the burnt-down shanties to house the homeless victims. Eight blocks (Blocks A to H), later renumbered as Blocks 10 through 13 and 35 through to 41, were constructed with the financial aid of the United Nations (Mei Ho House is Block H, later Block 41). These 7-storey blocks were constructed in the Bauhaus architectural style with an 'H' configuration consisting of 2 residential wings, with communal sanitary facilities linking them.

During the Hong Kong 1956 riots, the building was used as one of the bases for the rioters.

== Preservation ==
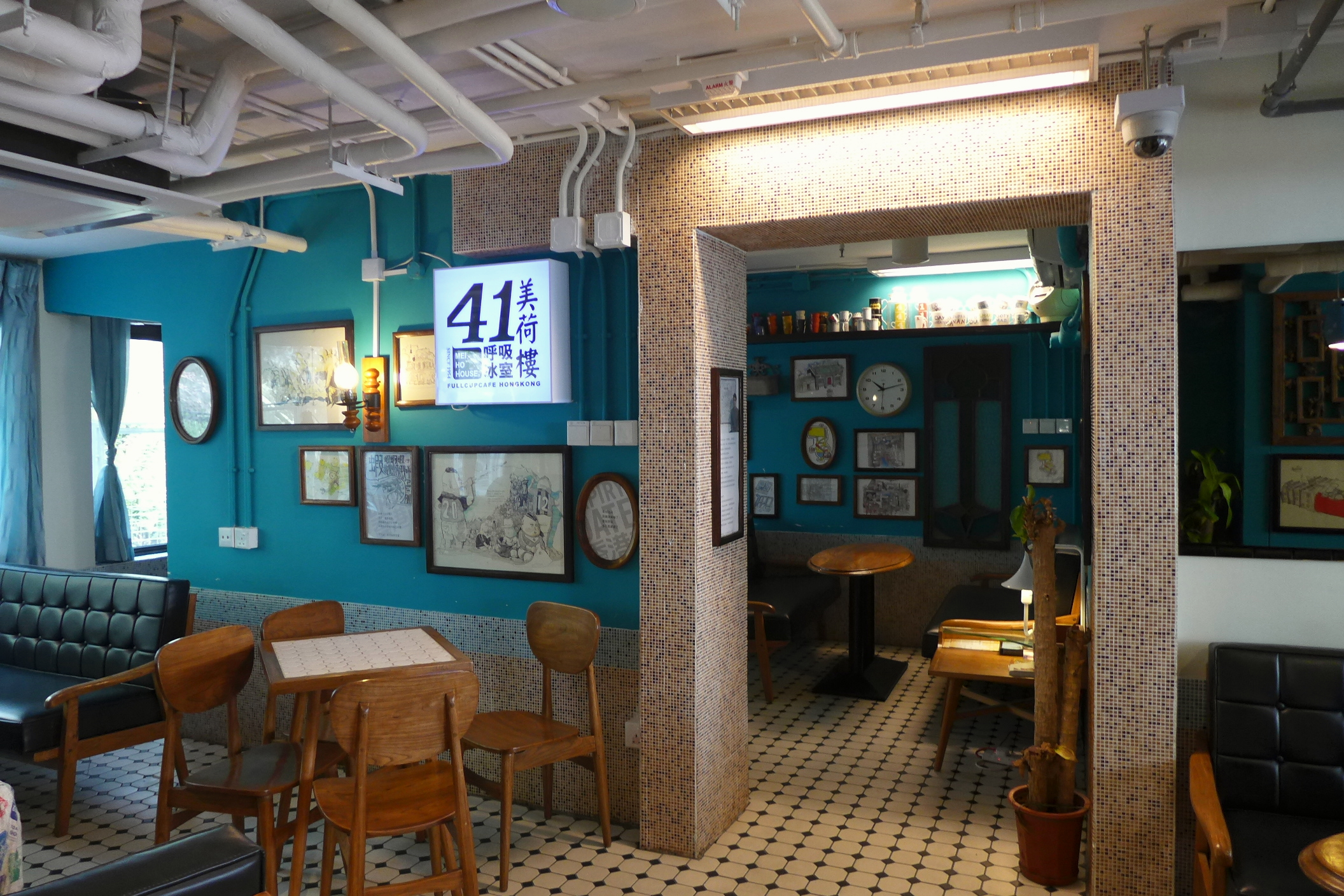
Fullcup Cafe after revitalization in 2013

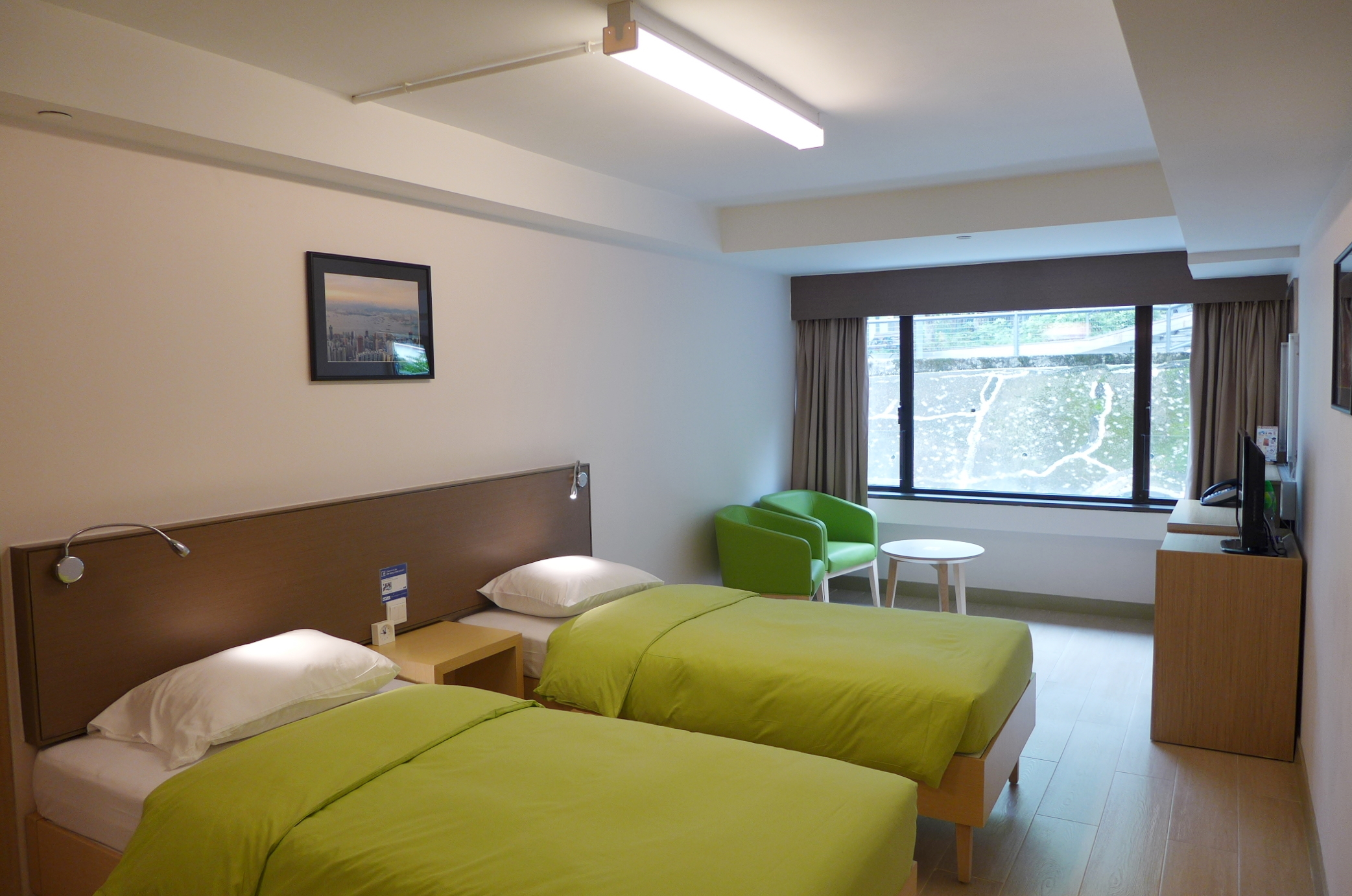
The hostel inside Mei Ho House

The building has been preserved as a record of Hong Kong's public housing development. It was listed as a Grade I historic building in 2005 and as a Grade II historic building in 2010.

In 2008, it was part of the seven buildings of Batch I of the Hong Kong Government's Revitalising Historic Buildings Through Partnership Scheme. On 17 February 2009, the government declared that the building would be used by the Hong Kong Youth Hostels Association as "City Hostel". The capital cost of the project was estimated at HK$192.3 million. Estimated completion time was 2012. The hostel would also have an exhibition area with guided tour detailing the living environment of public housing units in the past.

The renovation project received an Honourable Mention in the UNESCO Asia-Pacific Awards for Cultural Heritage Conservation in 2015.

== Youth Hostel ==
Mei Ho House Youth Hostel was open for business from 24 October 2013. A double room costs from HK$680 per night while a family room costs from HK$1,320. At the opening, Chief Secretary for Administration Carrie Lam described it as a "pioneering renovation project" for a public housing estate and "very meaningful."

== Gallery ==
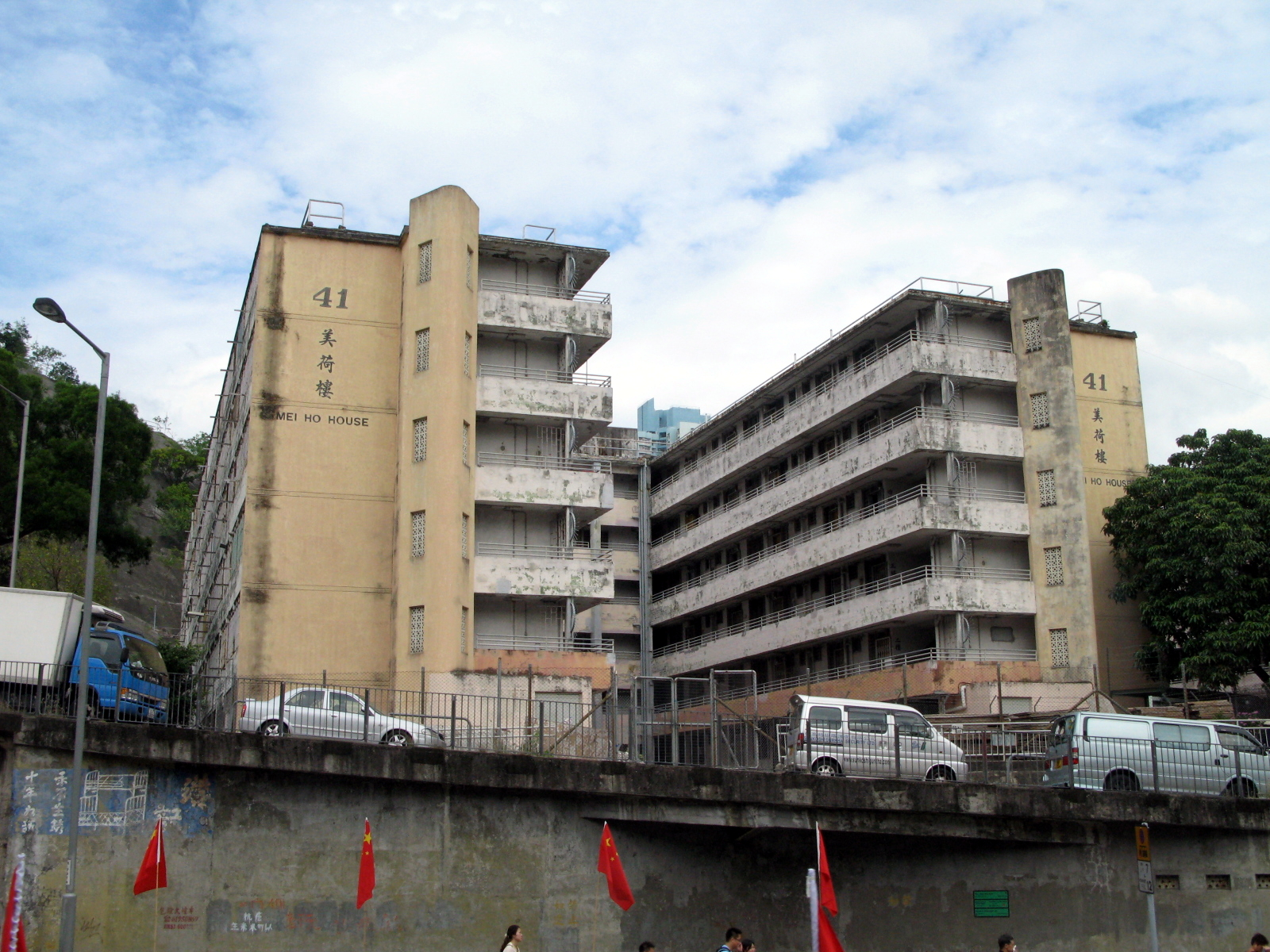
Mei Ho House in 2007

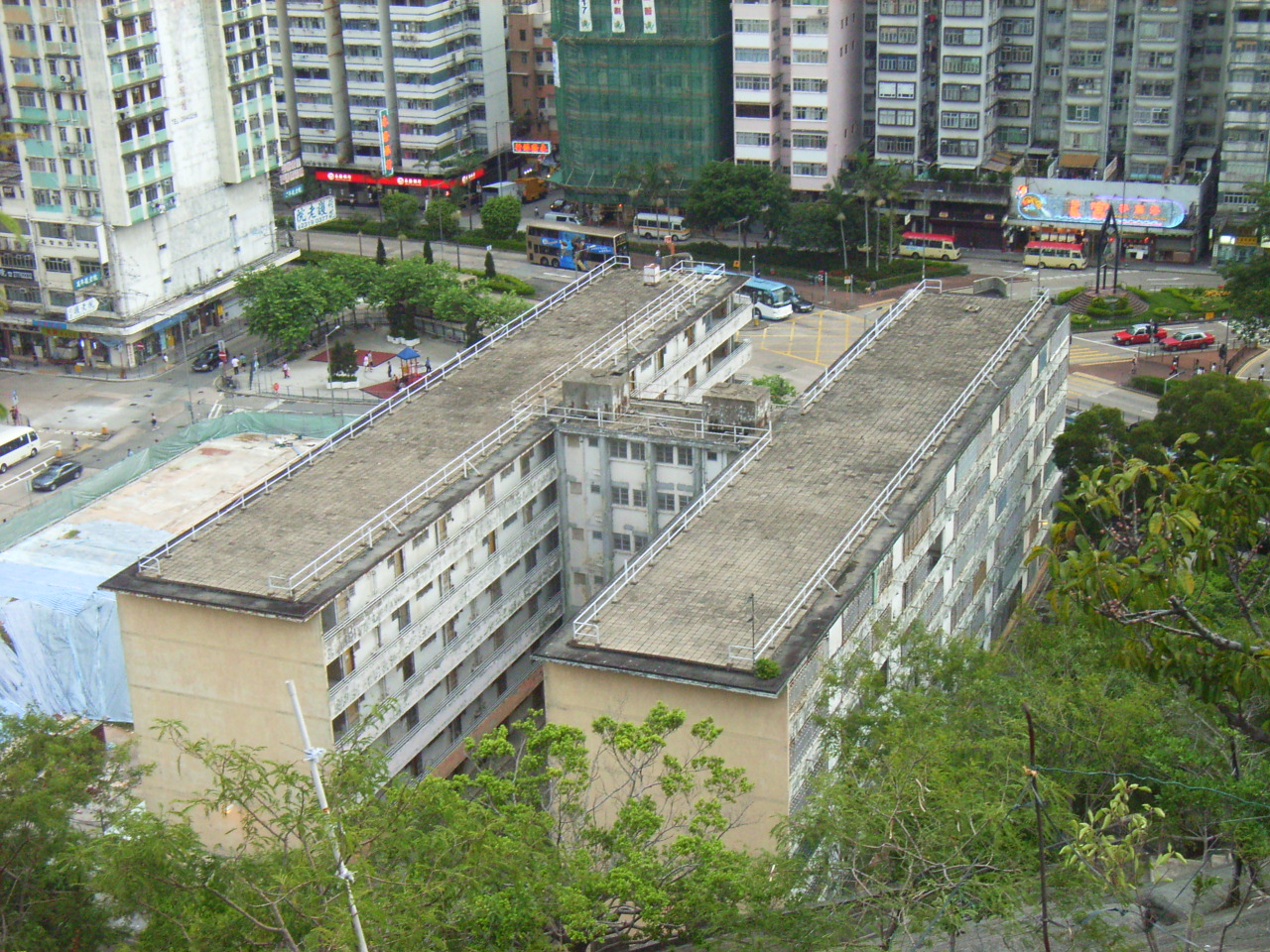
Mei Ho House in 2009

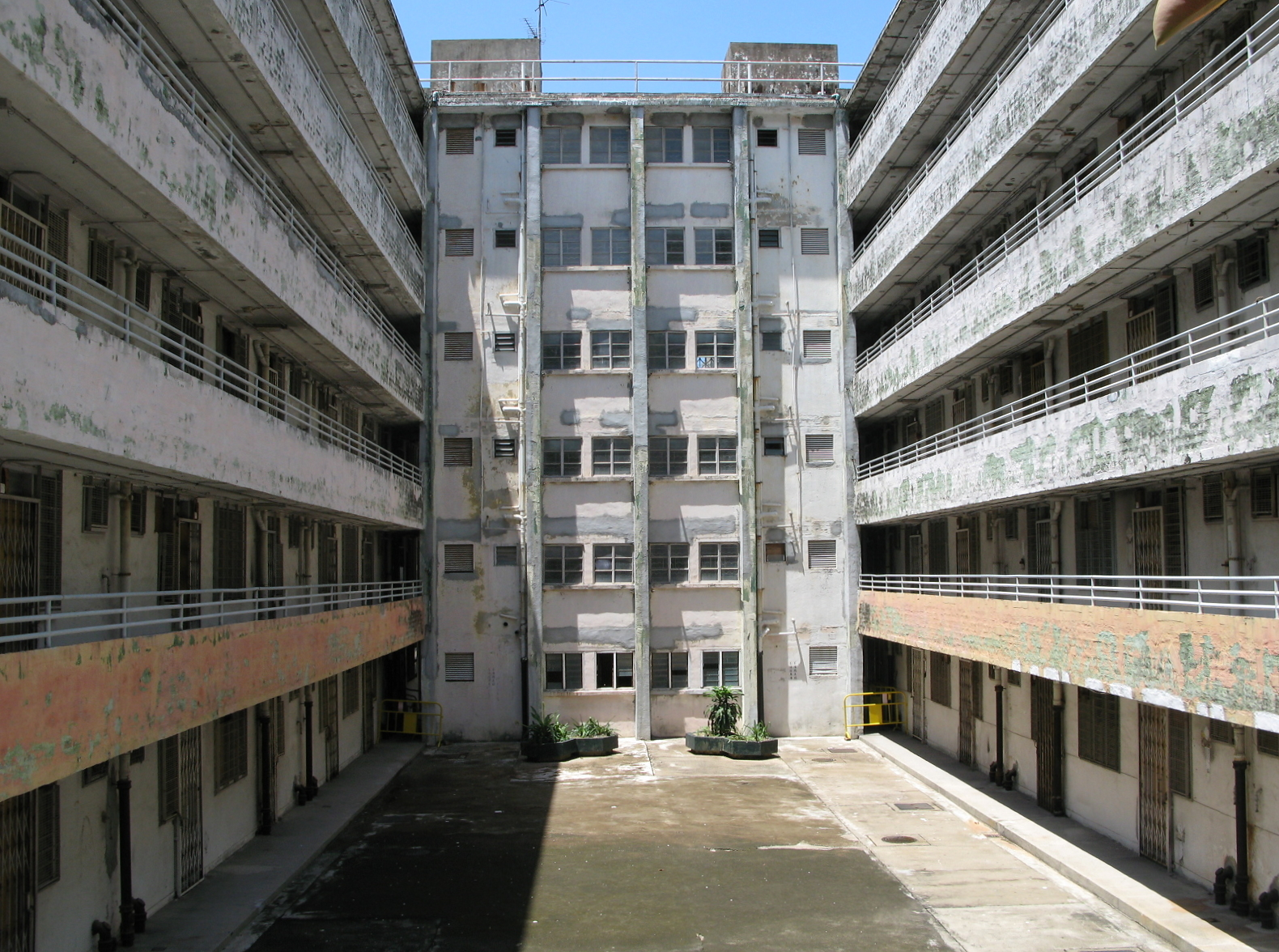
2009

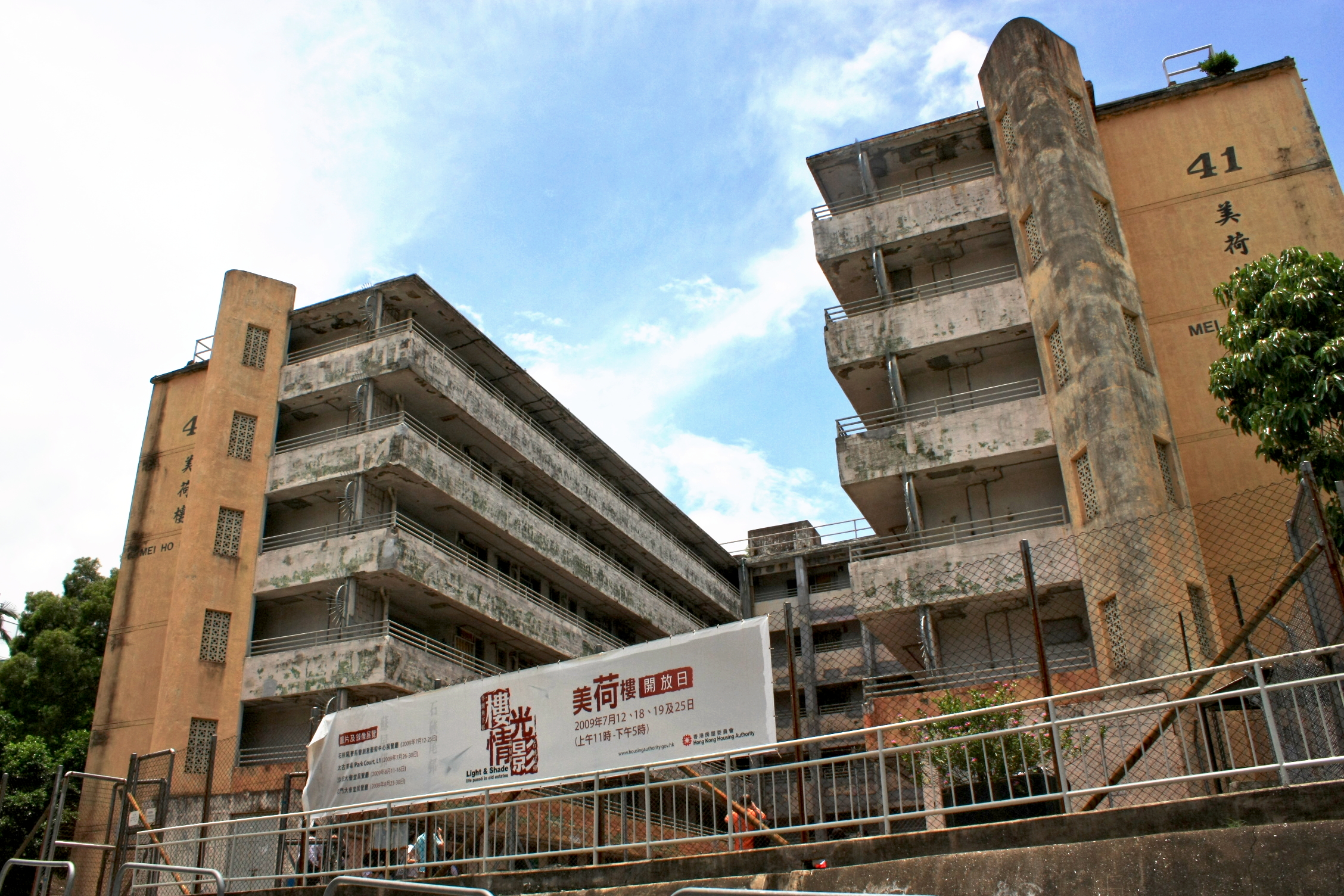
2009

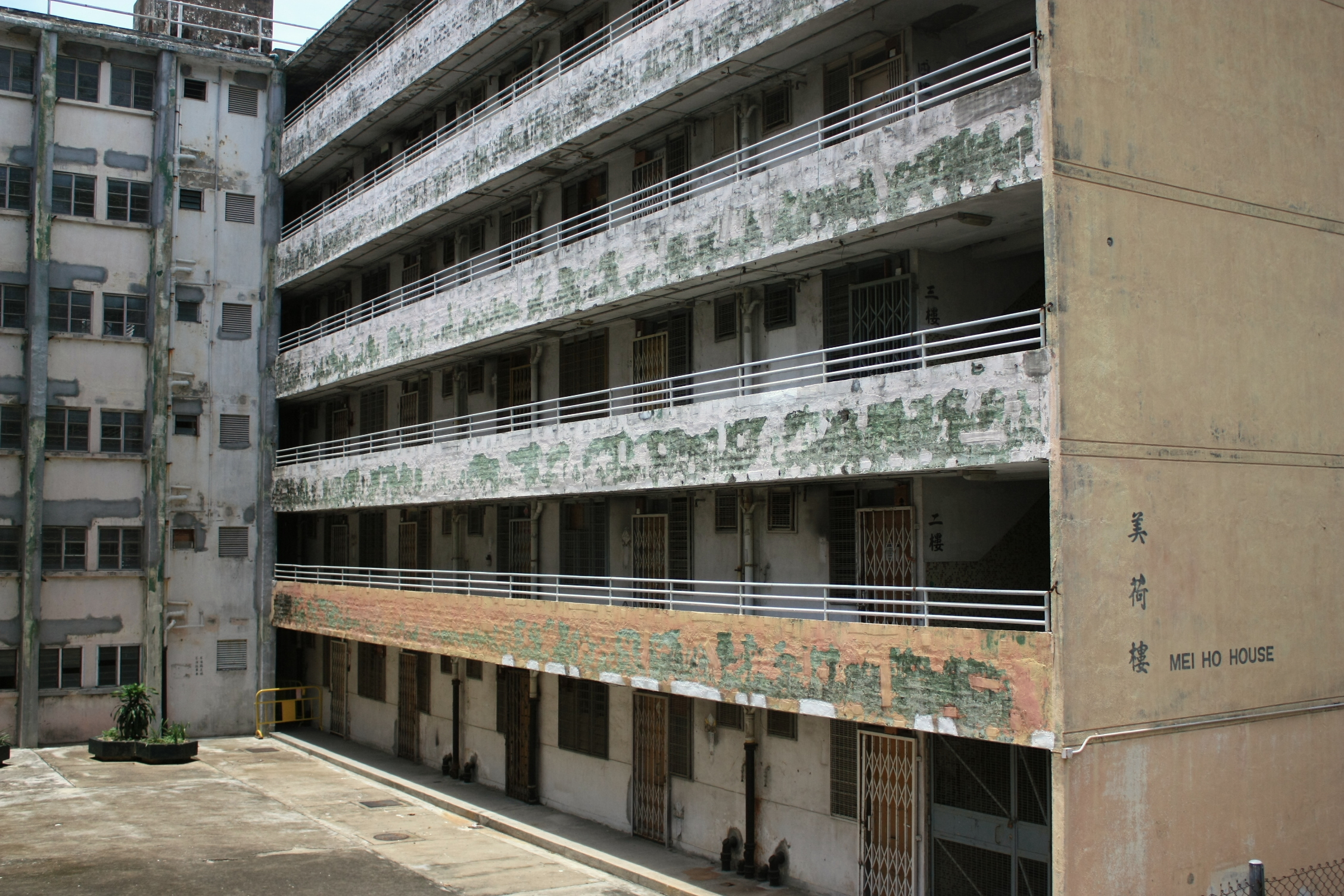
2009

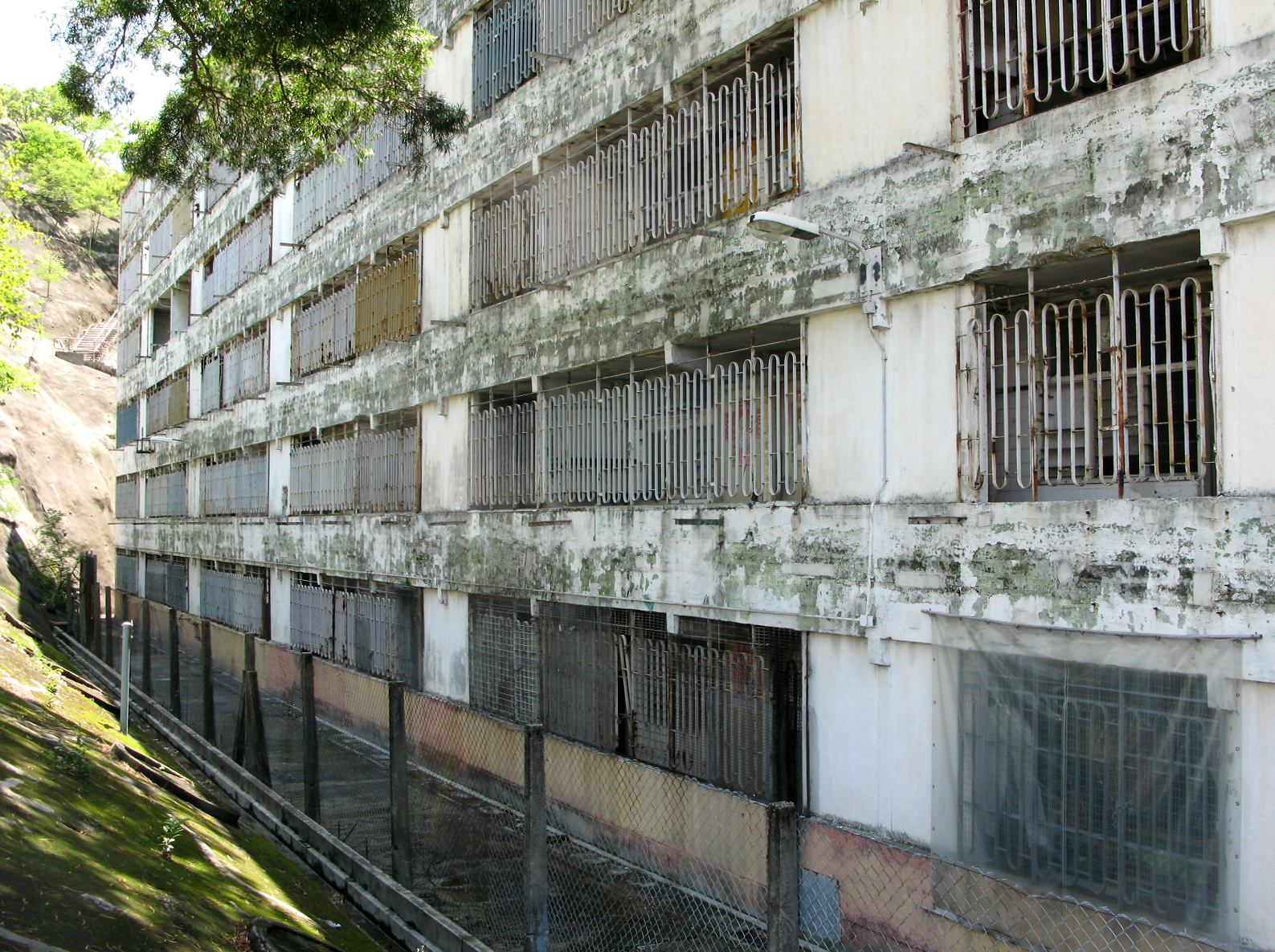
2009

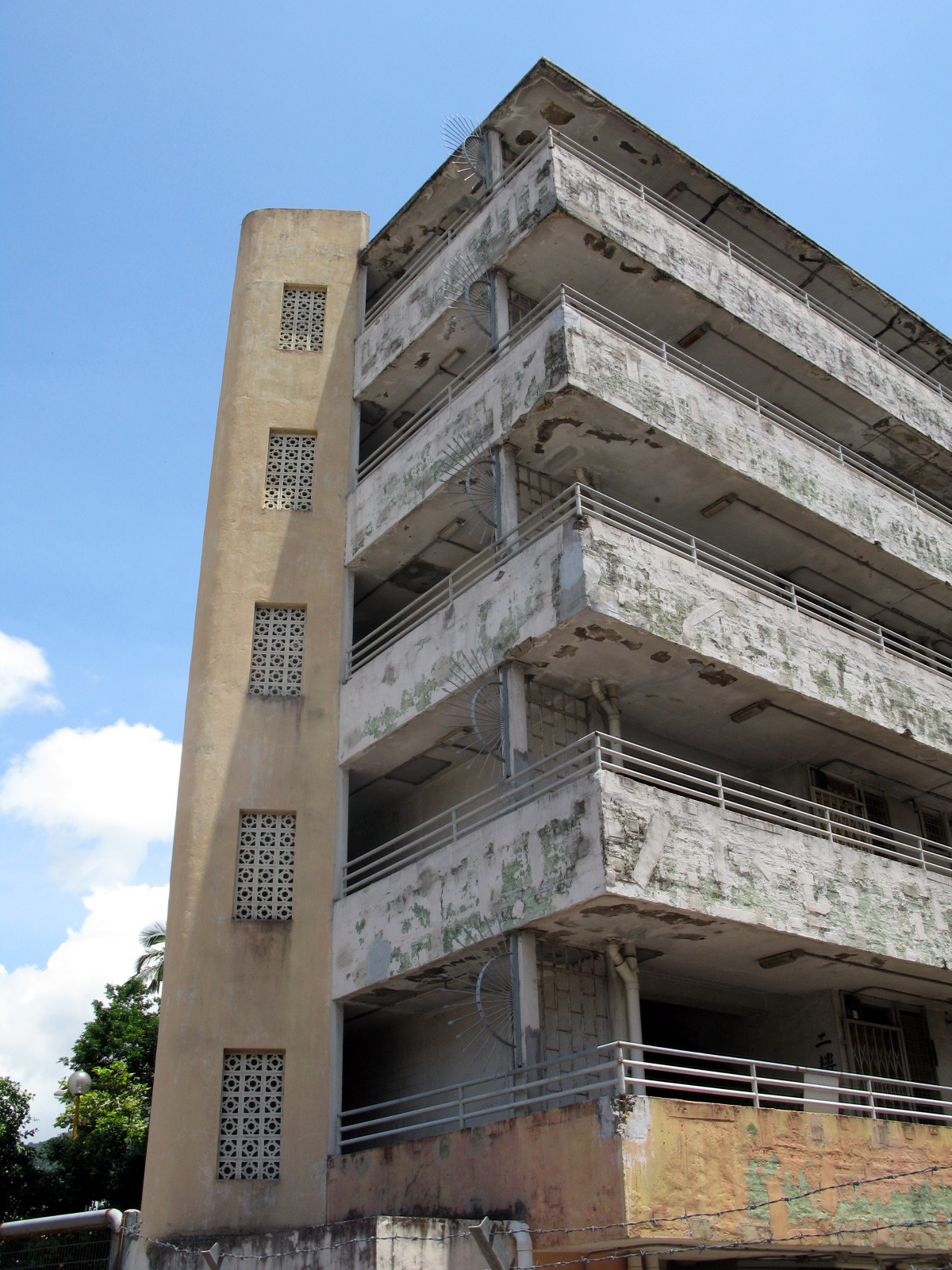
2009

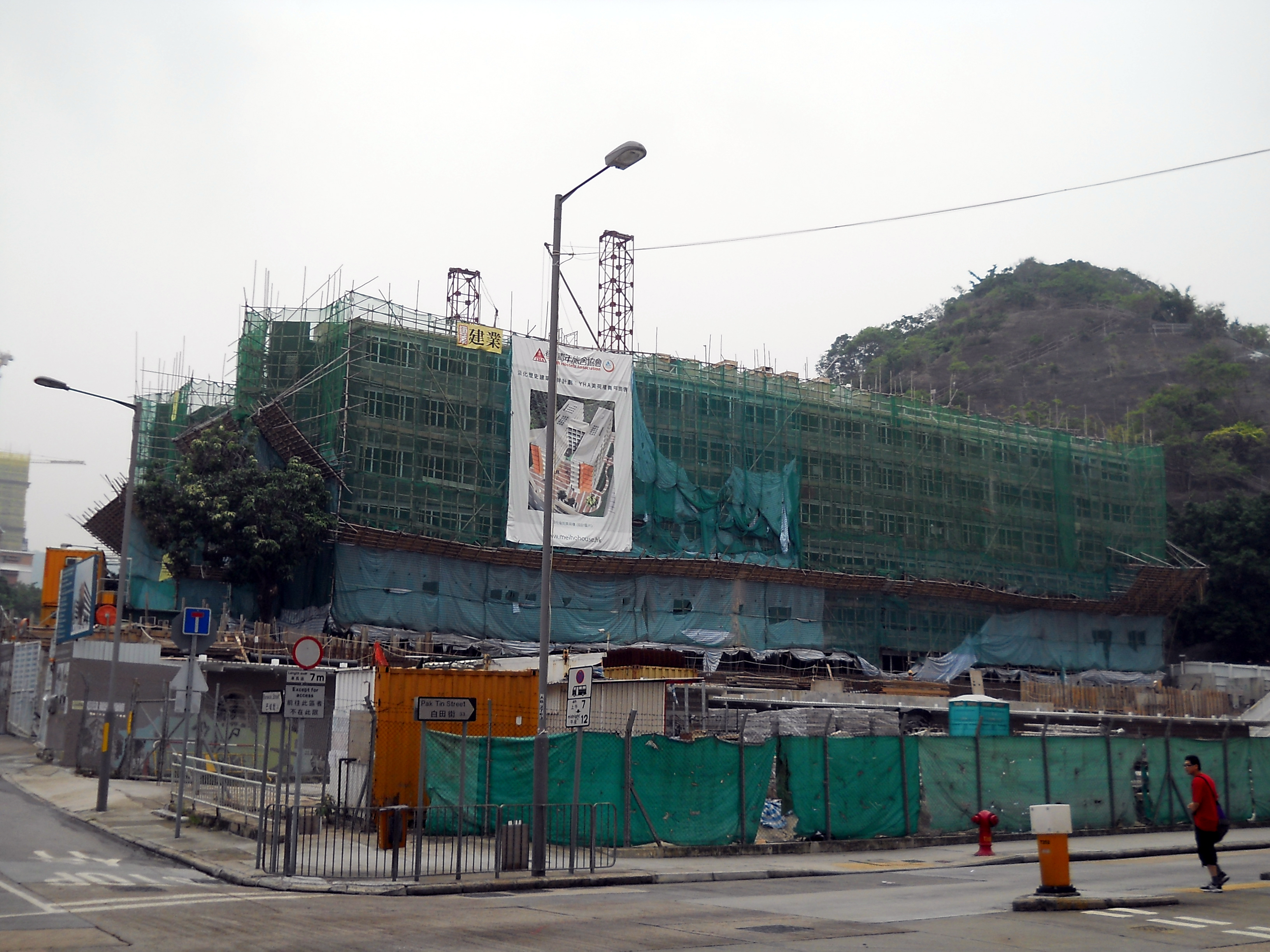
Undergoing renovation in 2012

== See also ==
- North Kowloon Magistracy, adaptive reuse of a nearby historical building
