= Resettlement area =

Early form of public housing in Hong Kong

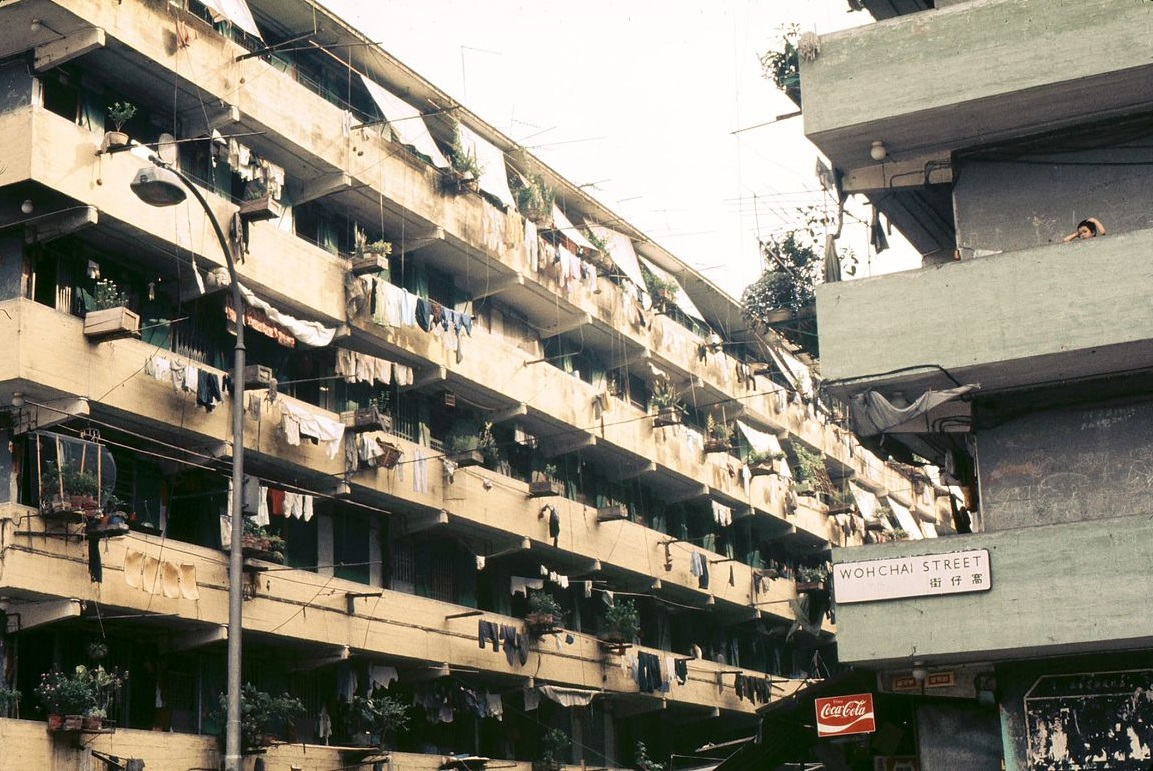
Shek Kip Mei Estate

Resettlement Areas, or Resettlement Estates (Chinese: 徙置區) are an early form of public housing in Hong Kong. They were built between 1954 and 1975. The designs used are Mark I to Mark VII. Most are found in the new towns of Hong Kong (Kwun Tong, Kwai Chung, Tsuen Wan, Tuen Mun, and Yuen Long). It was managed by the Resettlement Department. In 1973, it was organized into Hong Kong Housing Authority. Then, resettlement areas began to be referred as 'estates'. It was classified as 'Category B Public Housing Estates'. Newer housing projects are called 'Category A Public Housing Estates'. Today, only Mei Ho House remains standing as a Mark I block.

== History ==
It began when a fire destroyed Shek Kip Mei in 1953. The government built two-story bungalows to accommodate the fire victims. It would later become Shek Kip Mei Estate.

The blocks would later evolve into Mark blocks and would be known as Multi-Story Housing. The name for these estates at the time would be called "old or new". The areas would later redevelop and rebuilt multiple times in the later years. An example of this is Kwai Chung Estate.

== Early estates ==
The Resettlement Department has 25 such estates located all over Hong Kong. The estates contained seven types of blocks, ranging from Mark I to Mark VII, in which it began to be considered to be a slab block. Six of them were managed by the former agency, and the seventh one would later be managed by the Hong Kong Housing Authority. Mark I and Mark II blocks are only seven stories tall, which were short by today's standards. The first two blocks are also H-shaped. Some blocks are named with English wording. Usually, the naming scheme has only 25 letters in the alphabet, since I is omitted due to it having confusion with the number 1. For example, the scheme goes from the first to the next, and when all the letters are used, it restarts all over again, like AA and BB.

Mei Ho House is the only Mark I or Mark II block standing.

== Mark Blocks ==
Mark Blocks are an early type of public housing that preceded the designs of modern public housing blocks. There are seven types of Mark blocks. It improved by each design, from Mark I as H-shaped to Mark VII as a slab block. Early blocks have small units. The height may vary by type. The conditions are poor. Early blocks have no bathroom and kitchen, making it unhabitable by modern standards. Later designs incorporated a kitchen and a bathroom.

== Today ==
Three of the types of resettlement blocks (from Mark I to Mark VI) have yet to be demolished. The types are:

- Mei Ho House (Block 41 of Shek Kip Mei Estate): One of the first ever blocks. It has been preserved. It is now a youth hostel.
- Blocks 10 & 11 of Shek Lei Estate: Currently used as interim housing. Both blocks will be demolished in December 2022. It would be completed by 2028 and 2,800 new units would be built. The school will be rebuilt by mid-2022.
