= Shek Kip Mei Estate =

Housing estate in Sham Shui Po, Hong Kong

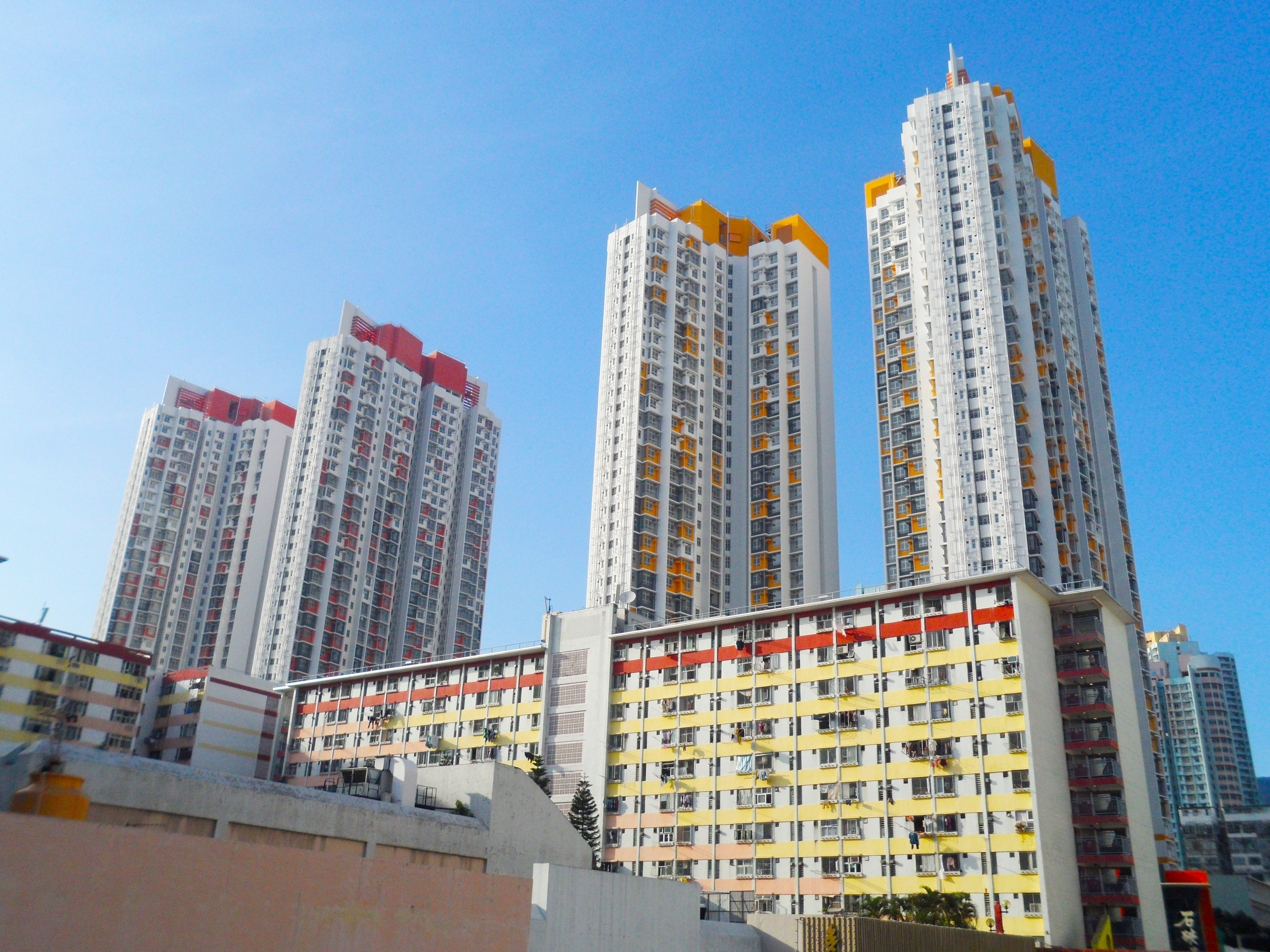
- Interactive map of Shek Kip Mei Estate

General information
- Location: Sham Shui Po, Kowloon; Hong Kong
- Coordinates: 22.3315°N 114.1671°E
- Status: Completed
- Category: Public rental housing
- No. of blocks: 21
- No. of units: 10,800

Construction
- Authority: Hong Kong Housing Authority

Shek Kip Mei Estate
- Traditional Chinese: 石硤尾邨
- Simplified Chinese: 石硖尾邨
- Cantonese Yale: Sehk gip méih chyūn
Transcriptions
Standard Mandarin
- Hanyu Pinyin: Shíxiáwěi Cūn
Yue: Cantonese
- Yale Romanization: Sehk gip méih chyūn
- Jyutping: Sek6 gip3 mei5 cyun1

Shek Kip Mei Estate is the first public housing estate in Hong Kong. It is located in Sham Shui Po and is under the management of the Hong Kong Housing Authority. The estate was constructed as a result of a fire in Shek Kip Mei in 1953, to settle the families of inhabitants in the squats over the hill who lost their homes in one night.

Originally constructed in 1953 to alleviate the immediate housing needs, the units in this "Mark I" estate were utilitarian. Redevelopment of the estate commenced in 1972, with new towers coming on stream between 1979 and 1982. Site 1 of redevelopment was occupied in 2007.

The estate now consists of 21 residential blocks, containing 10,800 rental flats. The estate has an authorised capacity of 26,400.

== History ==
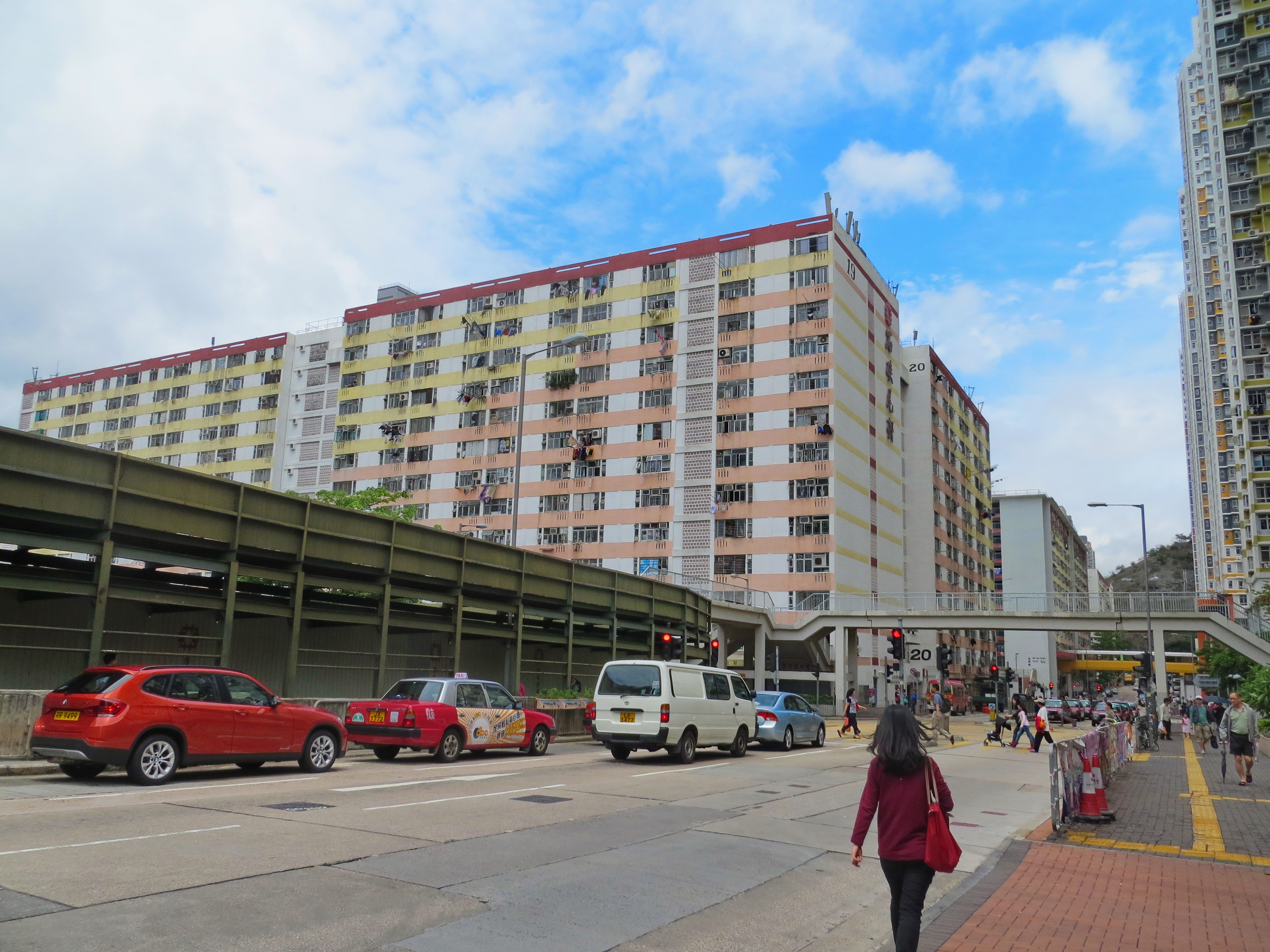
Shek Kip Mei Estate Block completed in 1977

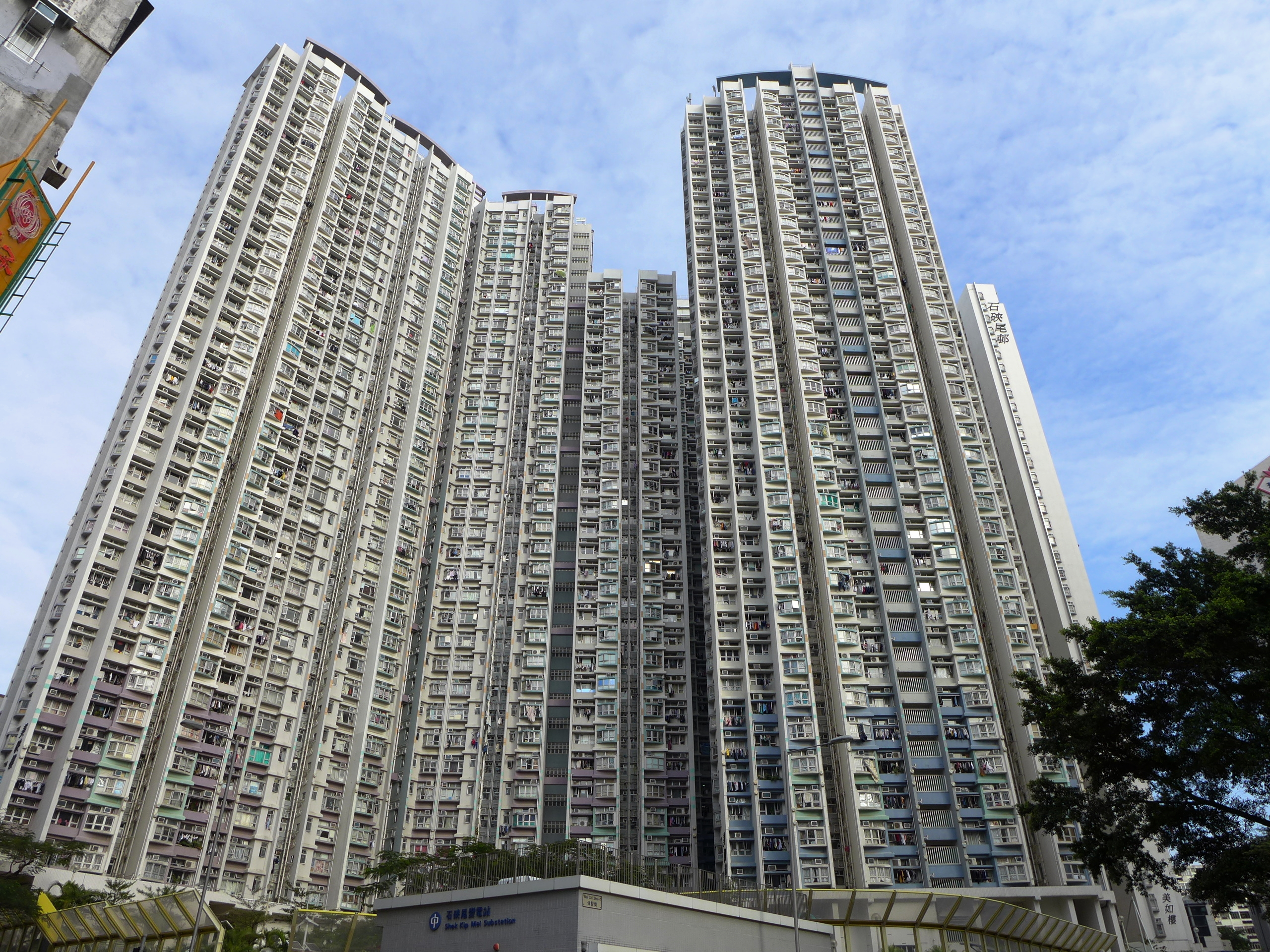
Shek Kip Mei Estate Mei Ying House & Mei Yue House were completed in 2007

Following the Second World War, a large number of migrants from the mainland arrived in Hong Kong. Due to the lack of housing policy, and thus non-availability of affordable housing, the migrants lived illegally in wooden shanties in a hillside ghetto in the Sham Shui Po area. Poor facilities, unsanitary conditions, and the high density of huts represented a serious safety hazard. On 24 December 1953, the ghetto caught fire. The blaze lasted for six hours and was put under control on 25 December, at around 2:30 am. It left an estimated 53,000 people without shelter.

Consequently, the Colonial government built a 29-block resettlement estate on the site of the burnt-down shanties to house the homeless victims. Eight blocks (Blocks A to H), now renumbered as Blocks 10 through 13 and 35 through 41, were constructed with the financial aid of the United Nations. These 7-storey blocks were constructed in an 'H' configuration consisting of two residential wings, with a central core of communal cooking and sanitary facilities. Residential units, which housed entire families, were roughly 100 square feet (9.3 m^{2}) in size. Later, towers were constructed in a single block configuration.

The massive fire gave birth formally to the public housing policy of the Government. In 1961, the subsidised rent policy was launched with the construction of 7 towers at the junction of Tai Hang Road West and Nam Cheong Street. The Shek Kip Mei Estate was subdivided into "Upper" and "Lower" estates, with the Upper estate being designated a "low-rent estate" (廉租屋邨), and the Lower estate designated a "Resettlement estate" (徙置屋邨). Occupation of these blocks commenced in 1963.

Housing units were little more than small cubicles, and the original plan was to allocate 24 square feet (2.2 m^{2}) per adult and half that for each child under 12. However, they were in reality often occupied by more than one family due to the extreme shortage of available housing. Facilities and sanitation were primitive, and communal.

Until the establishment of the Housing Authority in 1973, Hong Kong's public housing was administered by the Resettlement Department. By that time, eleven old blocks of the estate had been pulled down, and modernisation of 18 blocks of the resettlement estate had commenced. Phased re-occupation of the re-numbered estate took place between 1978 and 1984. The distinction between "Upper" and "Lower" estates was henceforth disregarded. Mei Yu House (美如樓) and Mei Ying House (美映樓), representing the latest phase, were built on the location of Blocks 1 to 7 (the resettlement estate), and were mostly occupied on 18 July 2006.

All remaining 1950s blocks were demolished since 20 June 2007, excluding Block 41, which is reserved for further revitalisation.

== Conservation ==
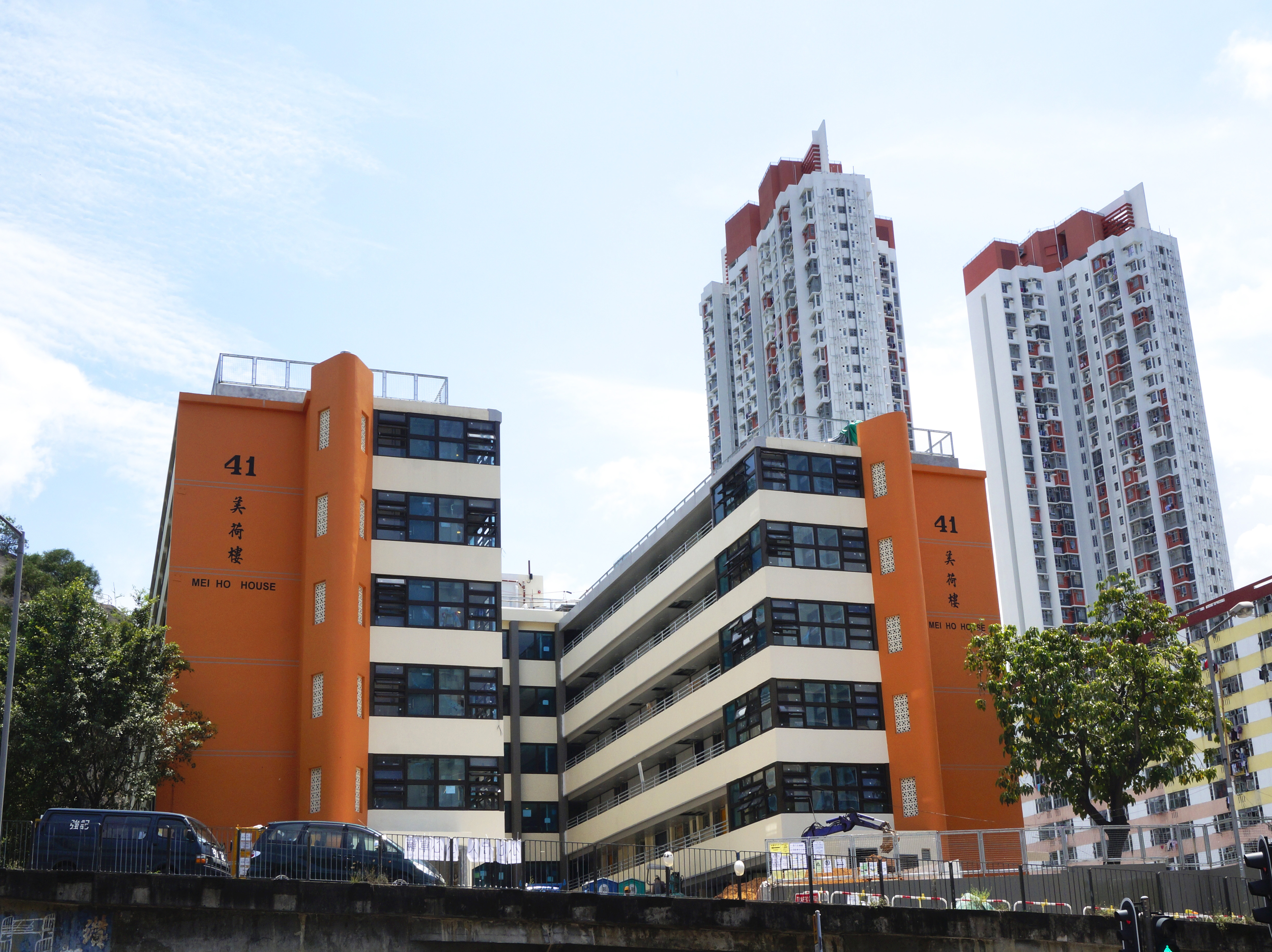
Mei Ho House, of Shek Kip Mei Estate near Tai Po Road, in 2013, after its renovation and conversion into a youth hostel.

Block 41 of the estate, Mei Ho House (美荷樓), the last remaining example of the "Mark II" building in a single-block configuration, has been listed as a Grade I historic building, and will be preserved tentatively as a record of Hong Kong's public housing development. In 2008, it was part of the seven buildings of Batch I of the Hong Kong Government's Revitalising Historic Buildings Through Partnership Scheme seeking adaptive reuse of government-owned historic buildings. On 17 February 2009, the government declared that the building would be used by the Hong Kong Youth Hostels Association as "City Hostel". The capital cost of the project was estimated at HK$192.3 million. Estimated completion time was early 2012. The hostel was finally opened in December 2013.

- It was closed due to the COVID-19 epidemic.*

== COVID-19 pandemic ==
Mei Wui House of the estate was in locked down for mandatory testing on 17 February 2022. Block 21 was also put into lockdown from the next day to 20 February.

== Blocks ==
As of 2021 the estate has 21 blocks, plus the preserved Block 41 presently in use as a youth hostel. The 21 blocks provide 10,800 public rental flats accommodating a design population of 26,400.

English name	Chinese name	Type	Completion	Notes
Block 19	(No Chinese name)	Old slab	1977	
Block 20	(No Chinese name)	Old slab	1977	
Block 21	(No Chinese name)	Old slab	1977	
Block 22	(No Chinese name)	Old slab	1977	
Block 23	(No Chinese name)	Old slab	1977	
Block 24	(No Chinese name)	Old slab	1979	
Block 41 (Mei Ho House)	美荷樓	Mark I	1954	Student hostel
Block 42	美山樓	Old slab	1983	
Block 43	美虹樓	Old slab	1983	
Block 44	美彩樓	Old slab	1983	
Mei Yue House	美如樓	Non-standard	2007	
Mei Ying House	美映樓	Non-standard	2007	
Mei Leong House	美亮樓	Non-standard	2012	
Mei Sang House	美笙樓	Non-standard	2012	
Mei Shing House	美盛樓	Non-standard	2012	
Mei Wui House	美薈樓	Non-standard	2012	
Mei Yick House	美益樓	Non-standard	2012	
Mei Yin House	美賢樓	Non-standard	2012	
Mei Kwai House	美葵樓	Non-standard	2019	
Mei Cheong House	美菖樓	Non-standard	2019	
Mei Hei House	美禧樓	Non-standard	2019	
Mei Pak House	美柏樓	Non-standard	2019	

Hong Kong Public Libraries maintains the Shek Kip Mei Public Library in the Shek Kip Mei Estate Ancillary Facilities Block.

== Gallery ==
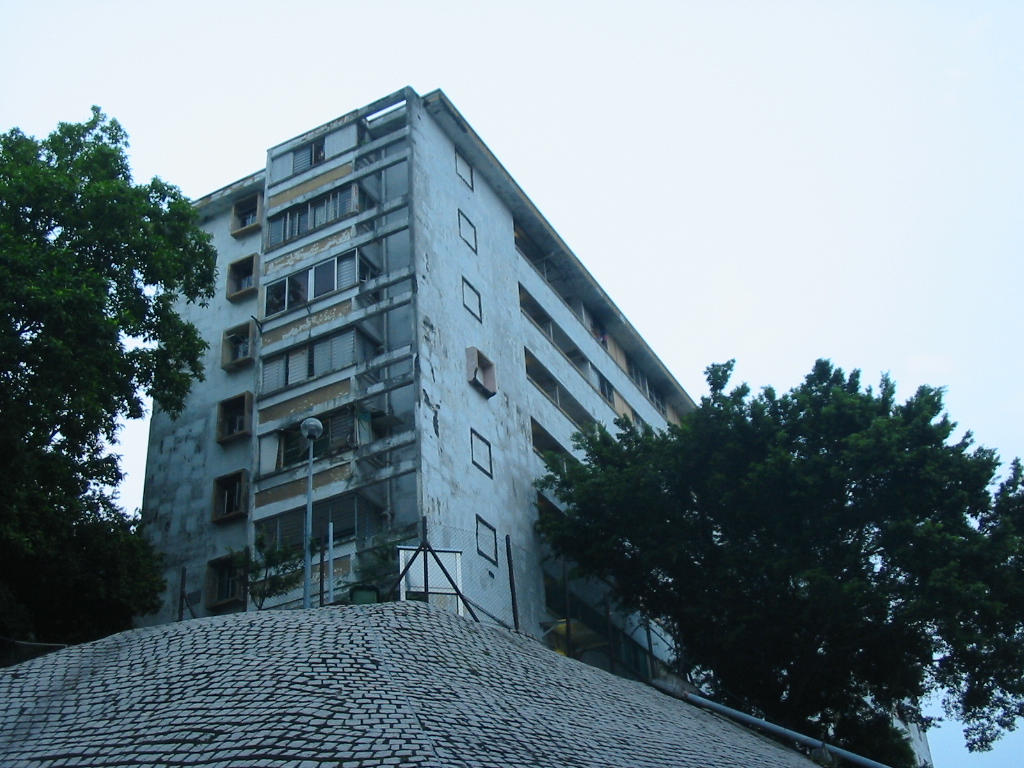
Block 14

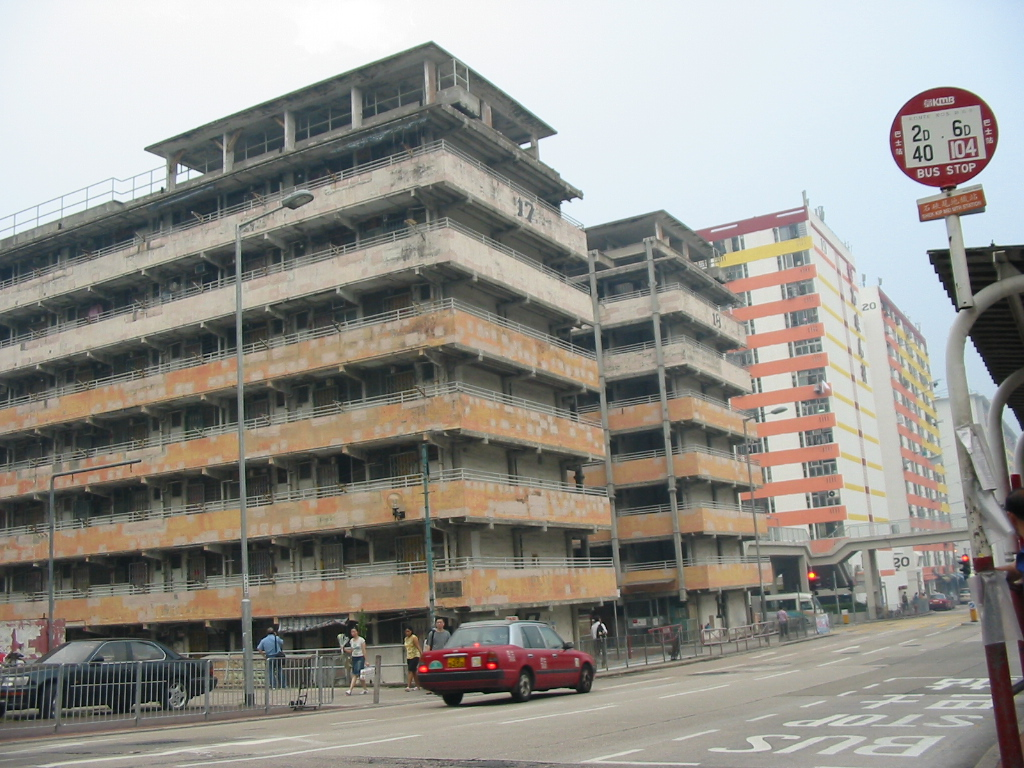
Block 17

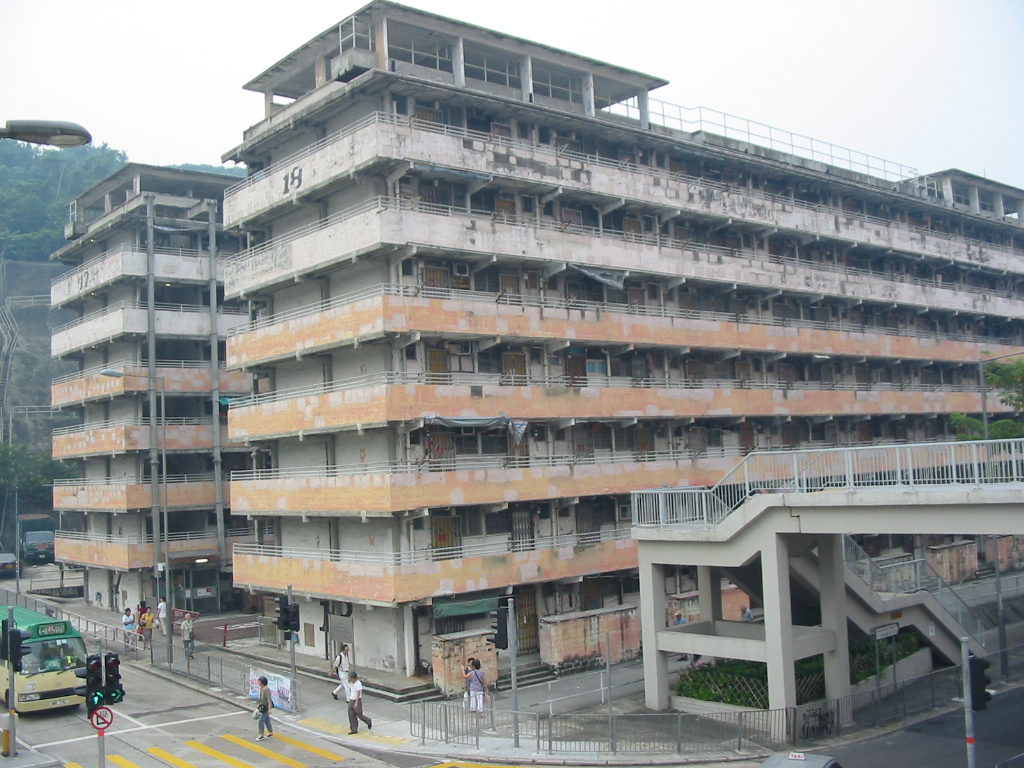
Block 18

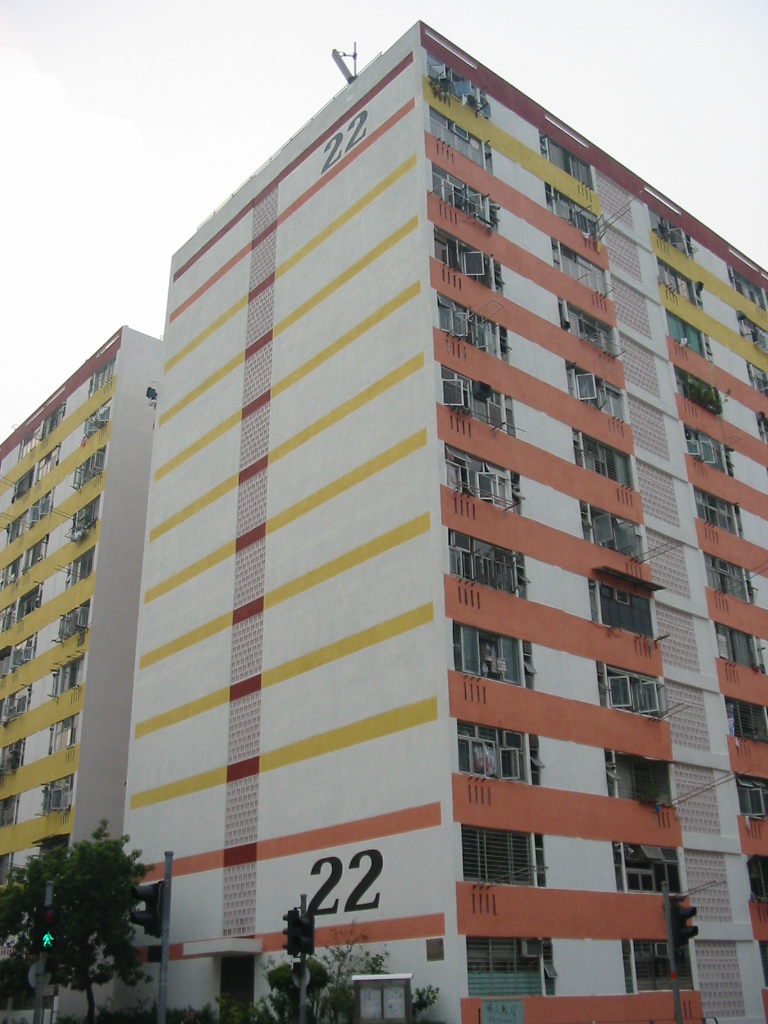
Block 22

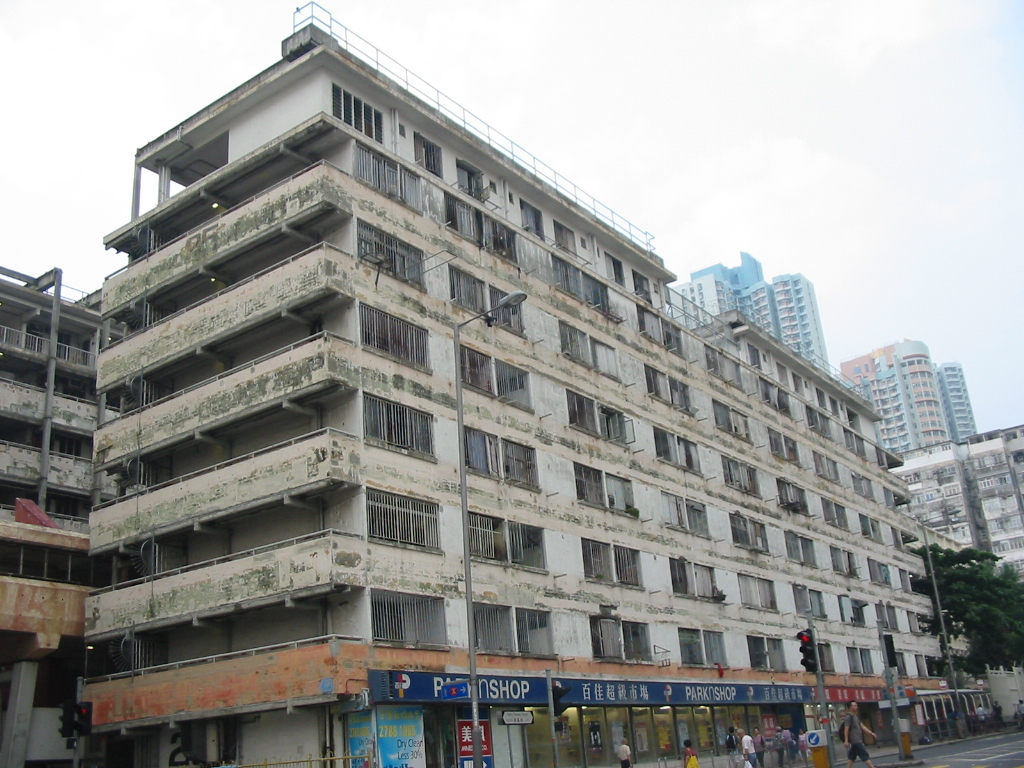
Block 25

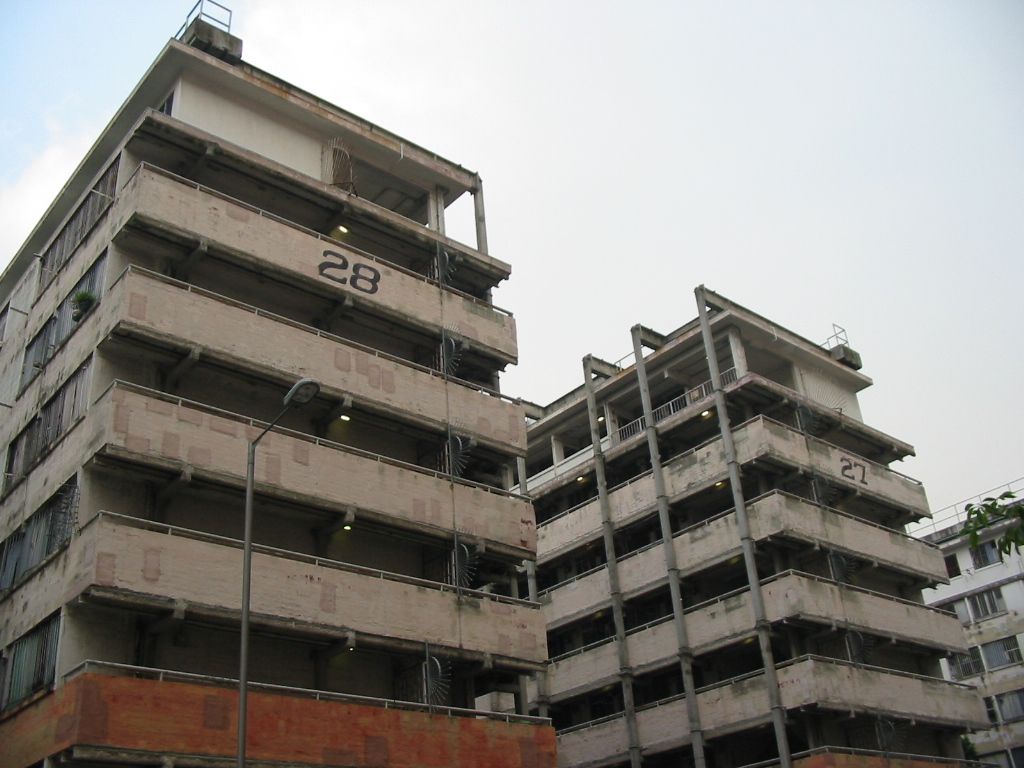
Blocks 27 & 28

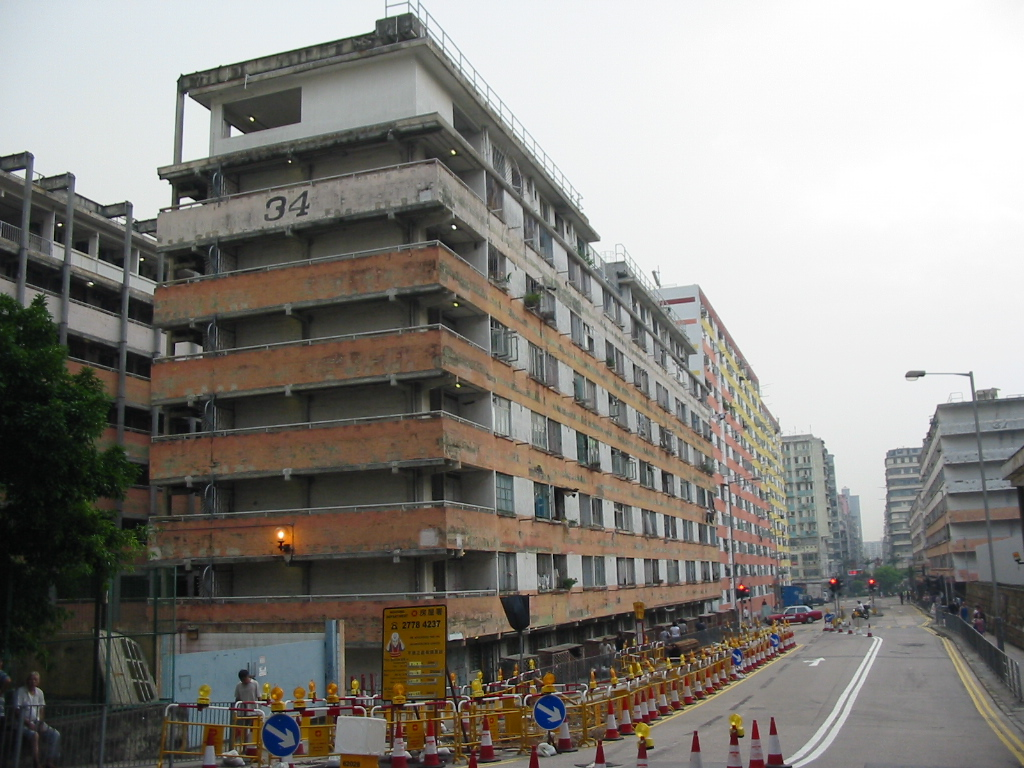
Block 34

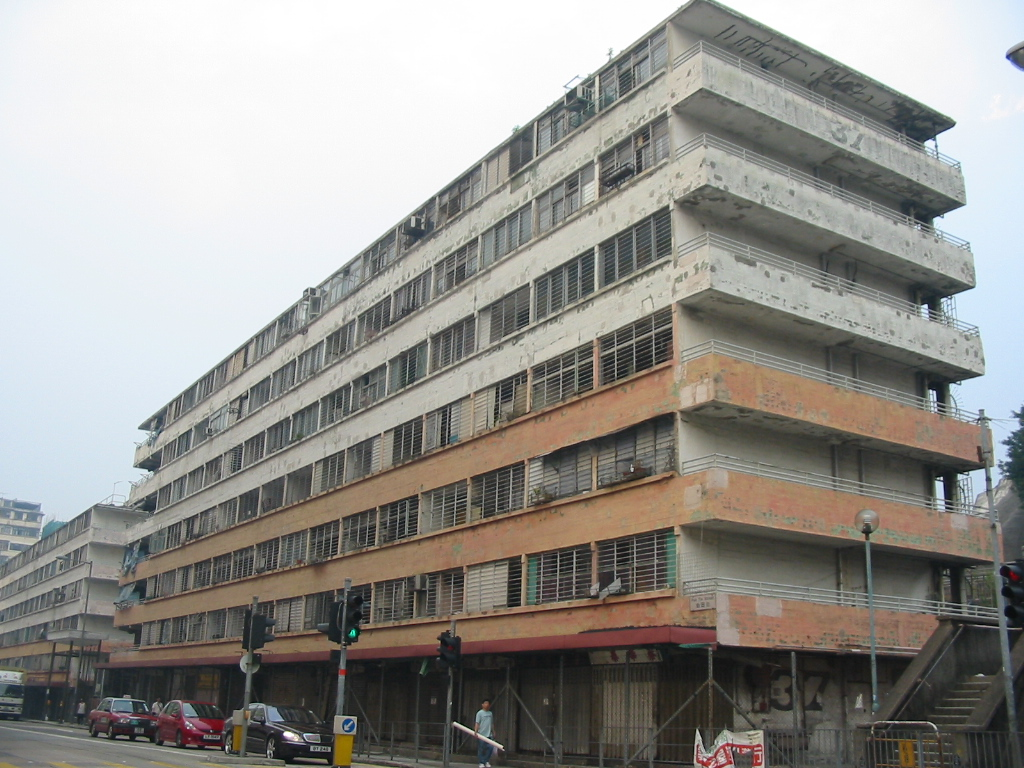
Block 37

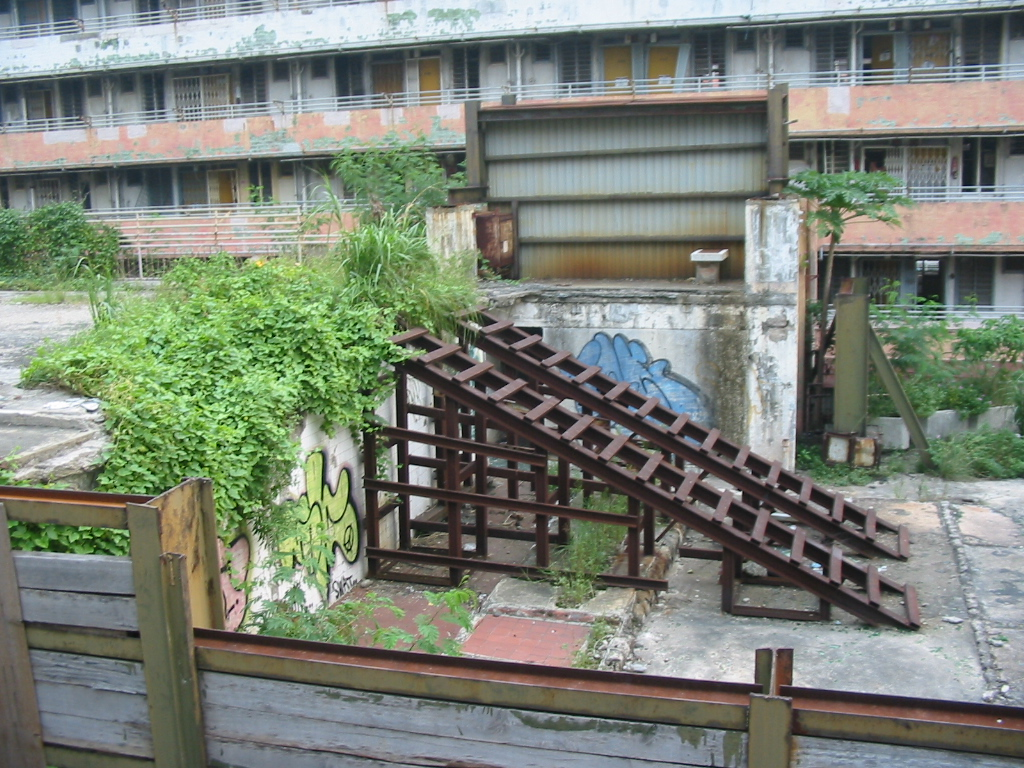
Demolished Block 38

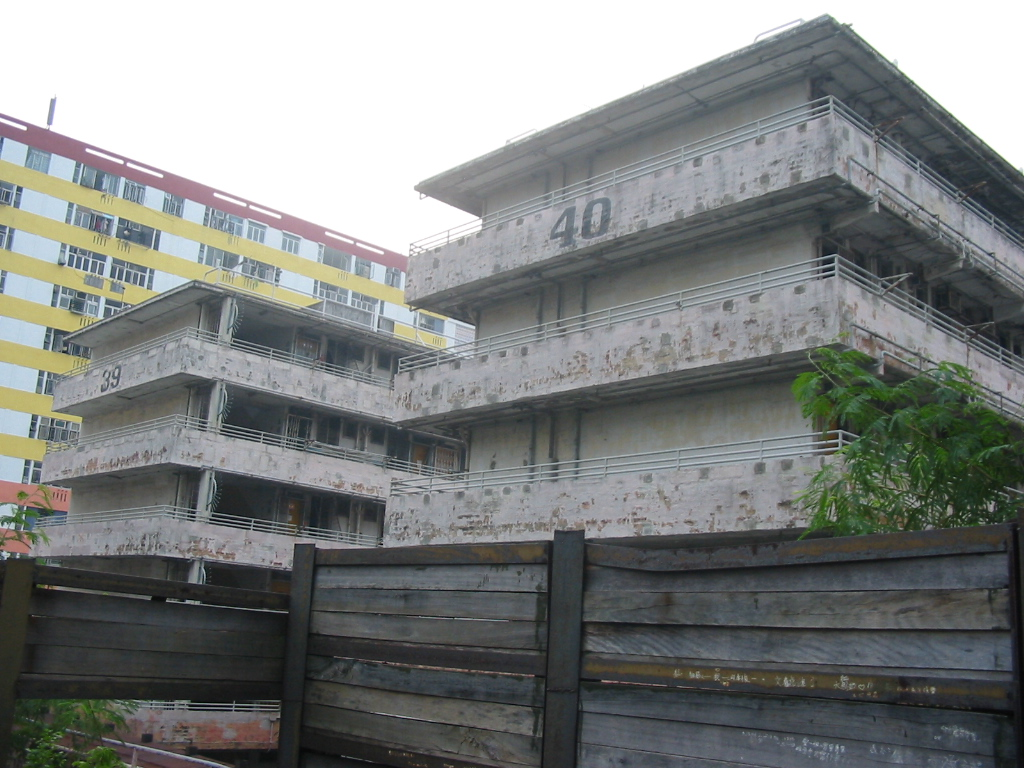
Blocks 39 & 40

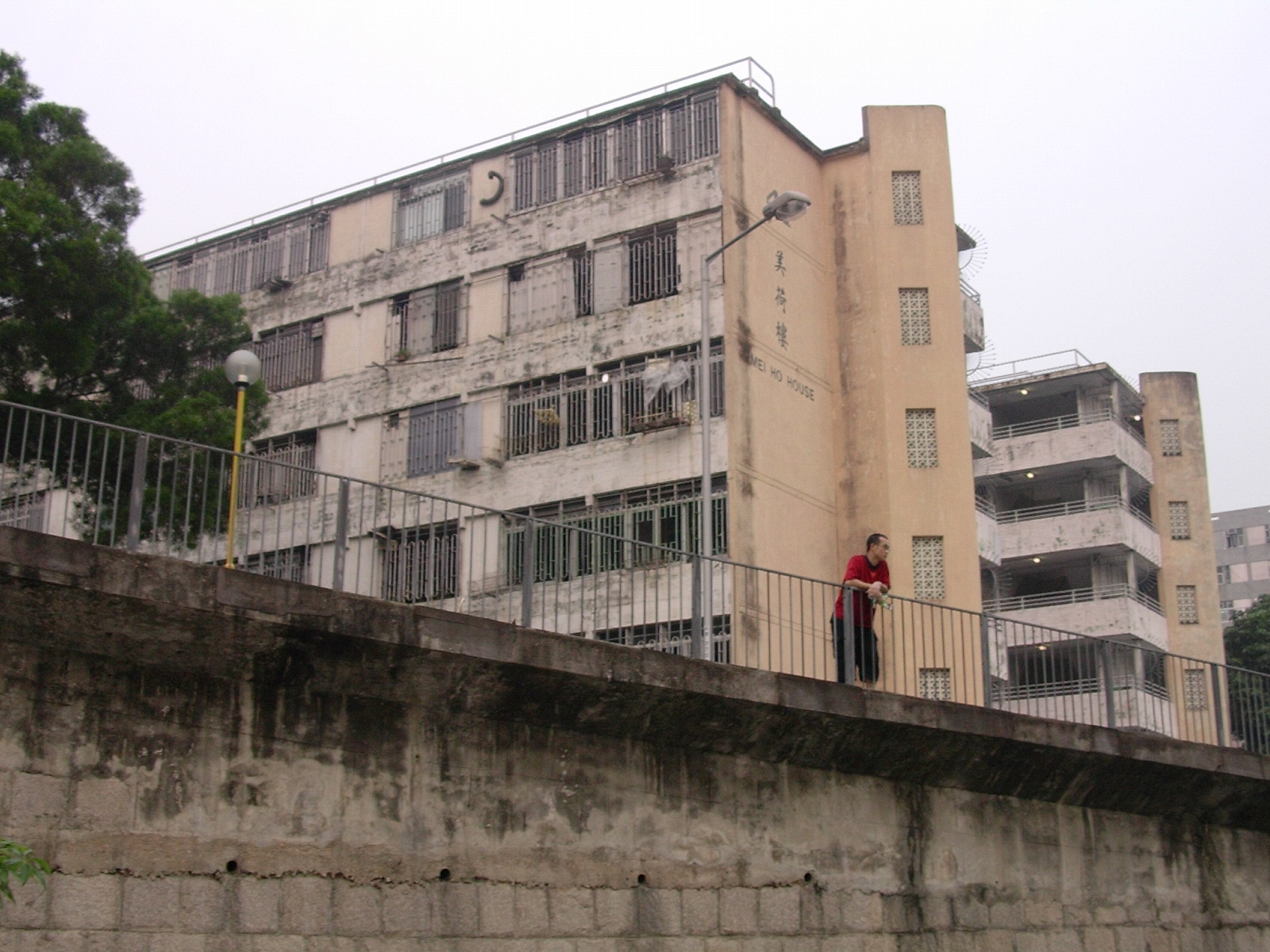
Block 41 Mei Ho House

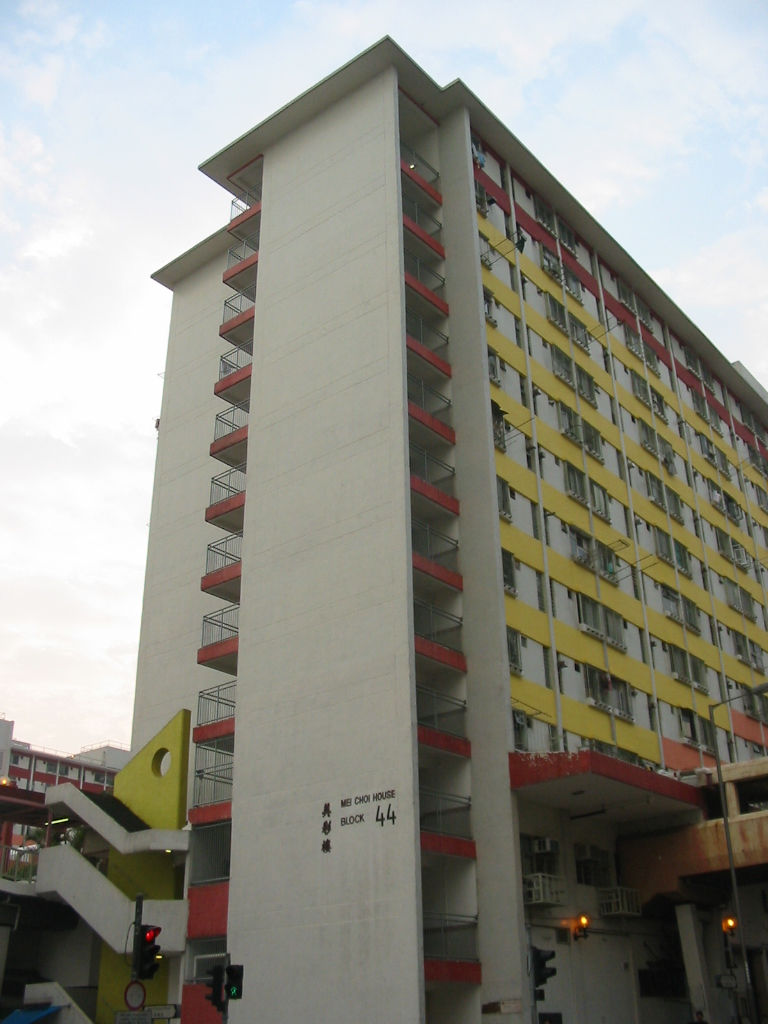
Block 44

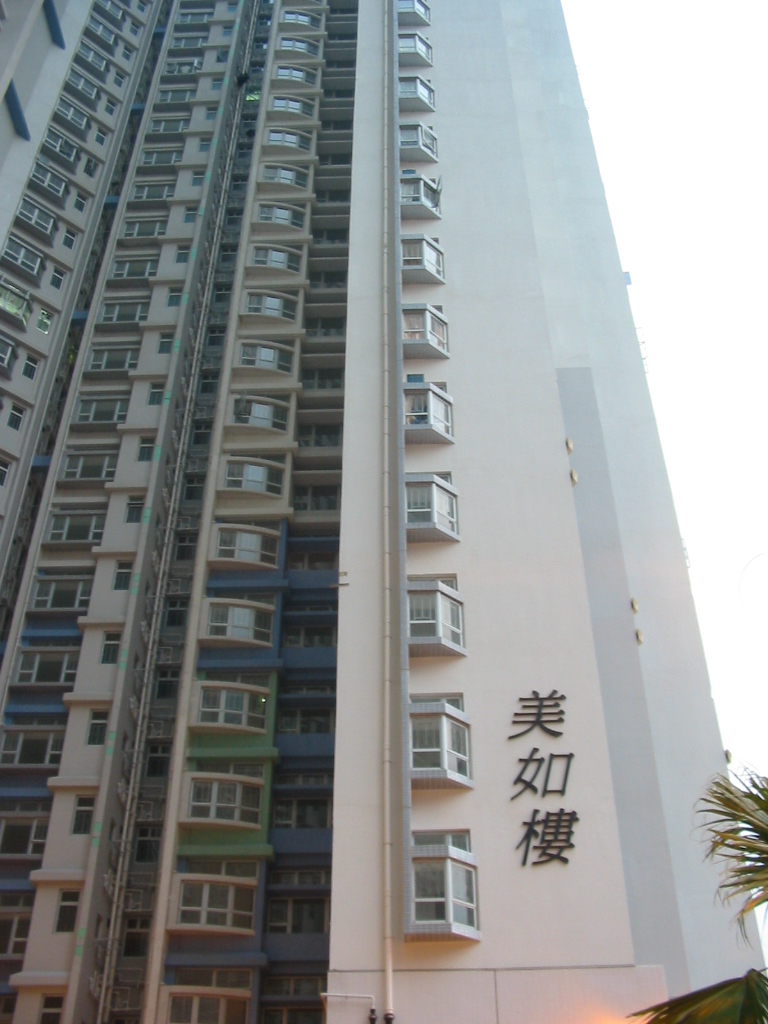
Rebuilt Mei Yu House

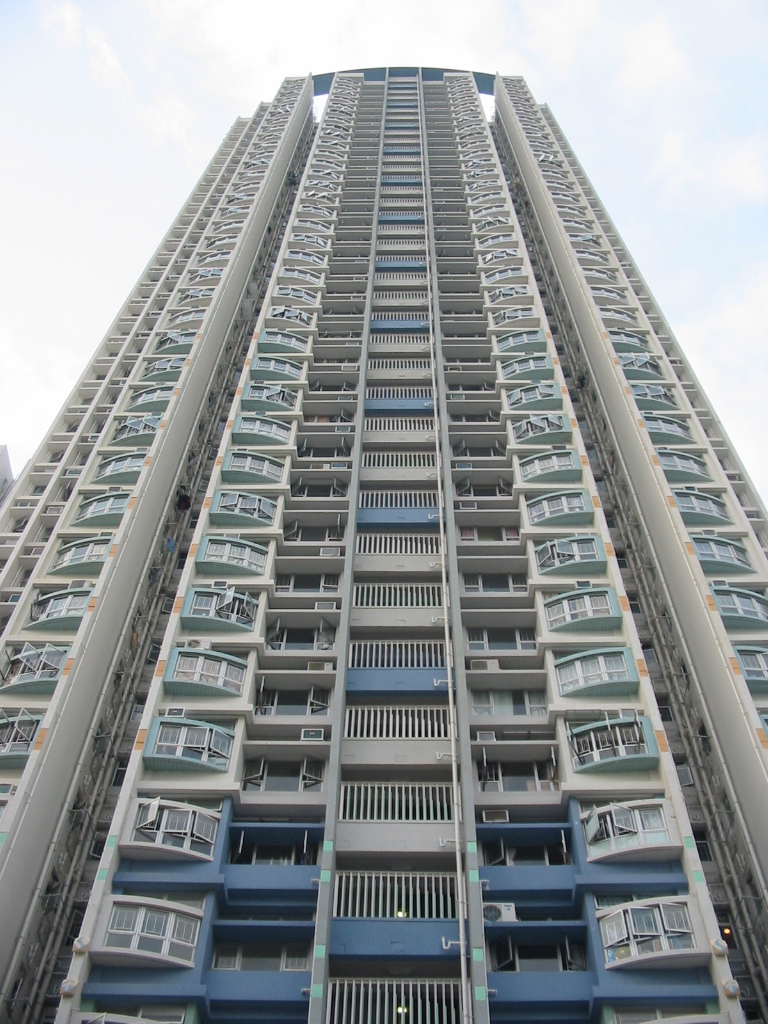
Rebuilt Mei Yu House

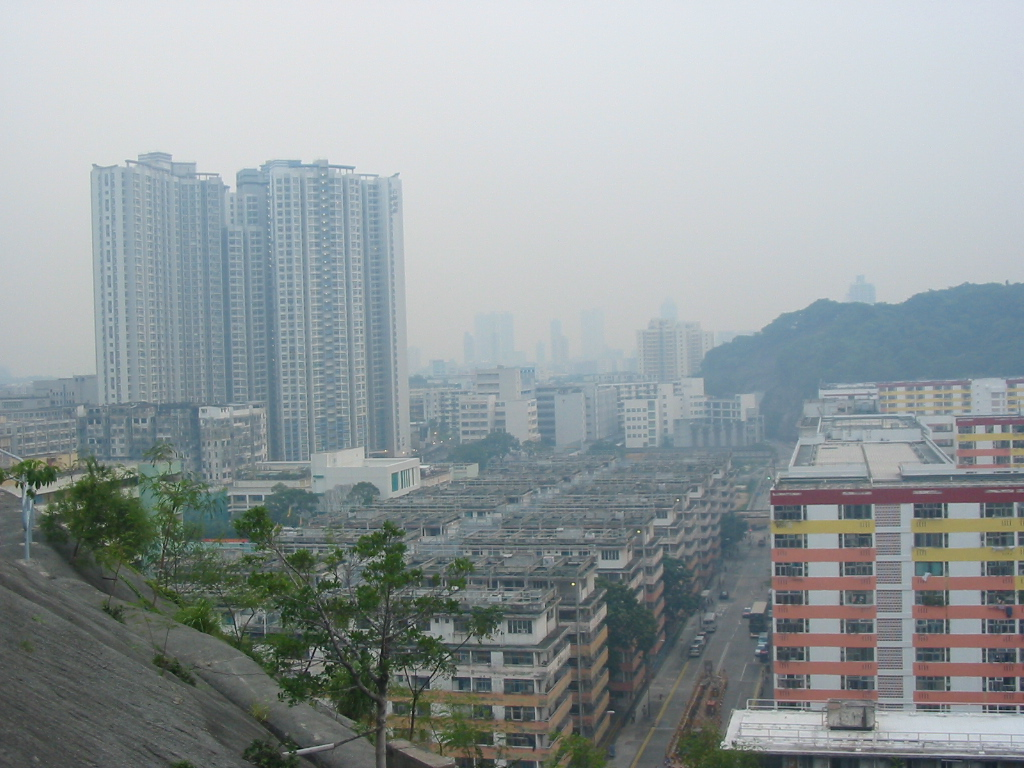
Distant vista of Shek Kip Mei Estate

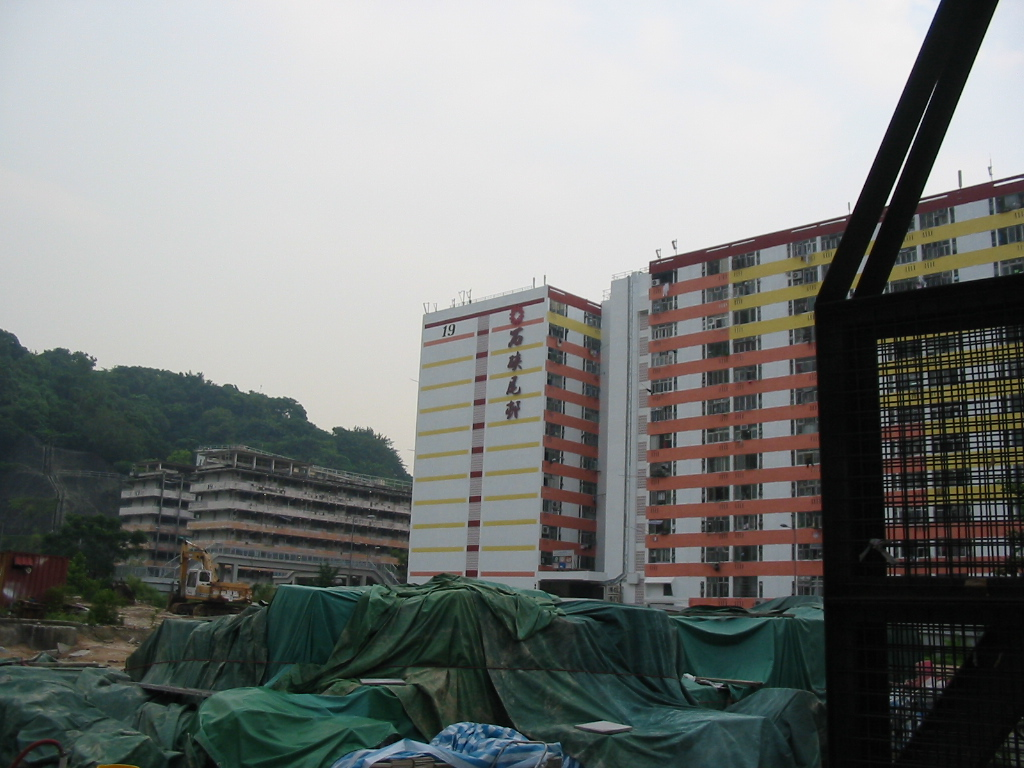
Distant vista of Shek Kip Mei Estate

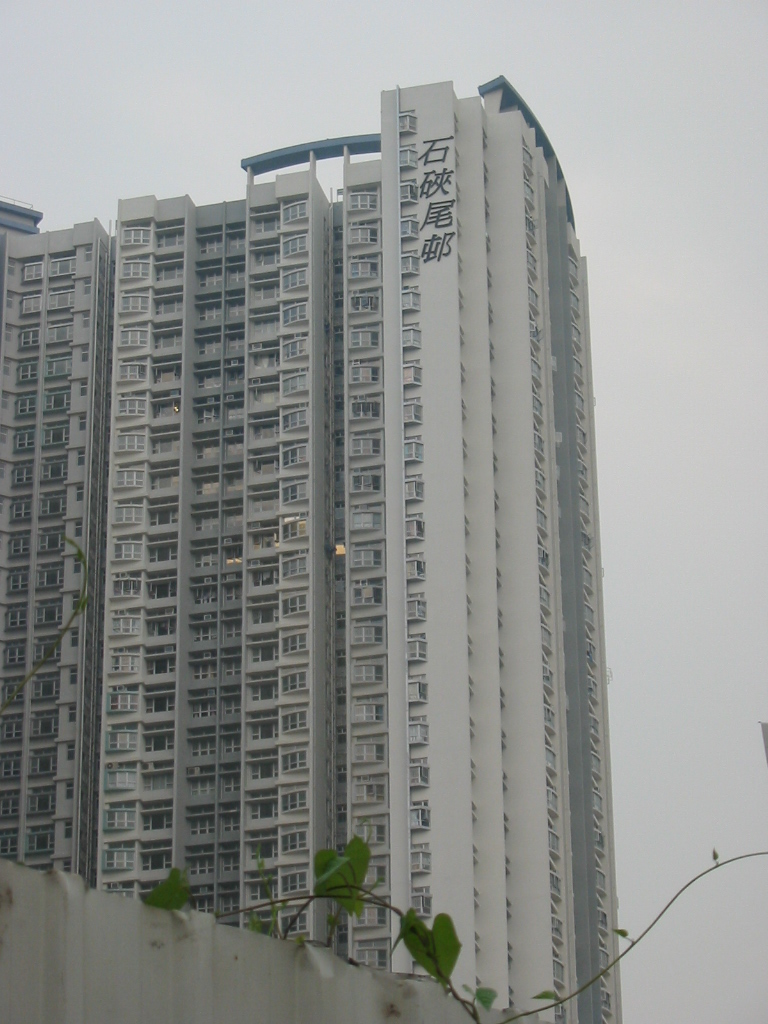
Phase one building

== See also ==
- List of public housing estates in Hong Kong
- Jockey Club Creative Arts Centre, housed in the former Shek Kip Mei Factory Estate
