= Lower Wong Tai Sin Estate =

Public housing estate in Wong Tai Sin, Hong Kong

Coordinates: 22.3383°N 114.1953°E

- Traditional Chinese: 黃大仙下邨
- Simplified Chinese: 黄大仙下邨
- Cantonese Yale: wòhng daaih sīn hah chyūn
Transcriptions
Standard Mandarin
- Hanyu Pinyin: Huángdàxiān Xià Cūn
Yue: Cantonese
- Yale Romanization: wòhng daaih sīn hah chyūn
- Jyutping: wong4 daai6 sin1 haa6 cyun1

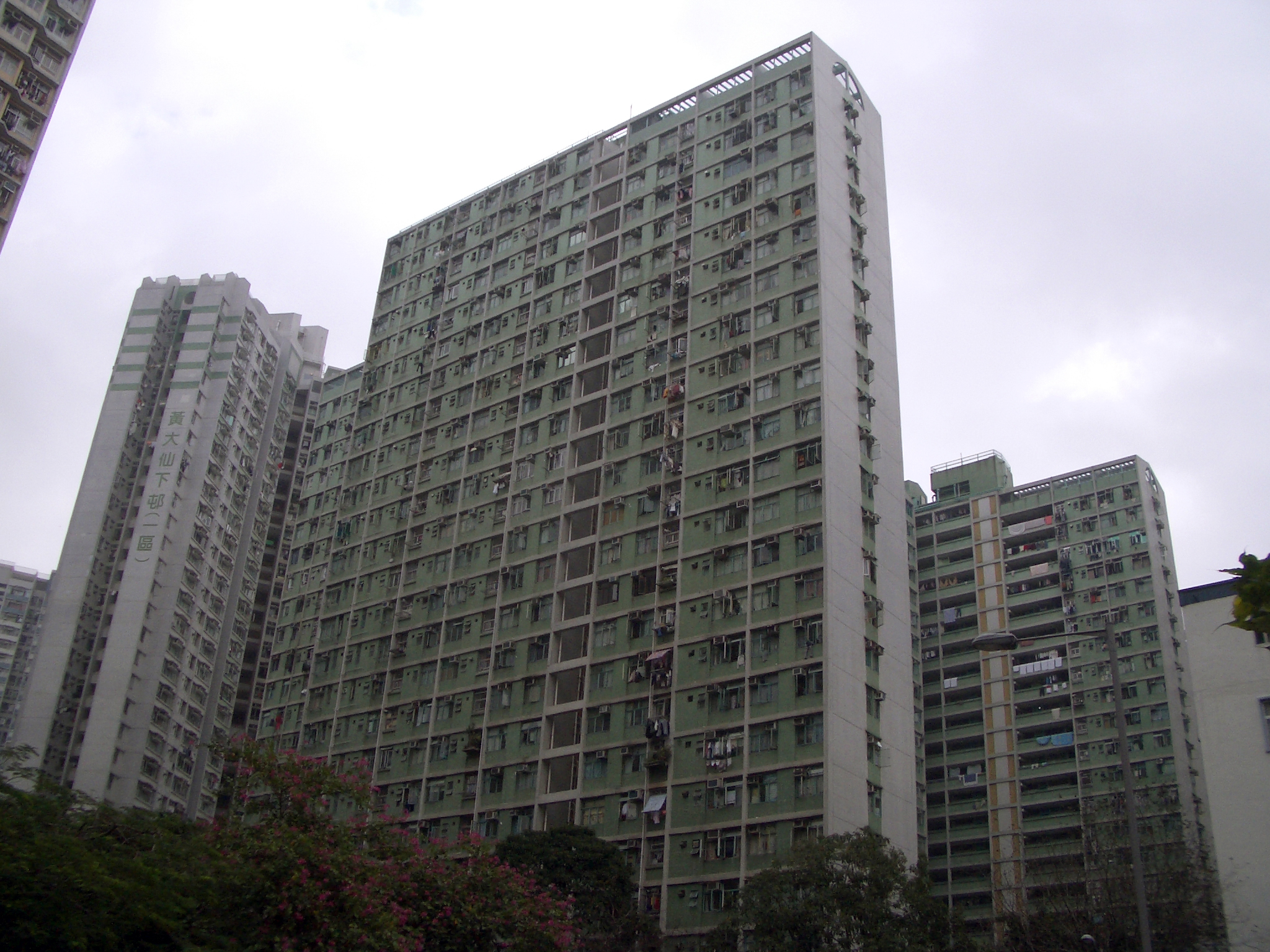
Lower Wong Tai Sin (I) Estate in February 2007

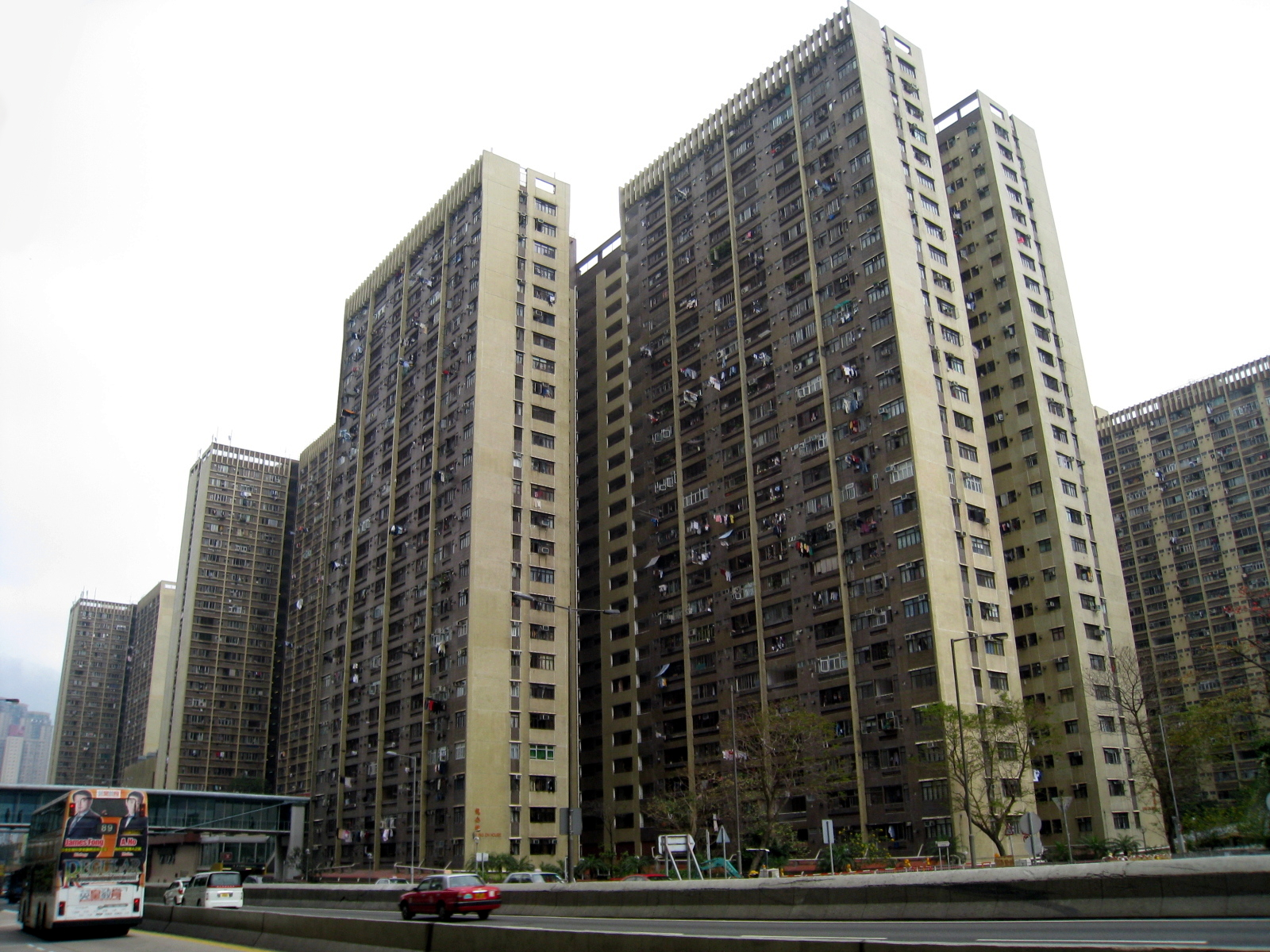
Lower Wong Tai Sin (II) Estate in April 2008

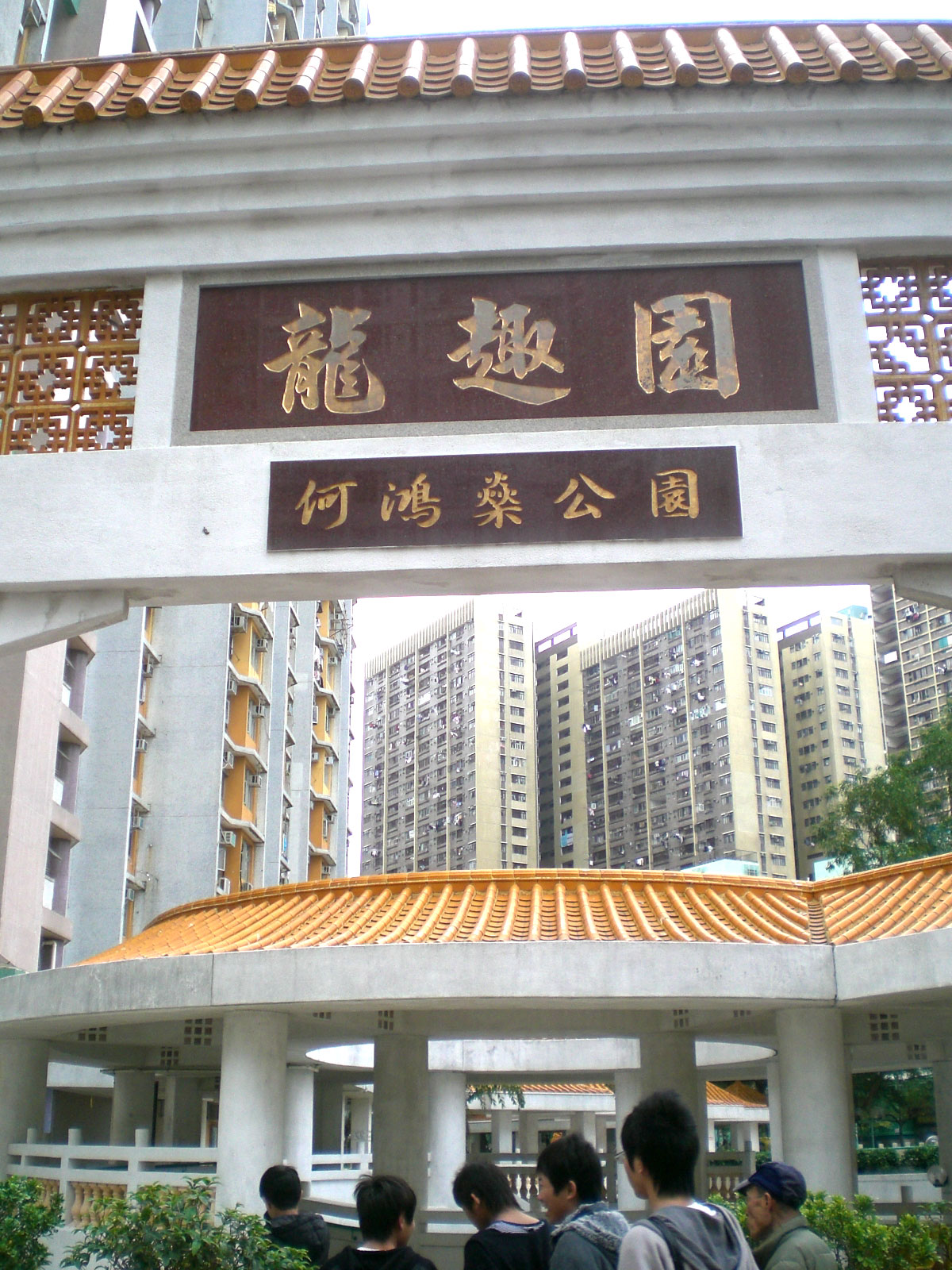
Lung Tsui Yuen Stanley Ho Park in January 2009

Lower Wong Tai Sin Estate
- Chinese: 黃大仙下邨
- Cantonese Yale: wòhng daaih sīn hah chyūn
Transcriptions
Yue: Cantonese
- Yale Romanization: wòhng daaih sīn hah chyūn
- Jyutping: wong4 daai6 sin1 haa6 cyun1

Lower Wong Tai Sin Estate (Chinese: 黃大仙下邨) is a public housing estate and Tenants Purchase Scheme estate in Wong Tai Sin, Kowloon, Hong Kong, along the south of Lung Cheung Road, near Wong Tai Sin Temple and MTR Wong Tai Sin station. It is divided into Lower Wong Tai Sin (I) Estate (黃大仙下(一)邨) and Lower Wong Tai Sin (II) Estate (黃大仙下(二)邨). After redevelopment, the estate consists of a total of 24 blocks built between the 1980s and 1990s.

== Background ==
Lower Wong Tai Sin Estate was formerly a resettlement estate, called Wong Tai Sin Resettlement Estate (黃大仙徙置屋邨). It had 29 blocks built between the 1950s and 1960s with a total population of 97,000 at that time. In 1973, the estate was renamed as Lower Wong Tai Sin Estate. In 1980, Block 8 was reassigned to Upper Wong Tai Sin Estate and was renamed "Cheung Yan House" (長欣樓). Between the 1980s and 1990s, all old blocks were demolished to reconstruct new blocks. In 2001, some of the flats in Lower Wong Tai Sin (I) Estate were sold to tenants through Tenants Purchase Scheme Phase 4.

== Houses ==
=== Lower Wong Tai Sin (I) Estate ===
Name	Type	Completion
Lung Hong House	Linear 1	1990
Lung Chak House	Linear 1	1991
Lung Wing House	Linear 1	1989
Lung Wah House	Linear 1	1989
Lung Shun House	Linear 1	1989
Lung Fung House	Trident 4	1989
Lung Tat House	Trident 4	1989
Lung Yat House	Trident 4	1989
Lung Yue House	Trident 4	1989

=== Lower Wong Tai Sin (II) Estate ===
Name	Type	Completion
Lung Fai House	Old Slab	1985
Lung Kwong House	Old Slab	1985
Lung Lok House	Double H	1985
Lung On House	Double H	1985
Lung Shing House	Double H	1985
Lung Hing House	Double H	1985
Lung Gut House	Single H	1985
Lung Fook House	Single H	1982
Lung Cheong House	Harmony 3	1996
Lung Chi House	Harmony 3	1996
Lung Wai House	Harmony 3	1996
Lung Wo House	Harmony 3	1996
Lung Hei House	Harmony 3	1996
Lung Tai House	Harmony 3	1996
Lung Moon House	Harmony 3	1996

== Facilities ==
Hong Kong Public Libraries maintains the Lung Hing Public Library in Lung Hing House, Lower Wong Tai Sin (II) Estate.

== Others ==
- Upper Wong Tai Sin Estate
