= Resettlement Department =

Former Hong Kong government agency

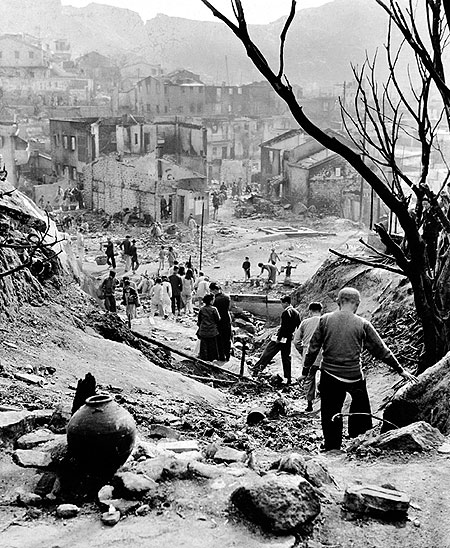
The slum area in Shek Kip Mei after the great fire on the Christmas Day of 1953.

The Resettlement Department (Chinese: 徙置事務處) was a department of the Government of Hong Kong, responsible for constructing resettlement estates for homeless refugees, established in 1954. In 1973, the Resettlement Department and the Building Section of the Urban Services Department were merged to form the Housing Department, which acts as the Housing Authority's executive body.

== History ==
In December 1953, a major fire destroyed the slum area in Shek Kip Mei and more than 50,000 refugees from Mainland China were made homeless. After the disaster, then Governor Sir Alexander Grantham ordered Ronald Holmes to establish the Resettlement Department and appointed him as the Deputy Colonial Secretary and the first Commissioner of Resettlement. The Resettlement Department was formed from sections of the Public Works Department, the Social Welfare Department, and the Urban Services Department. The development of public housing marked a radical shift from the laissez-faire philosophy of the Government.

In order to resettle the homeless refugees in a short period of time, Holmes took the lead to construct a number of resettlement estates on the burnt ground in Shek Kip Mei and in its neighboring area. Some of the notable examples included Shek Kip Mei Estate and Tai Hang Tung Estate. After the creation of the Resettlement Department, constructing public housing estate for resettling the poor people became one of the primary policy goals set by the government in postwar Hong Kong. In October 1955, when he succeeded the retired Harold Giles Richards as the Director of Urban Services, Ronald Holmes stepped down from the Resettlement Department and was succeeded by Arthur Walton as Commissioner of Resettlement.

The Resettlement Department built a total of 25 housing estates between 1954 and 1973. The ten-year public housing programme proposed by Governor Sir Murray MacLehose led to the need for a "corporatized housing authority." The establishment of the Housing Department inherited and expanded the projects and plans of the Resettlement Department.

== See also ==
- Public housing in Hong Kong
- Public factory estates in Hong Kong
