= Shek Kip Mei fire =

1953 disaster in Hong Kong

Coordinates: 22.3322°N 114.1683°E

- Traditional Chinese: 石硤尾大火
- Simplified Chinese: 石硖尾大火
Transcriptions
Standard Mandarin
- Hanyu Pinyin: Shíxiáwěi dàhuǒ
Wu
- Wugniu: zeq^{8} ciaq^{7} mi^{4} du^{6} hu^{3}
Yue: Cantonese
- Jyutping: sek^{6} gip^{3} mei^{5} daai^{6} fo^{2}

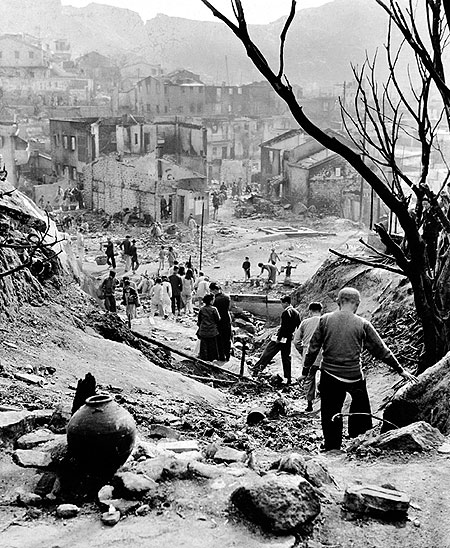
Shek Kip Mei fire aftermath

The Shek Kip Mei fire (Chinese: 石硤尾大火; Jyutping: sek^{6} gip^{3} mei^{5} daai^{6} fo^{2}) took place in Hong Kong on 25 December 1953. It destroyed the Shek Kip Mei shanty town of immigrants from mainland China who had fled to Hong Kong, leaving over 53,000 people homeless.

The area that was destroyed by the fire is bounded by Boundary St. and Tai Po Rd.

After the fire, the governor Alexander Grantham launched a public housing programme to introduce the idea of "multi-storey building" for the immigrant population living there. The standardised new structures offered fire- and flood-resistant construction to previously vulnerable hut dwellers. The programme involved demolishing the rest of the makeshift houses left untouched by the fire, and the construction of the Shek Kip Mei Low-cost Housing Estate in their stead. Alongside a huge volunteer effort, the council spent nearly HK$16 million in relief work.

== See also ==
- Interim Housing
