= Public housing estates in Wong Tai Sin =

Public housing in Wong Tai Sin, Hong Kong

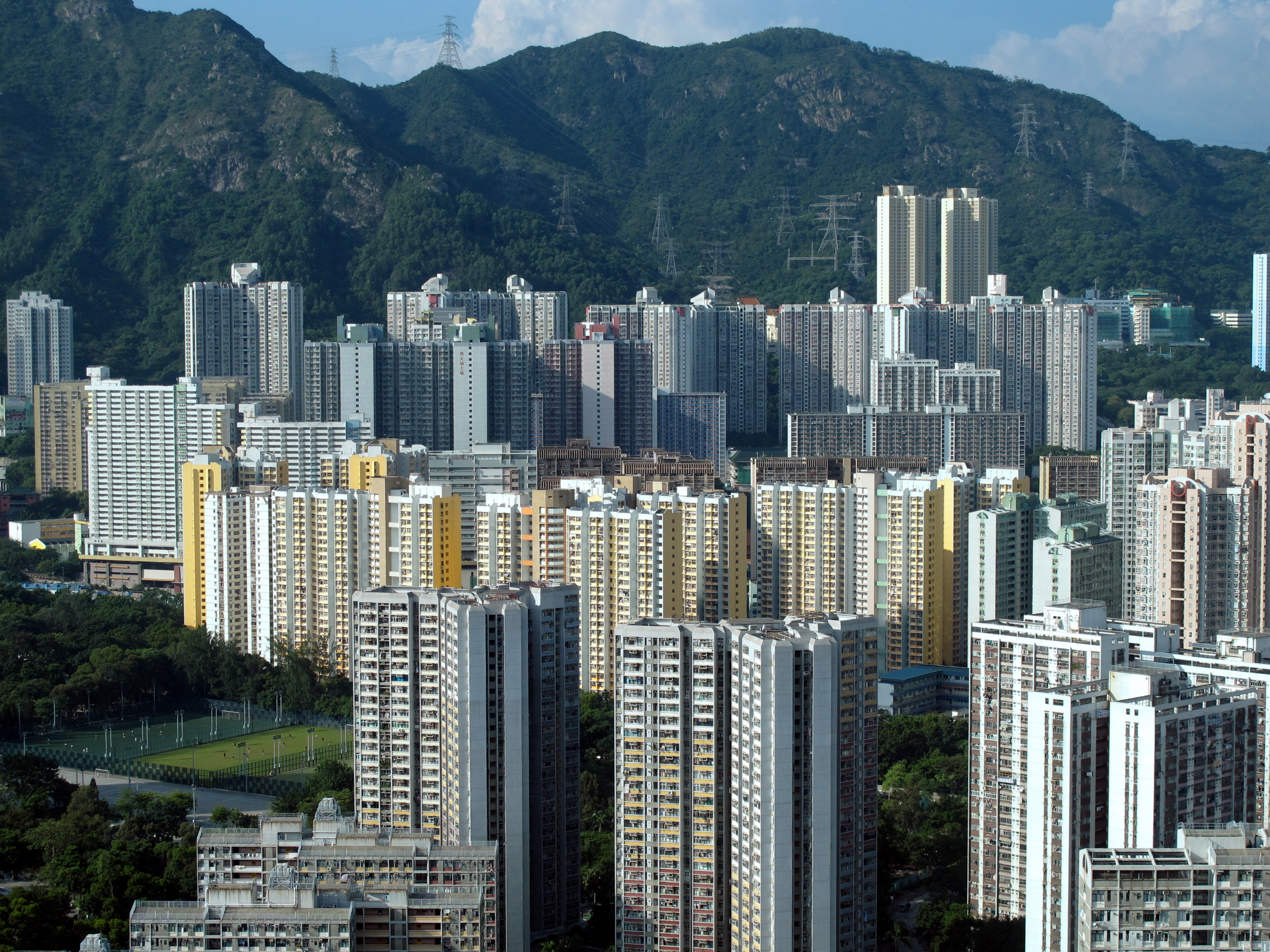
A view of various public housing estates in Wong Tai Sin beneath Lion Rock

The following is a list of public housing estates in Wong Tai Sin, Kowloon, Hong Kong including Home Ownership Scheme (HOS), Private Sector Participation Scheme (PSPS), Sandwich Class Housing Scheme (SCHS), Flat-for-Sale Scheme (FFSS), and Tenants Purchase Scheme (TPS) estates.

== History ==
Lok Fu, Wong Tai Sin, Wang Tau Hom, and Tung Tau were home to a large number of public housing blocks built in the 1950s and 1960s to provide accommodation to Hong Kong's burgeoning population of refugee migrants. This type of housing, built in haste with limited resources, was rudimentary. The flats were no more than single rooms and families on each floor shared toilet and bathing facilities. In the 1980s, there was a push to redevelop the first generation of estates so that each family was housed in a self-contained flat. By the late 1980s, much of the area had been rebuilt.

== Overview ==
Name		Type	Inaug.	No Blocks	No Units	Notes
Chuk Yuen (North) Estate	竹園北邨	TPS	1987	8	1,665	
Chuk Yuen (South) Estate	竹園南邨	Public	1984	8	6,621	
Kai Cheung Court	啟翔苑	HOS	2023	2	940	
Kai Chuen Court	啟鑽苑	HOS	2021,2024	5		
Kai Tak Garden	啟德花園	Flat-for-Sale	1998, 2001	5	1,256	HK Housing Society
Mei Tung Estate	美東邨	Public	1974	4	2,500	
Pang Ching Court	鵬程苑	HOS	1991	1	816	
Tin Ma Court	天馬苑	HOS	1986	5	2,800	
Tin Wang Court	天宏苑	HOS	1992	3	630	
Tsui Chuk Garden	翠竹花園	PSPS	1989	14	3,524	
Tung Tau (I) Estate	東頭(一)邨	Public	1965	1	906	
Tung Tau (II) Estate	東頭(二)邨	TPS	1982	20	3,011	
Tung Wui Estate	東匯邨	Public	2012	2	1,300	
Lower Wong Tai Sin (I) Estate	黃大仙下(一)邨	TPS	1989	9	2,018	
Lower Wong Tai Sin (II) Estate	黃大仙下(二)邨	Public	1982	15	6,779	
Upper Wong Tai Sin Estate	黃大仙上邨	Public	2000	8	4,873	
Ying Fuk Court	盈福苑	HOS	2001	1	370	

== Chuk Yuen Estate ==
Chuk Yuen Estate (Chinese: 竹園邨) is a public housing estate in Wong Tai Sin and underneath Lion Rock. It is divided into Chuk Yuen (North) Estate (Chinese: 竹園(北)邨) and Chuk Yuen (South) Estate (Chinese: 竹園(南)邨). The two estates has 8 blocks respectively, and all the blocks were built in the 1980s. In 1999, some of the flats were sold to tenants through Tenants Purchase Scheme Phase 2.

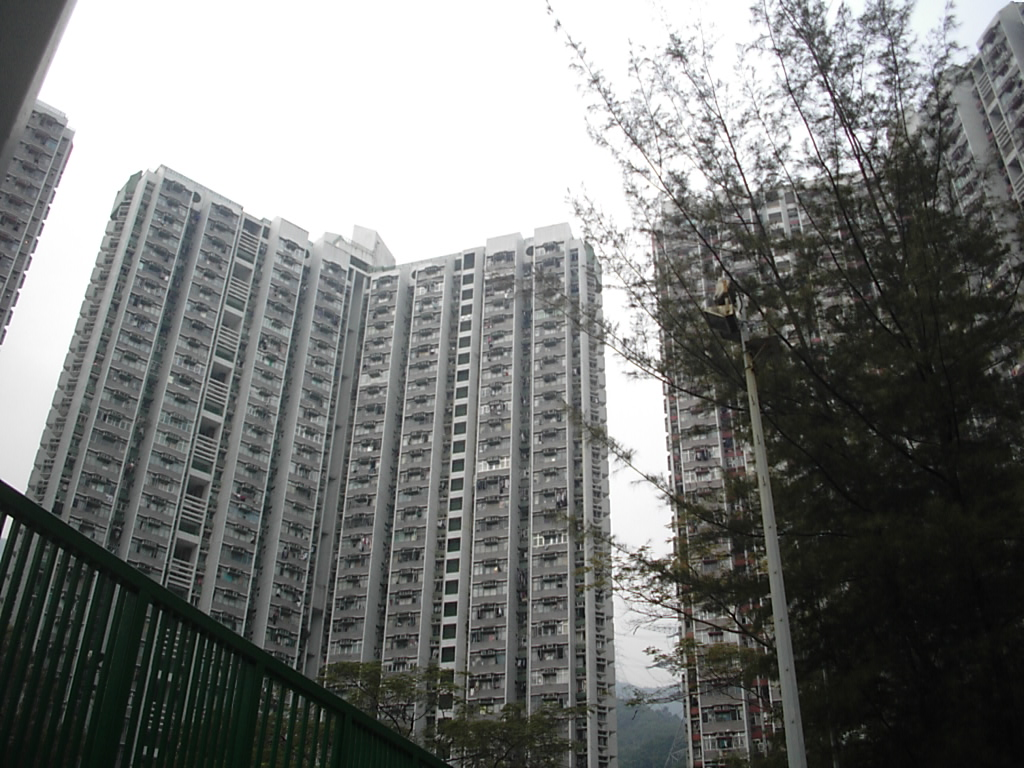
Chuk Yuen North Estate

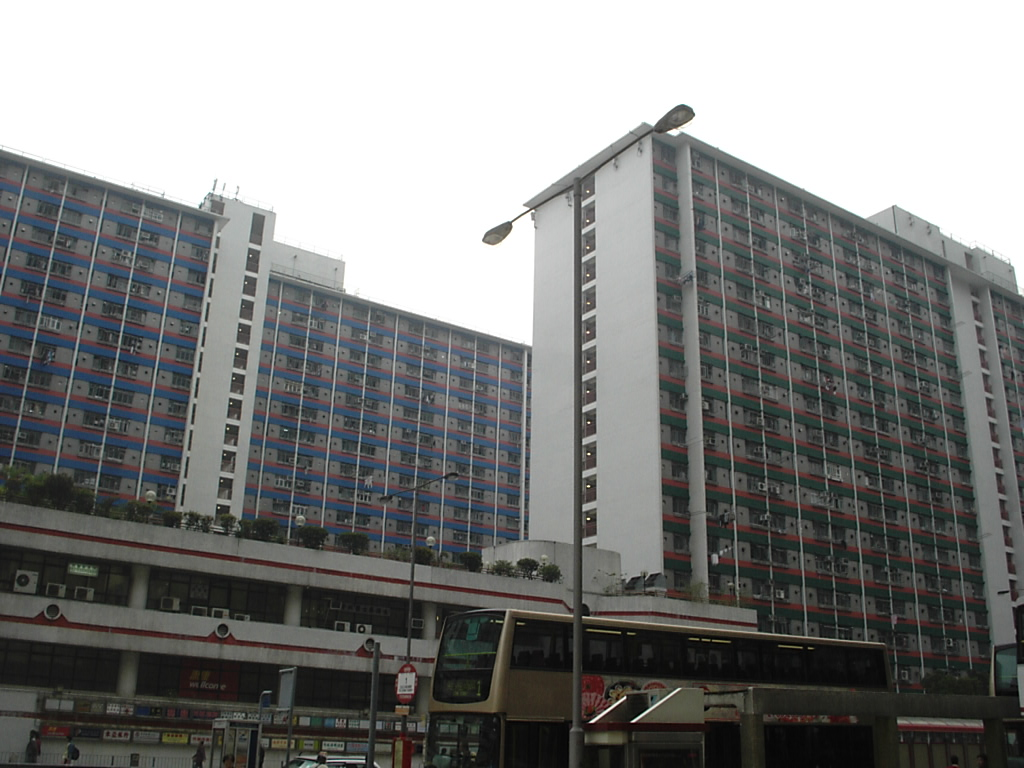
Chuk Yuen South Estate

== Kai Tak Garden ==
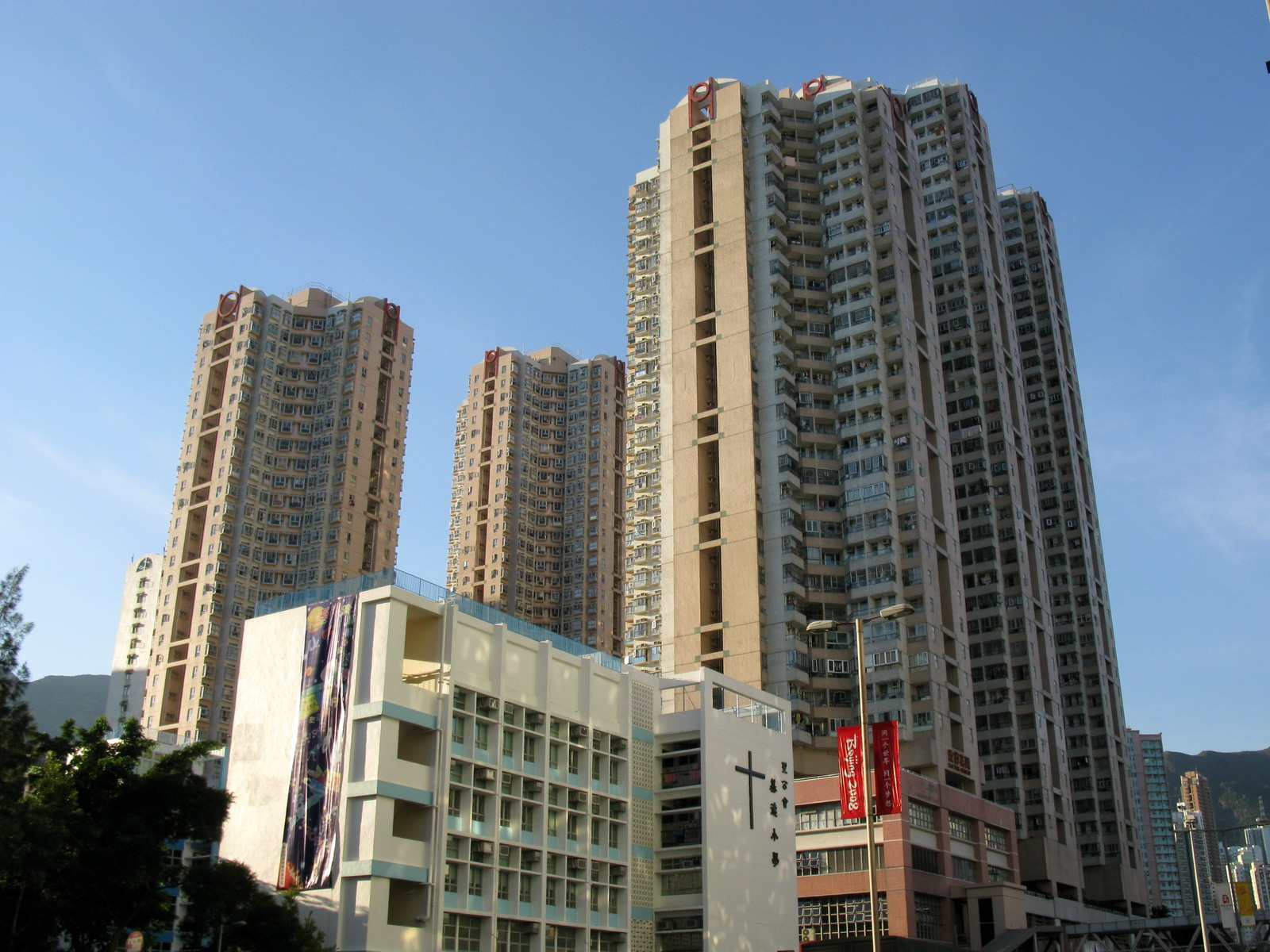
Kai Tak Garden

Kai Tak Garden (Chinese: 啟德花園) is a Flat-for-Sale Scheme court in Wong Tai Sin, formerly the site of Kai Tak Estate (Chinese: 啟德邨). It has 5 blocks developed by the Hong Kong Housing Society and built in 1998 (Block 1 to 3) and 2003 (Block 4 and 5) respectively.

Name	Completion
Block 1	1998
Block 2	1998
Block 3	1998
Block 4	2003
Block 5	2003

== Mei Tung Estate ==
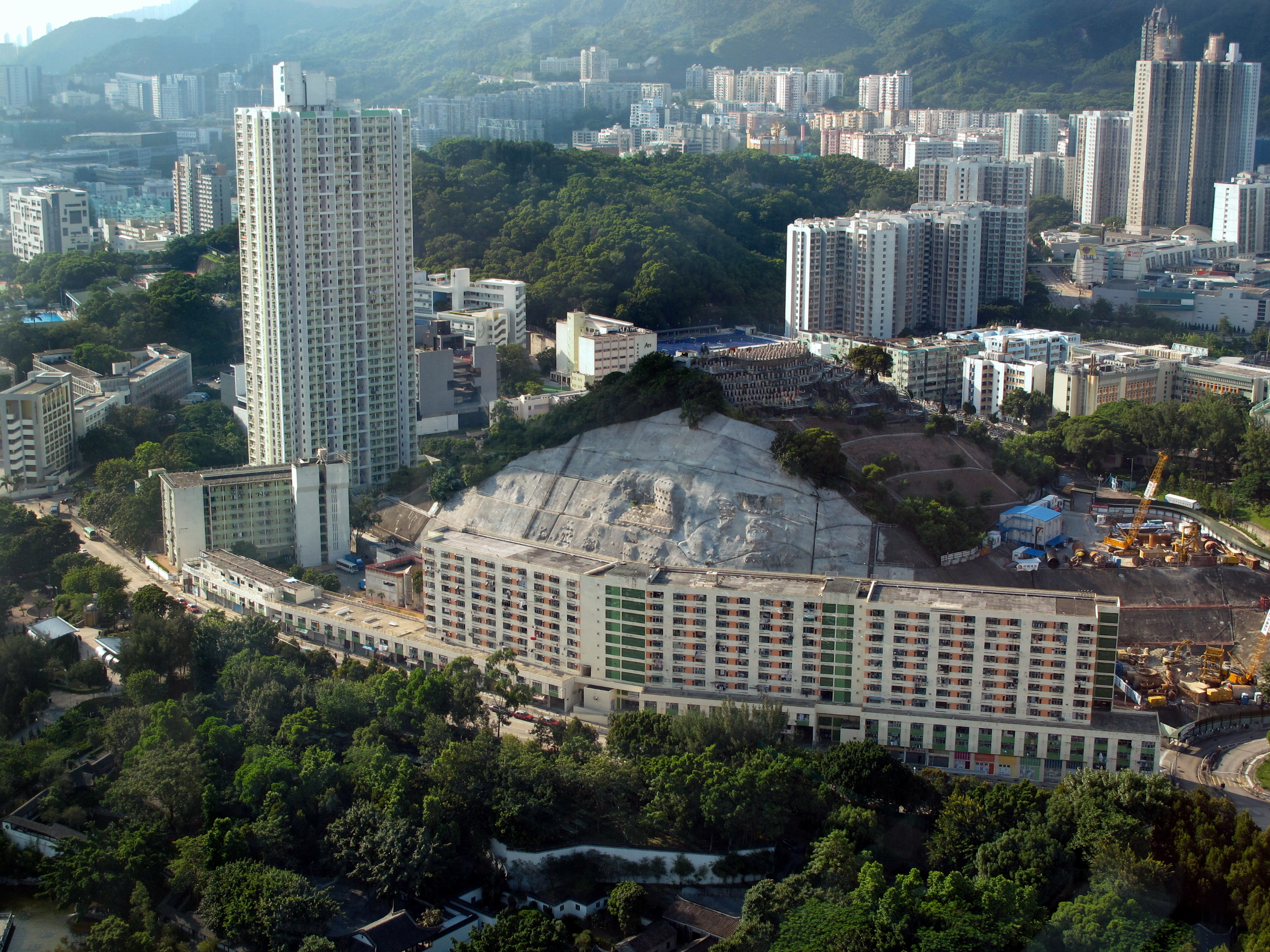
Overview of Mei Tung Estate in 2010 (before the construction of Mei Tak House)

Mei Tung Estate (Chinese: 美東邨) is a public housing estate at the south of Wong Tai Sin. It consists of 2 Old Slab-typed blocks, each building is 8-storey, providing over 600 flats. Although the estate is near Kowloon City, it belongs to Wong Tai Sin District rather than Kowloon City District because it is located at the north of Tung Tau Tsuen Road (Chinese: 東頭村道), the boundary between two districts. A third block opened in 2010, and a fourth opened in 2014.

=== Background ===
In 1971, the British Hong Kong Government cleared Tung Wo Village and Chiu Ping New Village in Tung Tau Squatter Area. In 1974, one block of the estate, "Block 6", was constructed. The government planned to demolish nearby Sai Tau Village in Kowloon City to construct remaining blocks, but the plan was strongly opposed by the village residents. As a result, the plan was left aside. (Sai Tau Village was finally demolished in 1984 to build the current Carpenter Road Park.) Since no other blocks were built, "Block 6" was renamed as "Mei Tung House" in 1979. In 1981, the government decided to construct one more block on the left side of Mei Tung House. In 1983, the block, "Mei Po House", was completed.

=== Houses ===
Name	Type	Completion
Mei Tung House	Old Slab	1974
Mei Po House	Old Slab	1983
Mei Yan House	Non-standard	2010
Mei Tak House	Non-standard	2014

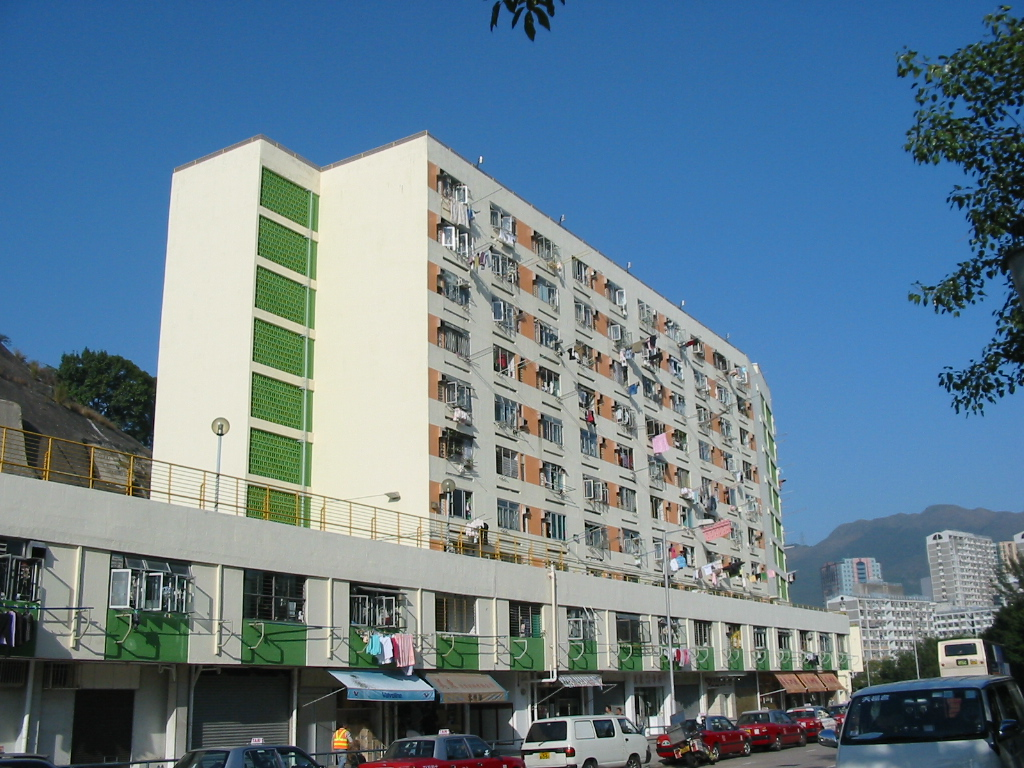
Mei Tung House

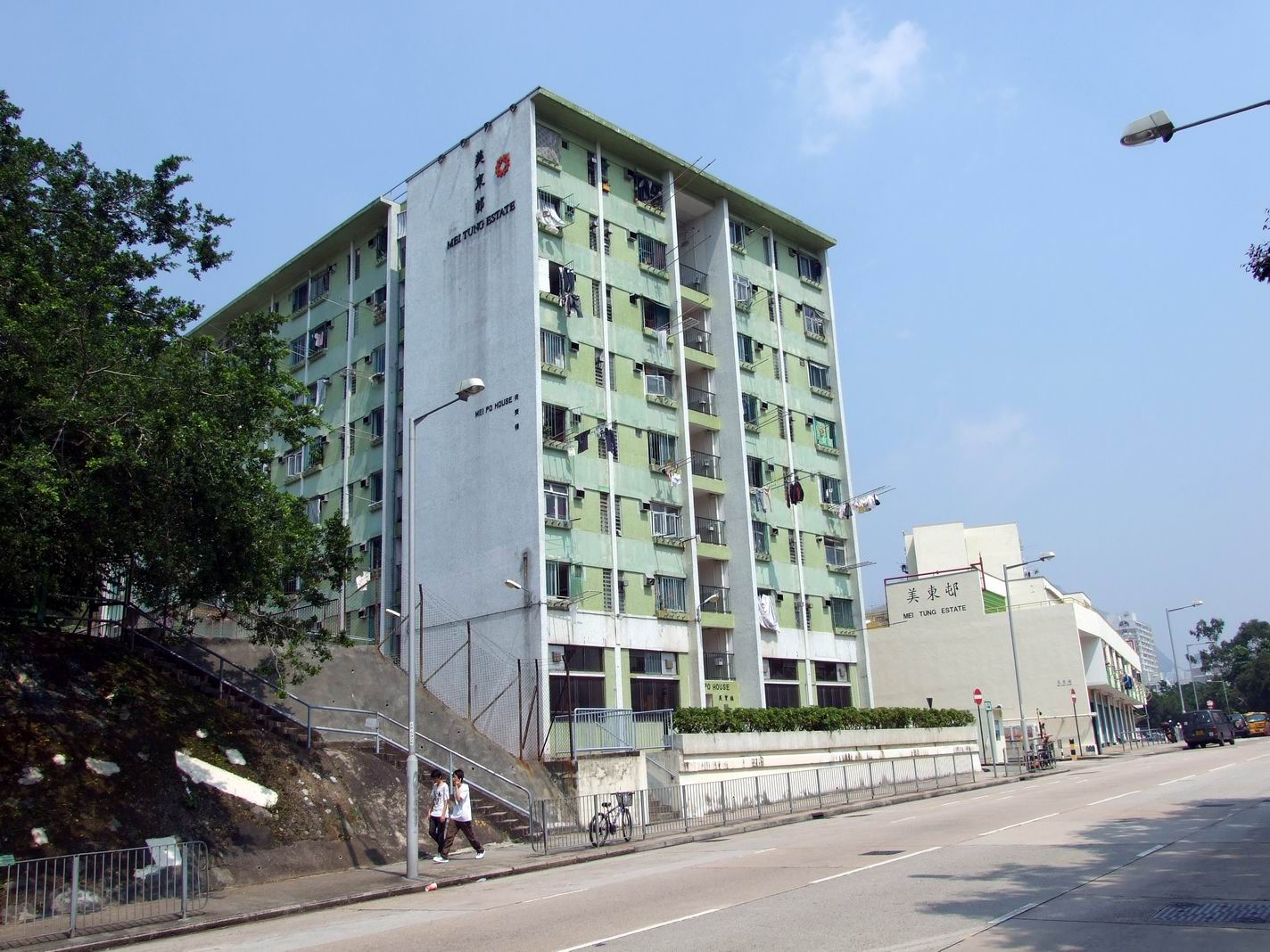
Mei Po House

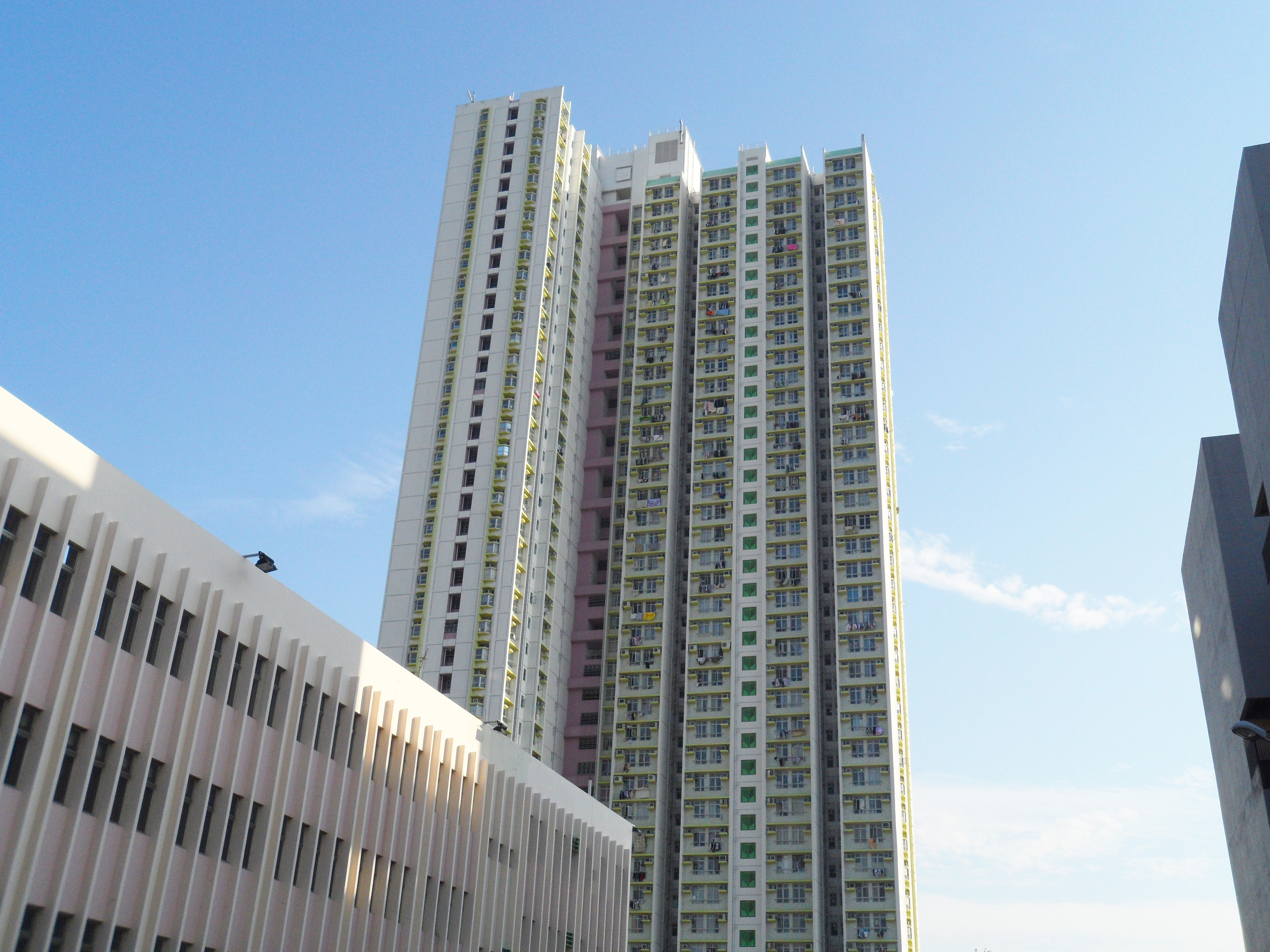
Mei Yan House

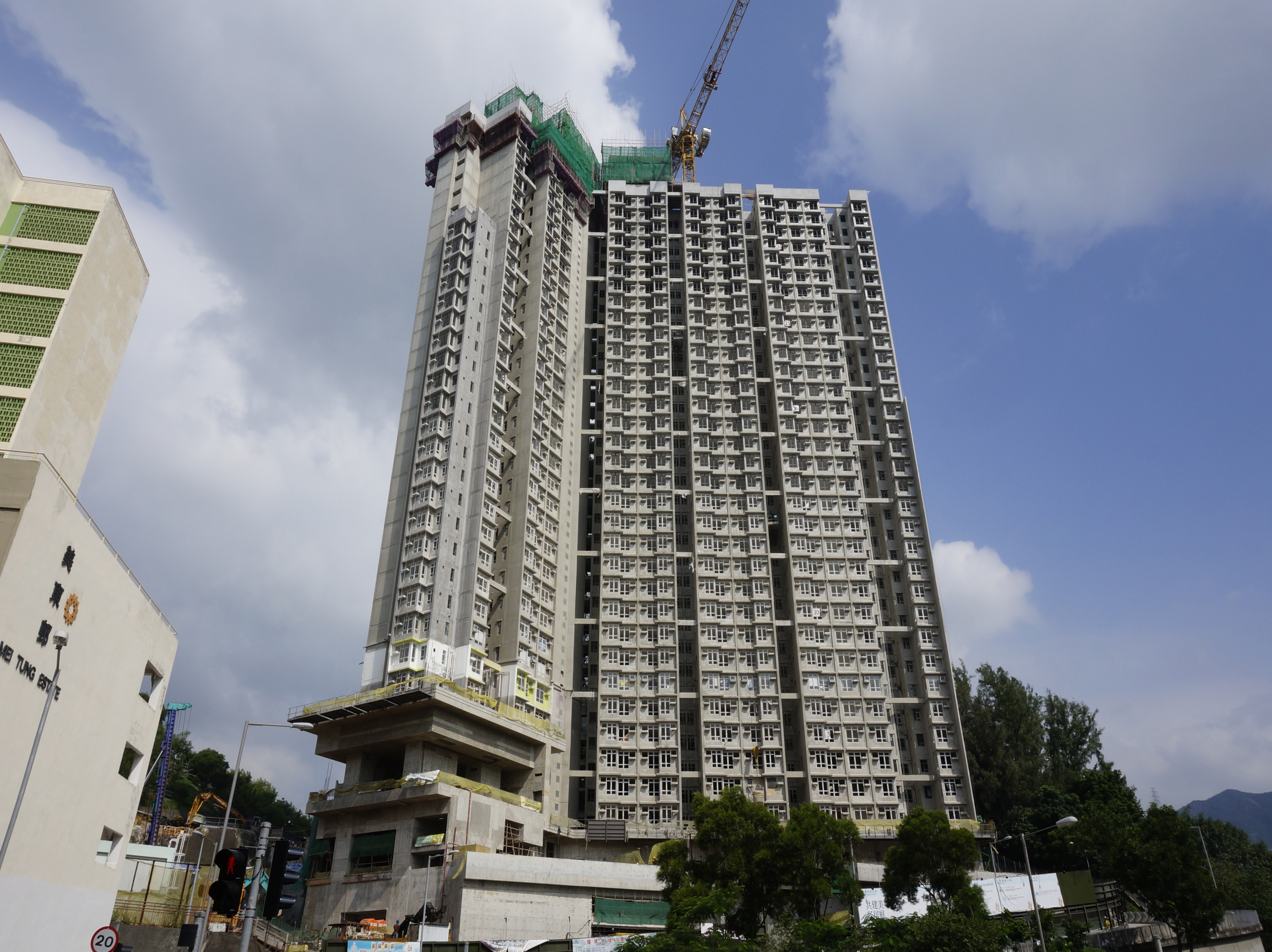
Mei Tak House, under construction

== Tin Ma Court ==
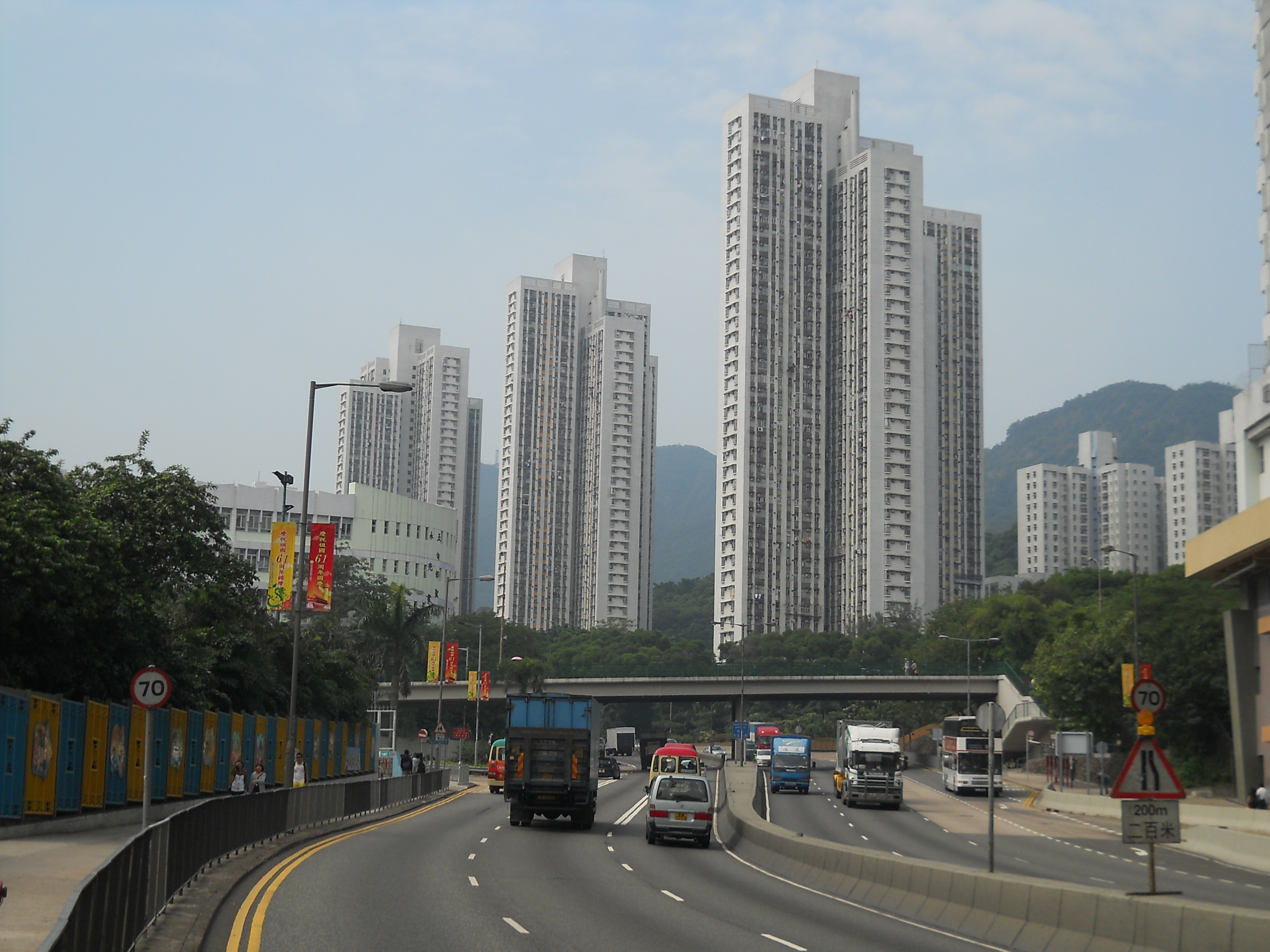
Tin Ma Court

Tin Ma Court (Chinese: 天馬苑) is a Home Ownership Scheme court in Wong Tai Sin, near Lung Cheung Road and Chuk Yuen Road. It has 5 blocks built in 1986.

Name	Type	Completion
Chun Sing House	Windmill	1986
Chun Wai House	Windmill	1986
Chun Fei House	Windmill	1986
Chun On House	Windmill	1986
Chun Hong House	Windmill	1986

Tin Ma Court is in Primary One Admission (POA) School Net 43. Within the school net are multiple aided schools (operated independently but funded with government money) and Wong Tai Sin Government Primary School.

== Tin Wang Court ==
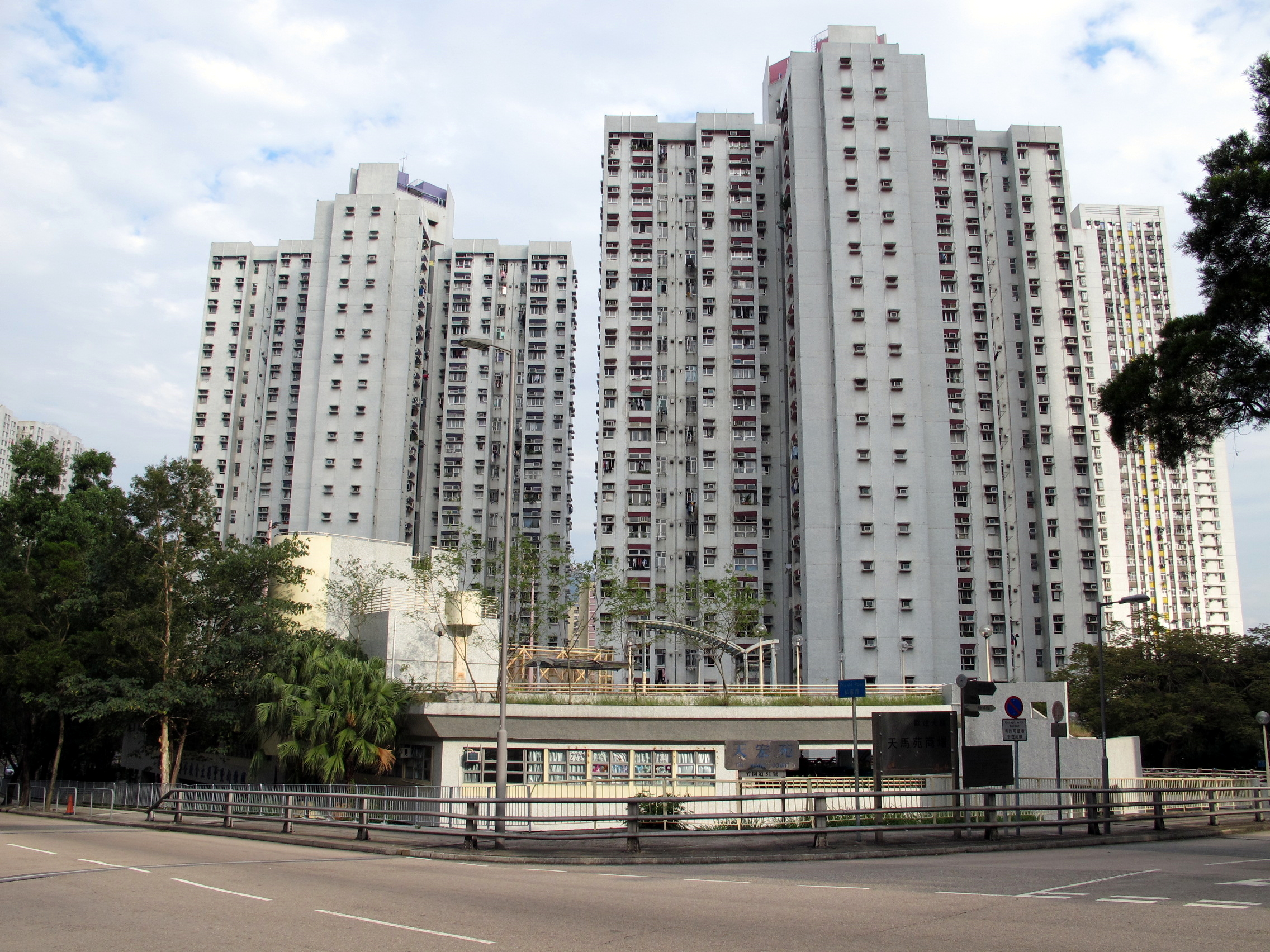
Tin Wang Court

Tin Wang Court (Chinese: 天宏苑) is a Home Ownership Scheme court in Wong Tai Sin, near Tin Ma Court. It has 3 blocks built in 1992.

Name	Type	Completion
Wang King House	NCB (Ver.1984)	1992
Wang Yuen House	NCB (Ver.1984)	1992
Wang Mei House	NCB (Ver.1984)	1992

== Tsui Chuk Garden ==
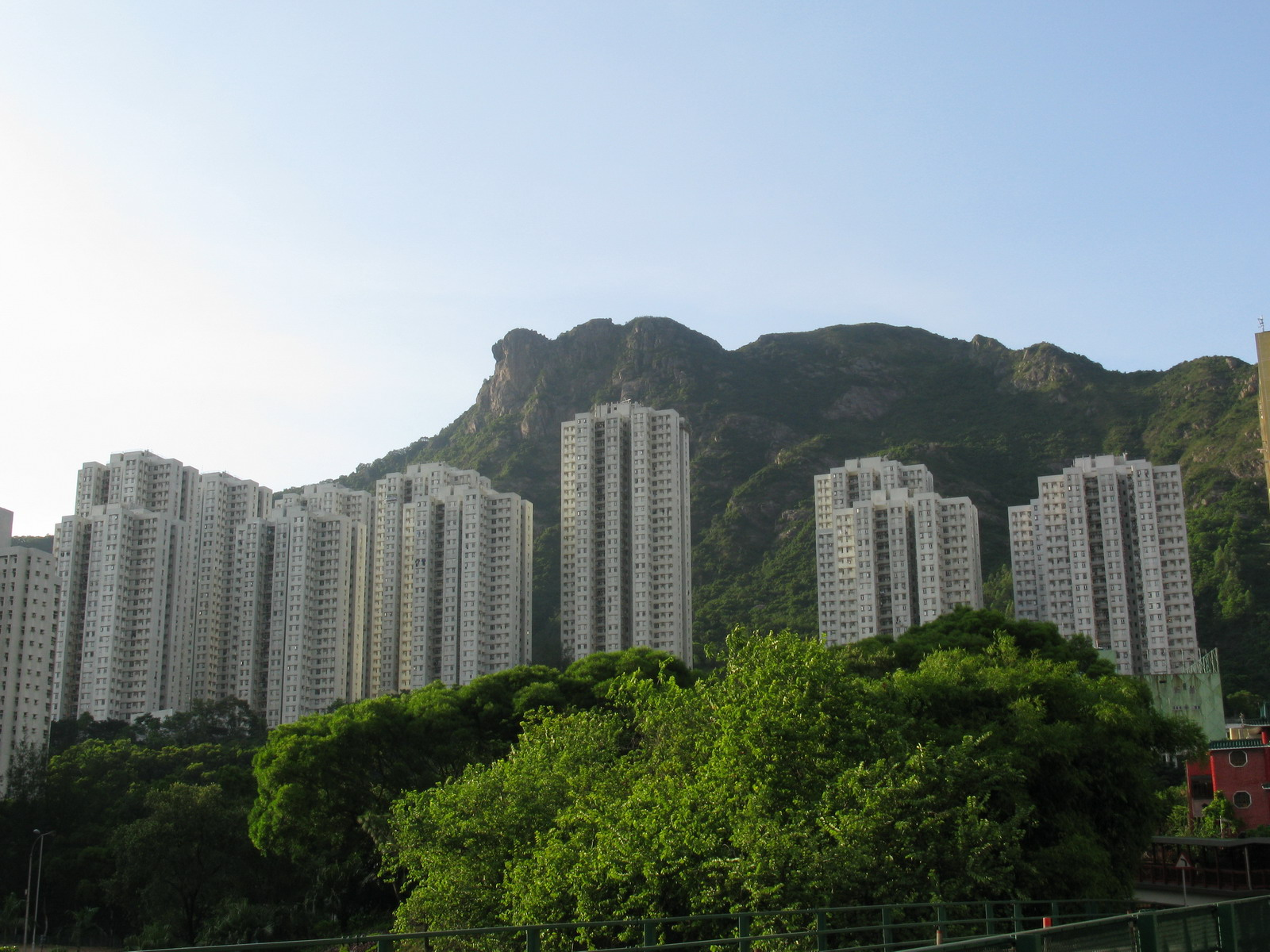
Tsui Chuk Garden with Lion Rock in the background.

Tsui Chuk Garden (Chinese: 翠竹花園) is a Home Ownership Scheme and Private Sector Participation Scheme estate in Wong Tai Sin, Kowloon, Hong Kong, adjacent to Lion Rock. It consists of 14 residential buildings built in 1989 (Phase 1 and 2, Block 1 to 12) and 1991 (Phase 3, Block 13 and 14) respectively. There is a bus terminus in the estate, which has a KMB bus route to MTR Wong Tai Sin station.

Name	Type	Completion
Block 1	PSPS	1989
Block 2	PSPS	1989
Block 3	PSPS	1989
Block 4	PSPS	1989
Block 5	PSPS	1989
Block 6	PSPS	1989
Block 7	PSPS	1989
Block 8	PSPS	1989
Block 9	PSPS	1989
Block 10	PSPS	1989
Block 11	PSPS	1989
Block 12	PSPS	1989
Block 13	PSPS	1991
Block 14	PSPS	1991

== Tung Tau Estate ==
Tung Tau Estate (Chinese: 東頭邨) is a public housing estate and Tenants Purchase Scheme estate at the south of Wong Tai Sin. It is divided into Tung Tau (I) Estate (Chinese: 東頭(一)邨) and Tung Tau (II) Estate (Chinese: 東頭(二)邨). Tung Tau (I) Estate has only one resettlement block, Block 22, built in 1965. Tung Tau (II) Estate has other 20 blocks built after its redevelopment in the 1980s and 1990s.

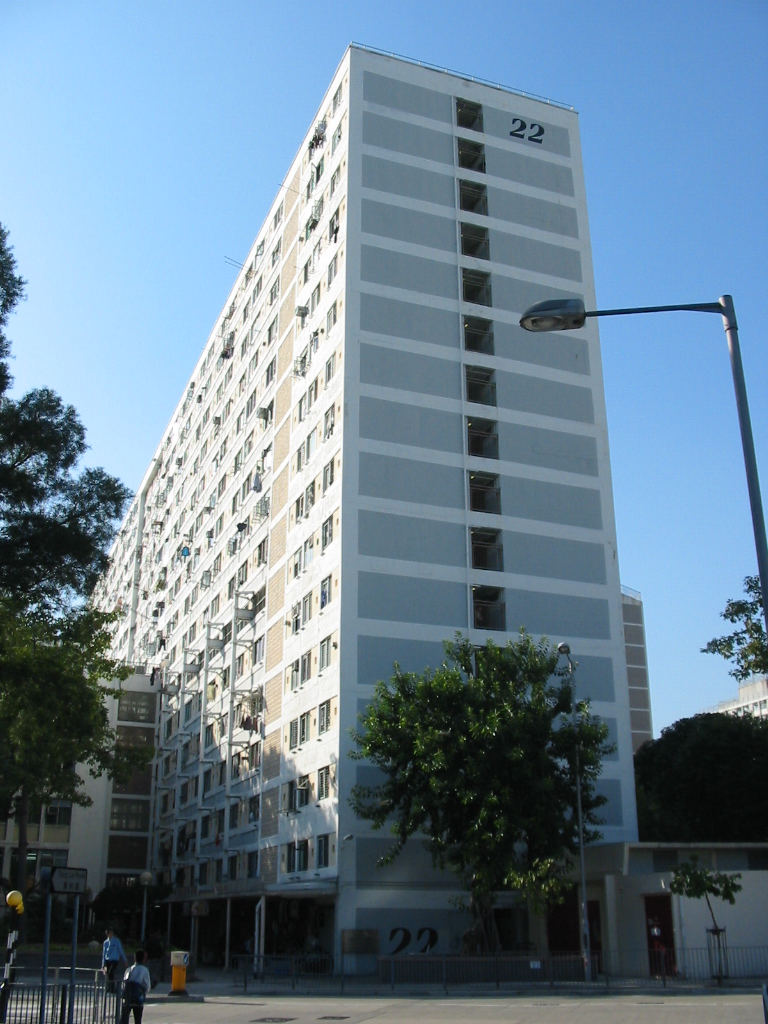
Block 22, Tung Tau Estate

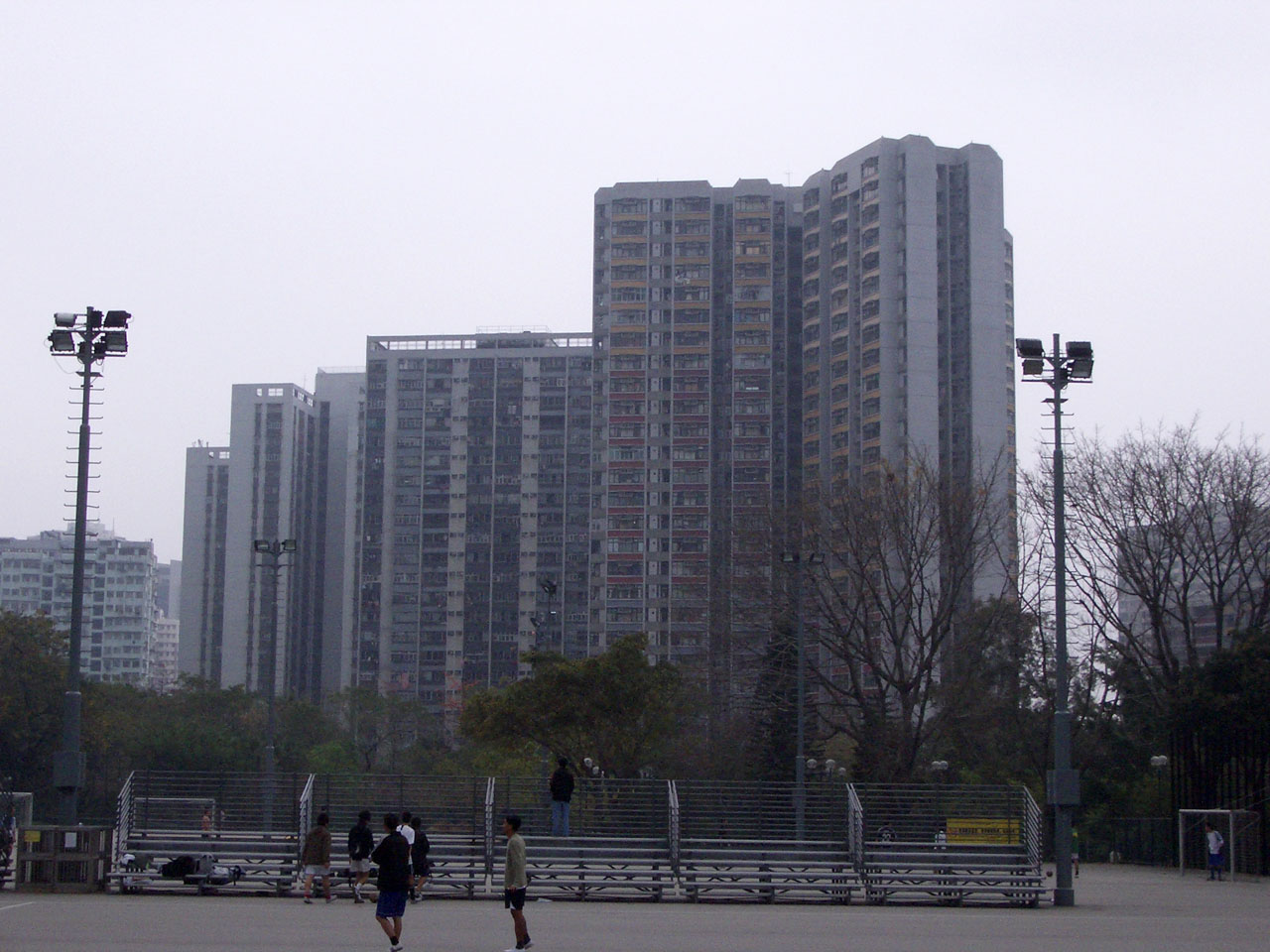
Tung Tau (II) Estate

== Tung Wui Estate ==
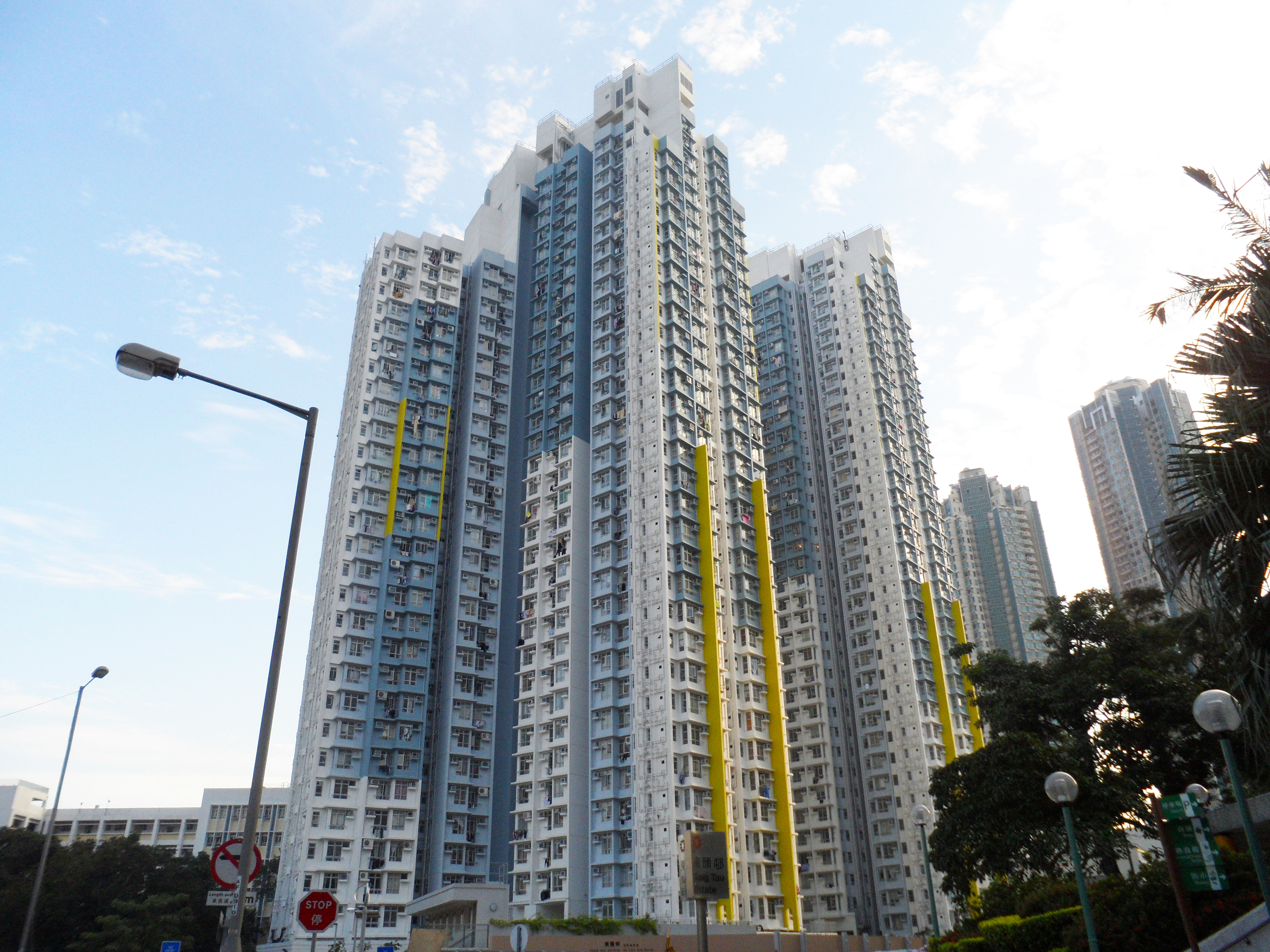
Tung Wui Estate

Tung Wui Estate (Chinese: 東匯邨), also known as Tung Tau Estate Phase 9, consists of two residential blocks completed in 2012 providing a total of 1,333 residential units with sizes ranging from 14 to 39 square metres .

=== Houses ===
English name	Chinese name	Type	Storeys	Completion
Wui Yan House	匯仁樓	Non-standard block (Y-shaped)	38	2013
Wui Sum House	匯心樓	Non-standard block (Y-shaped)	34	2013
Wui Chi House	匯智樓	Non-standard block (Other Type)	29	2020

== Lower Wong Tai Sin Estate ==
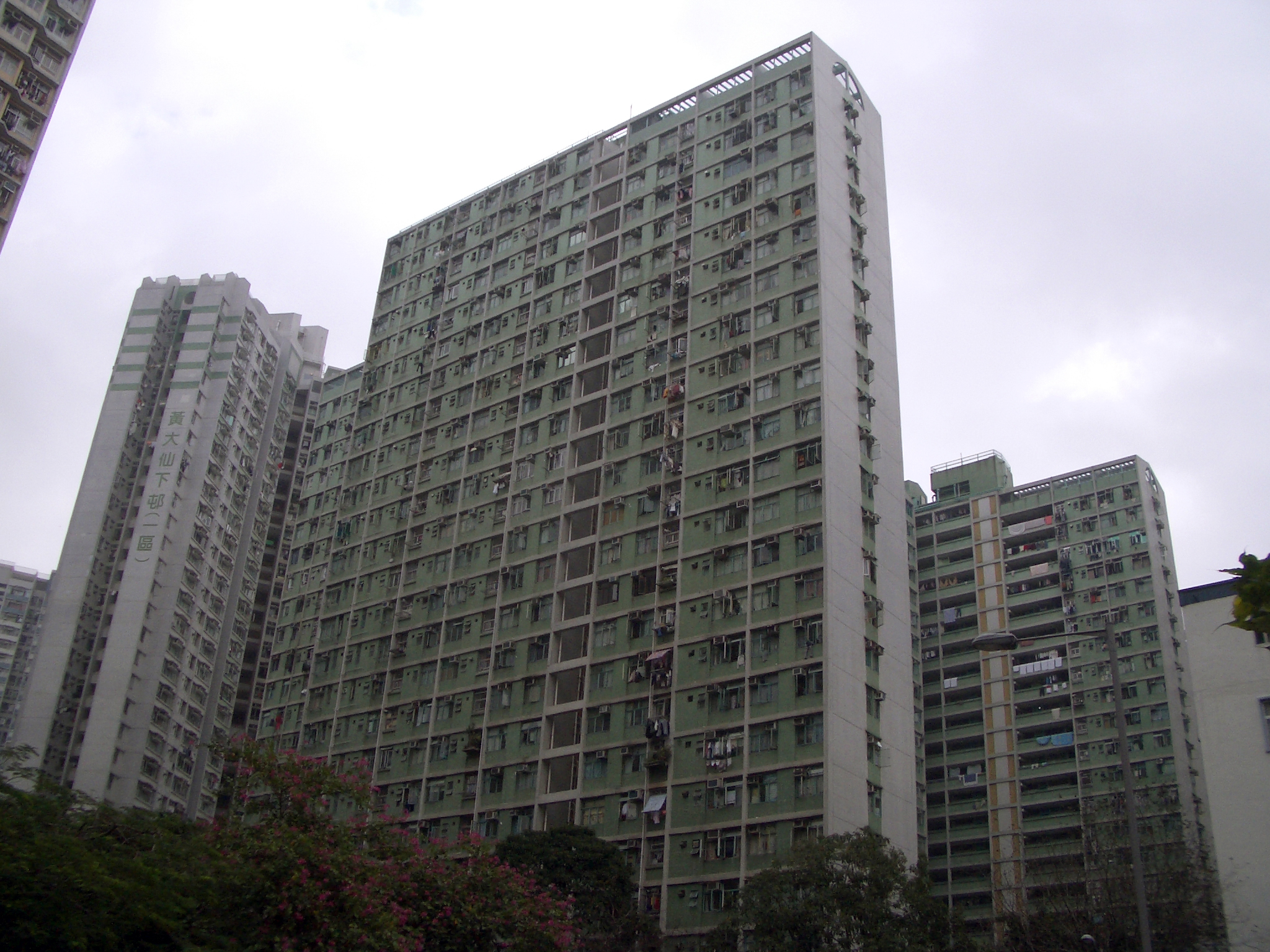
Lower Wong Tai Sin (I) Estate

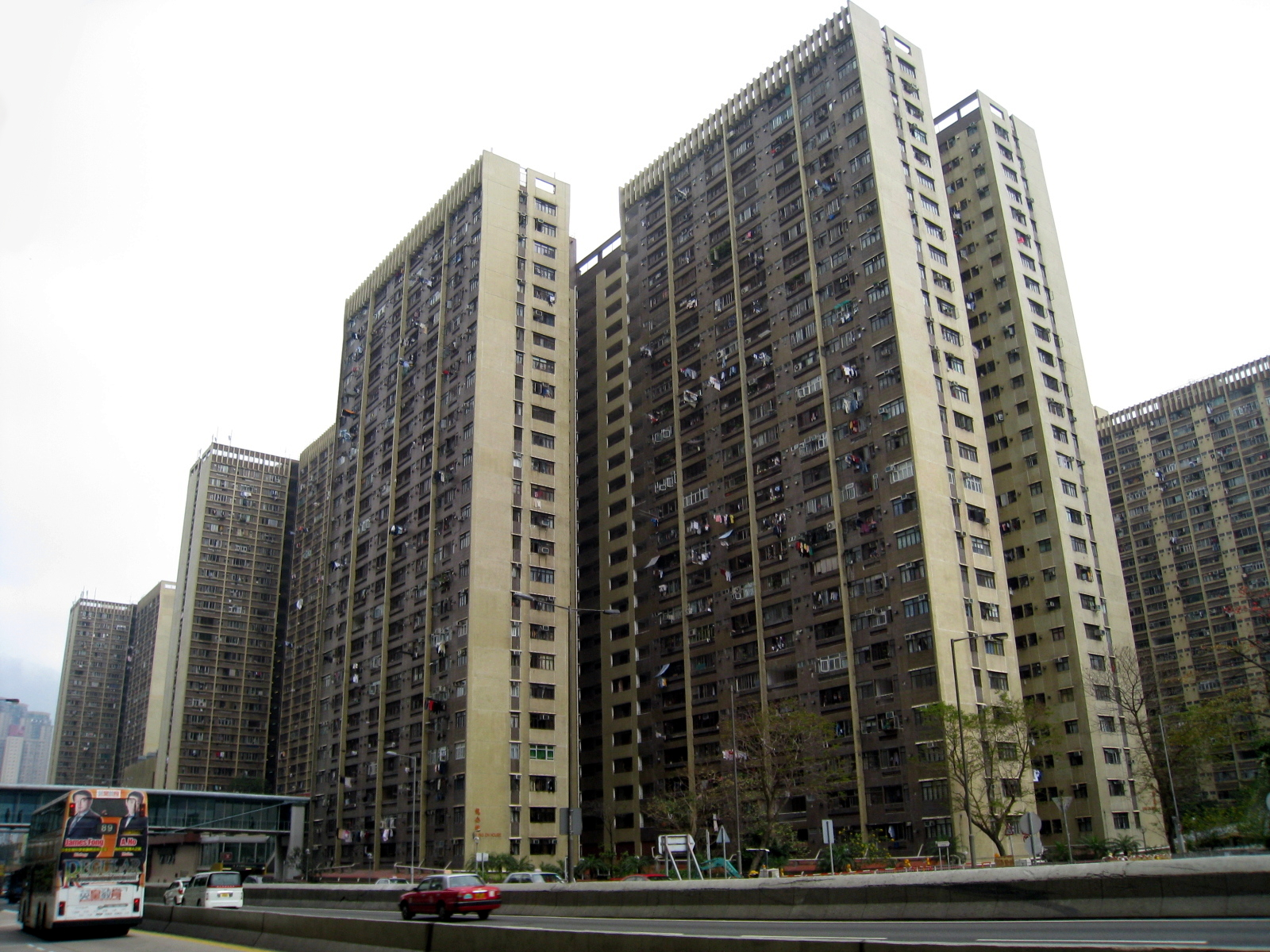
Lower Wong Tai Sin (II) Estate

Lower Wong Tai Sin Estate (Chinese: 黃大仙下邨) is a public housing estate and Tenants Purchase Scheme estate in Wong Tai Sin, along the south of Lung Cheung Road, near Wong Tai Sin Temple and MTR Wong Tai Sin station. It is divided into Lower Wong Tai Sin (I) Estate (Chinese: 黃大仙下(一)邨) and Lower Wong Tai Sin (II) Estate (Chinese: 黃大仙下(二)邨). The estate now consists of totally 24 blocks built between the 1980s and 1990s.

== Upper Wong Tai Sin Estate ==
Upper Wong Tai Sin Estate (Chinese: 黃大仙上邨) is a public housing estates in Wong Tai Sin, along the north of Lung Cheung Road, near Wong Tai Sin Temple and MTR Wong Tai Sin station. It consists of 8 blocks built in 2000 and 2009 respectively, and it is now under redevelopment.

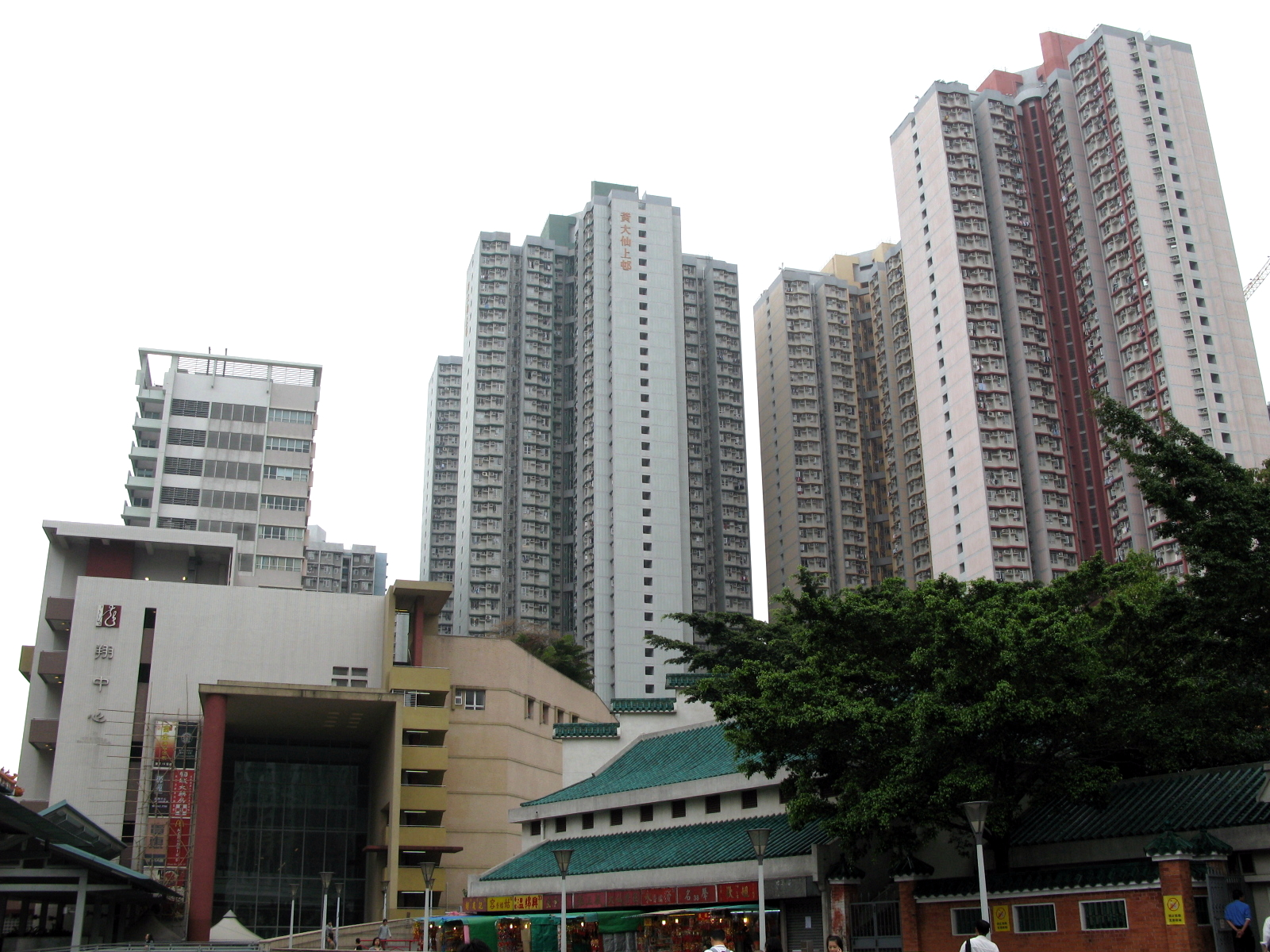
Upper Wong Tai Sin Estate

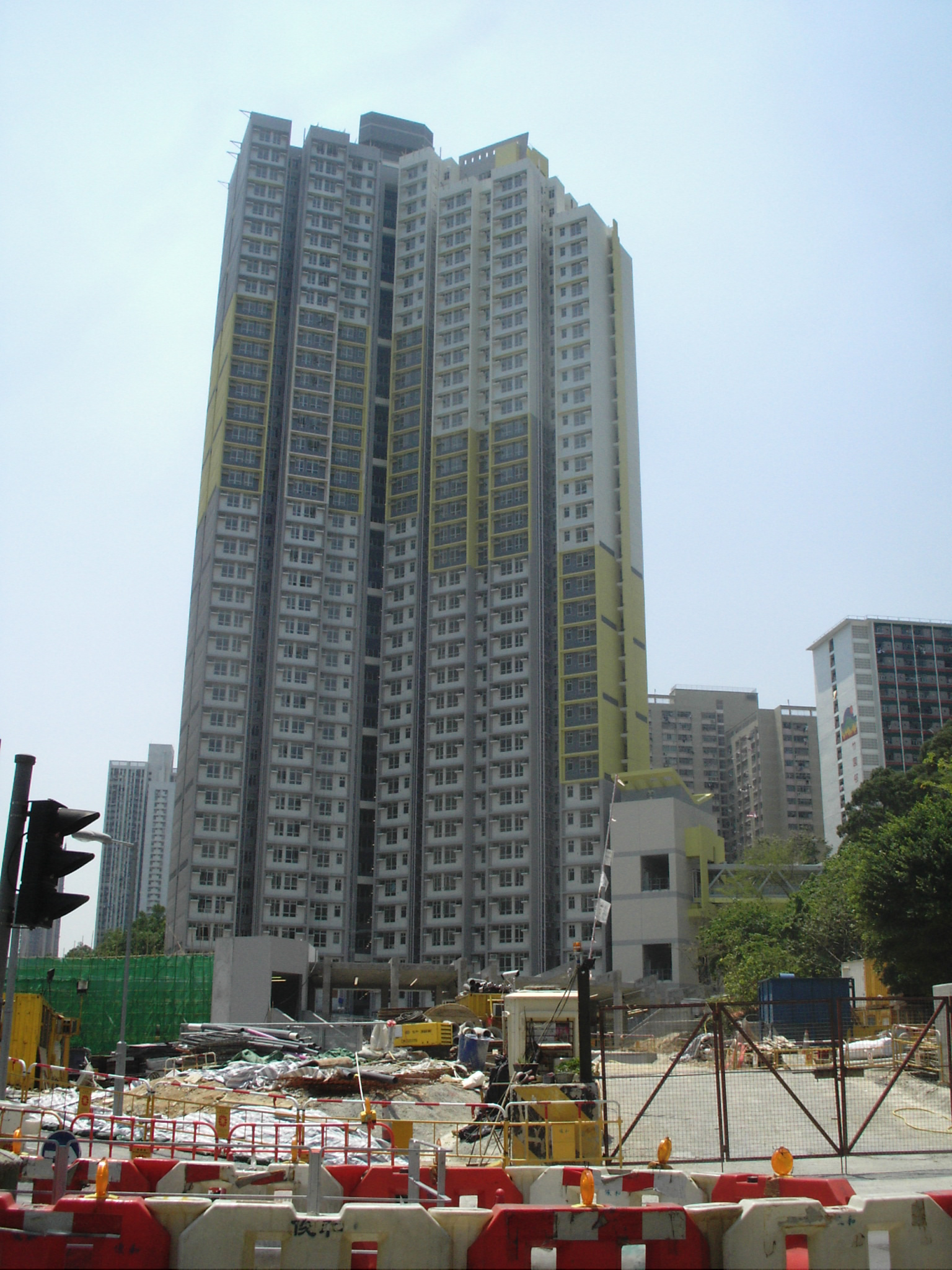
Wing Sin House, Upper Wong Tai Sin Estate

== See also ==
- List of public housing estates in Hong Kong
