= Chuk Yuen (Wong Tai Sin District) =

Village and area in New Kowloon, Hong Kong

Coordinates: 22.3458°N 114.1957°E

- Traditional Chinese: 竹園
- Simplified Chinese: 竹园
Transcriptions
Standard Mandarin
- Hanyu Pinyin: Zhúyuán
Yue: Cantonese
- Jyutping: zuk1 jyun4*2

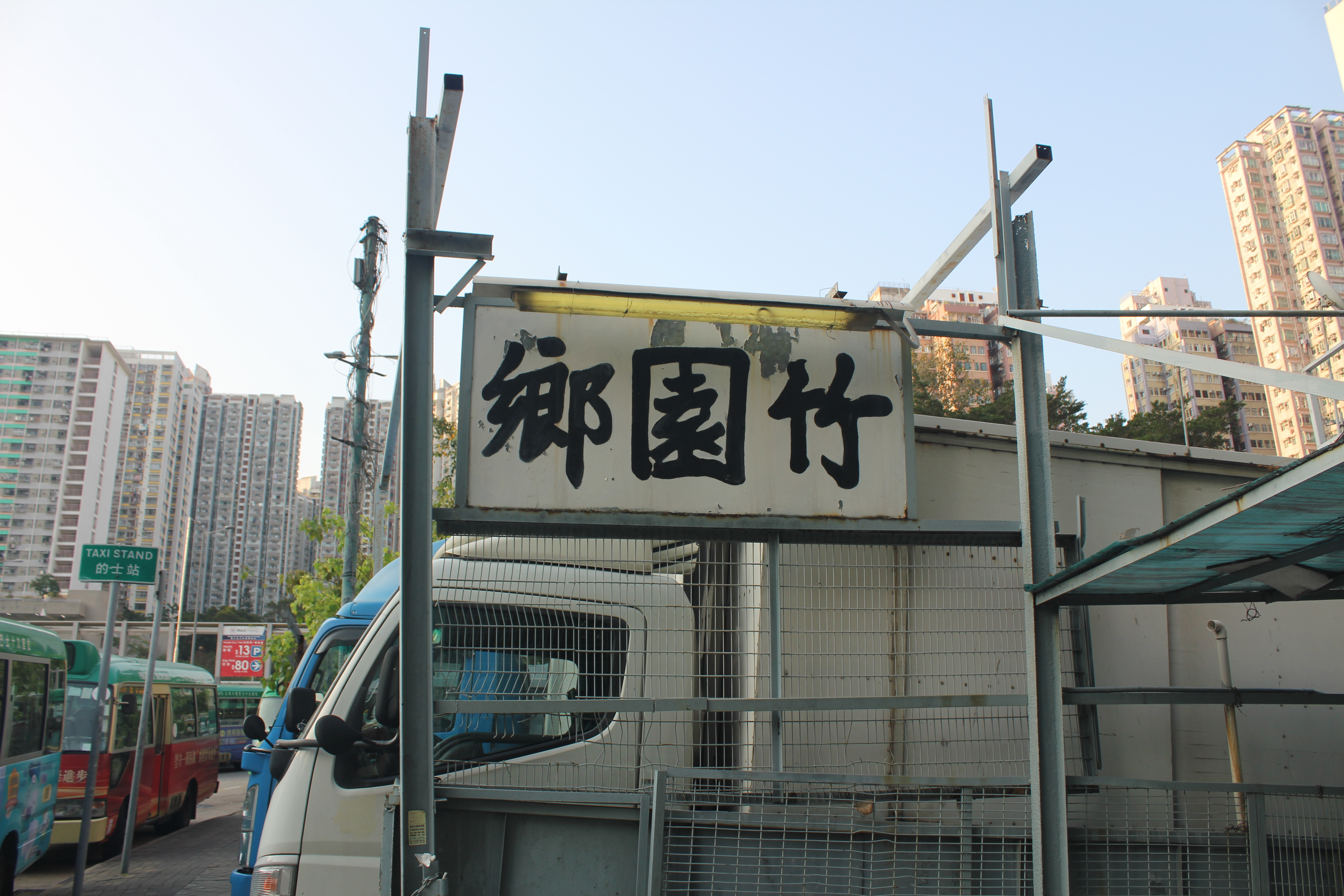
Chuk Yuen Village sign in 2021

Chuk Yuen (Chinese: 竹園; lit. 'bamboo garden') or Chuk Un was a village and an area in New Kowloon of Hong Kong. The area located in the approximate area of present-day Wong Tai Sin. The name now also refers to two public housing estates, Chuk Yuen North and Chuk Yuen South Estates.

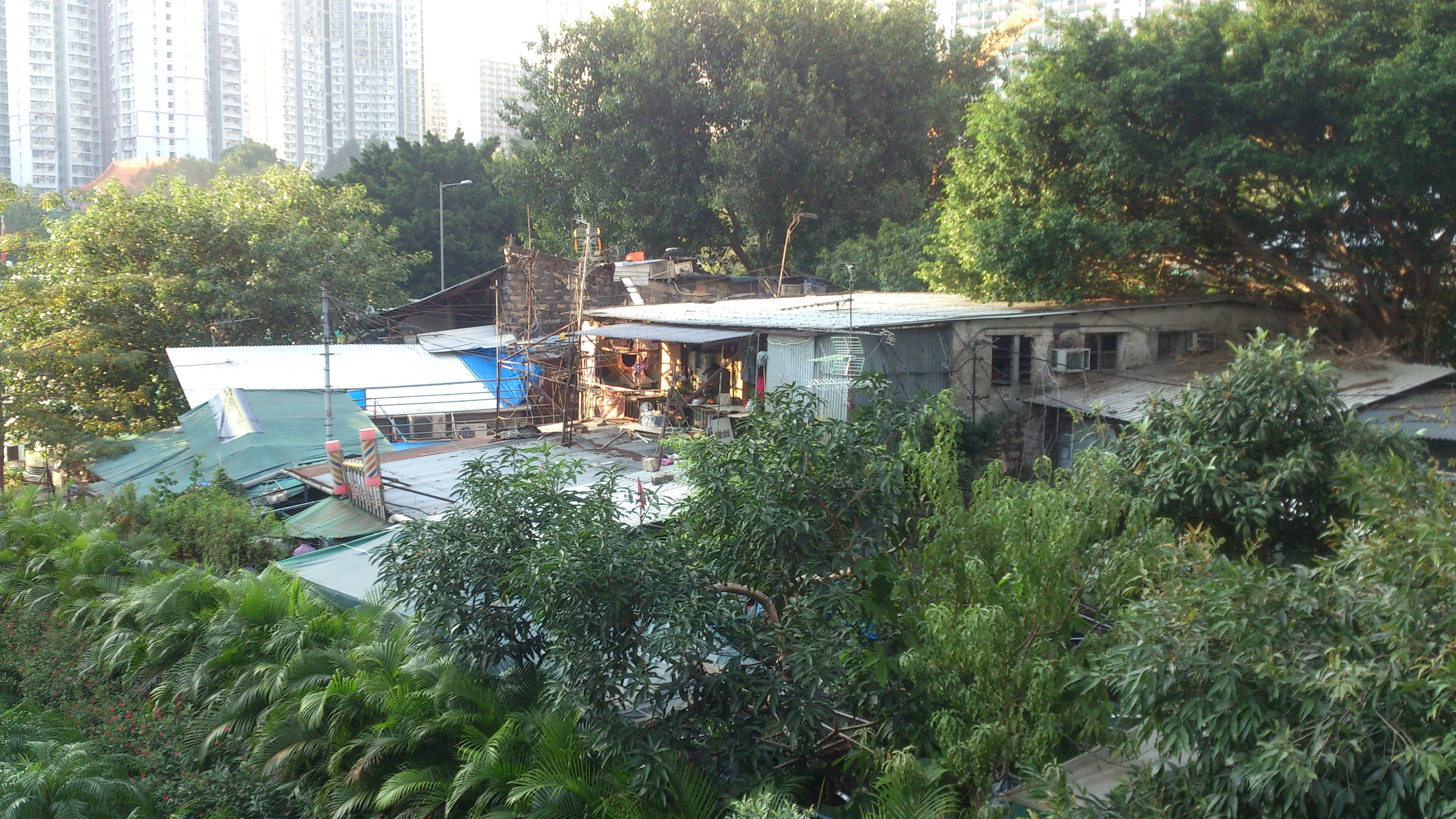
Chuk Yuen United Village in 2014

Due to redevelopments starting from 1957, the only surviving part of historic Chuk Yuen is at Chuk Yuen United Village, at the junction of Shatin Pass Road and Lung Cheung Road.

== History ==
The original village of Chuk Yuen was centered approximately around the current Wong Tai Sin Fire Station, beside Shatin Pass Road. The village was established in the late 17th century and contained a mix of clans, the majority of which are the Lins' (林), the Lis' (李), and the Kos' (古). During early British rule of New Kowloon, Shatin Pass Road was a road from a point from Kai Tak Airport to Shatin Pass in the north ridge via villages of Po Kong and Chuk Yuen.

A forest of bamboo surrounded the village, and the village's name is derived therefrom - Chuk Yuen means bamboo garden in Chinese language. A river from the range north ran by the village west emptying into Kowloon Bay via Po Kong.

In 1921, a Taoist priest built Wong Tai Sin Temple west of the village, and a Taoist group Sik Sik Yuen (嗇色園) was established to manage the temple at the same time.

Before the 1950s, the Chuk Yuen area surrounding the village was mainly used for agriculture and raising livestock, with a small population of around 100-200 residents living in the Village. The area from Wong Tai Sin Police Station to Wong Tai Sin Temple was an agricultural field, with a deep creek cutting through today's Temple Mall. Private dairy farms were also common, with a few in the area of present-day Fung Wong Chuen and Tsz Lok Estate (Fung Wong Hill in the past), and next to Wong Tai Sin Temple. Within Chuk Yuen Village, there were also industries such as the Lee Dai Tung Pig House, Kwong Lung On Cloth-dying yard (廣隆安漂染廠), and Wing Yuen Silk Factory (永源絲織廠), all of which resides in the modern day Chuk Yuen United Village.

After World War II and the years around the Chinese Civil War, a large influx of refugees rushed into Hong Kong and built their home on the hill sides. In 1954, the Hong Kong Government zoned the hilly area north of the temple as Chuk Yuen Resettlement Area, this 29-acre area which covered present-day Chuk Yuen North Estate, Chuk Yuen South Estate and Upper Wong Tai Sin Estate accommodated 1700 various dwellings, over 70% which were self built wooden huts. Utilities in the area were built by various groups including the settlers of Chuk Yuen, the Hong Kong Government, the Church World Service and other Catholic organizations. For example, settlers made stairs and footpaths that connected different parts of the area; the Hong Kong Government constructed 20 public latrine buildings and two markets; various religious organizations provided a clinic, a primary school, a family life centre, and more.

In 1956, the government decided to relocate the residents of squatters and Chuk Yuen Village in the resettlement area to high-rise residential blocks. Two Wong Tai Sin Estates, "Upper" and "Lower", were built. A special block with better in-house facilities was constructed for indigenous villagers. Originally, the Wong Tai Sin temple was threatened as it was within the development project. However, the Tung Wah Group of Hospitals successfully persuaded the government to preserve the temple.

The housing project of the two Wong Tai Sin Estates were completed in early 1960s. The name of Wong Tai Sin gradually gained popularity over Chuk Yuen, though the temple continues to use the address of No. 2 Chuk Yuen Village.

Later, the northern part of the settlement area was replaced with the Chuk Yuen North and Chuk Yuen South estates. The Chuk Yuen Bus Terminus at Chuk Yuen Road, between two estates, hosts many bus routes to other areas of Hong Kong.

Nowadays, Chuk Yuen commonly refers to the estates, the bus terminus, and surroundings.

In the 2019 and 2020 policy addresses, the chief executive stated that the government intends to take back possession of the remaining Chuk Yuen United Village and to redevelop the land into high-density public housing.

== Notable buildings ==
- The cloth factory Kwong Lung On, founded during the 1930s, and Wing Yuen Silk Factory, founded shortly after World War II, were both managed by the Tam family who still live in Chuk Yuen United Village today. In its heyday, the dual factories had a workforce of at least 40 people, with a dedicated worker's dormitories and canteen. They were well known among locals, and in the 1950s, their products were regarded highly by the name "Wong Tai Sin Cloth" (黃大仙綢). Because of the business, the Tam family became wealthy within the area, and managed to apply for water pipes, electricity, and telephone from the government. In the early 1950s the factory was the only place with a telephone in the entire village.
- Chuk Yuen Children's Reception Centre, at Fung Wong San Tsuen, a temporary home for children when their parents are not suitable to take care of them.
- The Salvation Army Chuk Yuen Corps was set up on 26 June 1956, as a vocational centre for youngsters with a primary school for children. It was opened by the then Governor of Hong Kong Sir Alexander Grantham and about one hundred distinguished guests attended.
