= Wong Tai Sin, Hong Kong =

Area in Wong Tai Sin District, New Kowloon, Hong Kong

Coordinates: 22°20′29.9″N 114°11′34.9″E

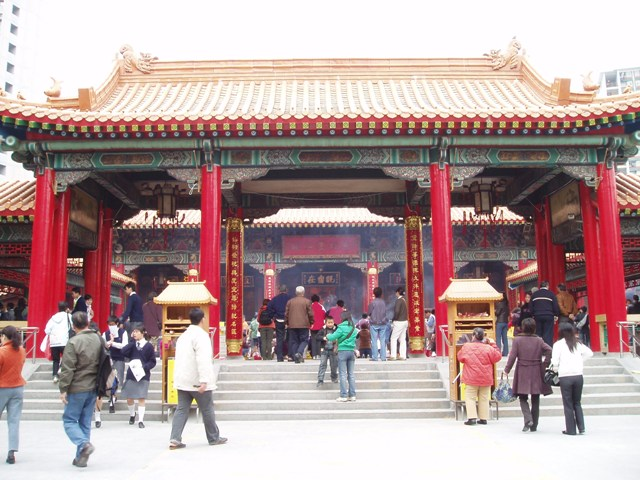
- The famous Wong Tai Sin Temple, dedicated to Wong Tai Sin. Everyday Hong Kong people flock to this temple to wish for good health and prosperity.
- Traditional Chinese: 黃大仙
- Simplified Chinese: 黄大仙
- Literal meaning: Big Yellow Immortal
Transcriptions
Standard Mandarin
- Hanyu Pinyin: Huáng Dàxian
Yue: Cantonese
- Jyutping: wong4 daai6 sin1

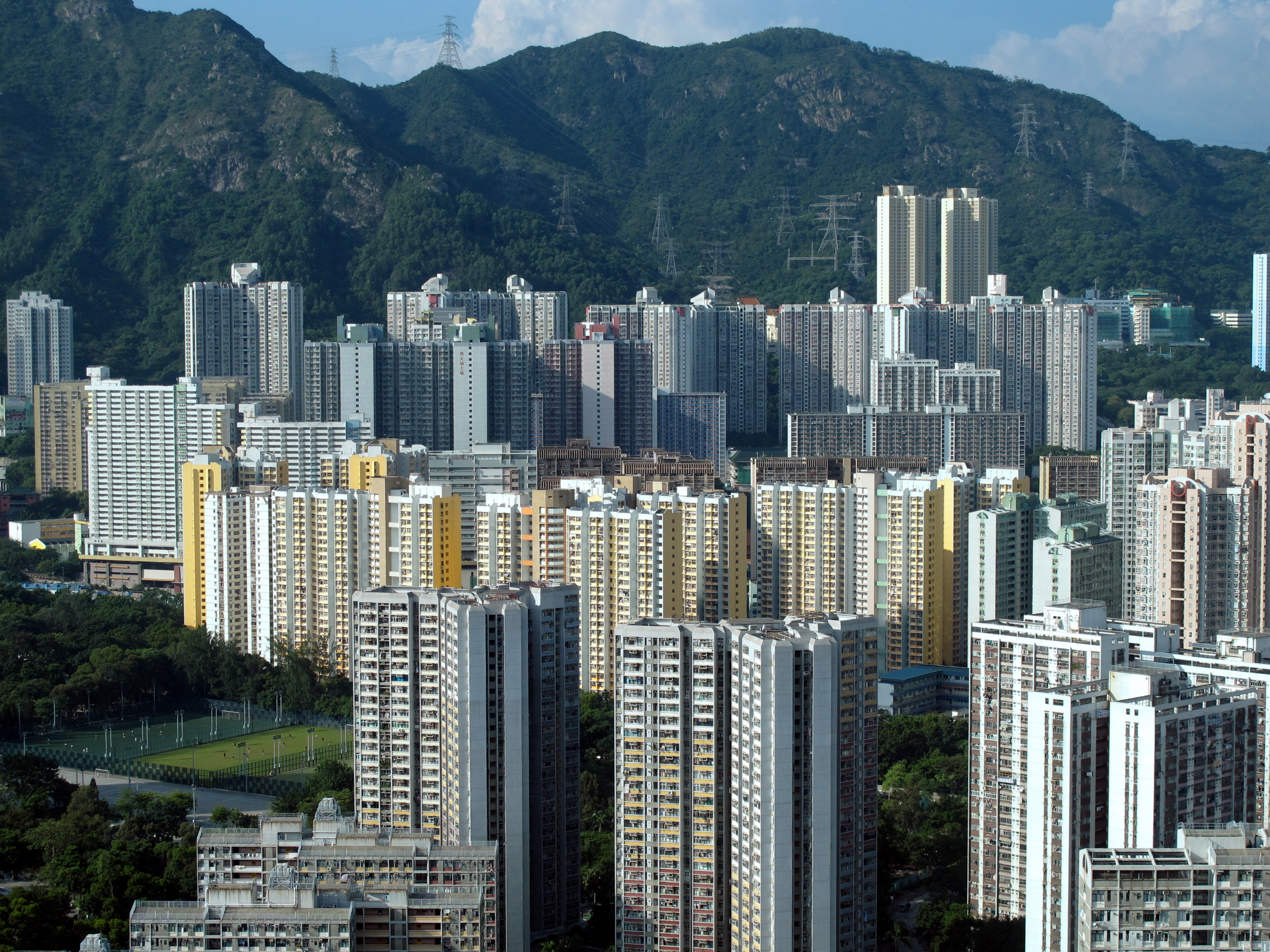
Several public housing estates located in Wong Tai Sin

Wong Tai Sin is an area in Wong Tai Sin District, New Kowloon, Hong Kong. The area was named after the Wong Tai Sin Temple.

The area was previously known as Chuk Yuen or Chuk Un, prior to the intake of two Wong Tai Sin Estates. The populace of the estates, the prosperity of Wong Tai Sin Temple and the completion of Wong Tai Sin MTR station gradually eclipses its former name.

== Location ==
Wong Tai Sin is surrounded by northeast Tsz Wan Shan, east Diamond Hill, south San Po Kong, south west Tung Tau and west Wang Tau Hom. Lion Rock is located north west of Wong Tai Sin.

== History ==
For history before the completion Wong Tai Sin Estates in 1960s, see Chuk Yuen.

== Features ==
Public housing estates in the area include Upper Wong Tai Sin Estate, Lower Wong Tai Sin Estate, Chuk Yuen North Estate and Chuk Yuen South Estate. Fung Wong San Tsuen is also considered part of Wong Tai Sin.

Two shopping centres, Temple Mall North (previously: Lung Cheung Mall) and Temple Mall South (previously: Wong Tai Sin Shopping Centre).

== Transport ==
The area of Wong Tai Sin is centre at the main road Lung Cheung Road which connects Kwun Tong Road at Ngau Chi Wan and Ching Cheung Road near Tai Wo Ping. The Wong Tai Sin station of MTR runs beneath the road.

== See also ==
- Nga Tsin Wai Tsuen, a walled village in the area.
- Public housing estates in Wong Tai Sin
