= Chuk Yuen Estate =

Public housing estate in Kowloon, Hong Kong

Coordinates: 22.3441°N 114.1927°E

- Traditional Chinese: 竹園邨
- Simplified Chinese: 竹园邨
- Cantonese Yale: jūk yùhn chyūn
- Literal meaning: bamboo garden estate
Transcriptions
Standard Mandarin
- Hanyu Pinyin: Zhúyuán Cūn
Yue: Cantonese
- Yale Romanization: jūk yùhn chyūn
- Jyutping: zuk1 jyun4 cyun1

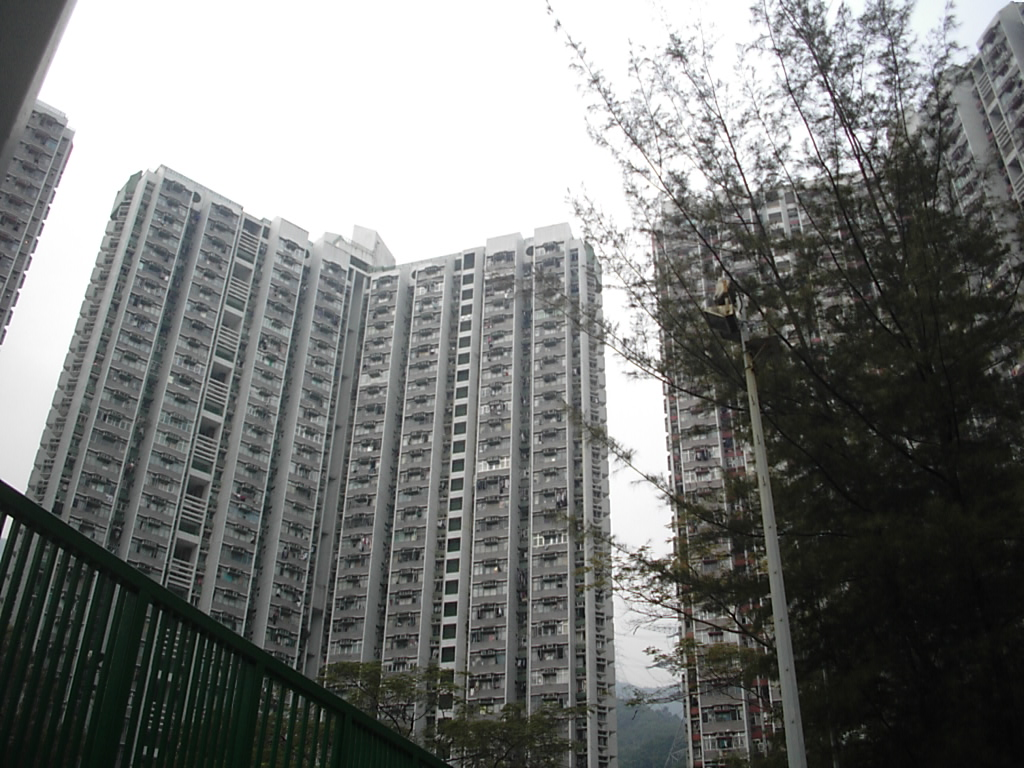
Chuk Yuen North Estate

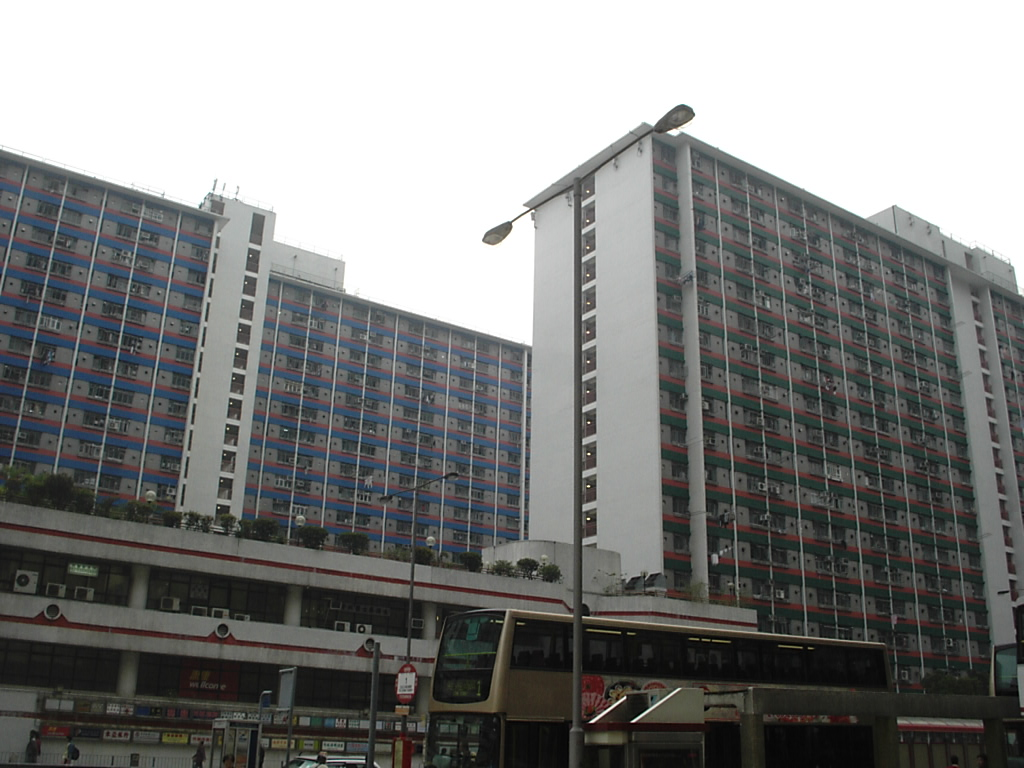
Chuk Yuen South Estate

Chuk Yuen Estate (Chinese: 竹園邨) is a public housing estate in Kowloon, Hong Kong, located north of Wong Tai Sin and underneath Lion Rock. Its site was formerly the Chuk Yuen Resettlement Area.

It is divided into Chuk Yuen (North) Estate (竹園(北)邨) and Chuk Yuen (South) Estate (竹園(南)邨). The two estates have eight blocks each, and were all built in the 1980s. In 1999, some of the flats were sold to tenants through the Tenants Purchase Scheme Phase 2.

At the centre of these buildings is a shopping mall, hosting a McDonald's, 7-Eleven, Circle K, three bakeries, a street market, Watsons, a dim sum restaurant, two supermarkets and a sports centre. Beside the mall are two parks: one with a fish pond and a waterfall and the other with basketball courts and football fields.

Pang Ching Court (鵬程苑) and Ying Fuk Court (盈福苑) fall under the Home Ownership Scheme courts near Chuk Yuen Estate, completed in 1991 and 2001 respectively. They each have one block.

== Houses ==
=== Chuk Yuen (South) Estate ===
| Name | Type | Completion |
|---|---|---|
| Fu Yuen House | Twin Tower | 1983 |
| Kwai Yuen House | Twin Tower | 1983 |
| Wing Yuen House | Twin Tower | 1983 |
| Nga Yuen House | Double H | 1985 |
| Lai Yuen House | Double H | 1985 |
| Wah Yuen House | Old Slab | 1985 |
| Sau Yuen House | Old Slab | 1985 |
| Chui Yuen House | Old Slab | 1986 |

=== Chuk Yuen (North) Estate ===
| Name | Type | Completion |
|---|---|---|
| Yung Yuen House | Trident 3 | 1987 |
| Cheung Yuen House | Trident 3 | 1987 |
| Tung Yuen House | Trident 3 | 1987 |
| Mui Yuen House | Trident 3 | 1987 |
| Chung Yuen House | Trident 3 | 1989 |
| Pak Yuen House | Trident 3 | 1989 |
| Wai Yuen House | Trident 3 | 1989 |
| Toa Yuen House | Trident 3 | 1989 |

=== Pang Ching Court ===
| Name | Type | Completion |
|---|---|---|
| Pang Ching Court | Trident 3 | 1991 |

=== Ying Fuk Court ===
| Name | Type | Completion |
|---|---|---|
| Ying Fuk Court | NCB (Ver.1984) | 2001 |

== Education ==
The Chuk Yuen area is in Primary One Admission (POA) School Net 43. Within the school net are multiple aided schools (operated independently but funded with government money) and Wong Tai Sin Government Primary School.

== See also ==
- Chuk Yuen
- Public housing estates in Wong Tai Sin
