= Upper Wong Tai Sin Estate =

Public housing estate in Wong Tai Sin, Hong Kong

Coordinates: 22.3426°N 114.1918°E

- Traditional Chinese: 黃大仙上邨
- Simplified Chinese: 黄大仙上邨
- Cantonese Yale: wòhng daaih sīn séuhng chyūn
Transcriptions
Standard Mandarin
- Hanyu Pinyin: Huángdàxiān Shàng Cūn
Yue: Cantonese
- Yale Romanization: wòhng daaih sīn séuhng chyūn
- Jyutping: wong4 daai6 sin1 soeng5 cyun1

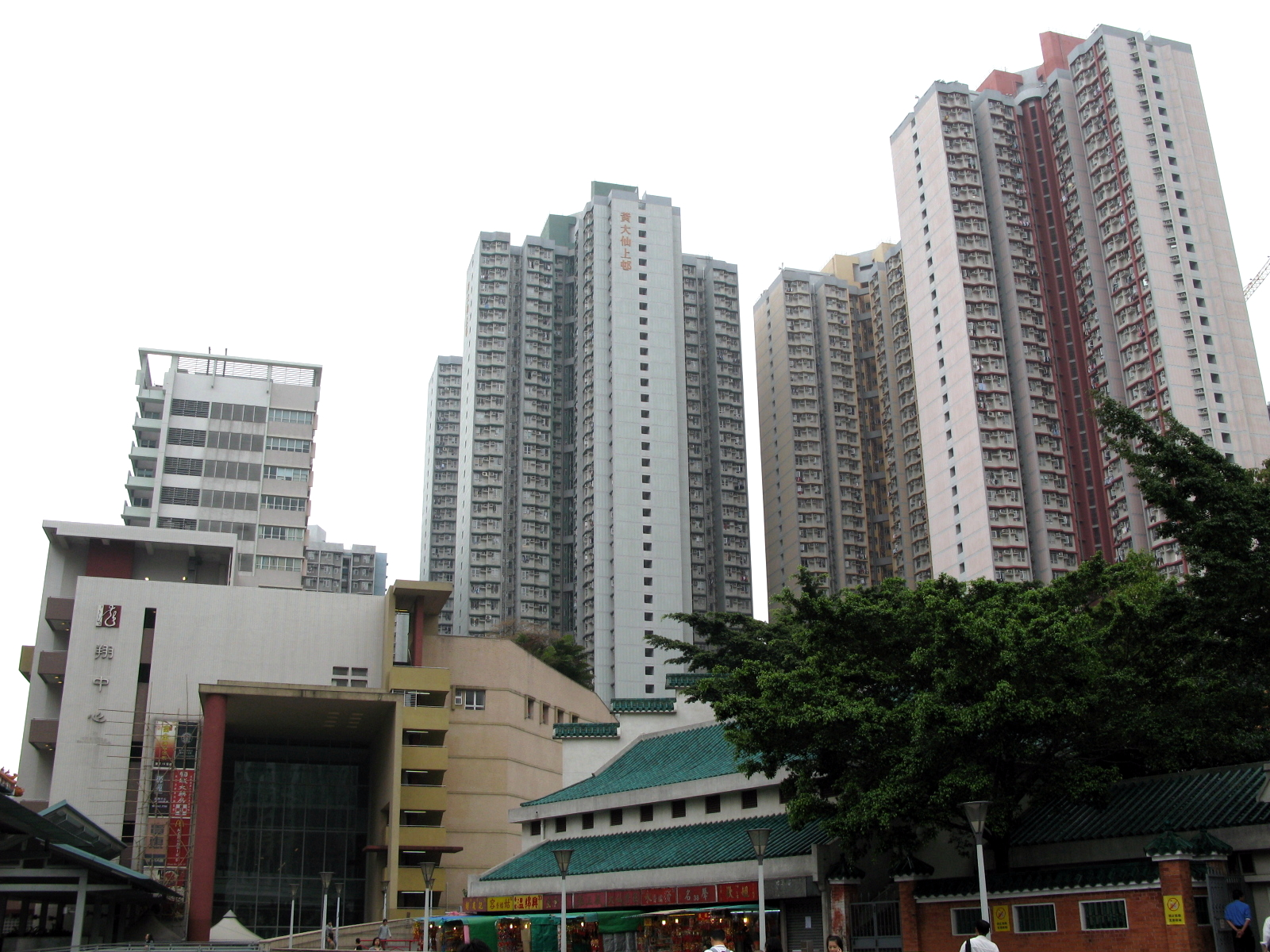
Upper Wong Tai Sin Estate in April 2008

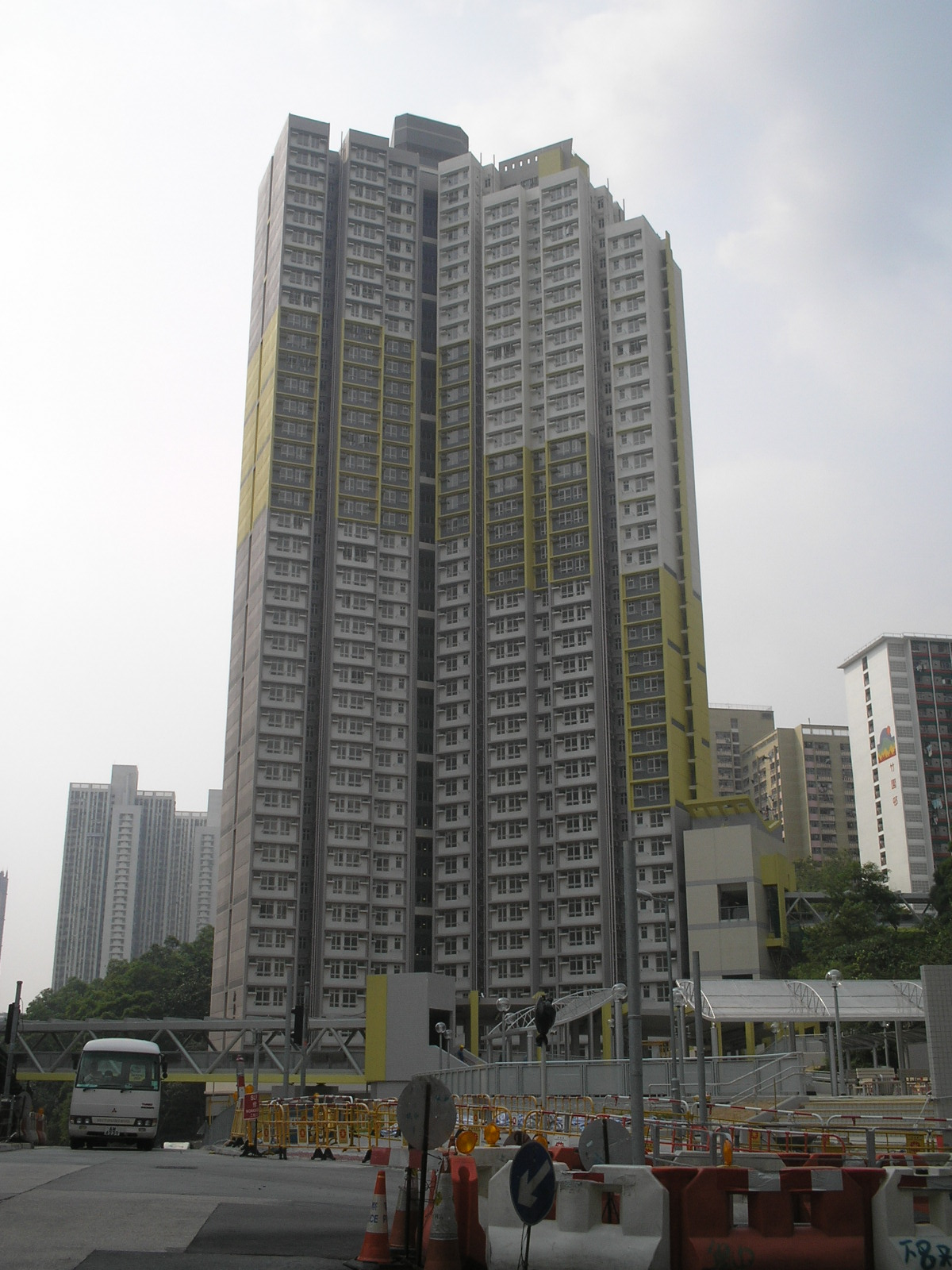
Wing Sin House, Wong Tai Sin Estate in October 2009

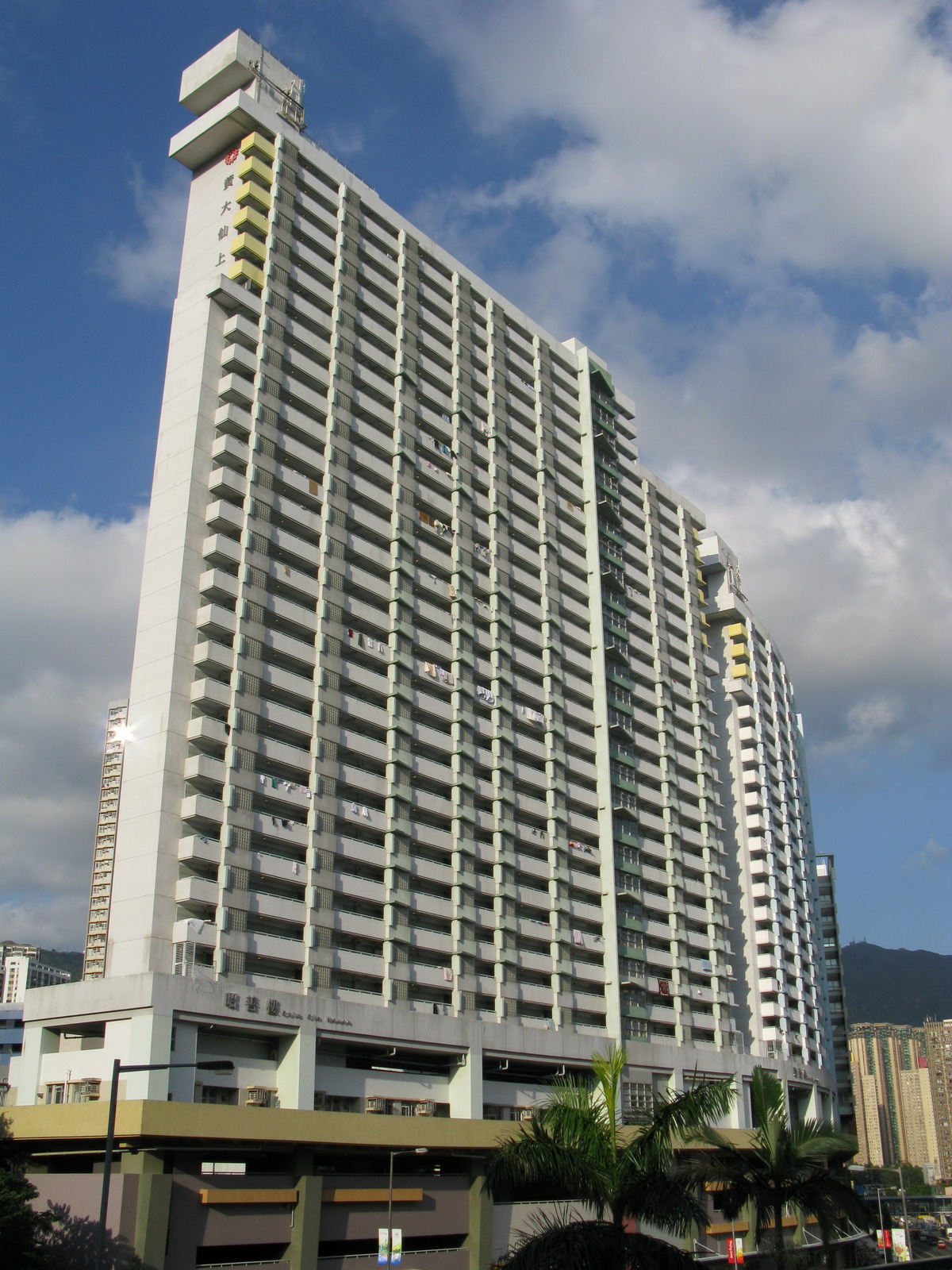
Chiu Sin House, Wong Tai Sin Estate in August 2008

Upper Wong Tai Sin Estate (Chinese: 黃大仙上邨) is a public housing estate in Wong Tai Sin, Kowloon, Hong Kong, along the north of Lung Cheung Road, near Wong Tai Sin Temple and MTR Wong Tai Sin station. It consists of eight blocks built in 2000 and 2009 respectively, and it is now undergoing redevelopment.

== Background ==
Upper Wong Tai Sin Estate was a Government Low Cost Housing Estate, called Wong Tai Sin Government Low Cost Housing Estate (黃大仙政府廉租屋邨). It was divided into eastern and western parts. Western part had a total of 14 blocks (no Block 13) built in 1963 while Eastern part had 5 totally blocks in 1965. In 1973, it was renamed as Upper Wong Tai Sin Estate. In 1980, Block 8 of Lower Wong Tai Sin Estate, located at the south of Lung Cheung Road, was reassigned to Upper Wong Tai Sin Estate. And it was renamed as "Cheung Yan House" (長欣樓).

Between 1997 and 1998, Block 1 to 12 were demolished to reconstruct seven blocks (completed in 2000) and Lung Cheung Mall (龍翔中心). In 2002, Block 14 and 15 were demolished to construct a block (completed in 2009). Between 2005 and 2007, a carnival-type bazaar, "Creative Arts Playground" (創藝坊), was established on the vacant eastern site to provide employment opportunities and promote district characteristics. After the activity ended, Wong Tai Sin Square (黃大仙廣場) is now being constructed on the site.

== Houses ==
Name	Type	Completion
Cheong Sin House	Harmony 1	2000
Kai Sin House	Harmony 1	2000
Tat Sin House	Harmony 1	2000
Yiu Sin House	Harmony 1	2000
Chiu Sin House	Single Aspect Building	2000
Po Sin House	Single Aspect Building	2000
Yat Sin House	Single Aspect Building	2000
Wing Sin House	Non-standard	2009

== Others ==
- Lower Wong Tai Sin Estate
