= Wong Tai Sin Temple (Hong Kong) =

Taoist shrine in Hong Kong

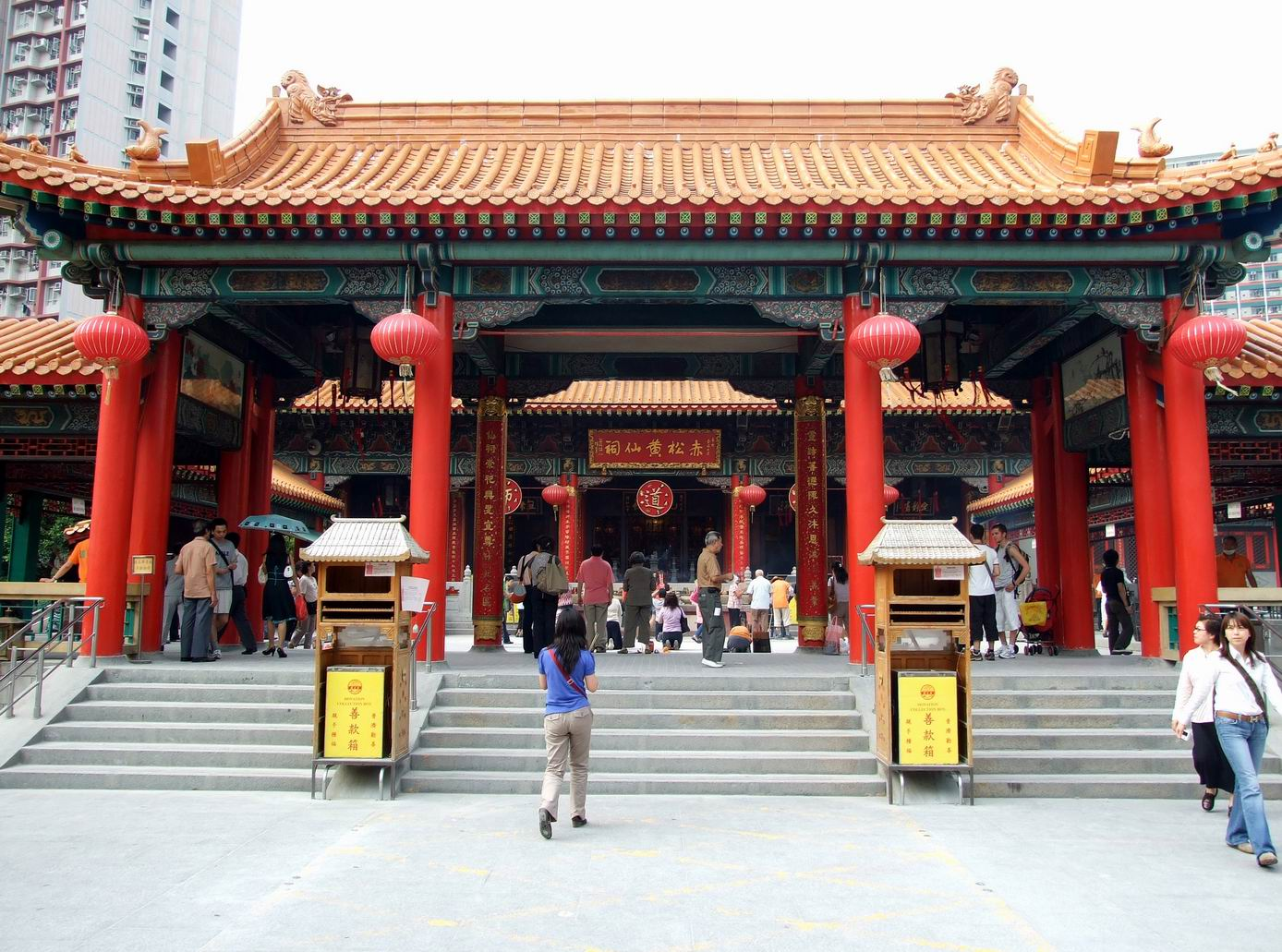
- The main altar, 2007

- Location in Hong Kong

Religion
- Affiliation: Taoism
- Deity: Wong Tai Sin

Location
- Location: 2 Chuk Yuen Road, Wong Tai Sin, Wong Tai Sin District, New Kowloon, Hong Kong
- Country: Hong Kong
- Coordinates: 22°20′33″N 114°11′37″E

Architecture
- Completed: 1921; 105 years ago

Wong Tai Sin Temple
- Traditional Chinese: 黃大仙祠
- Simplified Chinese: 黄大仙祠
Transcriptions
Standard Mandarin
- Hanyu Pinyin: Huángdàxiāncí
Yue: Cantonese
- Yale Romanization: Wòhng daaih sīn chìh
- Jyutping: Wong4 daai6 sin1 ci4
- Sidney Lau: Wong4 daai6 sin1 chi4

Wong Tai Sin Temple (Chinese: 黃大仙祠) is a well known shrine and tourist attraction in Hong Kong. It is dedicated to Wong Tai Sin, or the Great Immortal Wong. The 18,000 m^{2} (190,000 sq ft) Taoist temple is famed for the many prayers answered: "What you request is what you get" (有求必應) via a practice called kau chim. The temple is located on the southern side of Lion Rock in the north of Kowloon.

== History ==
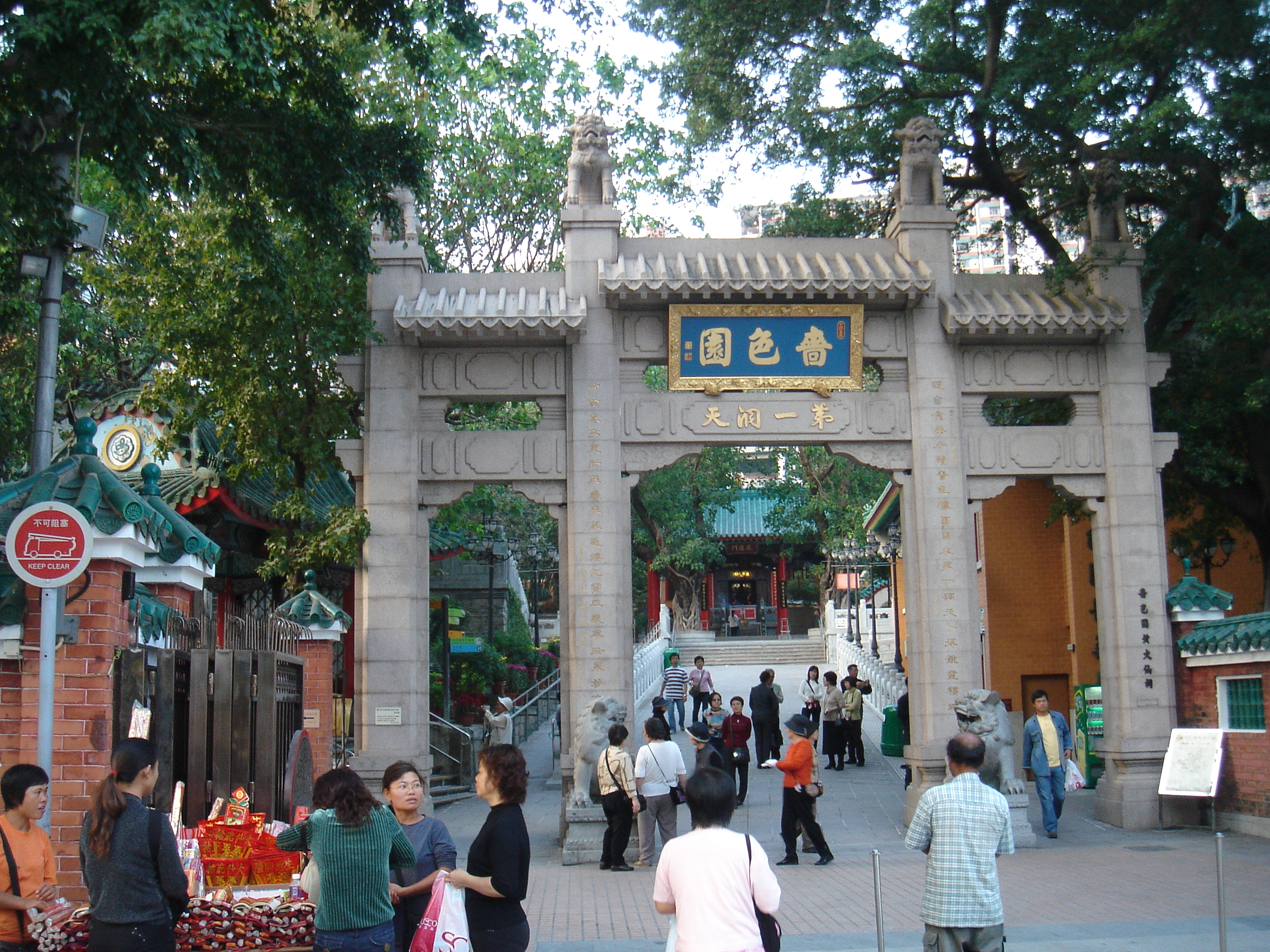
Entrance of the Wong Tai Sin Temple.

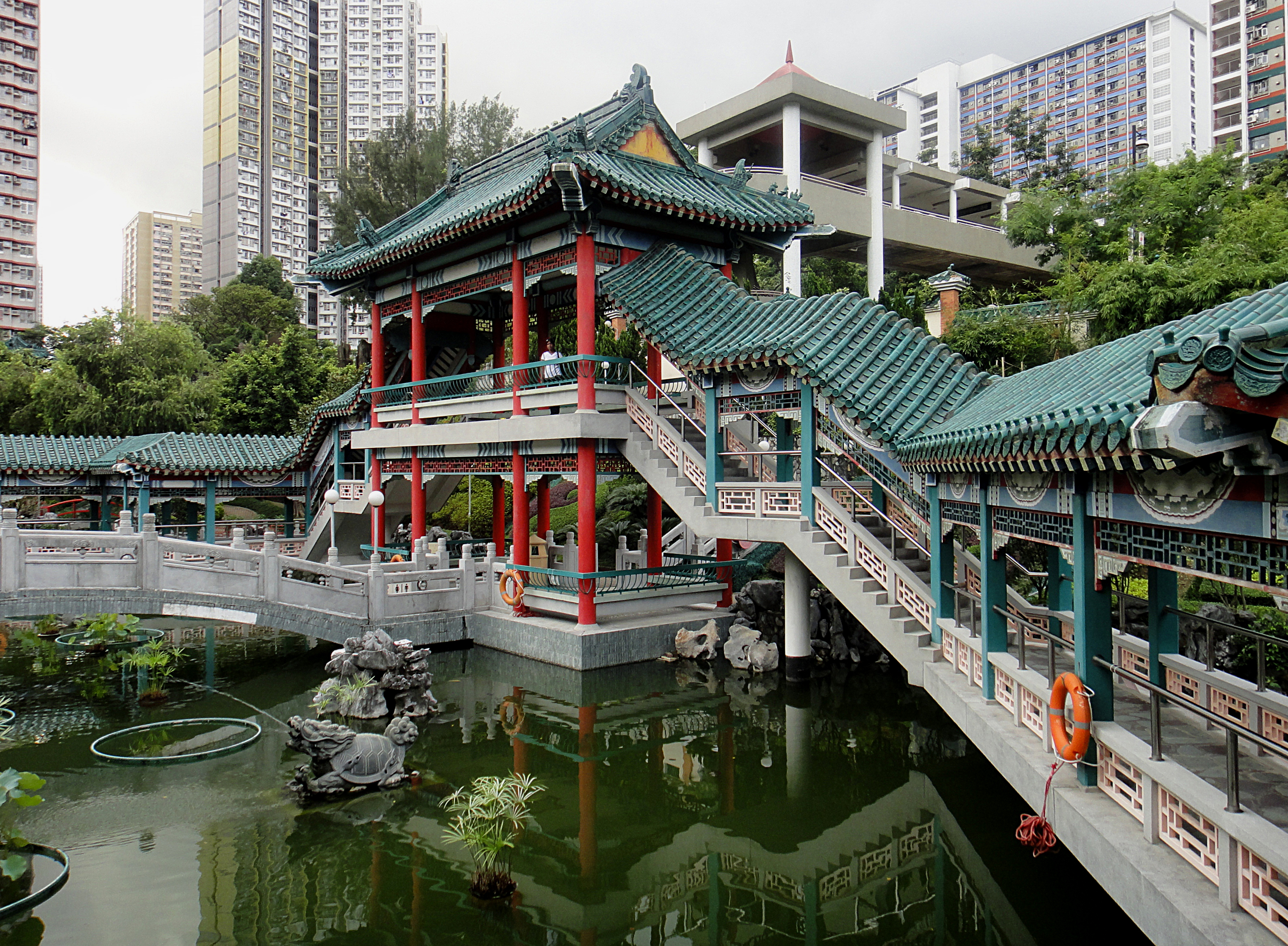
Good Wish Garden, within Wong Tai Sin Temple

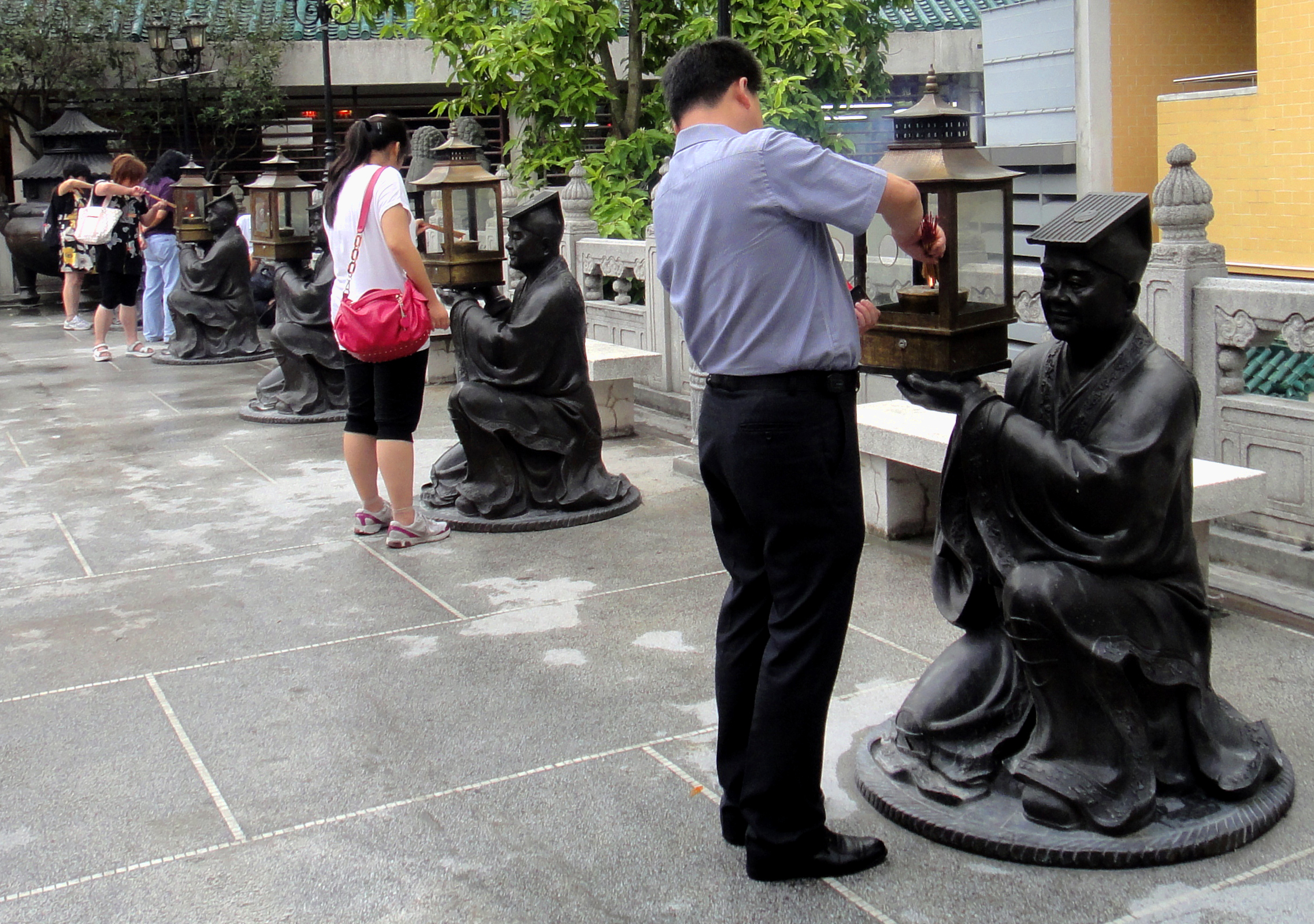
Lamp holding statues in Wong Tai Sin Temple

In the early 20th century, Leung Yan-am (梁仁菴) from Namgong village (稔岡) near Mount Sai Chiu in Namhoi, Guangdong Province spread the influence of Wong Tai Sin to Wan Chai in Hong Kong. Wong Tai Sin was obscure and largely unknown before Leung took it to Hong Kong.

Leung arrived in Hong Kong in 1915. He rented an apartment in Wan Chai, and set up an altar to Wong Tai Sin in his apartment. For the image of Wong Tai Sin, he used a picture of Wong Tai Sin which he brought from Namgong village. By March 1916, he opened an herbal medicine shop nearby and moved the altar to the back of the shop. Customers coming to his shop could pray at Wong Tai Sin's altar and seek advice for their ailments. Leung would then fill their prescriptions. The popularity of Wong Tai Sin then began to grow.

However, in 1918, Leung's shop was destroyed by fire. Then, Leung moved back to Namgong as he was now 57 or 58 years old and only could live for three years.

In 1921, Leung said that he received a message from Wong Tai Sin instructing him to construct a new shrine through "Fu Ji" (扶乩), a divination technique that uses a suspended sieve or tray to guide a stick which writes Chinese characters in sand or incense ashes. Leung Yan-am and his Taoist fellow were advised to start walking to the site which was 3600 paces from a pier They found the spot which was about the right distance form Kowloon City Pier. When they arrived at Chuk Yuen Village (竹園村), they put a piece of bamboo into the ground as a mark. Then they consulted Wong Tai Sin via the process of "Fu Ji". They were told that it was a good site. Wong Tai Sin also taught them to determine the would-be centre of the Temple by 3 Chinese feet (approximately 1 m (3 ft 3 in)) on the right and 3 Chinese feet backwards of the mark and the would-be temple was named as "Chik Chung Sin Shrine" (赤松仙館; 'the Red Pine Deity Shrine'). The Taoist priests were also asked to start the construction of the shrine on 24th of the sixth lunar month by one of the Taoist Gods, Wen Chang Di (文昌帝; 'Emperor Wen Chang') via the process of "Fu Ji". Eventually the shrine was completed and was officiated on the 20th of the seventh lunar month. In the same year, on the 23rd of the eighth lunar month, during the celebration of the birthday of Wong Tai Sin, the altar was named as "Pu Yi Tan" (普宜壇; 'Pu Yi Altar') by the most supreme Taoist God, Yu Di (玉帝; 'Jade Emperor') via the process of "Fu Ji". Later on, the other Taoist God, Wen Chang Di gave the name of the premises as "Sik Sik Yuen" (嗇色園; 'Sik Sik Garden') via the process of "Fu Ji". Meanwhile, the managing body, Sik Sik Yuen was established. In 1925, the shrine was renamed as "Chik Chung Wong Sin Hall" (赤松黃仙祠; 'the Red Pine Immortal Wong Hall') by Taoist Immortal, Lü Dongbin (Chinese: 呂洞賓) through the process of "Fu Ji". Since then, the name "Chik Chung Wong Sin Hall" has replaced the original name.

The funds of building the temple were mainly by four rich businessmen. It is likely that these men had been clients of Leung's medical prescription shrine in Wan Chai, and had become believers as a result of the benefits they believed could be obtained from these prescriptions.

During and after the World War Two, many Chinese escaped to Hong Kong from China and they only could settle in the Kowloon site which near the temple. These immigrants became refugees in Hong Kong. The Wong Tai Sin Temple, overlooking large stretches of these squatter settlements in the 1950s., filled a need for a major local shrine among this rapidly growing population eager for upward mobility. These people needed a god whose attention was not already occupied by the locals, luckily, Wong Tai Sin Temple was ready to receive any and all new worshippers, like these immigrants. The popularity of Wong Tai Sin Temple had rapidly been grown since that time.

According to the then regulations, Sik Sik Yuen used to be a private shrine and only Taoists or their family members were allowed. It was not until 1934, Sik Sik Yuen formally applied to the government for opening the Temple to the public during the 1st lunar month of every Chinese New Year. Finally, Sik Sik Yuen was allowed to open completely to the public in 1956.

In 1956, the government proposed to reclaim the temple for public housing development. Chairman Wong Wan Tin's pushed for the temple to remain open. Charging a 10-cent admission fee at the main entrance, fees were donated to the Tung Wah Group of Hospitals. To facilitate administration and management, the temple was registered as a limited company of charitable nature in 1965, and was granted the immunity of not having to add the word "Limited" to the organisation's name.

Because of its historic significance, the Temple is graded as a Grade I historic building. The temple also is the first Taoist temple allowed by the government to organise Taoist weddings and issue marriage certificates.

== Facilities ==
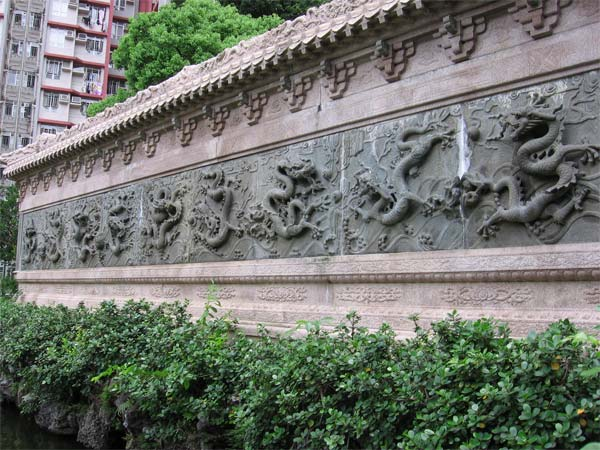
The Nine Dragon Wall

The temple consists of traditional Chinese architecture with red pillars, a gold roof with blue friezes, yellow latticework and multi-coloured carvings.

There is a Nine-Dragon Wall modelled after one in Beijing. Some of the halls include the Great Hall (大雄寶殿) and the Three-Saint Hall (三聖堂). The Three-Saint Hall is dedicated to Lü Dongbin, Guan Yin, and Lord Guan. Containing a portrait of Confucius, the Taoist temple has a collection of Confucian, Taoist, and Buddhist literature.

There are also three memorial archways in the temple, with the first carved with the name of the temple at the entrance. The second memorial is along past the fortune-telling stalls, and the third one further ahead.

== Traditions ==
Annually, from 1 to 15 January, the temple receives numerous visitors, such as those whose prayers were answered returning to thank the immortal. Wong Tai Sin's birthday on the 23rd day of the 8th lunar month, and the Chinese New Year holidays are the busiest times for the temple.

On the Chinese New Year's Eve, thousands of worshippers wait outside the temple before midnight and rush in to the main altar to offer Wong Tai Sin their glowing incense sticks when the year comes. As the tradition goes, the earlier they offer the incense, the better luck they will have that year.

Most of the visitors come to the temple in search for a spiritual answer via a practice called kau chim. They light incense sticks, kneel before the main altar, make a wish, and shake a bamboo cylinder containing fortune sticks until a stick falls out. This stick is exchanged for a piece of paper bearing the same number, and then the soothsayer will interpret the fortune on the paper for the worshiper. Often the same piece of fortune is taken to multiple booths for verification purposes. Some booths offer palm reading service.

Recently, Taoist weddings have been performed here.

== Operation ==
The temple is open from 7:00am to 5:00pm throughout the year, and runs overnight in the Lunar New Year Eve. It is currently administered by Sik Sik Yuen (嗇色園) a Taoist organisation in Hong Kong.

== Education (by Sik Sik Yuen) ==
=== Secondary schools ===
- Ho Fung College
- Ho Lap College
- Ho Dao College
- Ho Ngai College
- Ho Yu College and Primary School

=== Primary schools ===
- Ho Shun Primary School
- Ho Lap Primary School
- Ho Ming Primary School

=== Kindergartens and nursery ===
- Ho Yu Kindergarten
- Ho Shui Kindergarten
- Ho Lap Kindergarten
- Ho Ching Kindergarten
- Ho Yan Kindergarten
- Ho Tak Kindergarten and Ho Tak Child Care Centre
- Ho Oi Day Nursery

=== Education centre ===
- Ho Koon Nature Education cum Astronomical Centre

== In popular culture ==
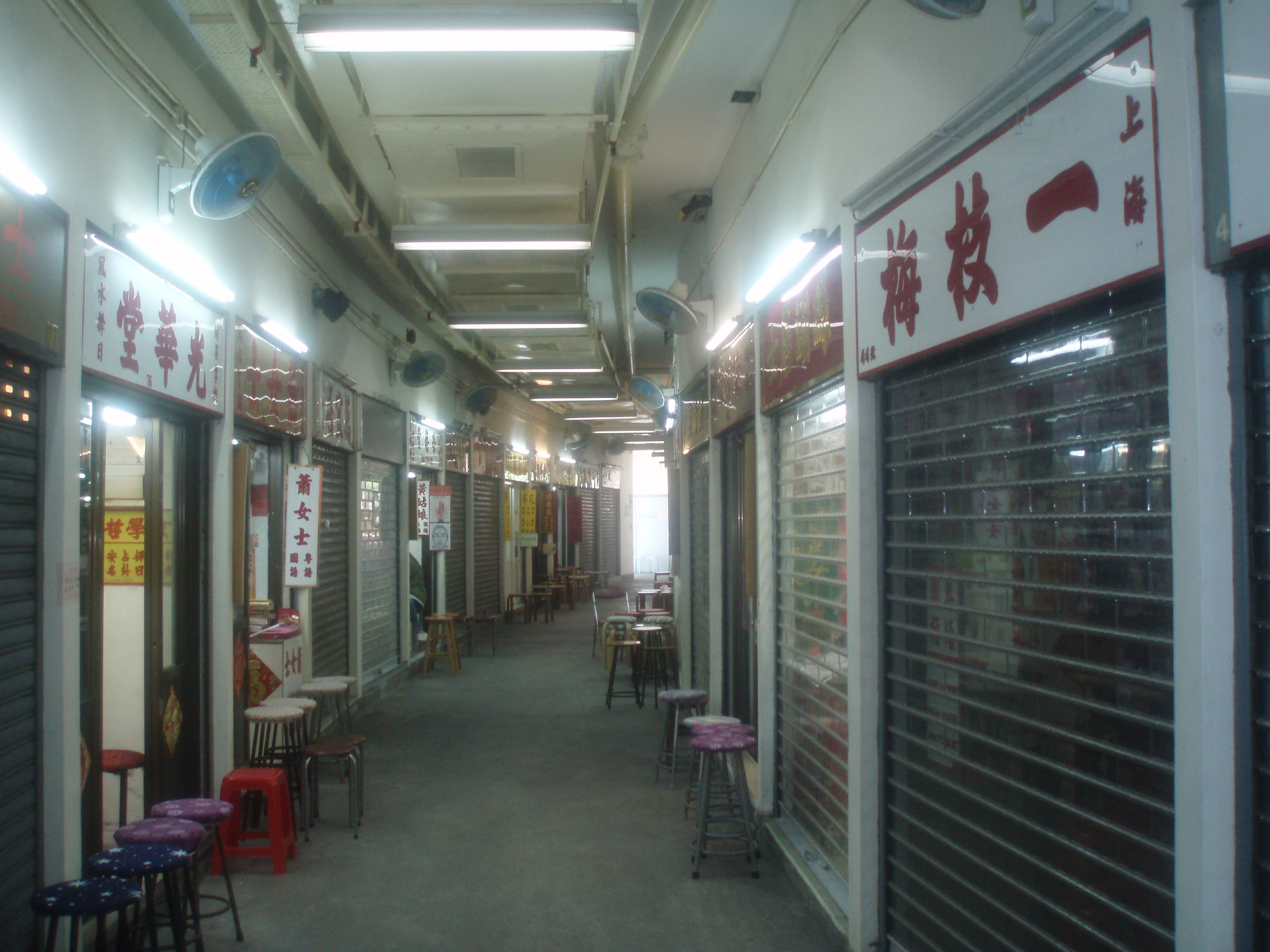
The stall No.44 inside Wong Tai Sin Fortune-telling and Oblation Arcade was visited by American TV show The Amazing Race 2.

The Wong Tai Sin Fortune-telling and Oblation Arcade was a site of the Fast Forward in the seventh leg of the reality TV show The Amazing Race 2, in which racers had to find the fortune-teller Amelia Chow (in stall No.44) to have a face reading and a palm reading.

== See also ==
- Air pollution in Hong Kong
- Wong Tai Sin
- Wong Tai Sin Temple (Guangzhou)
- Ho Fung College
- Ho Lap College
- Taoism in Hong Kong
- Places of worship in Hong Kong
