= Mei Lam Estate =

Public housing estate in Tai Wai, Hong Kong

Coordinates: 22.378303°N 114.176518°E

- Chinese: 美林邨
- Cantonese Yale: méih làhm chyūn
- Literal meaning: beautiful forest estate
Transcriptions
Yue: Cantonese
- Yale Romanization: méih làhm chyūn
- Jyutping: mei5 lam4 cyun1

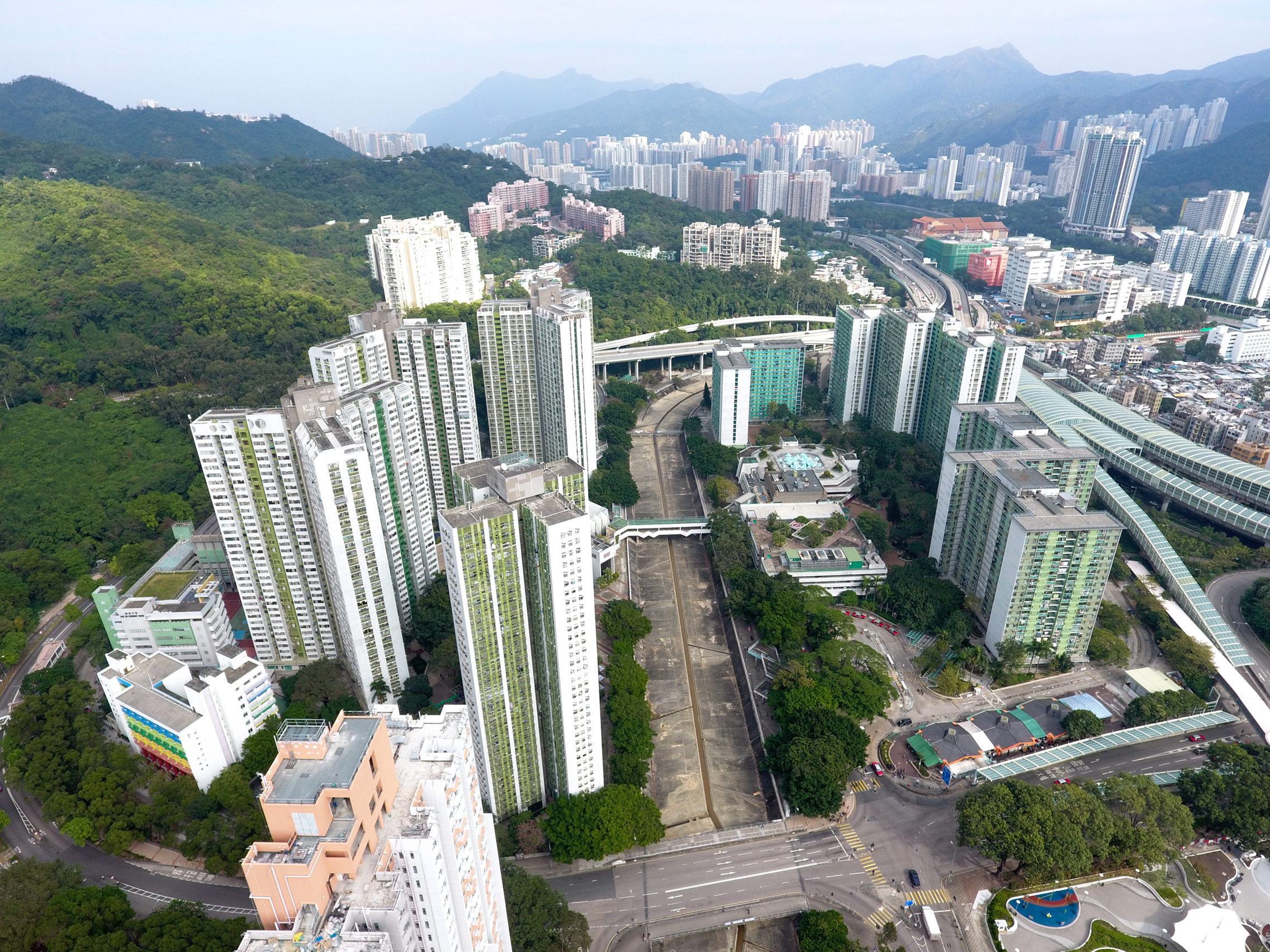
Mei Lam Estate

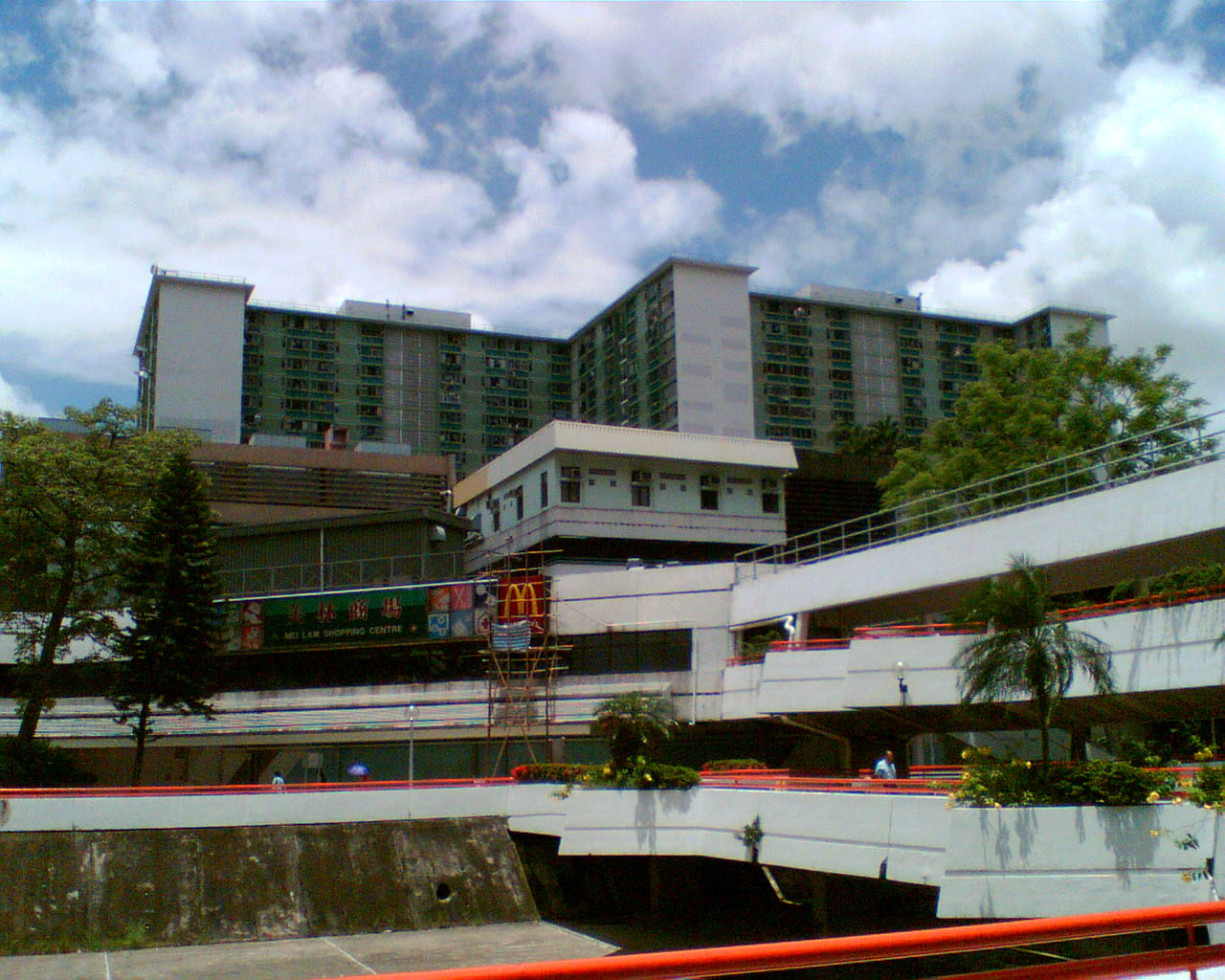
The footbridge across Tai Wai Nullah, connecting two sides of Mei Lam Estate

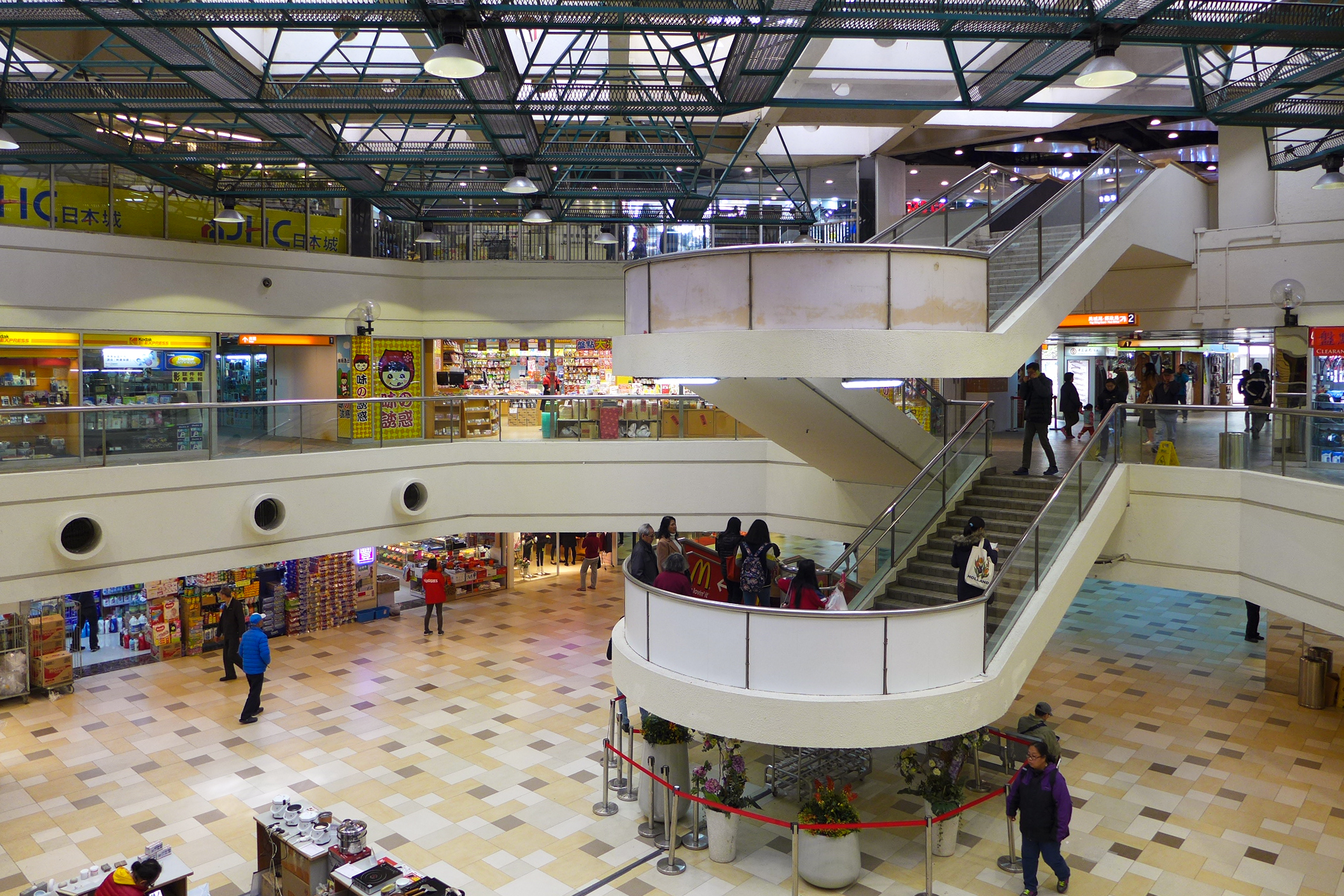
Atrium of Mei Lam Shopping Centre

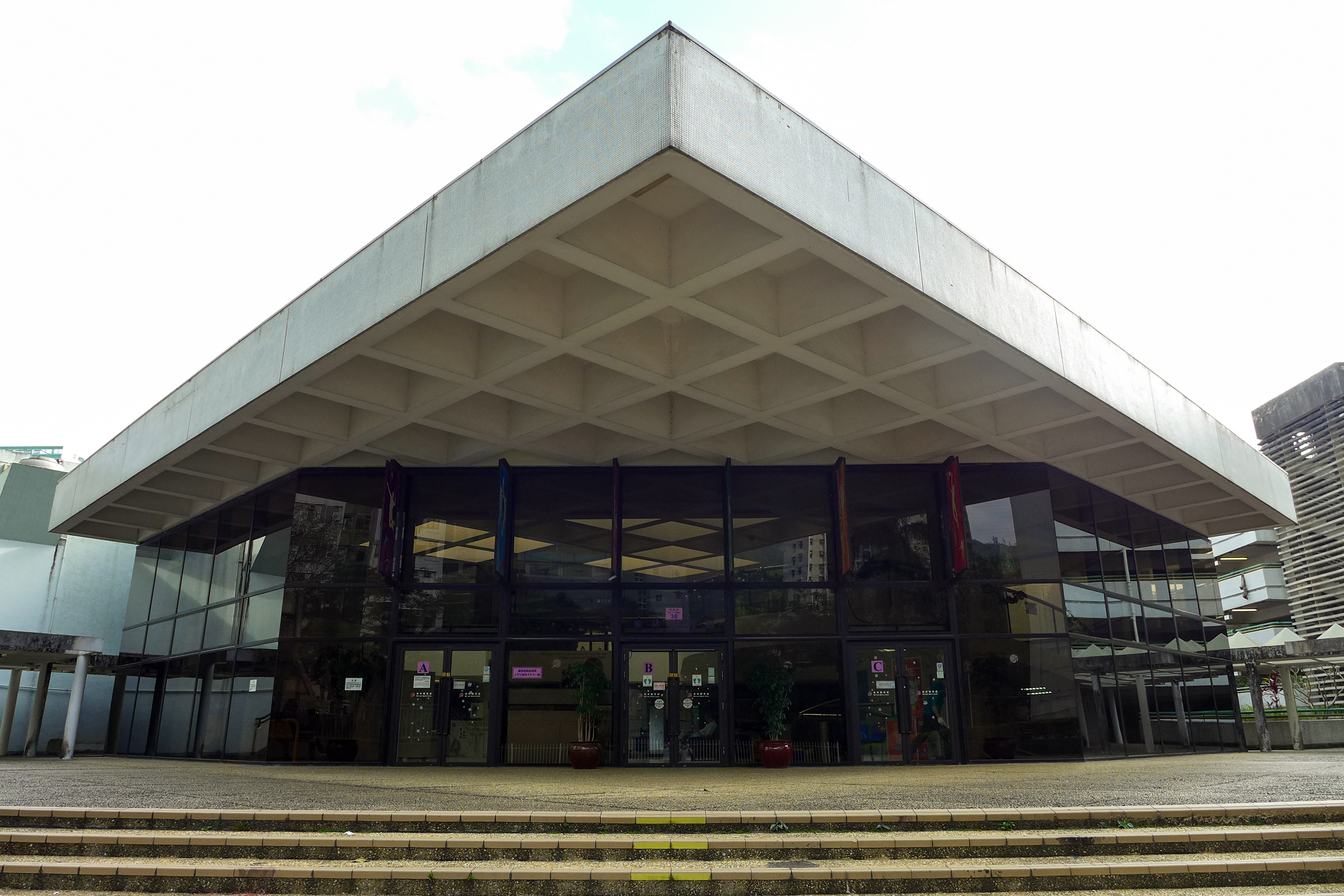
Mei Lam Sports Centre

Mei Lam Estate (Chinese: 美林邨) is a public housing estate in Tai Wai, Sha Tin District, New Territories, Hong Kong, located on both sides of Tai Wai Nullah (sometimes referred to as the upper stream of Shing Mun River) and near Mei Chung Court, May Shing Court and the Shing Mun Tunnels.

== Description ==
The estate consists of 4 residential buildings, a shopping centre and a sports centre. It is divided into 3 phases. Phase 1 (Mei Fung House, Mei Yeung House, Mei Tao House and Mei Lam Shopping Centre) are located at the south side of Tai Wai Nullah, while Phase 2 (Mei Wai House) and Phase 3 (Mei Lam Sports Centre) are located at the north side. The two sides are connected by a footbridge. The estate comprises a total 4,100 rental flats, of sizes ranging from 10.8 m^{2} to 64.7 m^{2}.

Mei Lam Post Office, within Mei Lam Commercial Centre, opened on November 15, 1982.

Mei Lam Sports Centre (美林體育館) covers an area of 2200 m^{2}. It opened on September 20, 1986.

Mei Lam Estate Phase 1 and Mei Lam Sports Centre won the Certificate of Merit and the Silver Medal of HKIA in 1982 and 1987 respectively.

=== Houses ===
Name	Type	Completion
Mei Fung House (美楓樓)	Double I	1981
Mei Yeung House (美楊樓)	Old Slab	1981
Mei Tao House (美桃樓)	Triple H	1982
Mei Wai House (美槐樓)	Trident 1	1985

=== Demographics ===
The authorised population was 11,400 as at end December 2007. It was 10,200 as at end September 2019. According to the 2016 Population By-census, the actual number of persons living in Mei Lam Estate was 9,879. 98% of the population was of Chinese ancestry. Median monthly domestic household income was HK$ 14,900.

== May Shing Court ==
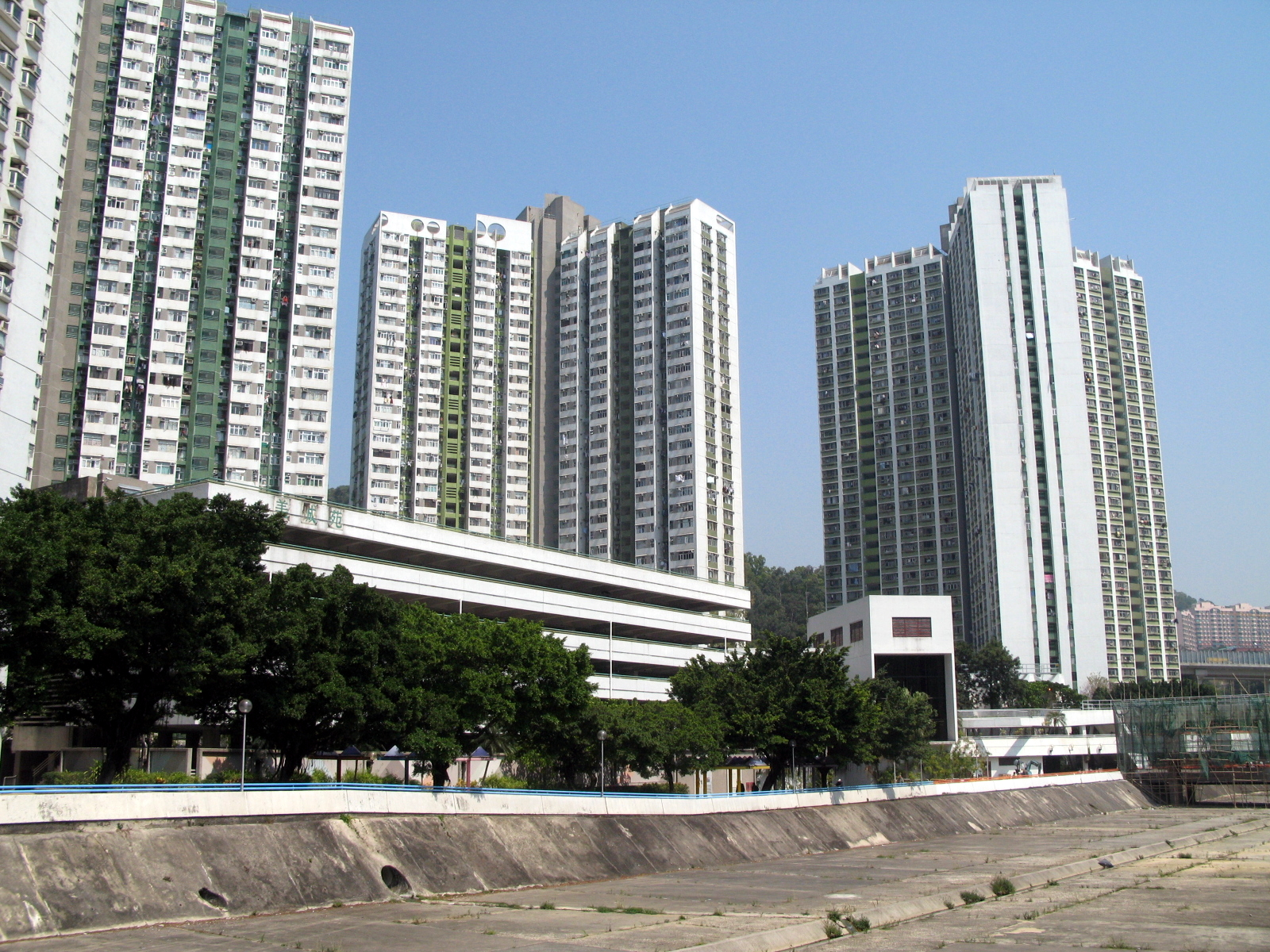
From left to right: Yat Shing House and Fai Shing House of May Shing Court, Mei Wai House of Mei Lam Estate. Upper Shing Mun River in the foreground.

May Shing Court (Chinese: 美城苑) is a Home Ownership Scheme court located near Mei Lam Estate and Mei Chung Court. It has 3 residential blocks completed in 1984 and 1985 respectively.

=== Houses ===
Name	Type	Completion
Kwai Shing House	Windmill	1984
Yat Shing House	Trident 2	1985
Fai Shing House	Trident 2	1985

== Mei Chung Court ==
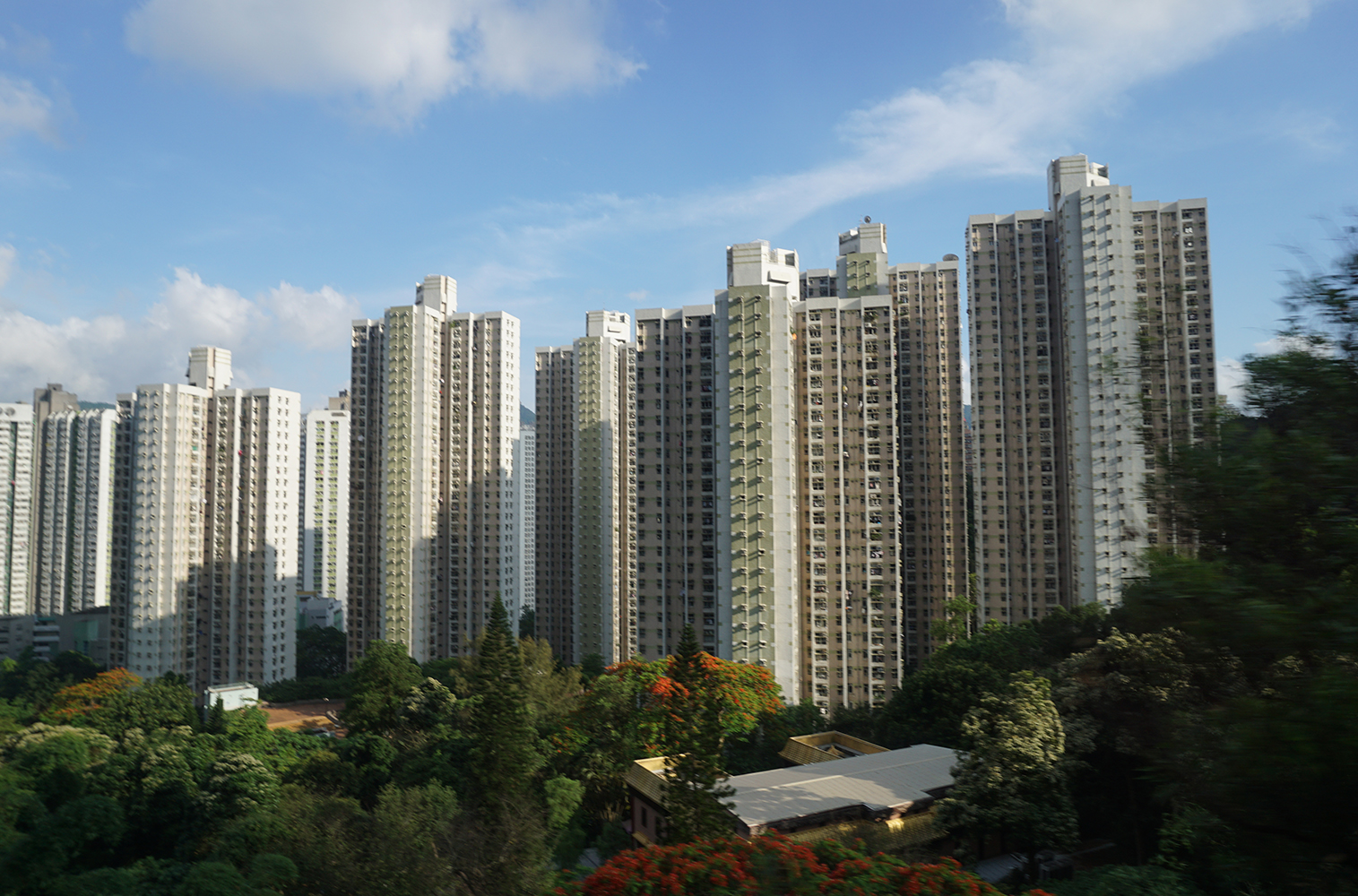
Mei Chung Court

Mei Chung Court (Chinese: 美松苑) is a Home Ownership Scheme court located near Mei Lam Estate. It has 6 residential blocks completed in 1996.

=== Houses ===
Name	Type	Completion
Fu Chung House	NCB (Ver.1984)	1996
Lai Chung House	NCB (Ver.1984)	1996
Hing Chung House	NCB (Ver.1984)	1996
Shing Chung House	NCB (Ver.1984)	1996
Hong Chung House	NCB (Ver.1984)	1996
Lok Chung House	NCB (Ver.1984)	1996

== See also ==
- Public housing estates in Tai Wai
