= Shek Wai Kok Estate =

Public housing estate in Tsuen Wan, Hong Kong

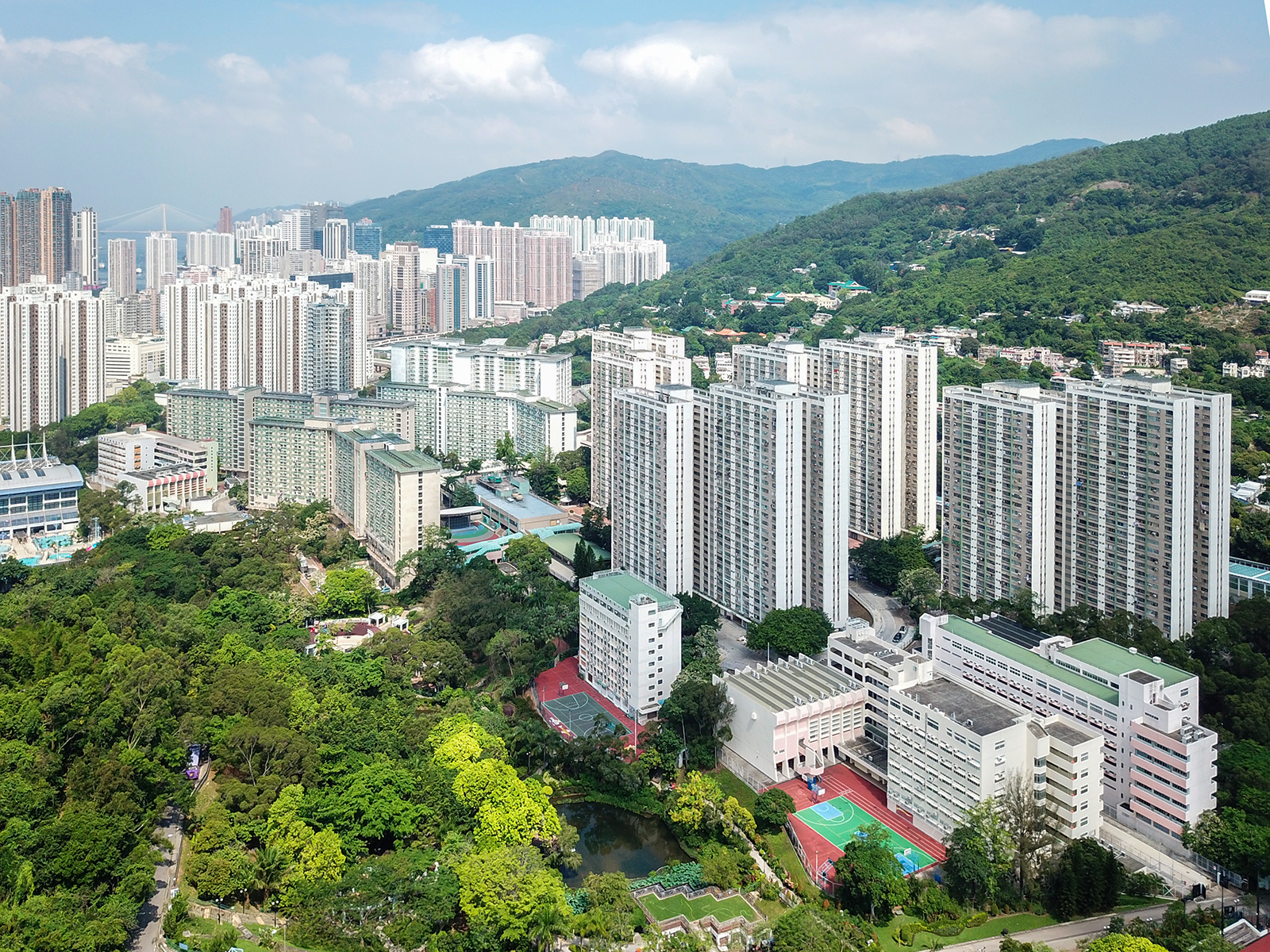
- Shek Wai Kok Estate
- Interactive map of Shek Wai Kok Estate

General information
- Location: 3 Shek Wai Kok Road, Shek Wai Kok; New Territories, Hong Kong
- Coordinates: 22.3753°N 114.1237°E
- Status: Completed
- Category: Public rental housing
- Population: 16,605 (2016)
- No. of blocks: 8
- No. of units: 6,491

Construction
- Constructed: 1980; 46 years ago
- Authority: Hong Kong Housing Authority

Shek Wai Kok Estate (Chinese: 石圍角邨) is a public housing estate in Shek Wai Kok, Tsuen Wan, New Territories, Hong Kong, near Shing Mun Valley and Luk Yeung Sun Chuen. It consists of 8 residential buildings completed in 1980 to 1982.

== History ==
On 28 September 1982, then Prime Minister of the United Kingdom Margaret Thatcher visited the estate to contact with the public by residents of the estate.

On 14 March 2001, Leung Shing-yan died after being shot by Tsui Po-ko at Flat 552, Shek To House Block B, Shek Wai Kok Estate. The incident caused a sensation in Hong Kong society.

== Houses ==
Name	Chinese name	Building type	Completed
Shek Lan House	石蘭樓	Double H	1980
Shek Kuk House	石菊樓	Double H	1981
Shek Kwai House	石葵樓	Double H	1981
Shek Tsui House	石翠樓	Double H	1981
Shek Fong House	石芳樓	Old Slab	1982
Shek Ho House	石荷樓	Old Slab	1982
Shek Lin House	石蓮樓	Old Slab	1982
Shek To House	石桃樓	Double I	1982

== Demographics ==
According to the 2016 by-census, Shek Wai Kok Estate had a population of 16,605. The median age was 51.1 and the majority of residents (98 per cent) were of Chinese ethnicity. The average household size was 2.6 people. The median monthly household income of all households (i.e. including both economically active and inactive households) was HK$20,000.

== Politics ==
For the 2019 District Council election, the estate fell within two constituencies. Most of the estate is located in the Shek Wai Kok constituency, which is represented by Man Yu-ming, while the remainder of the estate falls within the Cheung Shek constituency, which is represented by Matthew Lai Man-fai.

== See also ==
- Public housing estates in Tsuen Wan
