= I Block =

Public housing design in Hong Kong

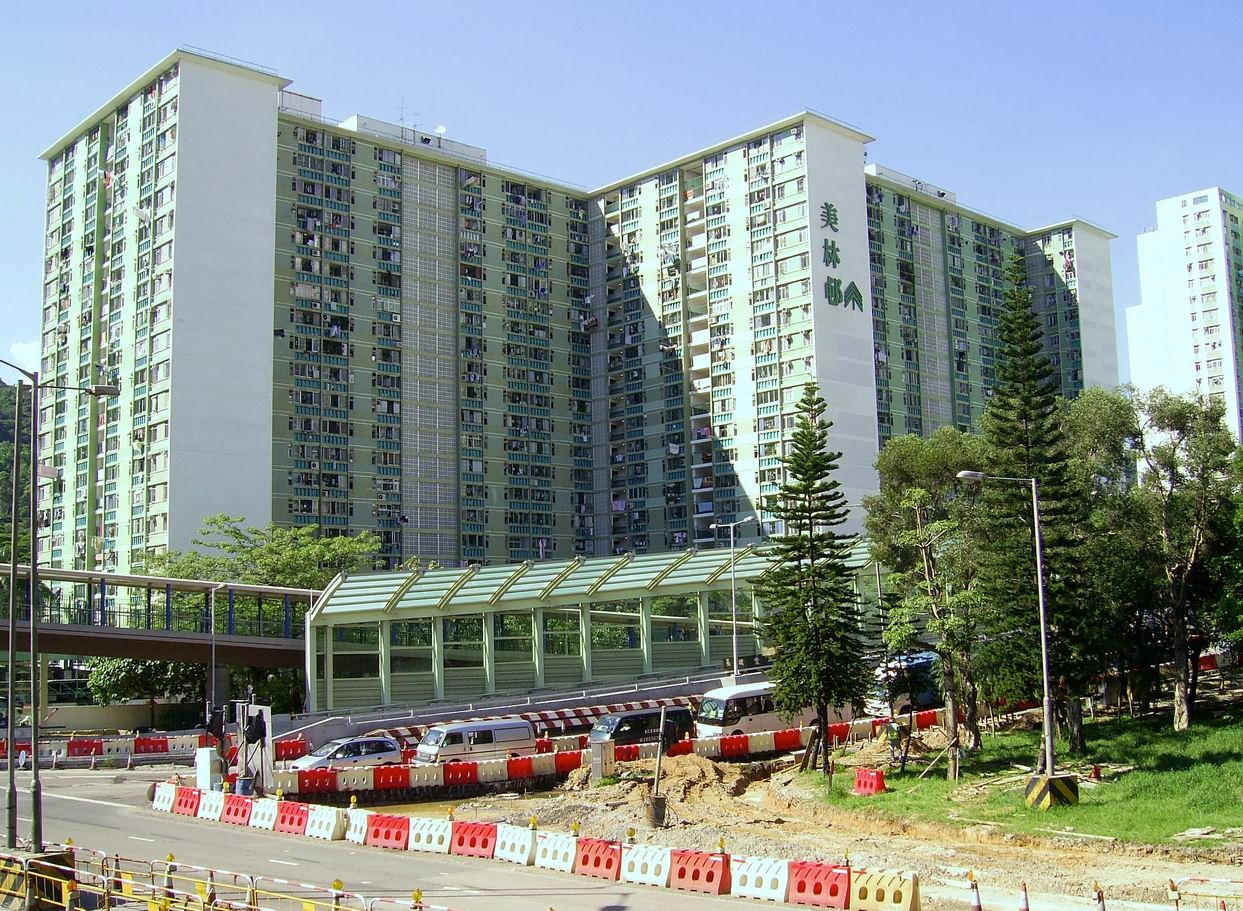
Mei Fung House of Mei Lam Estate.

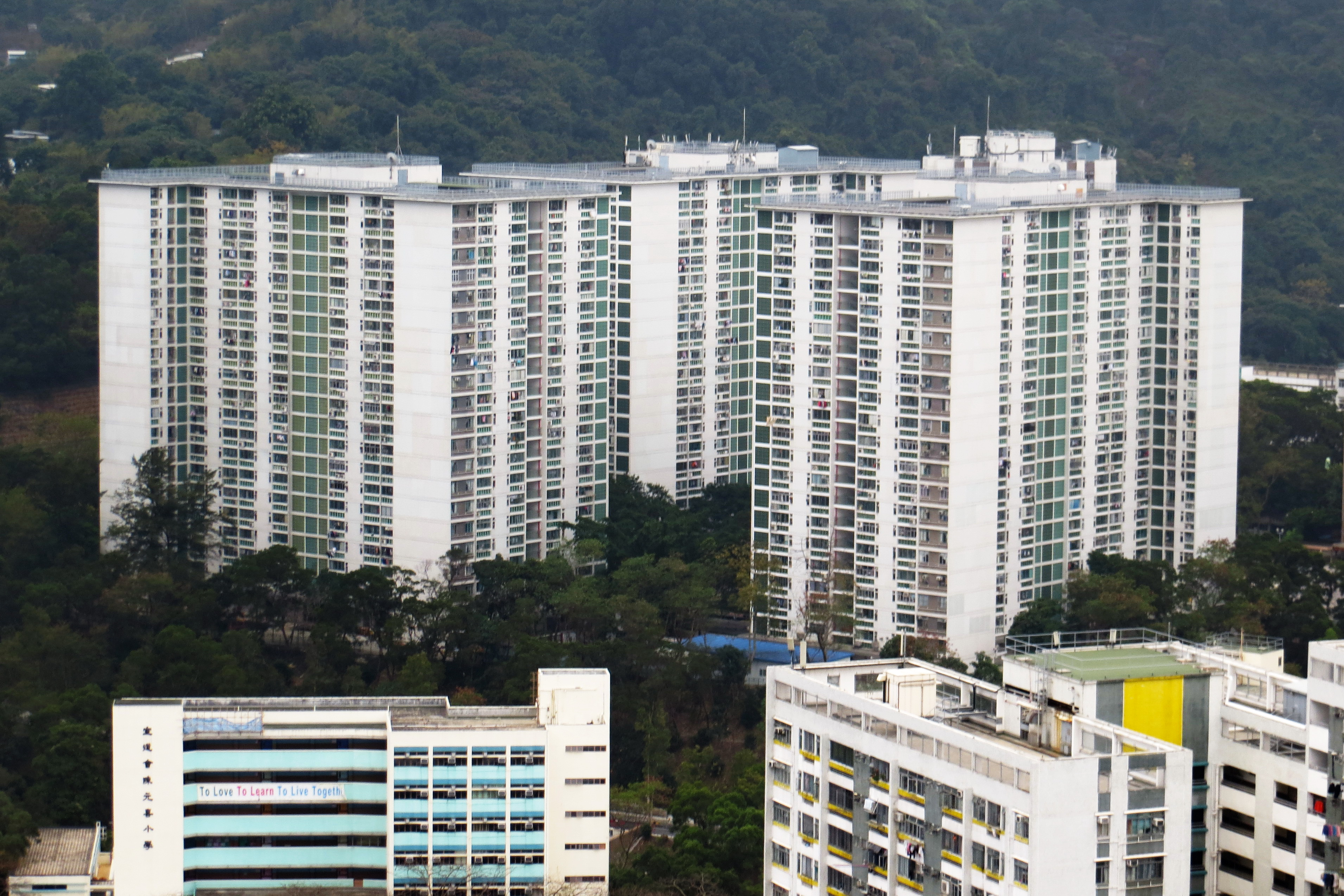
Sun Tin Wai Estate.

I Blocks (Chinese: I型大廈) are a design of public housing in Hong Kong. It is mainly divided into three variants: Single I, Double I, and Triple I. Only a few estates currently have I blocks as of today. The existing blocks were built between 1981 and 1983.

== Variants ==
The I block can be divided into three variants: Single I, Double I, and Triple I.

== Etymology ==
The building looks like the letter I. There are three wings - two long and one at the middle. It can be modular by connecting another or two more I blocks. This gave birth of Double I and Triple I.

=== Naming ===
Unlike other blocks, Double I blocks are only given one name. Such examples include Mei Fung House in Mei Lam Estate and Shek To House in Shek Wai Kok Estate.

== History ==
The first I blocks was completed in 1981, located at Sun Tin Wai Estate. (Shing Wai House, Foo Wai House, Yan Wai House, Fung Wai House, Wing Wai House) The first Double I buildings are located at Shun Tin Estate, completed about the same as shown above. The last I blocks to be built are located at Chak On Estate, completed in 1983.

== Overview ==
Usually, the height of I blocks may vary. (14-21 stories) Only medium and large units are provided inside the block. (32-39 sqm) Therefore, in public housing estates, it is built with Old Slab to balance the size of units.

Due to the I block taking a lot of space and units focusing on only one size, the I block was stopped being built in future projects. Therefore, few currently have I blocks as of today.

- Single I: Single I block contains 27 units per floor.
- Double I: Double I block contains 54 units per floor.
- Triple I: Triple I block contains 81 units per floor.

== List of blocks ==
The I blocks take up a large amount of space. Therefore, most are found in the new towns of Sha Tin, Kwun Tong, Sham Shui Po, and Tsuen Wan.

| District | Estate | Stories | Units per floor | Completed | Notes |
|---|---|---|---|---|---|
| Sham Shui Po | Chak On Estate | 14 | 27 | 1983 | Last I block in Hong Kong. |
| Sham Shui Po | Lai Kok Estate | 14 | 81（27x3 blocks） | 1981 | Triple I (given one name) |
| Kwun Tong | Kai Yip Estate | 14 | 81（27x3 blocks） | 1981 | Triple I (given one name) |
| Kwun Tong | Shun Tin Estate | 21 | 54（27x2） | 1981 | Double I block (one name) |
| Tsuen Wan | Shek Wai Kok Estate | 21 | 54 | 1982 | |
| Sha Tin | Mei Lam Estate | 21 | 54 | 1981 | First Double I block in Hong Kong. |
| Sha Tin | Sun Tin Wai Estate | 21×5 | 27×5 | 1981 | Location of the first I blocks in Hong Kong. |
Total：12 houses (18 blocks)

== See also ==
- Types of public housing estate blocks in Hong Kong
- H Block (Hong Kong)
