= Heung Fan Liu New Village =

Coordinates: 22.377103°N 114.168134°E

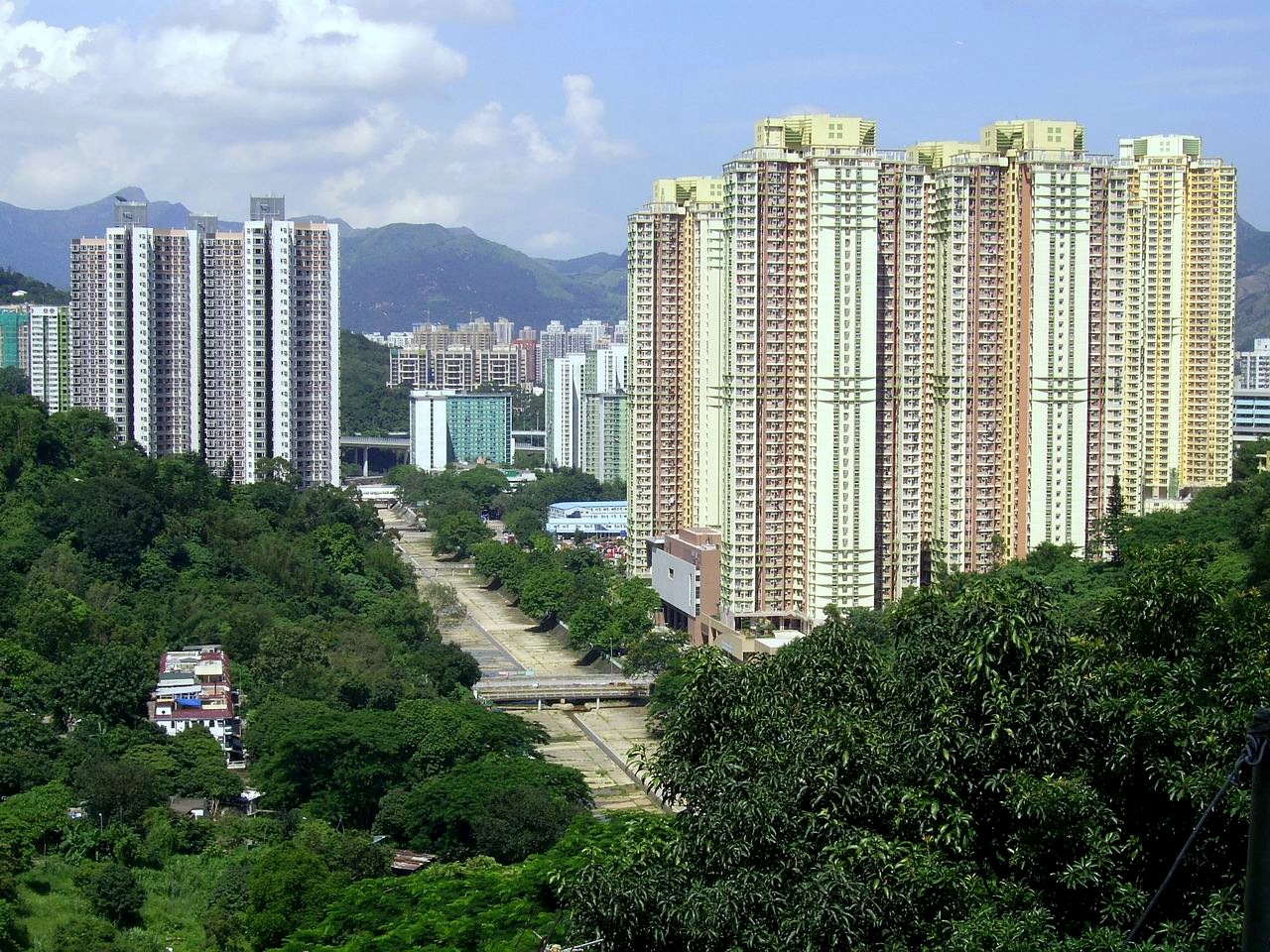
Heung Fan Liu New Village (bottom left), Tai Wai Nullah and Mei Tin Estate (right).

Heung Fan Liu New Village (Chinese: 香粉寮新村), also referred to as Heung Fan Liu Resite Area, is a village in Tai Wai, Sha Tin District, Hong Kong.

== Location ==
Heung Fan Liu New Village is located near the Tai Wai Nullah, north of Mei Tin Estate and east of the Lower Shing Mun Reservoir.

== Administration ==
Heung Fan Liu Resite Area is a recognized village under the New Territories Small House Policy.

== See also ==
- Heung Fan Liu
- Sha Kok (constituency)
