= Heung Fan Liu =

Area of Sha Tin District, Hong Kong

Coordinates: 22.376508°N 114.168325°E

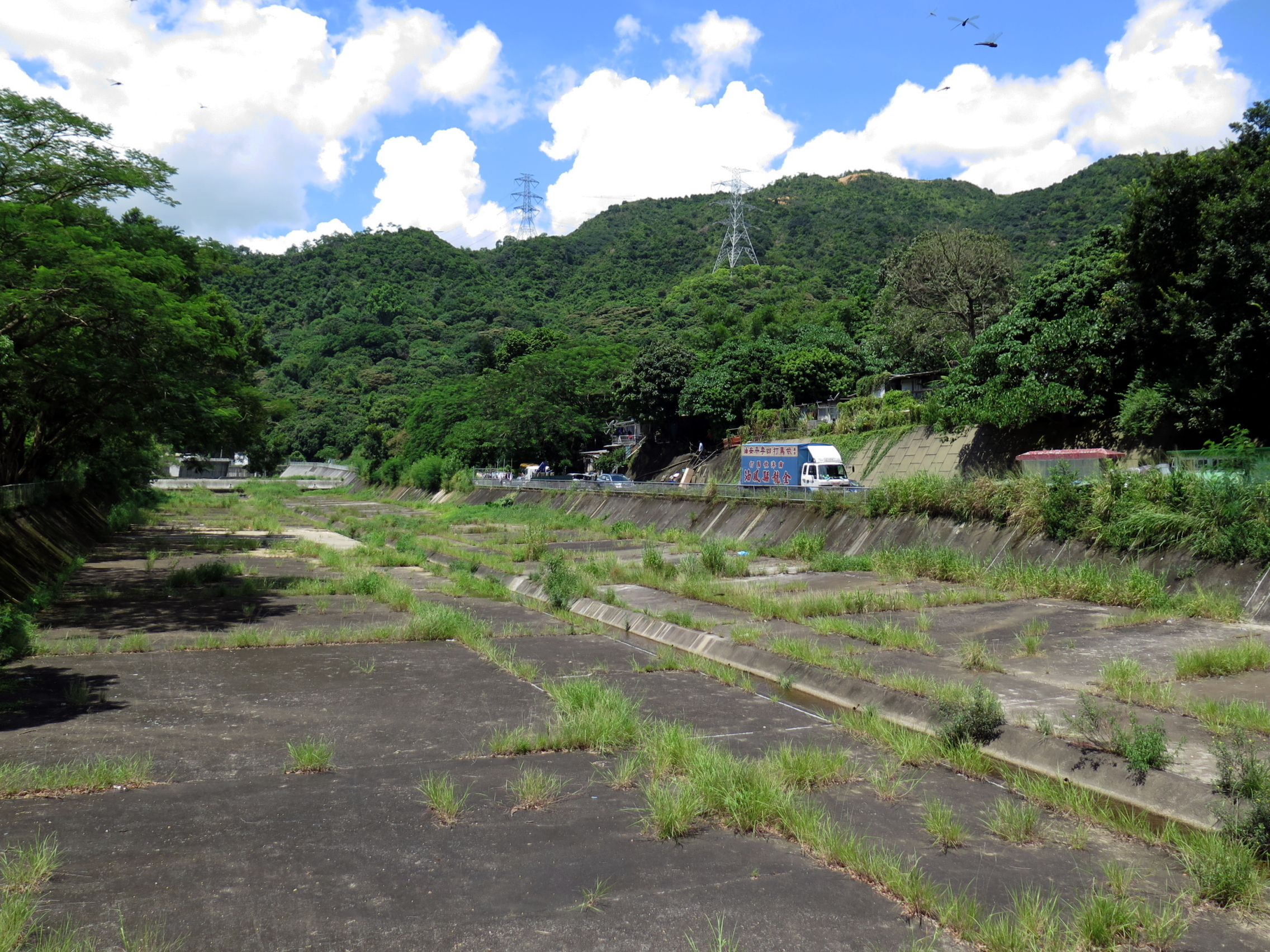
Tai Wai Nullah at Heung Fan Liu.

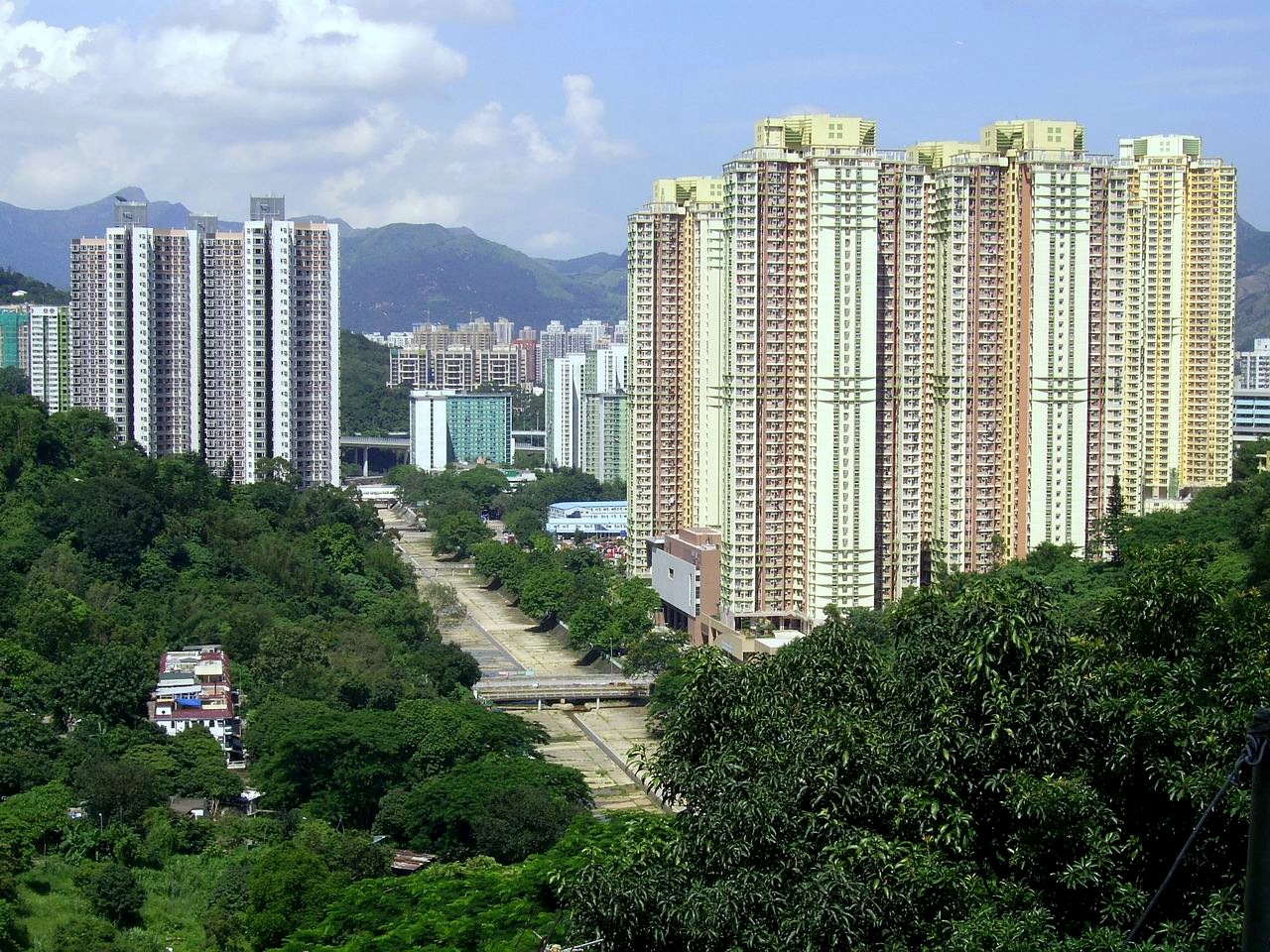
Heung Fan Liu New Village (bottom left), Tai Wai Nullah and Mei Tin Estate (right).

Heung Fan Liu (Chinese: 香粉寮; lit. 'fragrant powder sheds') is an area in Tai Wai, Sha Tin District, Hong Kong.

== History ==
Heung Fan Liu derives its name from its former incense-making industry. Incense milling may have been conducted in Heung Fan Liu as early as the late Ming dynasty. It would have been processed in Heung Fan Liu and nearby Pak Tin. This local industry ceased at the time of the Great Clearance in the second half of the 17th century. Early 20th century maps show sandalwood mills in the area. This industry was made possible thanks to the presence of a fast flowing stream with a substantial year-round flow of water to power the water-wheel. Sites with similar characteristics also existed in Pak Kiu Tsai (白橋仔) in Tai Po and Tso Kung Tam (曹公潭) in Tsuen Wan.

In 1932, Herbert Edward Lanepart (林伯氏), a Latvian believed to be of German origin, set up a nudist club by the river in Heung Fan Liu. The club moved to Wok Tai Wan in 1936, because the lease on Heung Fan Liu was expiring and the building of Shing Mun Reservoir in 1935 had lowered the level of the river and made the water murky.

== Fauna ==
The first recorded sighting of a ashy woodswallow (Artamus fuscus) in Hong Kong took place in Heung Fan Liu on April 23, 2011.

== See also ==
- Heung Fan Liu New Village
