= Shek Wai Kok =

Area in Tsuen Wan, Hong Kong

Coordinates: 22.3753°N 114.1237°E

- Traditional Chinese: 石圍角
- Simplified Chinese: 石围角
Transcriptions
Standard Mandarin
- Hanyu Pinyin: Shí Wéi Jiǎo
Yue: Cantonese
- Jyutping: sek6 wai4 gok3

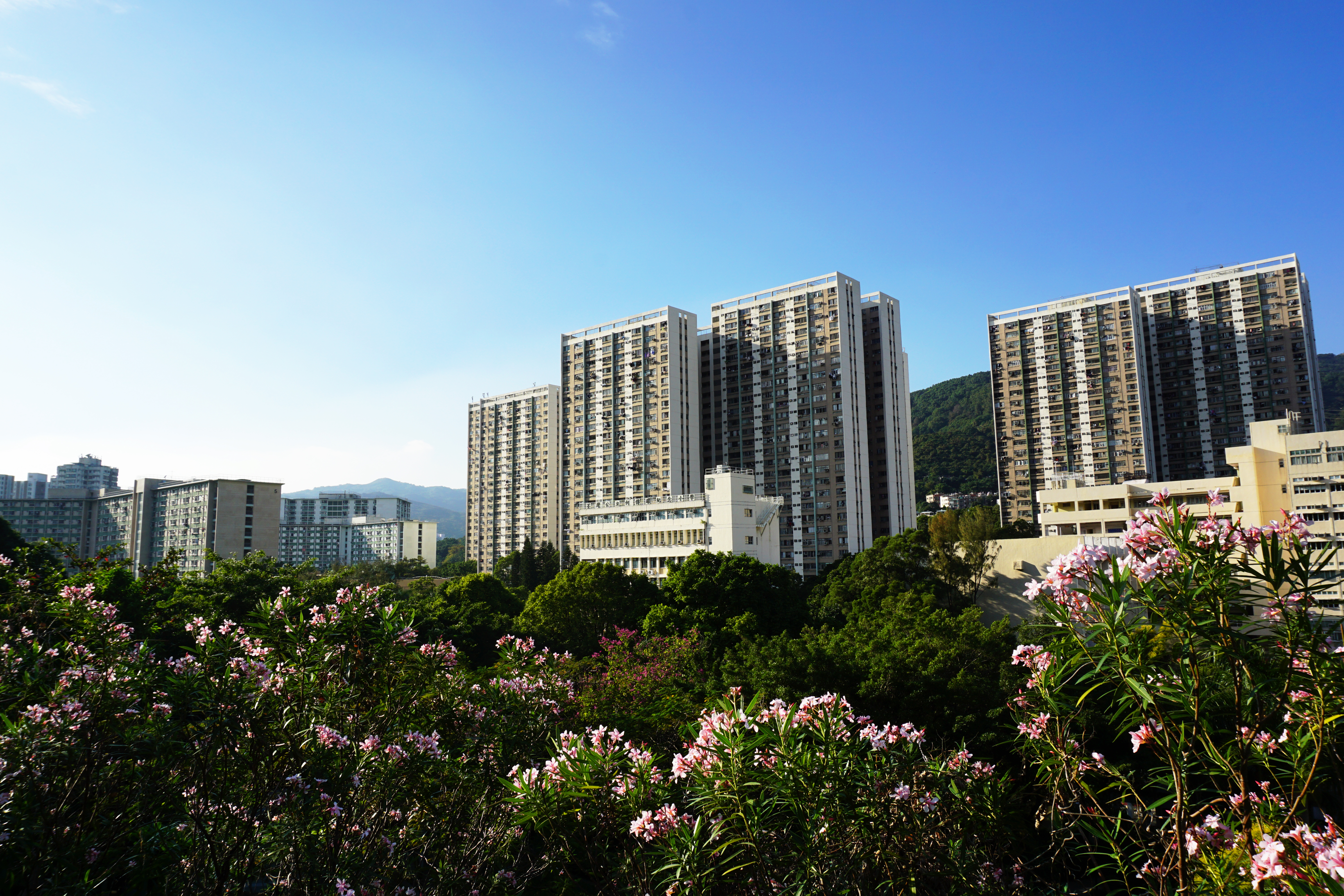
Today's Shek Wai Kok houses the public housing estate, Shek Wai Kok Estate, which is named after the original site.

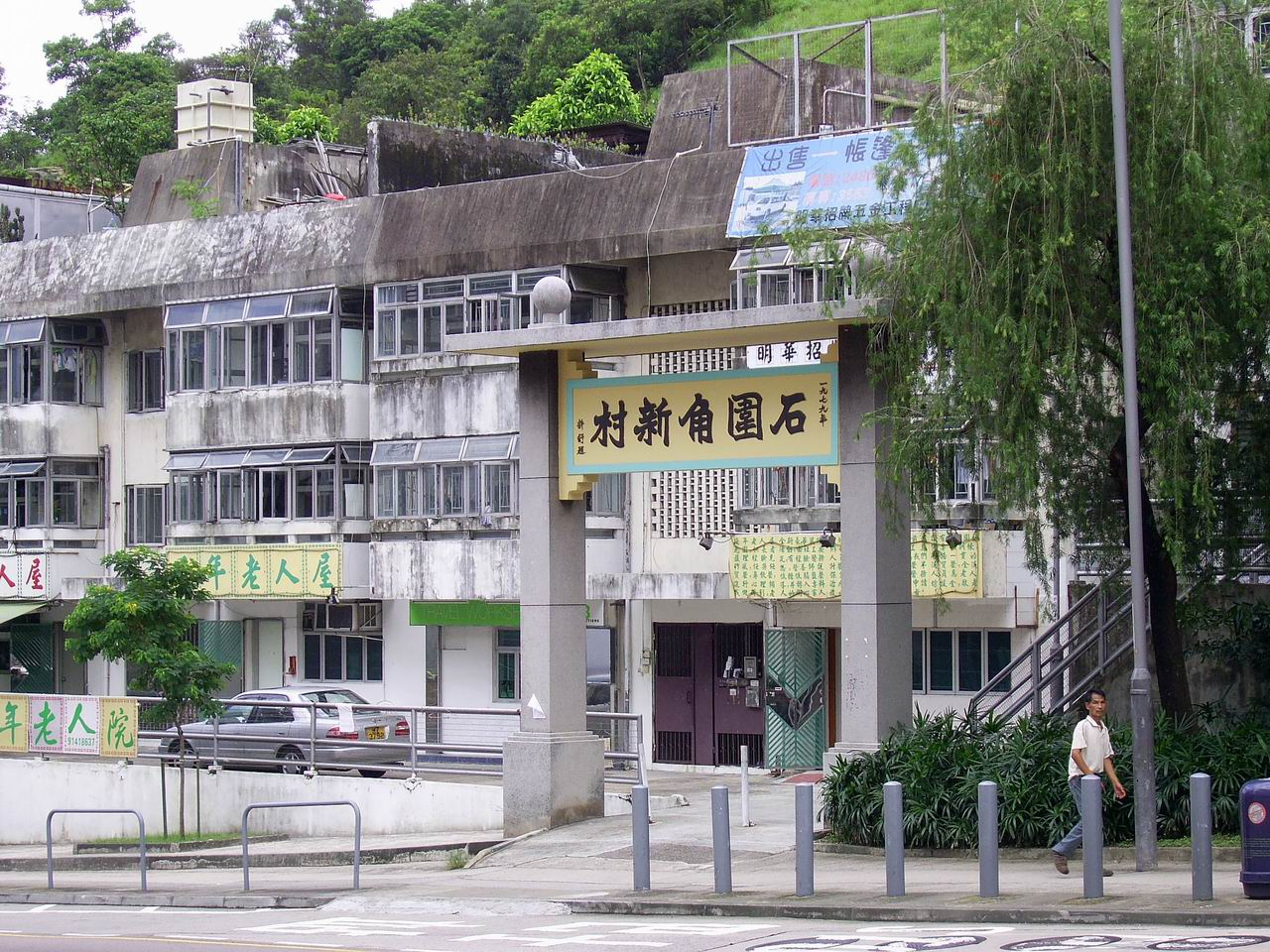
Shek Wai Kok New Village

Shek Wai Kok (Chinese: 石圍角) is a hilly area at the northeast of Tsuen Wan in Hong Kong.

== History ==
Both the original Shek Wai Kok and Lo Wai villages have been described as the oldest villages of Tsuen Wan.

In late 19th Century, it was one of four yeuk (約; 'district or administration unit') in Tsuen Wan, together with Hoi Pa, Kwai Chung and Tsing Yi. The heads of four yeuks formed the Tsuen Wan Security Council (荃灣安全局) to secure the area of Tsuen Wan.

The area was historically occupied by villages, which were relocated to Wo Yi Hop Road near Lei Muk Shue Estate in Kwai Chung and called Shek Wai Kok Sun Village (石圍角新村; 'Shek Wai Kok New Village'), since the construction of public housing estate, Shek Wai Kok Estate (石圍角邨).

== Administration ==
Shek Wai Kok is a recognized village under the New Territories Small House Policy.

== Features ==
Northern Shek Wai Kok attracts Taoist building their temples among the hills.

== Education ==
Shek Wai Kok is in Primary One Admission (POA) School Net 62, which includes schools in Tsuen Wan and areas nearby. The net includes multiple aided schools and one government school, Hoi Pa Street Government Primary School.
