= Wok Tai Wan =

Former bay of Hong Kong

Coordinates: 22.3527°N 114.0808°E

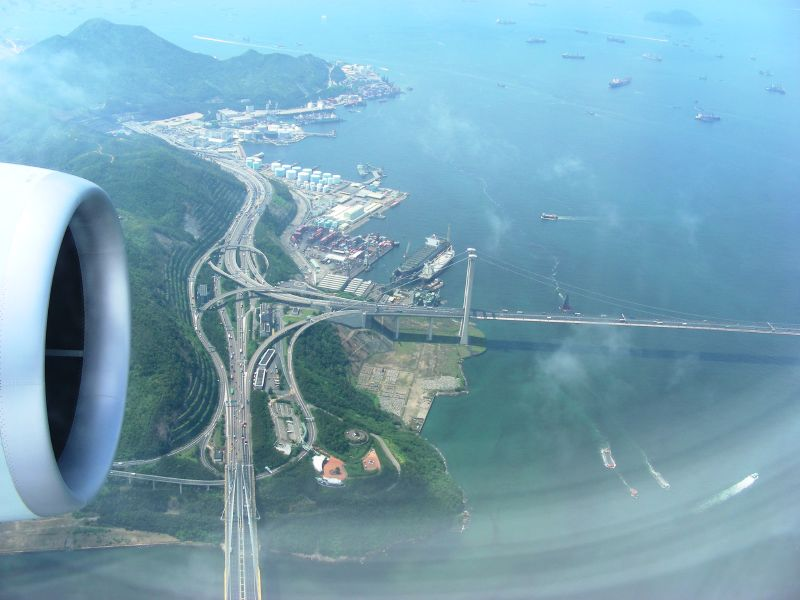
Aerial view of the eastern end of Tsing Ma Bridge, showing the reclaimed bay of Wok Tai Wan.

Wok Tai Wan (Chinese: 鑊底灣; lit. 'Bay of the Wok Bottom') was a bay on the northwest coast of Tsing Yi Island, Hong Kong. The beach in the bay was once a naturist resort. The difficulties involved in getting to the bay on foot with its high surrounding hills, or by small boat because of turbulence in the nearby sea, made it an ideal place for nudists to swim and sunbathe. Because of the resort, the bay once became an attraction for hikers even after the activities ceased.

Wok Tai in Cantonese means the bottom of the wok, a round-bottom pan. The bay is thus named because its wok shape.

== Nudism ==
In 1932, Herbert Edward Lanepart (林伯氏), a Latvian believed to be of German origin, set up a nudist club by a river in Heung Fan Liu (香粉寮) in Sha Tin District. The club moved to Wok Tai Wan in 1936, because the lease on Heung Fan Liu was expiring and the building of Shing Mun Reservoir in 1935 had lowered the level of the river and made the water murky.

Between 1938 and 1941, he used his boat to take his nudist club members to the bay to continue their gathering. The number of members reached its height at around 20.

During the Japanese occupation of Hong Kong (1941–1945), he lost his boat and the club's activities were interrupted. He rented boats instead to take the members to the bay and reformed his club as a sunbathing club 1950s.

On 1 January 1968, all nudist activities halted owing to insufficient participants.

== Tsing Ma Bridge ==
The bay remained largely silent in the 1970s and 1980s, and only occasionally explorers came to find its past.

The bay became more accessible when Hongkong United Dockyards (HUD) was built closer to the bay in 1976. Tsing Yi Road was extended to the dockyard.

The early 1990s saw construction of the Tsing Ma Bridge, an integral part of the Port and Airport Development Strategy. The suspension bridge spans from the hill at the back of Wok Tai Wan. Wok Tai Wan was reclaimed for building one of the two towers of the bridge and for a pier supporting the road from the tower to the hill.
