= Tai Wai Nullah =

River of Hong Kong

Coordinates: 22.378912°N 114.176518°E

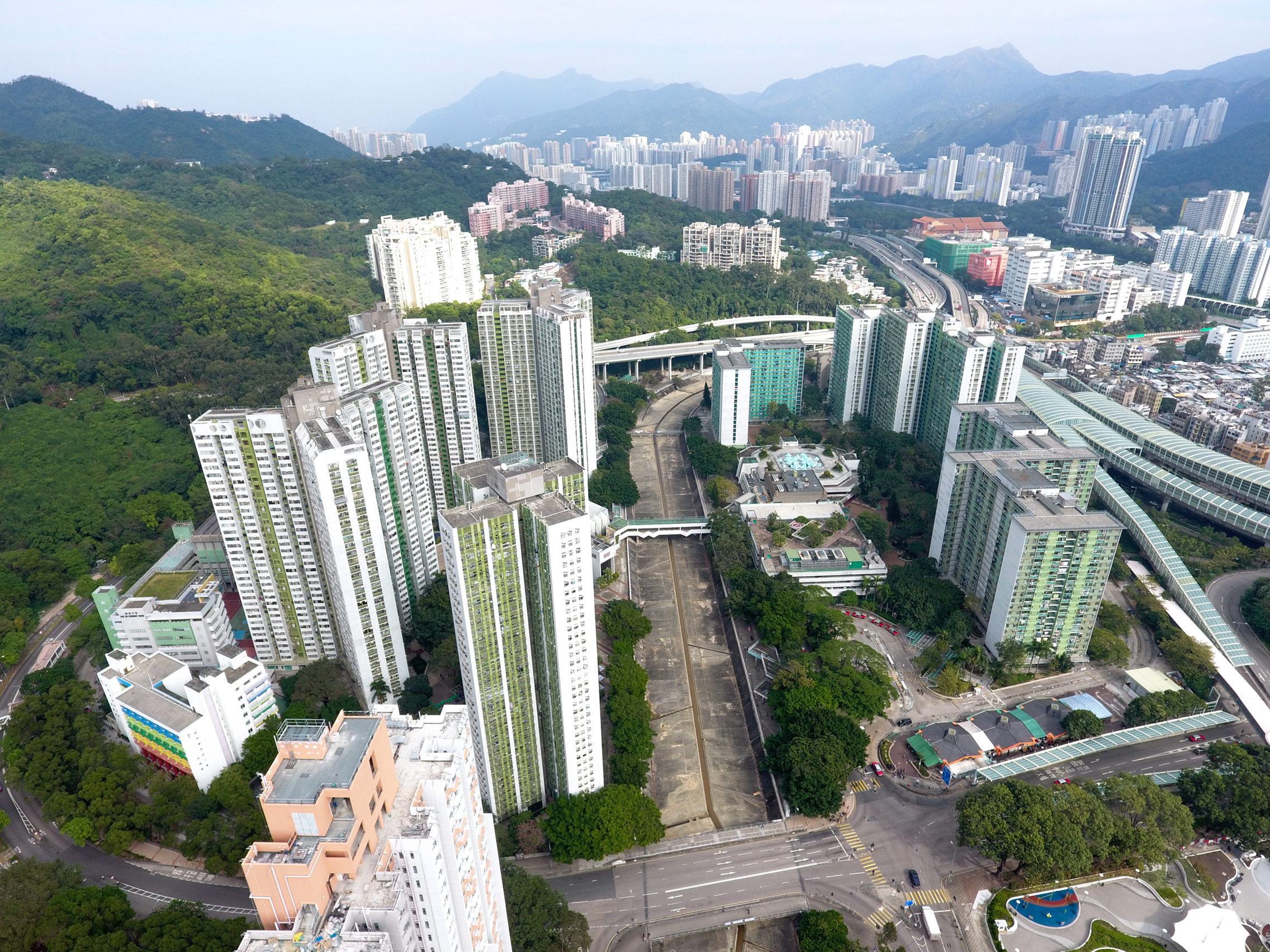
Tai Wai Nullah (centre) passing through Mei Lam Estate.

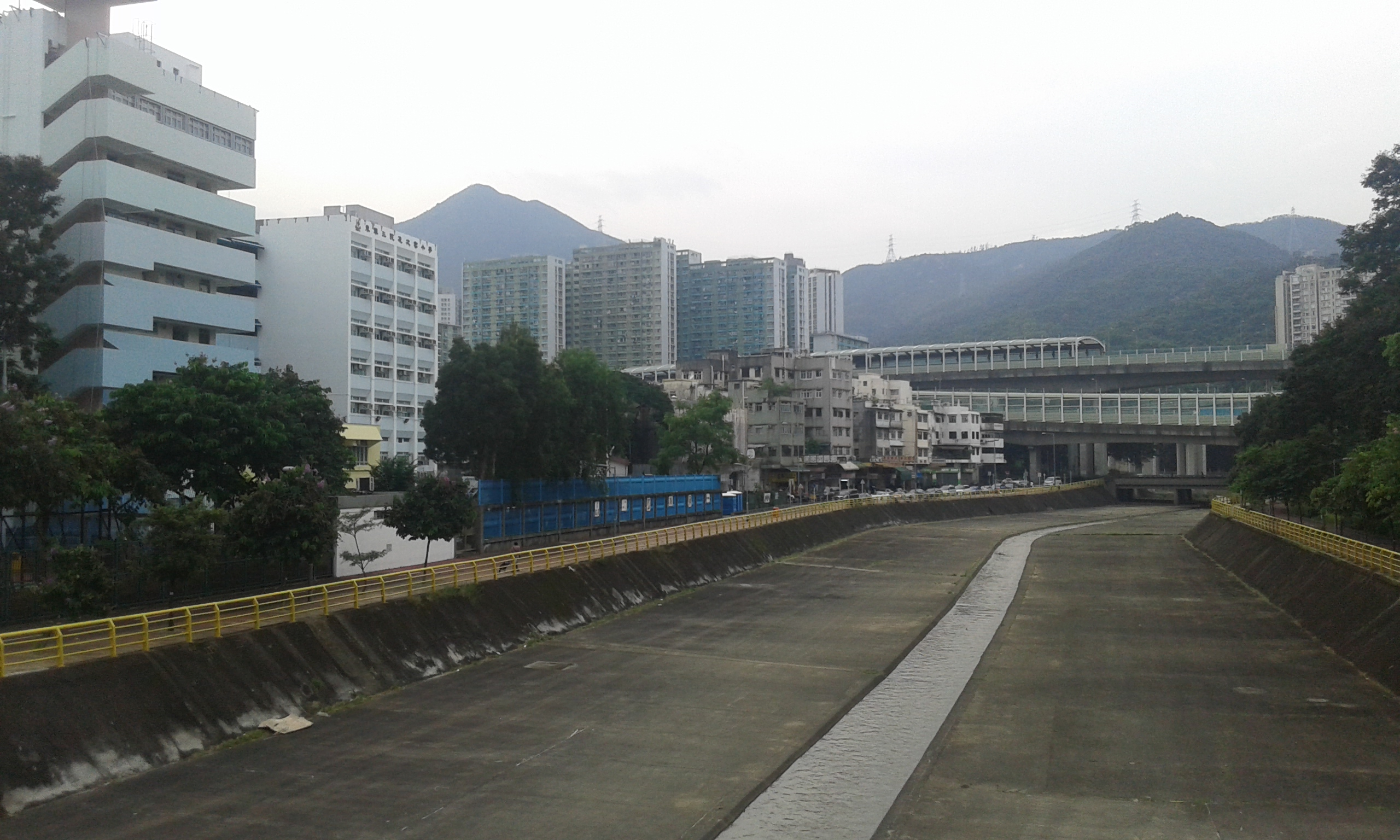
Tai Wai Nullah passing through Tai Wai.

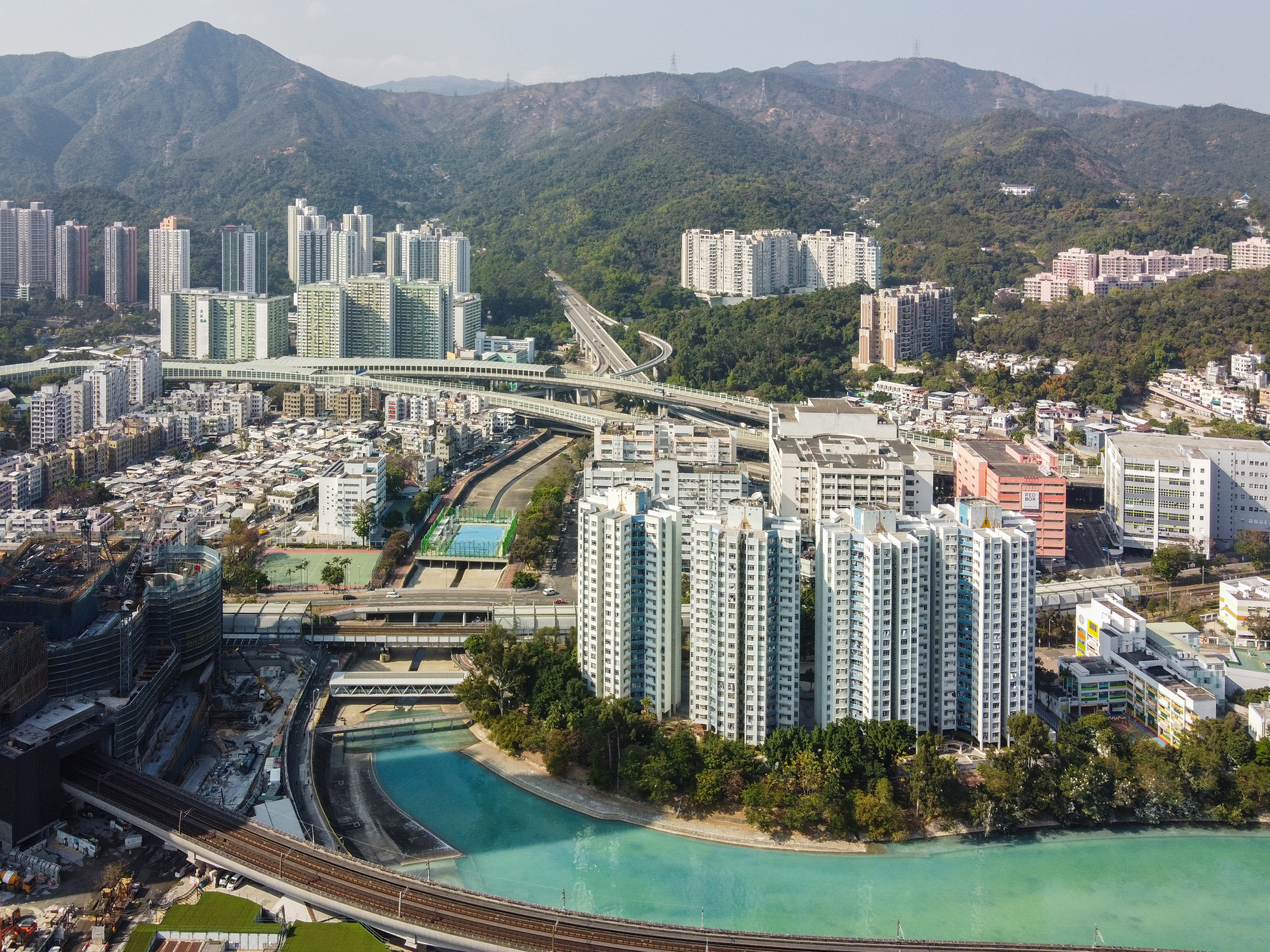
Junction of Tai Wai Nullah and Shing Mun River.

Tai Wai Nullah (Chinese: 大圍明渠), sometimes referred to as the upper stream of Shing Mun River, is one of the nullahs of Shing Mun River in Tai Wai of Hong Kong.

The channelised nullah has a width of about 39 m (128 ft). As water flow is very low most of the time, the concrete nullah bed is exposed.

== See also ==
- List of rivers and nullahs in Hong Kong
