= H Block (Hong Kong) =

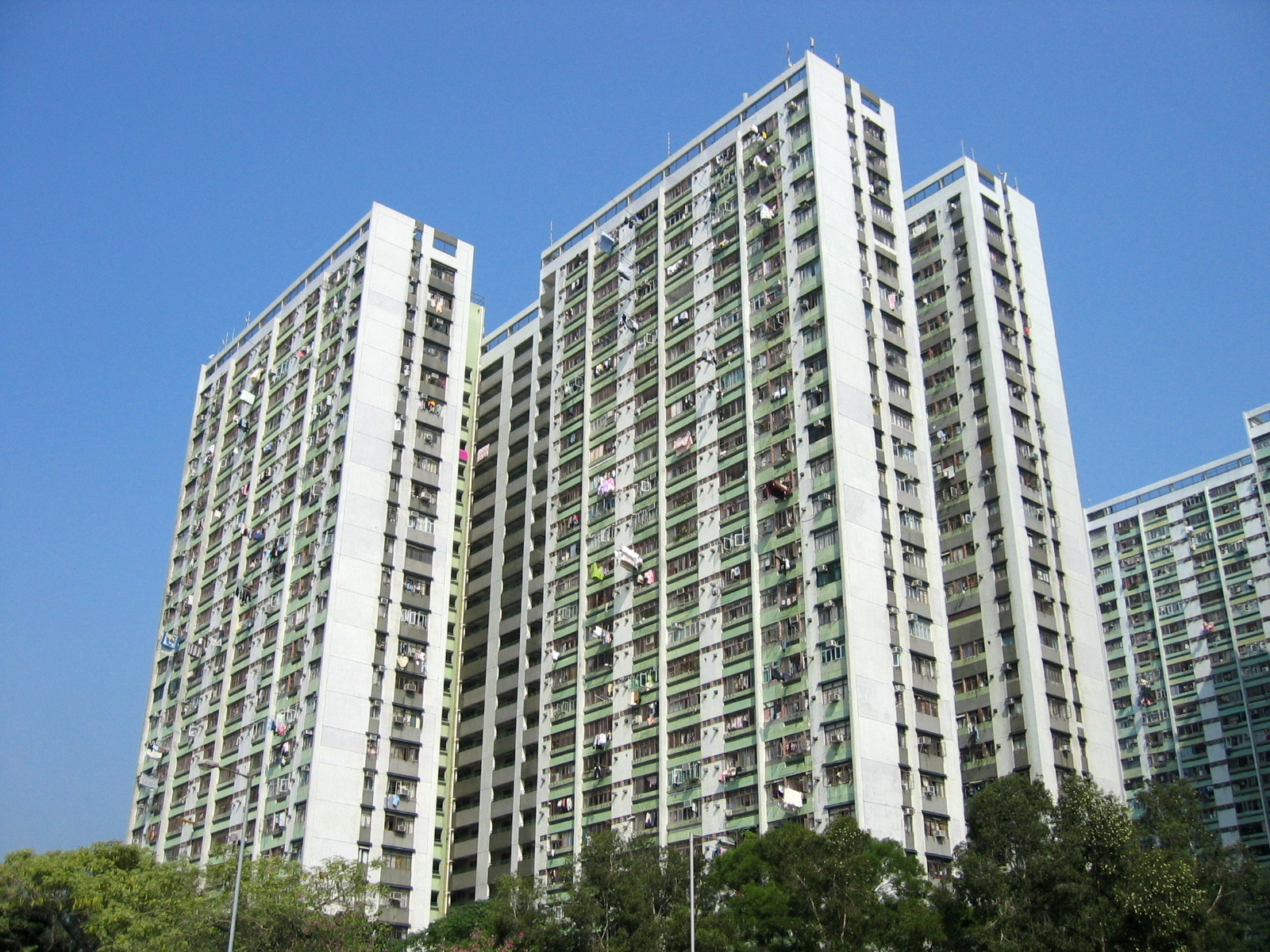
Sun Chui Estate

H Blocks (Chinese: 工字型大厦) is a 1970s block design in Hong Kong. Most of the blocks are constructed as public housing.

== Overview ==
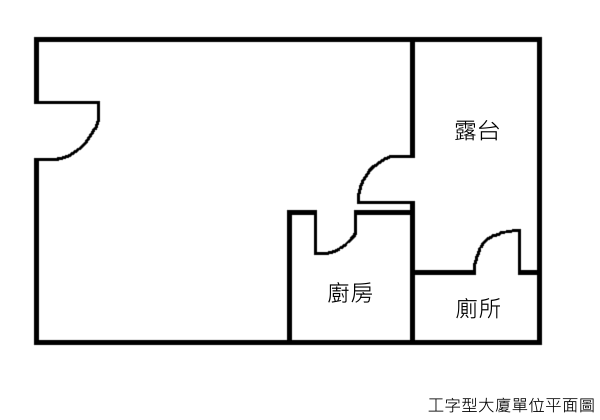
Floor plan of a 7-person unit.

H Blocks are usually 26 to 28 stories in height. A unit inside a H block is large. The largest of these units is a flat 93.9 square meters in area in the 2nd floor of Pok On House in Pok Hong Estate. There are three wings. Two of them have units while one is used as a lobby. There are 15 units per floor.

== Types ==
There are three types of H-Shaped Blocks: Single H, Double H, and Triple H.

=== Features ===
The biggest unit could accommodate up to 11 people. It is only found in the following places: Chun Shek Estate, Tung Tau Estate, Lower Wong Tai Sin Estate, Choi Wan Estate, Cheung Hong Estate, Wan Tsui Estate, and in Shui Pin Wai Estate.

=== Single H ===
Single H consists of only one H block. It only has 15 units per floor.

=== Double H ===
Double H is a type of H Block where two H-shaped blocks are combined. They are called “low and high” blocks. The room in the middle is the garbage room. It is typically locked. There are 29 units per floor.

=== Triple H ===
Triple H is another type where three H-shaped blocks are combined. It consists of 2 low blocks and 1 high block. There are 43 units per floor.

== Evolution ==
The first generation contained a 8-person units and a 5-person unit at the end of each wing. The second generation contained 7, 8 and 9-person units.

== List of blocks ==
(to be completed)

== Gallery ==
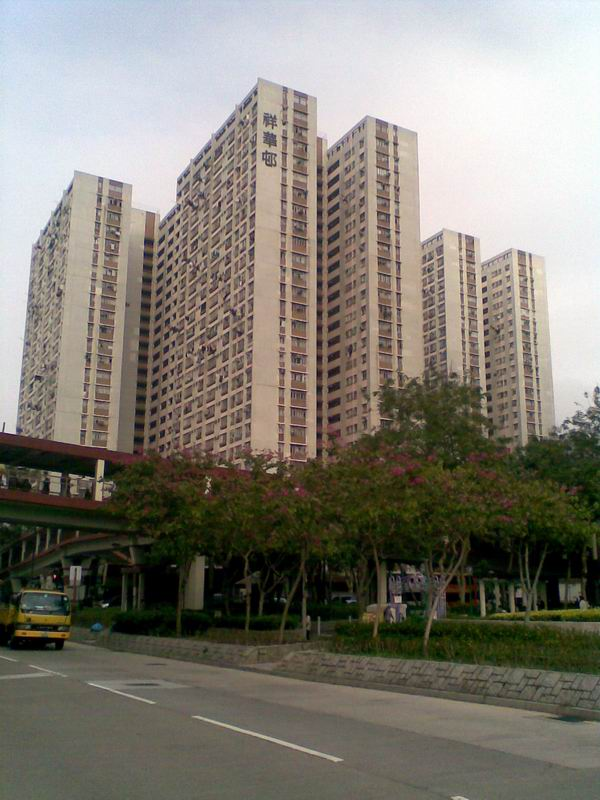
Cheung Wah Estate

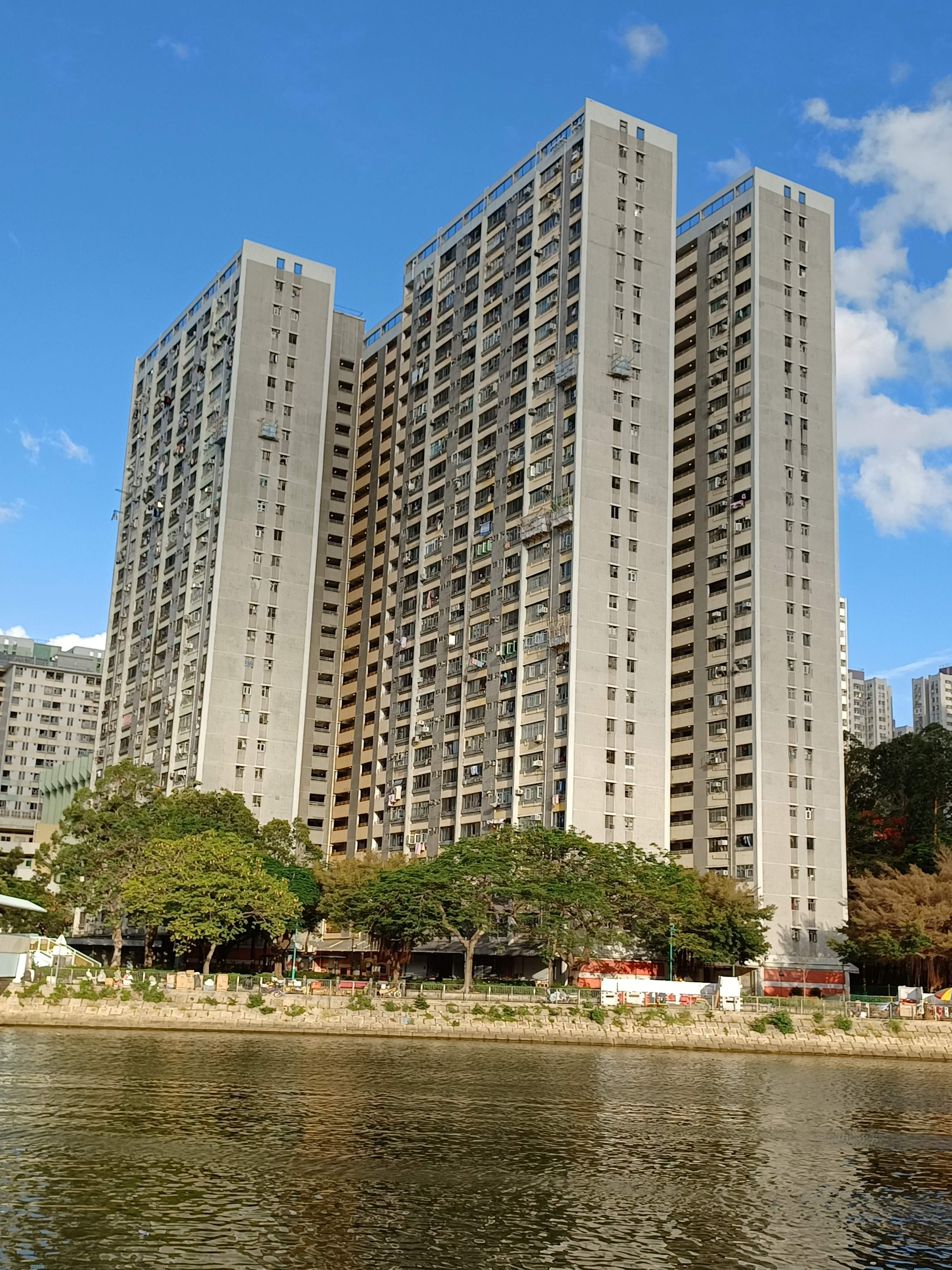
Yau Oi Estate

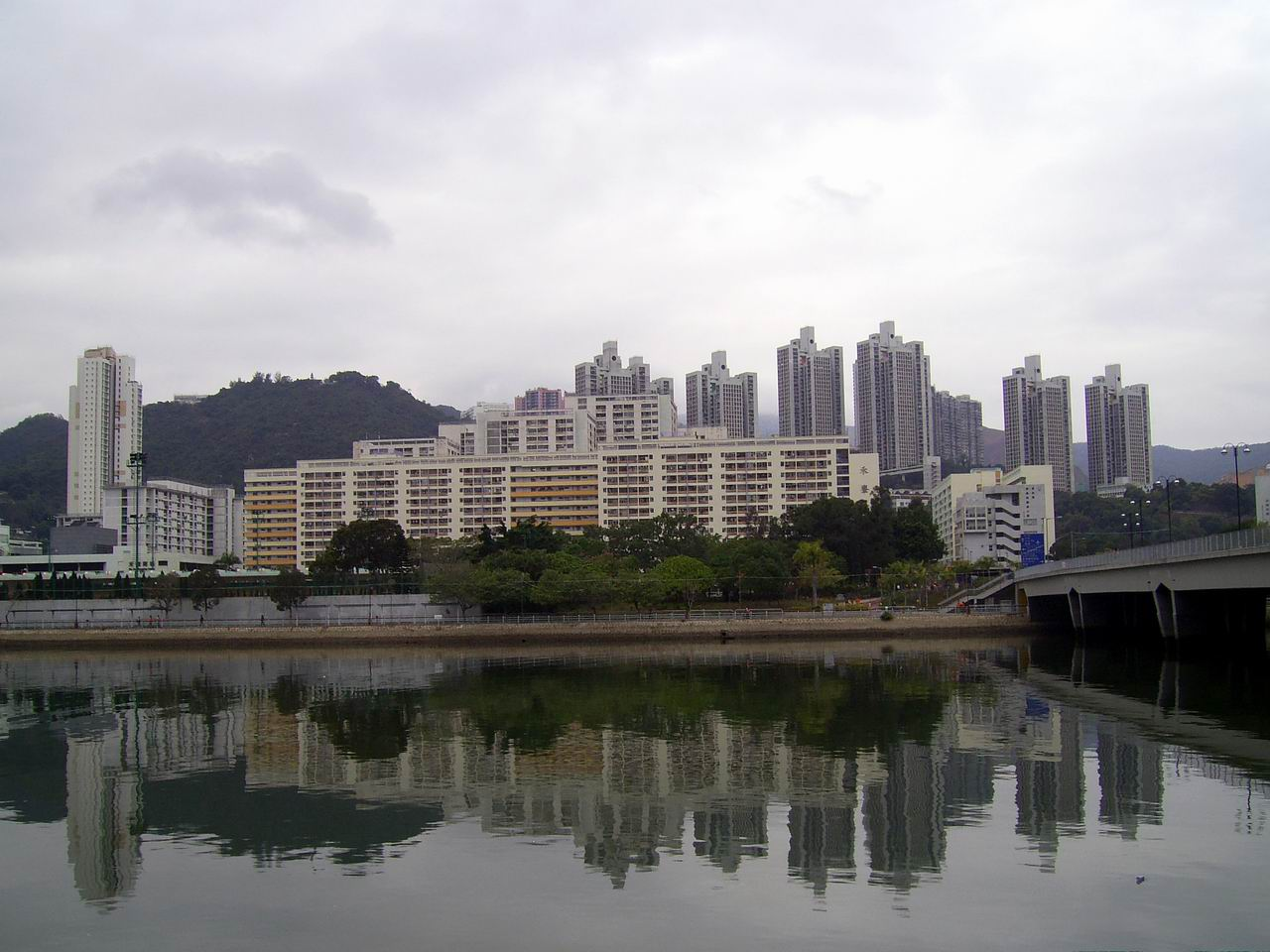
Wo Che Estate

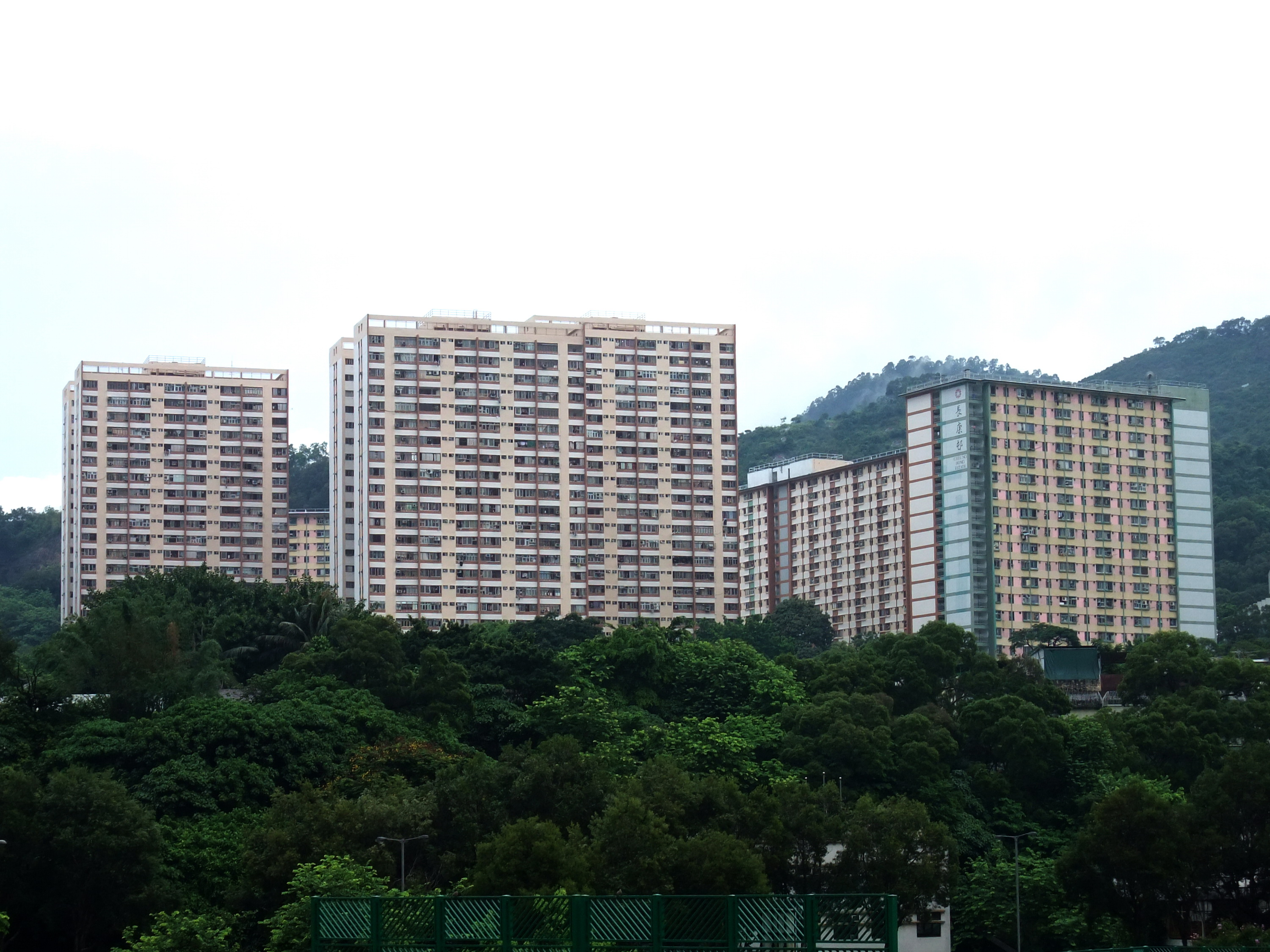
Cheung Hong Estate

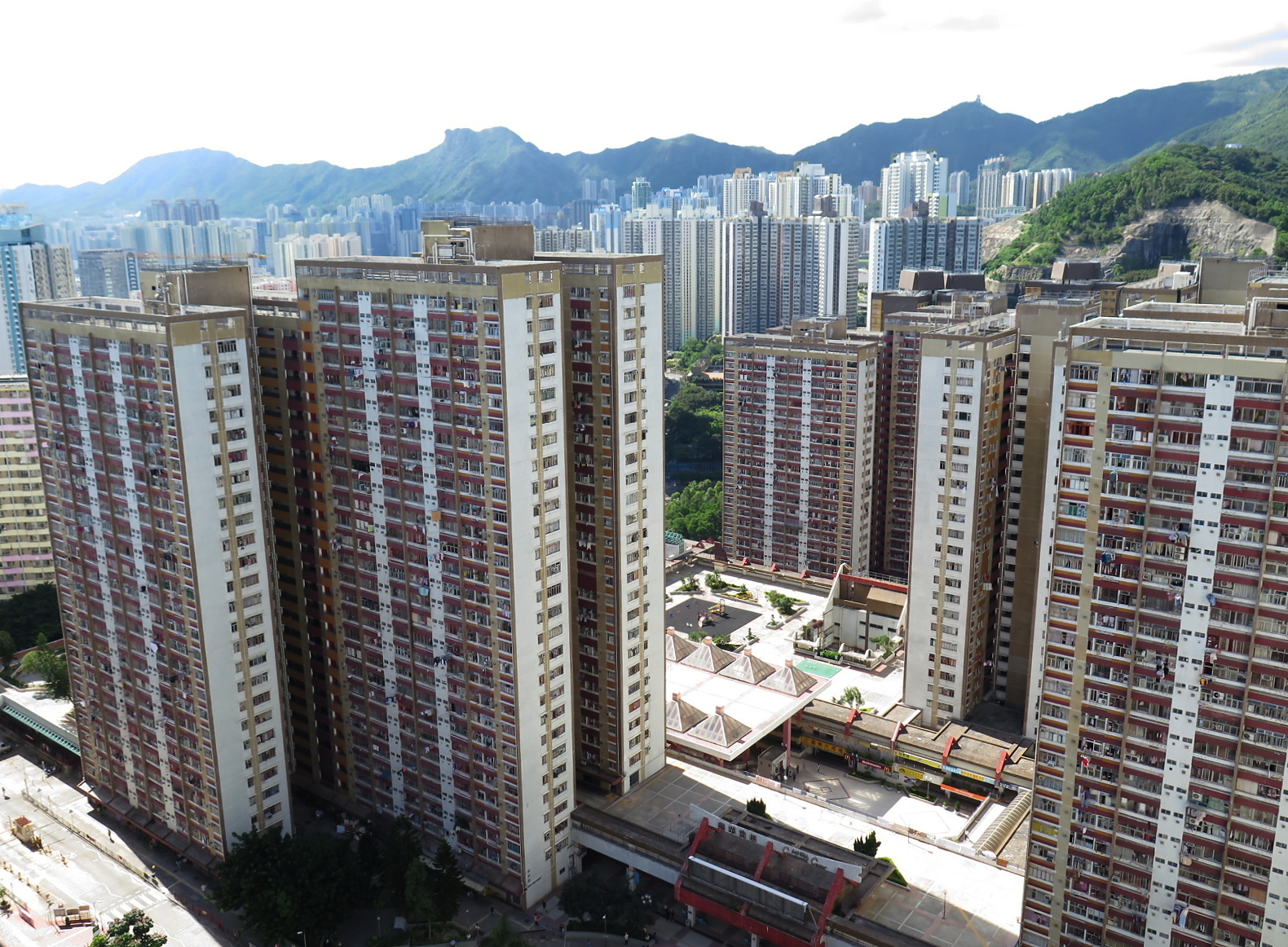
Lok Wah Estate

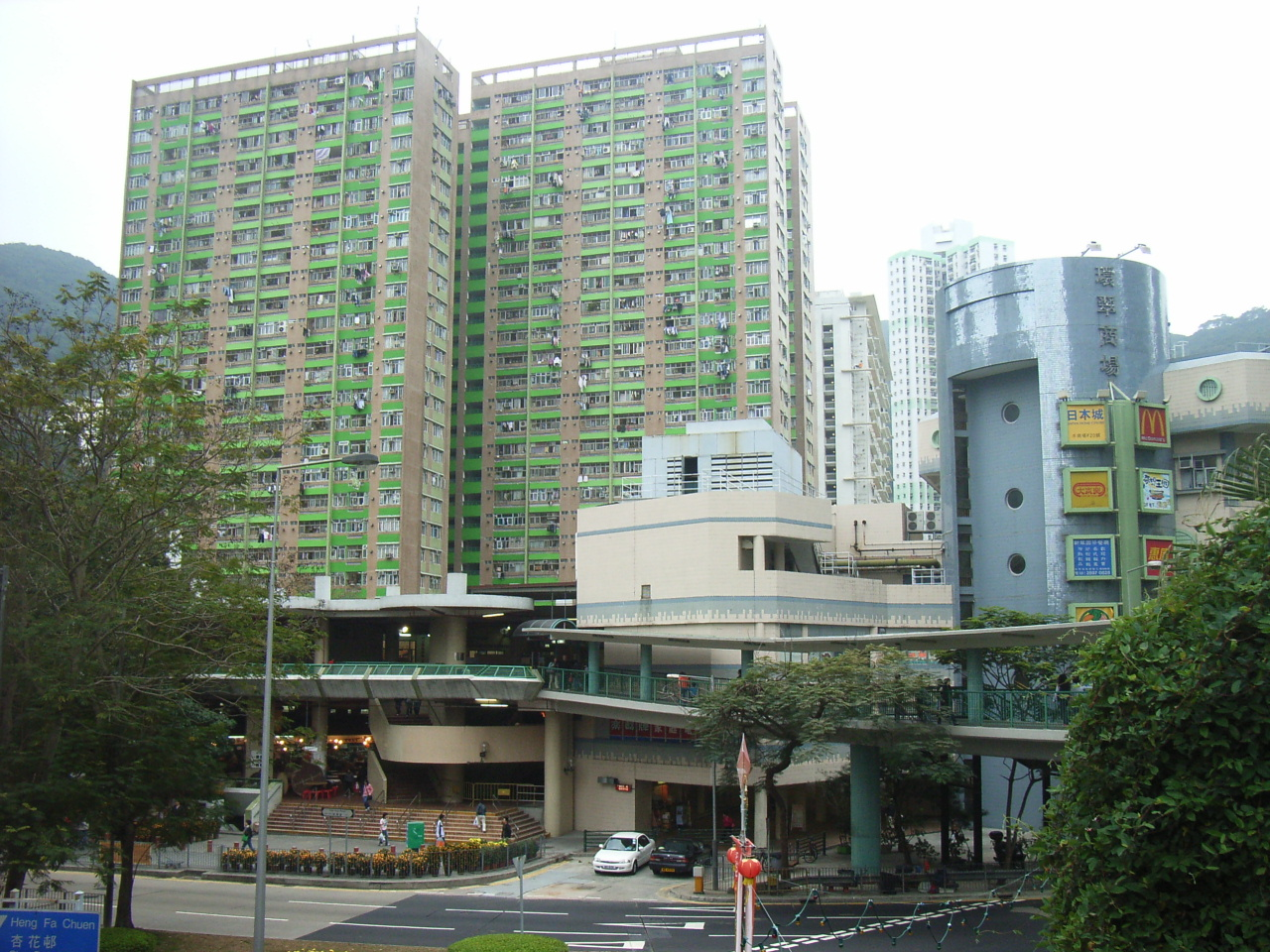
Wan Tsui Estate

== See also ==
- Types of public housing estate blocks in Hong Kong
