= Po Lam (disambiguation) =

Po Lam is a neighbourhood in Tseung Kwan O, New Territories, Hong Kong.

Po Lam may also refer to:

- Po Lam (constituency), a constituency in Sai Kung District
- Po Lam Estate, a public housing estate in Tseung Kwan O
- Po Lam station, a MTR station on the Tseung Kwan O line
