= Junk Bay =

- Tseung Kwan O
- 將軍澳 (Chinese)
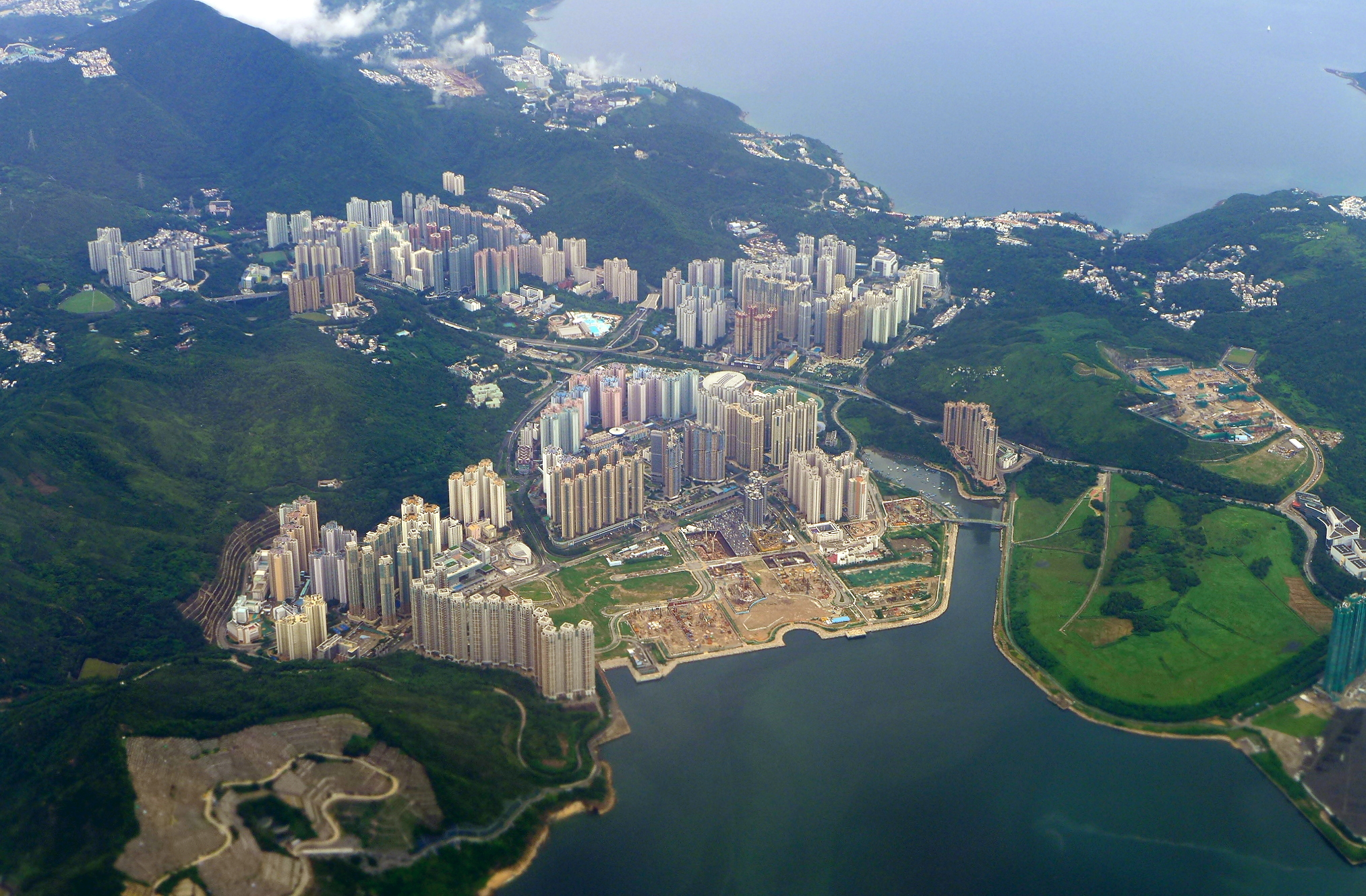
- Aerial view of Junk Bay, with Tseung Kwan O Industrial Estate on the right. The waters at the top of the picture are part of Port Shelter.

- Location within Hong Kong
- Location: Sai Kung District, New Territories, Hong Kong
- Coordinates: 22.29°N 114.26°E
- Type: Bay

Tseung Kwan O
- Traditional Chinese: 將軍澳
- Simplified Chinese: 将军澳
- Cantonese Yale: jēung gwān ou
- Literal meaning: General's Bay
Transcriptions
Standard Mandarin
- Hanyu Pinyin: Jiāngjūn'ào
Yue: Cantonese
- Yale Romanization: jēung gwān ou
- Jyutping: Zoeng1 gwan1 ou3
- IPA: [tsœ́ːŋ kʷɐ́n ʔōu]

Junk Bay, also known by its Chinese transliteration Tseung Kwan O or Cheung Kwan O (Chinese: 將軍澳); is a bay in Sai Kung District, New Territories, Hong Kong. In the northern tip of the bay lies the Tseung Kwan O Village.

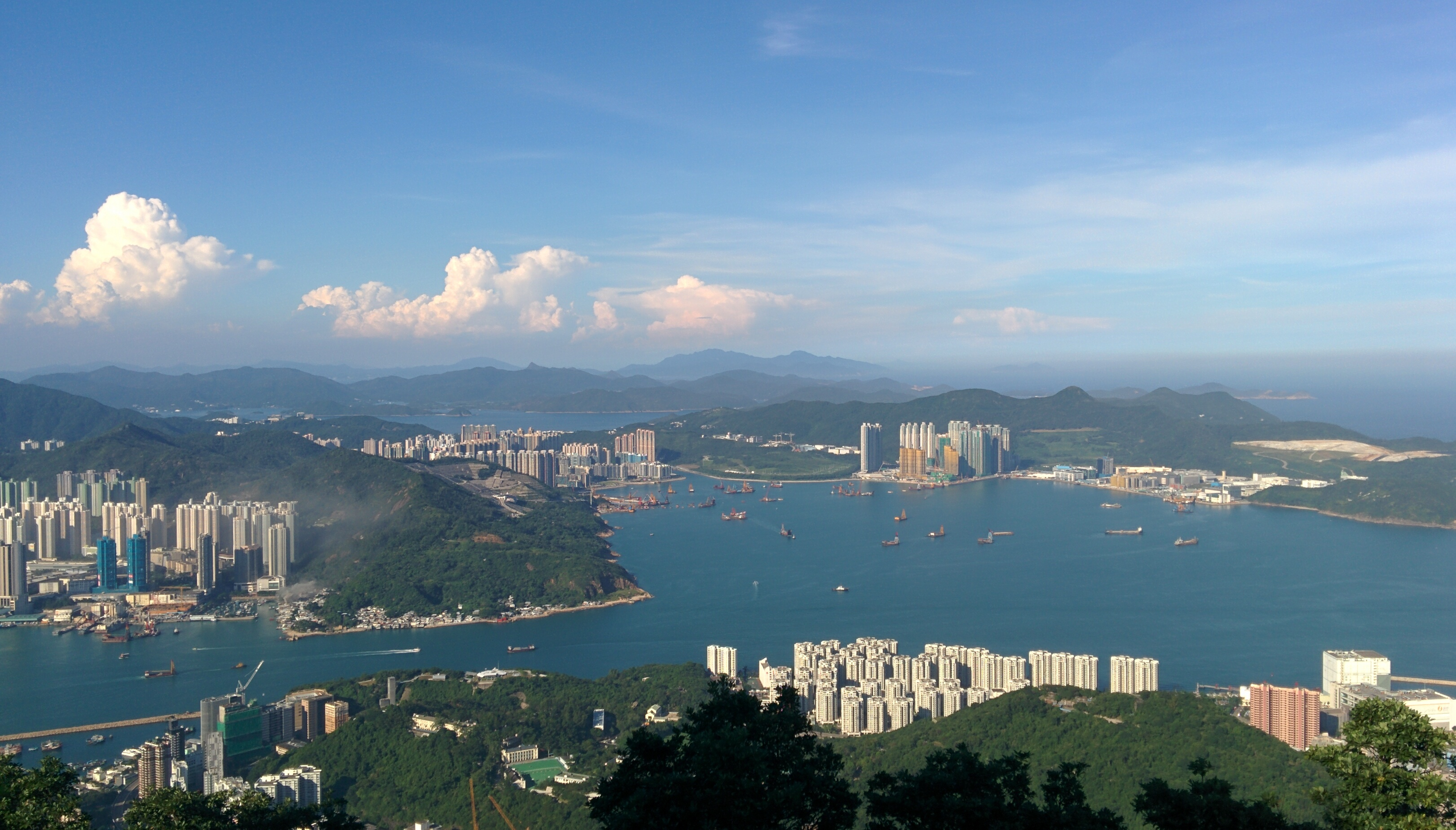
View of Junk Bay (Tseung Kwan O) in 2019

The Tseung Kwan O New Town, one of the nine new towns in Hong Kong, was mainly built on reclaimed land in the northern half of the bay. The population as of 2011 is about 368,000.

== Name ==
In Cantonese, Tseung Kwan (將軍) means the "general" of an army, and O (澳) means "bay". Therefore, Tseung Kwan O literally means "General's Bay".

The exact origin of the name Tseung Kwan O is unknown, but it is said to be named in honour of a Ming dynasty soldier who visited Tseung Kwan O at some point. Another theory is that the name was chosen in the 17th century, when naval battles were fought against pirates from Japan at Tseung Kwan O. Yet another theory is that the pronunciation of "將軍" can sound like "Junk Wan" to the ears of English speakers; wan is also a transliteration of the Chinese word for "bay" (灣).

The current town center of Tseung Kwan O stands on reclaimed land. The English name Junk Bay was said to be derived from the existence of junks in the bay, and the reclamation land based on the landfill. The landfill did not exist when the bay was first named, so "junk" very likely refers only to ships, not the detritus deposited there in recent years. This seems to be a common misconception. The first landfill was opened in 1978, decades after Junk Bay was named. The Fat Tong Chau (Junk Island) is in the southeastern part of the bay.

== History and geography ==
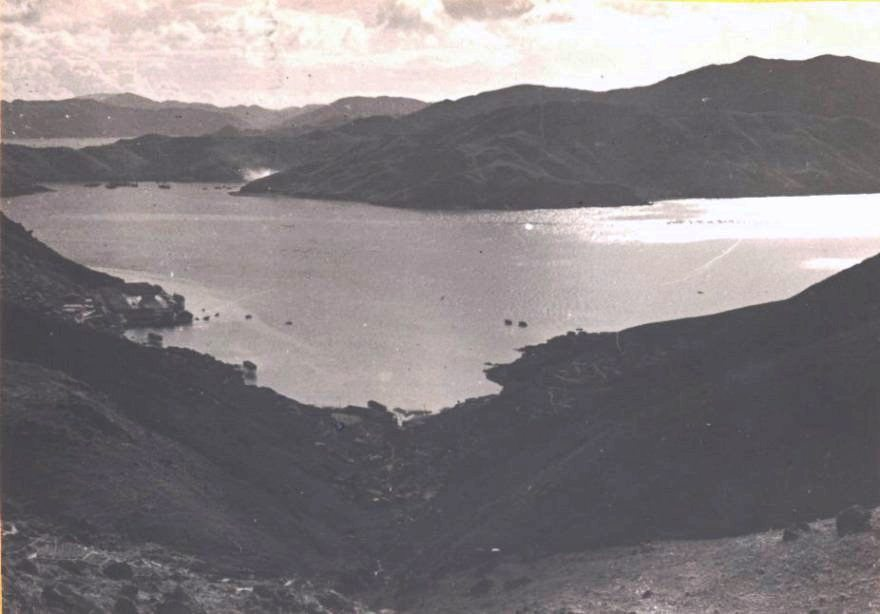
Junk Bay in 1950s

The bay is near the eastern mouth of Hong Kong's Victoria Harbour. A local gazette, Genuine record of Guangdong province (Chinese: 粵大記), clearly contained the place name: 將軍澳 (Tseung Kwan O). A genuine record of Guangdong province was published during the Ming dynasty: Residents inhabited Tseung Kwan O area then.

Before the development of the new town, the area around the bay was occupied by fishing towns and villages. Settlements in the area began as early as in the 13th century. Major settlements, however, did not occur until the late 16th century when small fishing villages were founded in the area. Hang Hau quickly emerged into a market town and became the most populated and prosperous place in the whole of Clear Water Bay Peninsula; it continued for the next few centuries as such. Other towns and villages include Rennie's Mill (Tiu Keng Leng), Hang Hau and Yau Yue Wan. Rennie's Mill was where Kuomintang loyalists were settled following the end of the Chinese Civil War, and Hang Hau had a ship-building industry.

The Hong Kong Government had been interested in developing a new town at Hang Hau because of its proximity to the urban area. The project was postponed for a long time owing to the extensive scale of reclamation in the bay, which is rather deep. It finally started under the name of Tseung Kwan O. The area of Tseung Kwan O is about 1,790 ha, with a projected population of 490,000 upon completion.

Tseung Kwan O today comprises five main areas: Po Lam, Hang Hau, Tseung Kwan O, Tiu Keng Leng and LOHAS Park. All 5 have MTR stations.

== Climate ==
Climate data for Tseung Kwan O (1992–2016)
Month	Jan	Feb	Mar	Apr	May	Jun	Jul	Aug	Sep	Oct	Nov	Dec	Year
Record high °C (°F)	28.0 (82.4)	28.5 (83.3)	29.6 (85.3)	31.8 (89.2)	34.4 (93.9)	35.5 (95.9)	36.4 (97.5)	37.6 (99.7)	35.8 (96.4)	34.5 (94.1)	32.1 (89.8)	28.8 (83.8)	37.6 (99.7)
Mean daily maximum °C (°F)	18.4 (65.1)	19.0 (66.2)	20.9 (69.6)	24.6 (76.3)	28.0 (82.4)	30.2 (86.4)	31.3 (88.3)	31.3 (88.3)	30.2 (86.4)	28.0 (82.4)	24.6 (76.3)	20.4 (68.7)	25.6 (78.1)
Daily mean °C (°F)	15.4 (59.7)	16.2 (61.2)	18.3 (64.9)	22.0 (71.6)	25.4 (77.7)	27.5 (81.5)	28.3 (82.9)	28.0 (82.4)	27.0 (80.6)	24.8 (76.6)	21.5 (70.7)	17.1 (62.8)	22.6 (72.7)
Mean daily minimum °C (°F)	13.0 (55.4)	14.1 (57.4)	16.3 (61.3)	20.1 (68.2)	23.4 (74.1)	25.5 (77.9)	25.9 (78.6)	25.6 (78.1)	24.8 (76.6)	22.5 (72.5)	19.1 (66.4)	14.5 (58.1)	20.4 (68.7)
Record low °C (°F)	2.1 (35.8)	4.3 (39.7)	7.0 (44.6)	9.8 (49.6)	15.1 (59.2)	19.9 (67.8)	21.9 (71.4)	22.4 (72.3)	19.2 (66.6)	14.4 (57.9)	8.9 (48.0)	4.0 (39.2)	2.1 (35.8)
Average precipitation mm (inches)	33.2 (1.31)	50.5 (1.99)	78.1 (3.07)	151.5 (5.96)	304.0 (11.97)	508.8 (20.03)	382.8 (15.07)	424.2 (16.70)	302.8 (11.92)	95.0 (3.74)	47.4 (1.87)	28.3 (1.11)	2,406.6 (94.75)
Average relative humidity (%)	73	80	82	86	86	86	83	85	81	75	74	70	80
Source: Hong Kong Observatory

== Development of Tseung Kwan O ==
In 1983, development of Phase I of the New Town to an initial population of about 175,000 was formally endorsed. By 1986, construction of the two tubes of the Tseung Kwan O Tunnel began, which provided potential for further increasing the population of the New Town. To maximize the utilization of the road infrastructure and to meet the demand for land for public housing, the Government decided that the New Town should include a Phase II development, with an increase in the projected population to about 325,000. To cater for redevelopment of the Tiu Keng Leng Cottage Area and to provide land for development of Tseung Kwan O Industrial Estate and deep waterfront industries, in 1988, the Government further decided to proceed with Phase III development of the New Town for about 490,000 people.

== Photo gallery ==
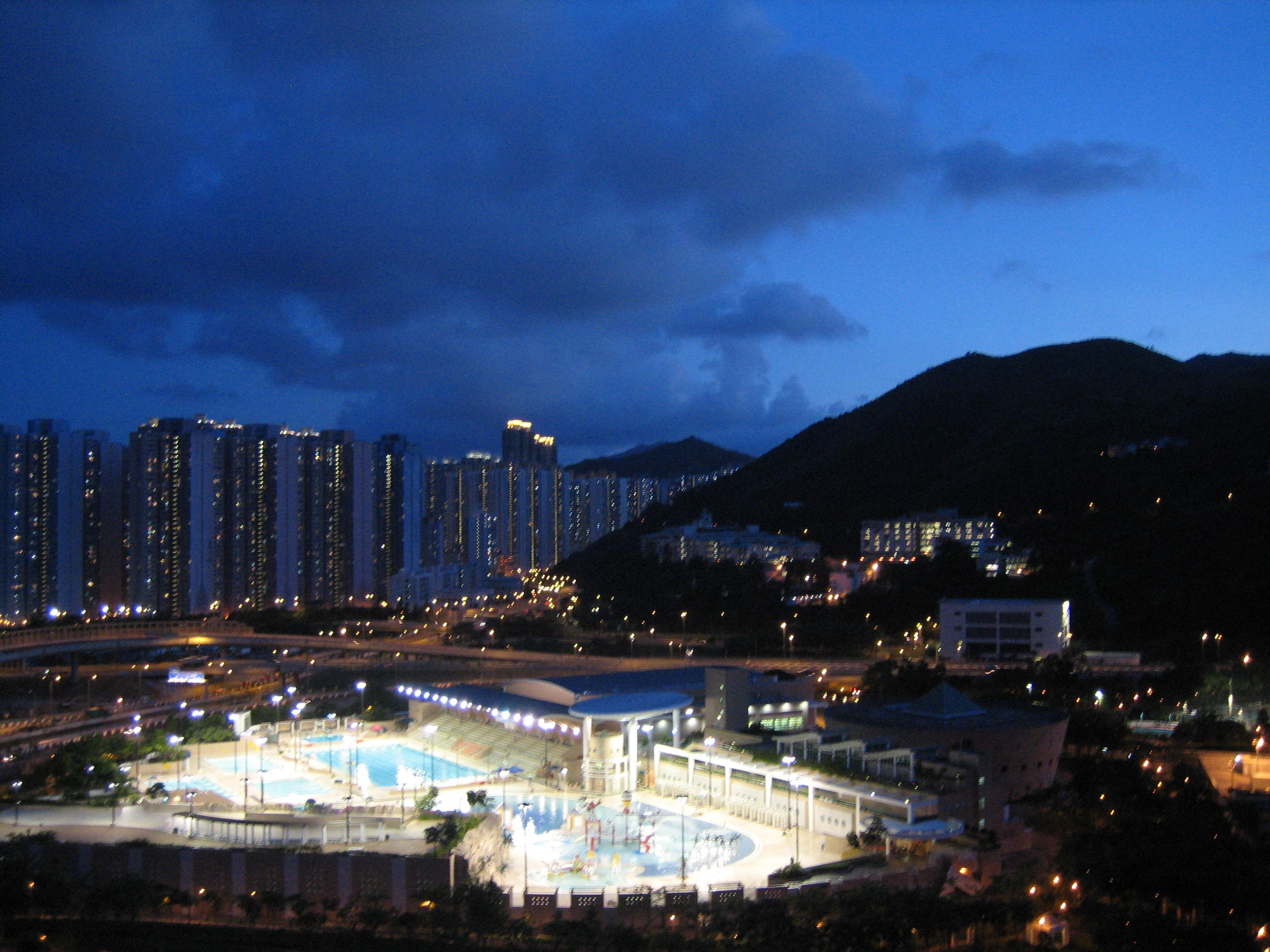
Tseung Kwan O Library at Dusk

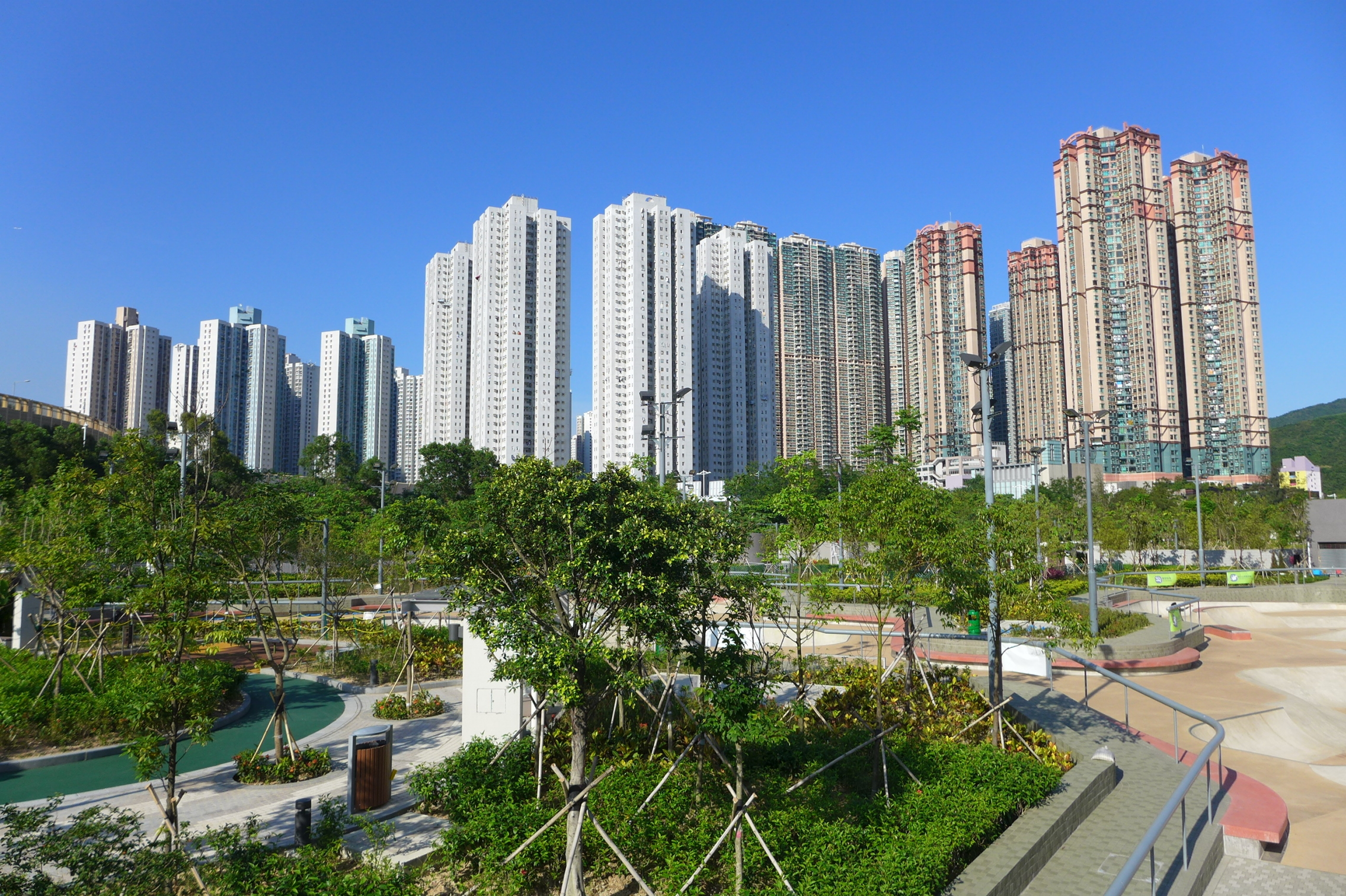
High density buildings in Hang Hau

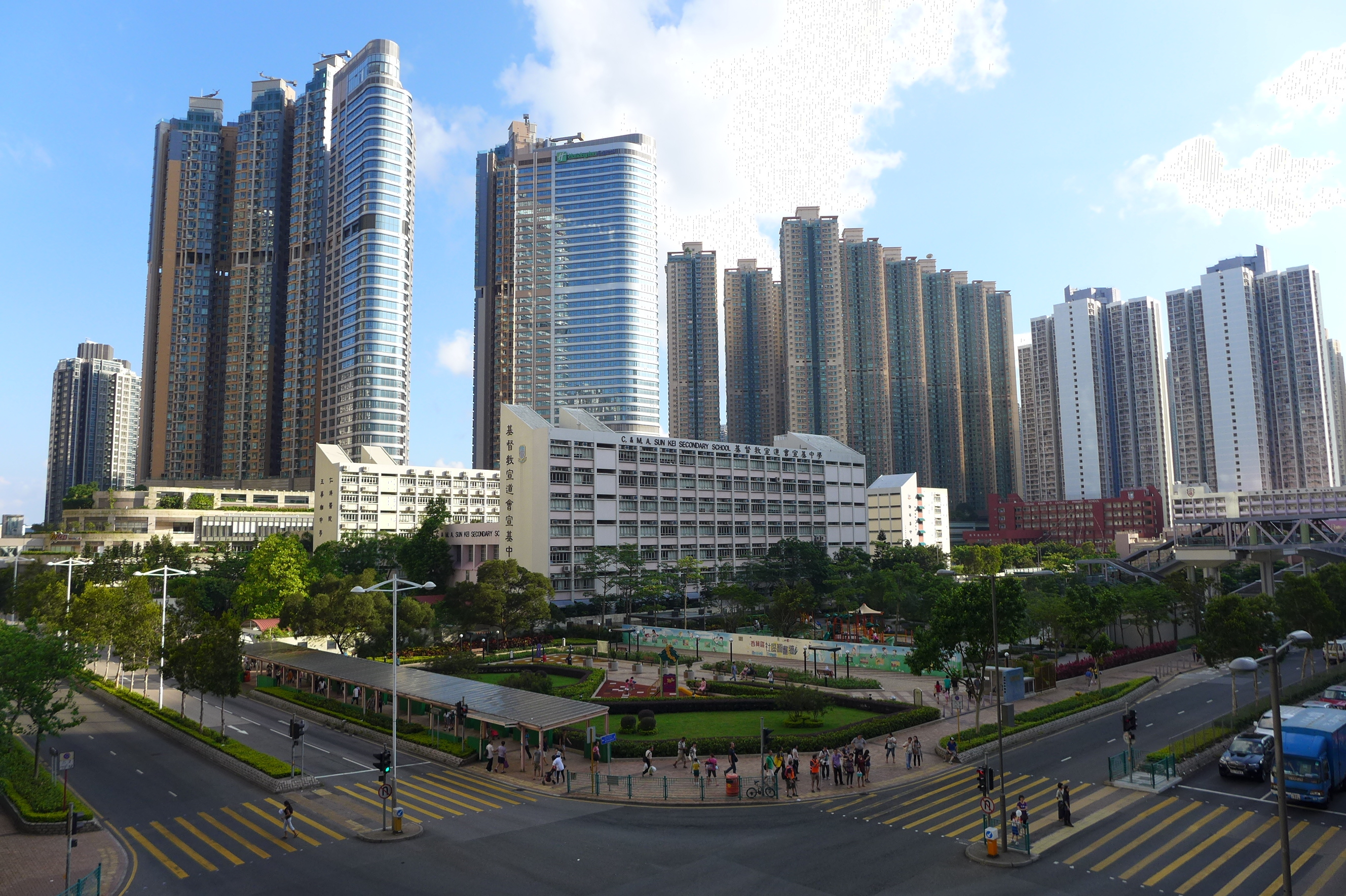
Tseung Kwan O Town Centre

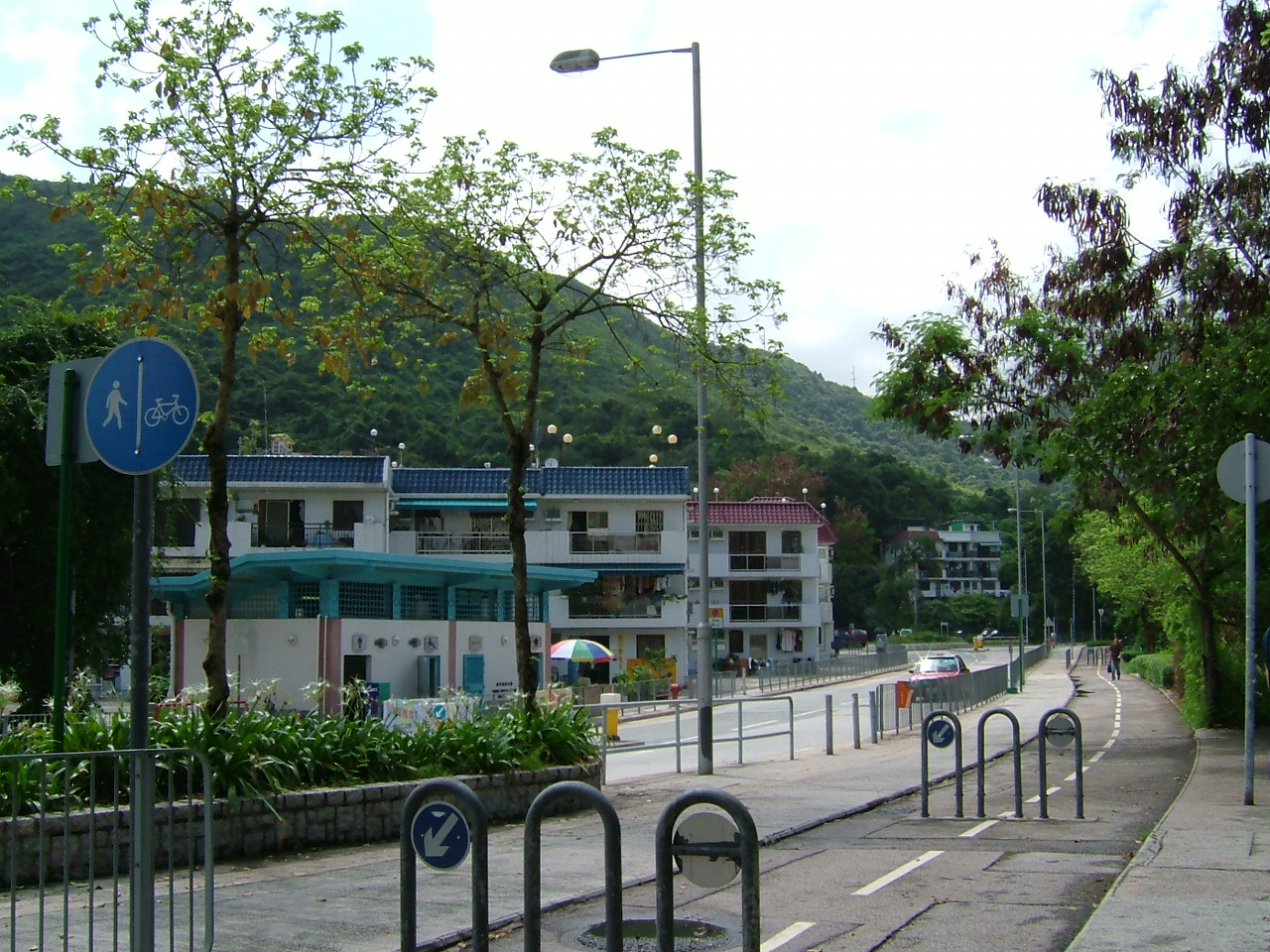
Tseung Kwan O Village

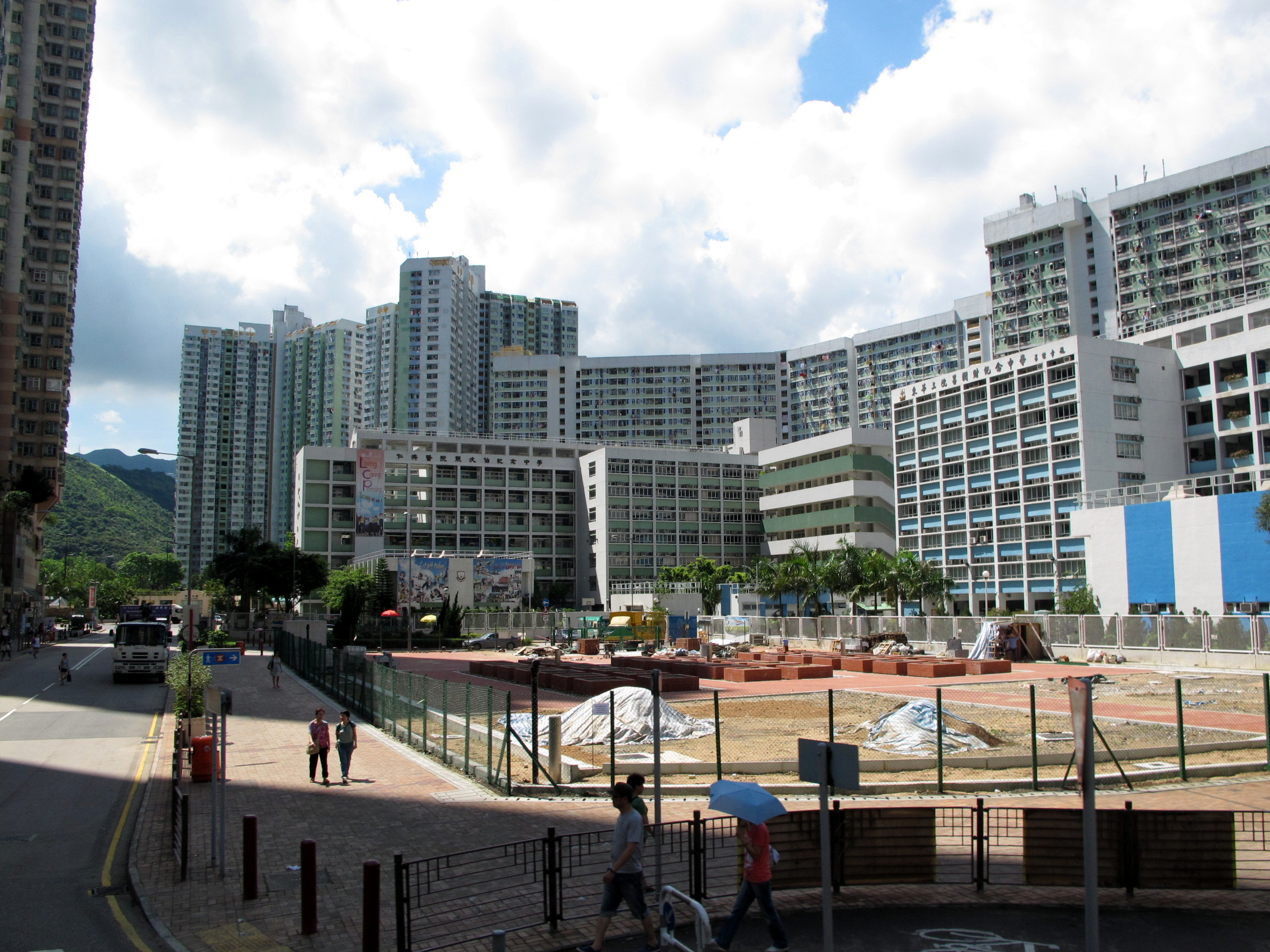
Po Lam Estate

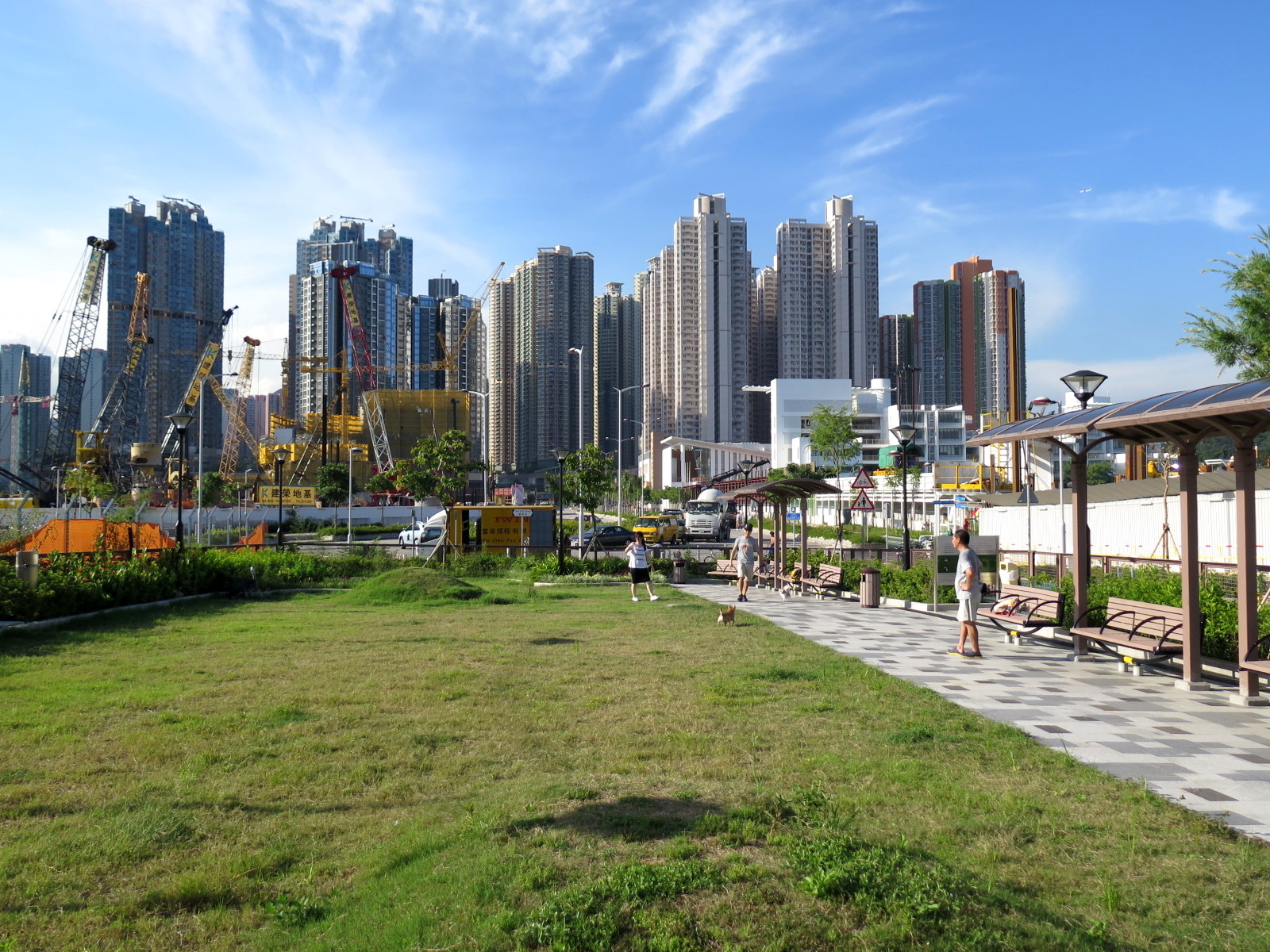
Tseung Kwan O South

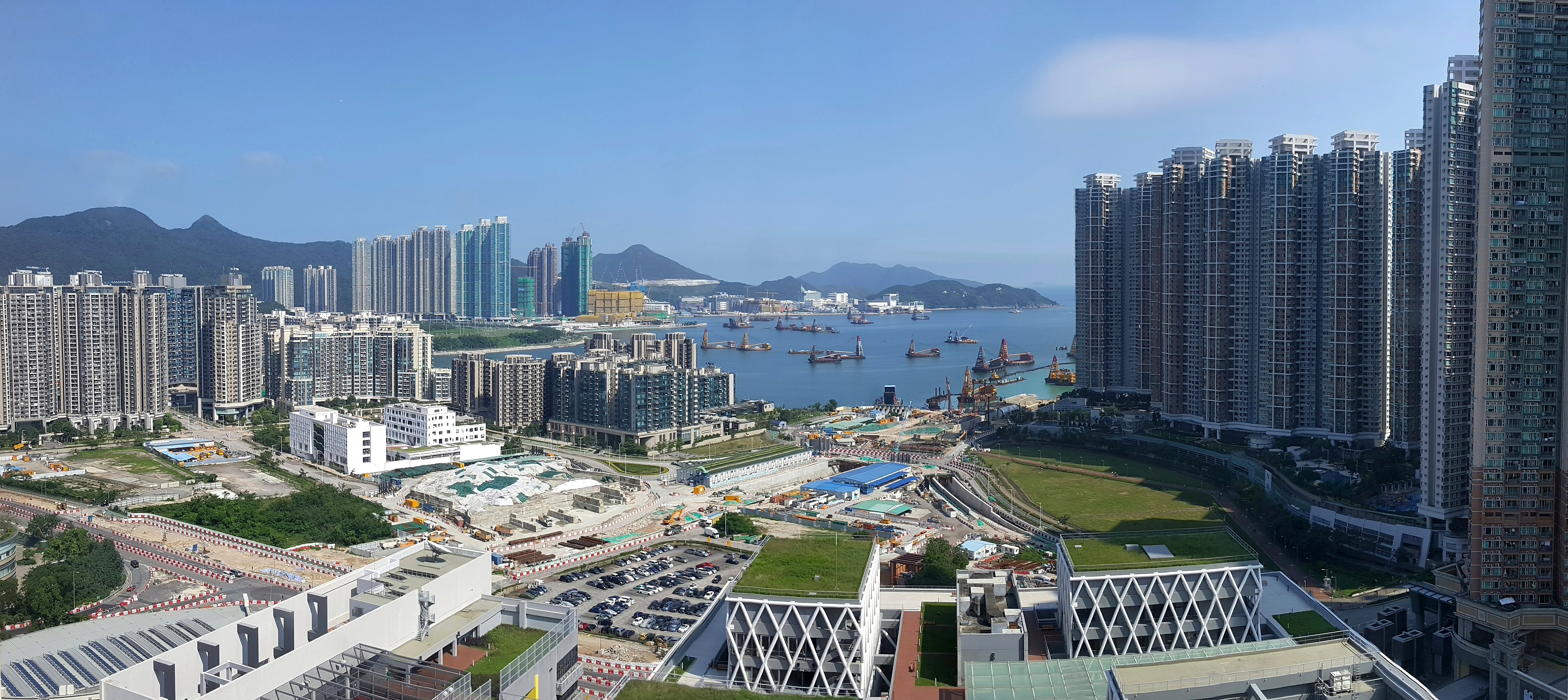
Tiu Keng Leng and Tseung Kwan O South

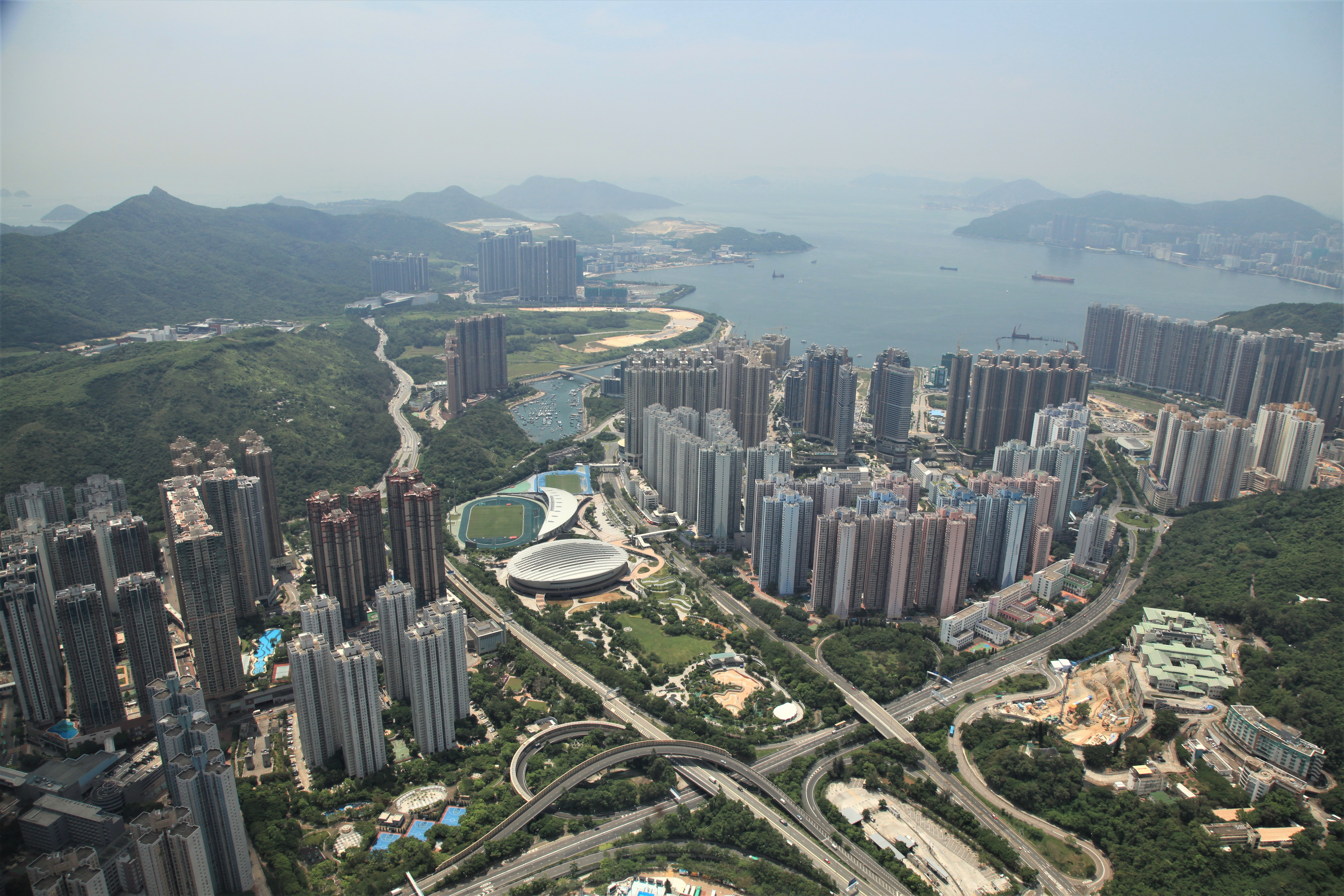
Above Tseung Kwan O

== See also ==
- List of bays in Hong Kong
- Tiu Keng Leng
- Po Lam
