= Po Lam =

Neighbourhood in northern Tseung Kwan O, Hong Kong

- Traditional Chinese: 寶琳/寶林
- Simplified Chinese: 宝琳/宝林
Transcriptions
Standard Mandarin
- Hanyu Pinyin: Bǎolín
Yue: Cantonese
- Yale Romanization: Bóu làhm
- Jyutping: Bou^{2} lam^{4}
- IPA: [pǒu lɐ̏m]

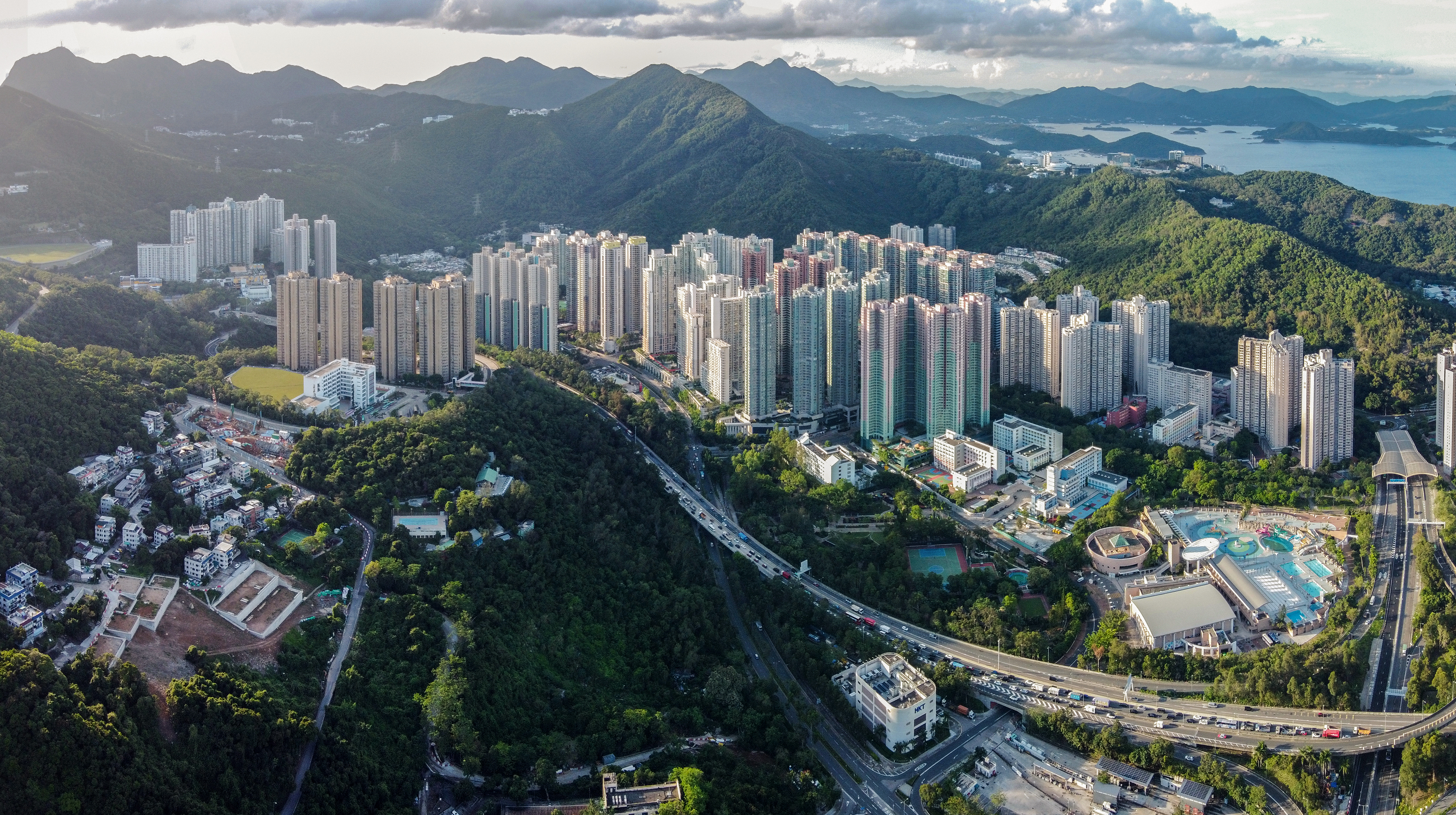
Po Lam

Po Lam (Chinese: 寶琳 or 寶林) is a neighbourhood in northern Tseung Kwan O, New Territories, Hong Kong. An MTR station with the same name, Tseung Kwan O Village, Yau Yue Wan Village, King Lam Estate, and Po Lam Estate are located there.

== Name ==
Po Lam is named after one of the first roads in Tseung Kwan O, the Po Lam Road, whose name was taken from the Chinese translation of the first name of Barbara B. Whitener (寶琳), Rev. Sterling H. Whitener's wife. Rev. Whitener was a missionary based at the Haven of Hope Tuberculosis Sanatorium (now Haven of Hope Hospital) at the time. When Po Lam Estate was under planning, it was named "寶林邨", with a different second character but pronounced in the same way. The Po Lam MTR station, on the contrary, used "琳". Government documents have used both names, referring to the area as "寶琳" in a brochure issued by the Planning Department, but also using "林" for the Po Lam Sports Centre within Po Lam Estate. Residents generally use both name interchangeably.

== History ==
Same as Hang Hau, Po Lam was developed as part of the first phase of the Tseung Kwan O New Town. Its first population intake came in 1988 with the opening of Po Lam Estate. Before 2002, there was no railway access to or from Po Lam. The Tseung Kwan O line, including Po Lam station, opened in August 2002.

In addition to the new town area, two villages, Tseung Kwan O Village and Yau Yue Wan Village, are also considered part of Po Lam, although their histories date back to long before the Tseung Kwan O New Town was conceived.

== Demographics ==
Po Lam is designated Tertiary Planning Units 836 in the 2016 Population By-census. It is home to 88,272 people, where major ethnic groups are Chinese (95.2%), Indonesians (2.3%) and Filipino (1.5%). Most households live in subsidised home ownership housing (such as Home Ownership Scheme and Sandwich Class Housing Scheme projects) and private housing.

== Housing ==
=== Public housing ===
- Po Lam Estate (寶林邨). The second character ("林", Lam) is different from the one in the neighbourhood's name
- King Lam Estate

=== Home Ownership Scheme housing ===
- Yan Ming Court
- Ying Ming Court
- Ho Ming Court

=== Others ===
- The Pinnacle (developed by the Hong Kong Housing Society under the Sandwich Class Housing Scheme)
- Radiant Towers (developed by the Hong Kong Housing Society under the Sandwich Class Housing Scheme)
- Verbena Heights (developed by the Hong Kong Housing Society under the Flat-for-Sale Scheme)

=== Private housing ===
- Well On Garden
- Finery Park
- Serenity Place
- Metro City Phases 1 to 3

== Education ==
Schools in Po Lam include:

=== Primary schools ===
- King Lam Catholic Primary School (subsidised)
- Lok Sin Tong Lau Tak Primary School (subsidised)
- Shun Tak Fraternal Association Leung Kit Wah Primary School (subsidised)
- Po Leung Kuk Luk Hing Too Primary School (Direct Subsidy Scheme)
- Sheng Kung Hui Tseung Kwan O Kei Tak Primary School (subsidised)
- Tung Wah Group of Hospitals Wong Yee Jar Jat Memorial Primary School (subsidised)

=== Secondary schools ===
- Carmel Divine Grace Foundation Secondary School (subsidised)
- Ma Kam Ming Charitable Foundation Ma Chan Duen Hey Memorial College (subsidised)
- Shun Tak Fraternal Association Cheng Yu Tung Secondary School (subsidised)
- Tseung Kwan O Government Secondary School (government)
- Tung Wah Group of Hospitals Lui Yun Choy Memorial College (subsidised)
- Yan Chai Hospital Lan Chi Pat Memorial Secondary School (subsidised)
- Wellington Educational Organisation Chang Pui Chung Memorial School (subsidised)
- King Ling College (subsidised)
- Po Leung Kuk Laws Foundation College (Direct Subsidy Scheme)

== Recreation ==
Po Lam hosts a number of public amenities, including the Tseung Kwan O Sports Centre, the Tseung Kwan O Public Swimming Pool and the Tseung Kwan O Public Library, all of which are located close to each other. Also in close proximity to the trio is Po Hong Park, where the annual Lunar New Year Fair takes place. These facilities and the Po Tsui Park, situated next to Po Lam Estate, are all managed by the Leisure and Cultural Services Department.

The neighbourhood is also home to the Metro City Plaza, claimed to be the largest shopping complex in East Kowloon and which, same as the private housing development of which it is a part, comprises three phases: MCP One (formerly Metro City Plaza Phase 1), MCP Central (formerly Metro City Plaza Phase 2) and MCP Discovery (formerly Metro City Plaza Phase 3).

== Transport ==
Po Lam Road North and Po Hong Road are two major roadways in the neighbourhood, with most of the developments sandwiched between them. Po Lam Road North is the extension of Po Lam Road, where the area of Po Lam got its name. Po Lam Road opened in 1956 to connect the Haven of Hope Tuberculosis Sanatorium (now Haven of Hope Hospital) to Tiu Keng Leng and Ma Yau Tong. During the Tseung Kwan O New Town development, Po Lam Road was extended eastward, into the new town, and westward, to Sau Mau Ping. The extension within the new town, which starts from Mau Wu Tsai Village and leads into Po Lam, was named Po Lam Road North. The other extension was still called Po Lam Road. The old section from Tiu Keng Leng to Ma Yau Tong was renamed to Po Lam Road South.

Public transportation in Po Lam is served by the MTRC, Kowloon Motor Bus (KMB) (NWFB) and Citybus. Citybus operates cross-harbour routes to Central (690) and Siu Sai Wan (694). Citybus also operates routes to Hong Kong International Airport Tung Chung, and Shatin. KMB runs routes to Mei Foo, Tsim Sha Tsui East, Mong Kok and Tsuen Wan, among others. The MTRC only runs Tseung Kwan O line, on which Po Lam MTR station is the only rail and subway station in the neighbourhood. In the Railway Development Strategy 2014, the government proposed the East Kowloon line will connect Po Lam station to Diamond Hill station. It is expected to open in 2025.

== Current District Councillors (2020-2023) ==
Code	Constituency	Range	Name	Political affiliation	Notes
Q05	Hang Hau West	Tseung Kwan O Village, Yau Yue Wan Village, Tai Po Tsai, Mau Wu Tsai Village and Ma Yau Tong	Yu Tsun-ning	TKO Shining	(Note: Only Tseung Kwan O Village and Yau Yue Wan Village are part of Po Lam.)
Q16	Hong King	Serenity Place, Hong Sing Garden and King Ming Court	Frankie Lam Siu-chung	Neo Democrats	(Note: Hong Sing Garden and King Ming Court are in the adjacent neighbourhood of Tsui Lam.) (Note: Former Democratic Party member.)
Q18	Po Lam	Po Lam Estate	Fung Kwan-on	Neo Democrats	
Q19	Yan Ying	Metro City Phase 2, Yan Ming Court and Ying Ming Court	Ben Chung Kam-lun	Neo Democrats	
Q20	Wai Yan	Finery Park, Radiant Towers, Verbena Heights and Well On Garden	Chun Hoi-shing	Neo Democrats	
Q21	Wan Hang	Metro City Phases 1 and 3 and The Pinnacle	Gary Fan Kwok-wai	Neo Democrats	
Q22	King Lam	King Lam Estate and Ho Ming Court	Cheung Wai-chiu	TKO Pioneers	
