= Metro City (Hong Kong) =

Housing estate in Tseung Kwan O, Hong Kong

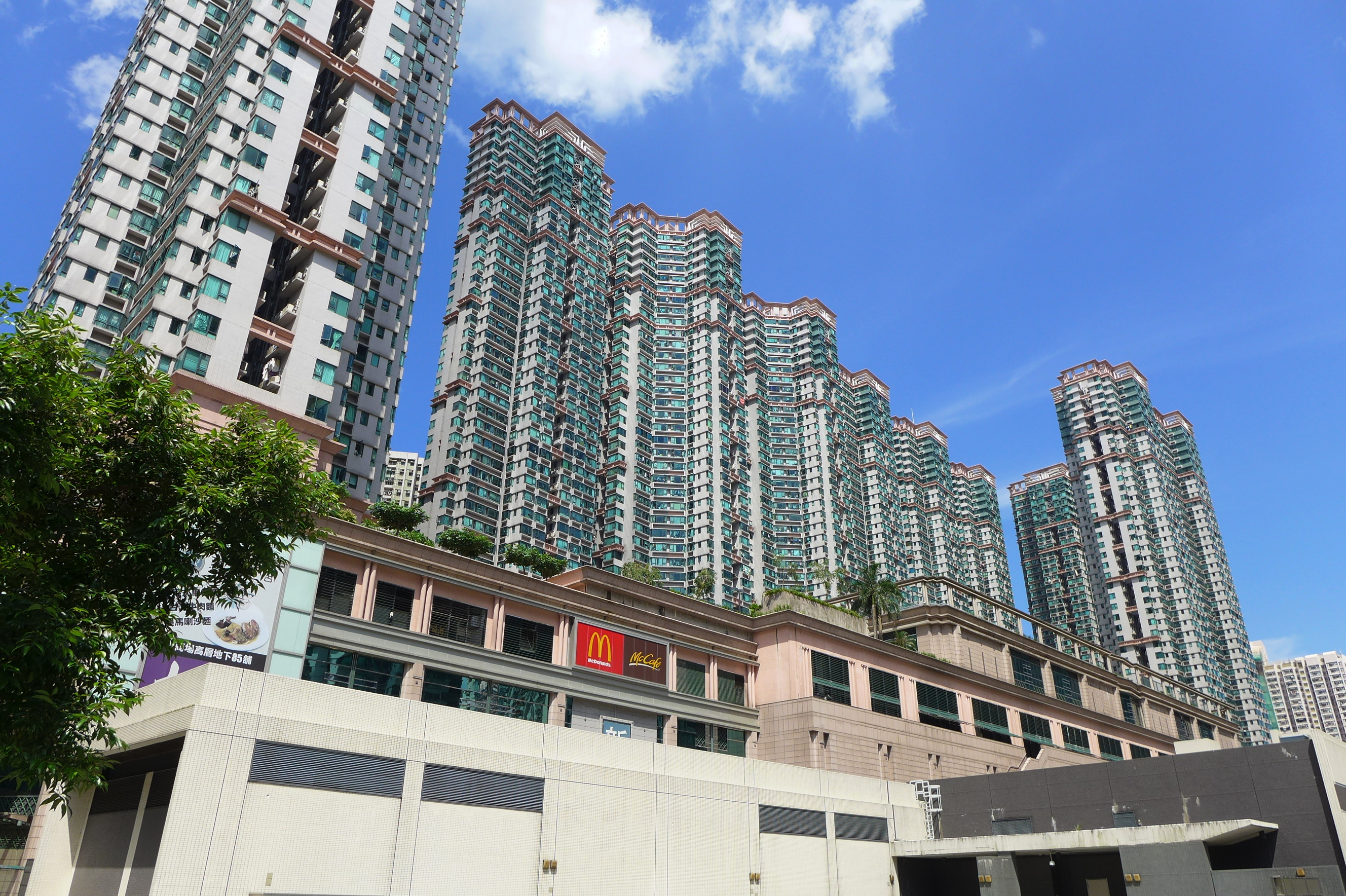
- MCP (Metro City Plaza) Central & Metro City Phase II
- Location: Tseung Kwan O, Sai Kung District, Hong Kong
- Coordinates: 22°19′23″N 114°15′28″E
- Opened: 1996; 30 years ago (Phase 1); 2000; 26 years ago (Phase 2); 2002; 24 years ago (Phase 3)
- Developer: Henderson Land Development (恒基兆業地產)
- Manager: Sunlight REIT (陽光房地產基金):Phase I Henderson Land Development(恒基兆業地產):Phase II/III
- Owner: Sunlight REIT (陽光房地產基金):Phase I Henderson Land Development(恒基兆業地產):Phase II/III
- Num. of stores: 400
- Floor area: 1,500,000 sq ft (140,000 m^{2})

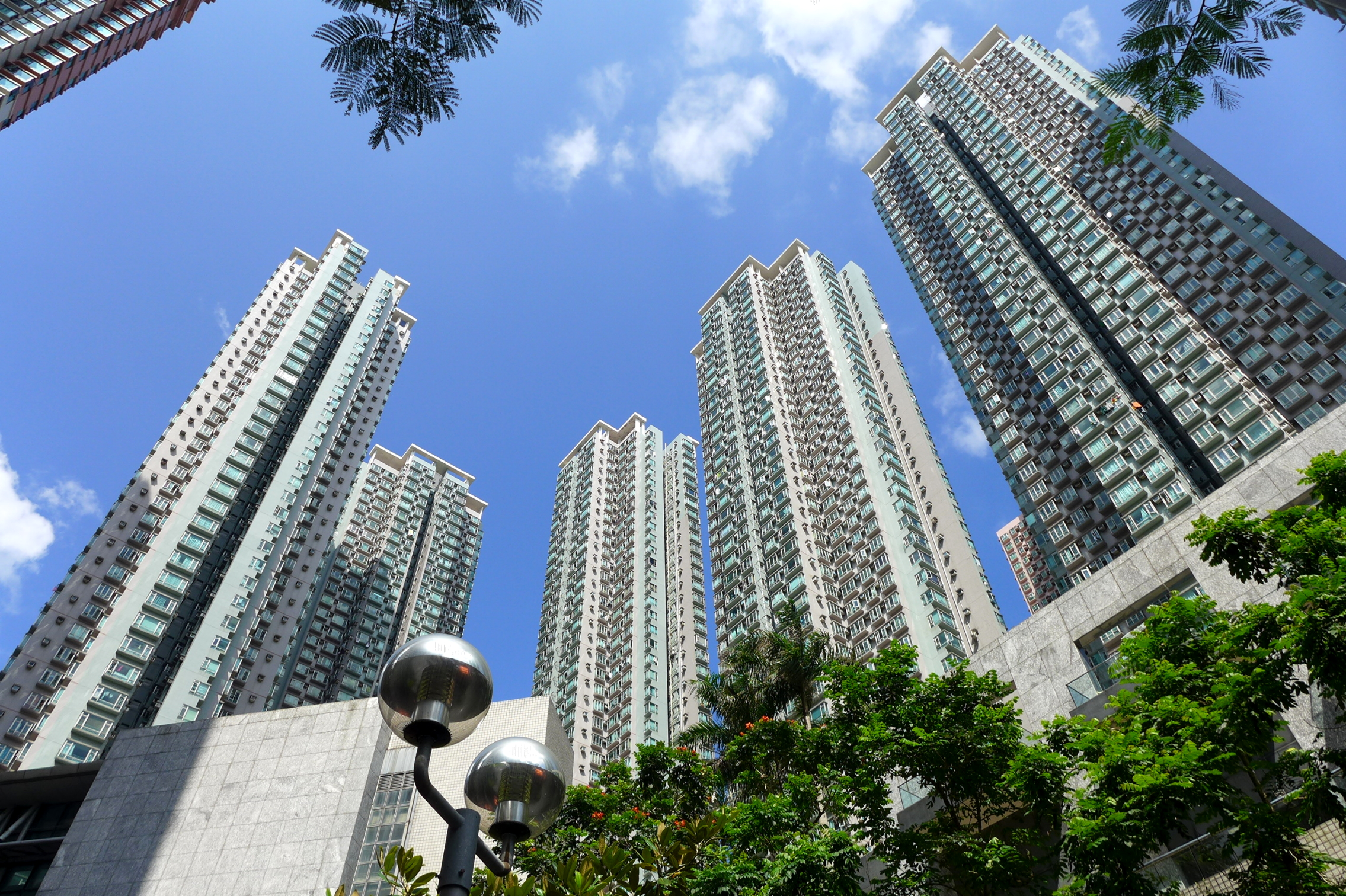
Metro City Phase 1

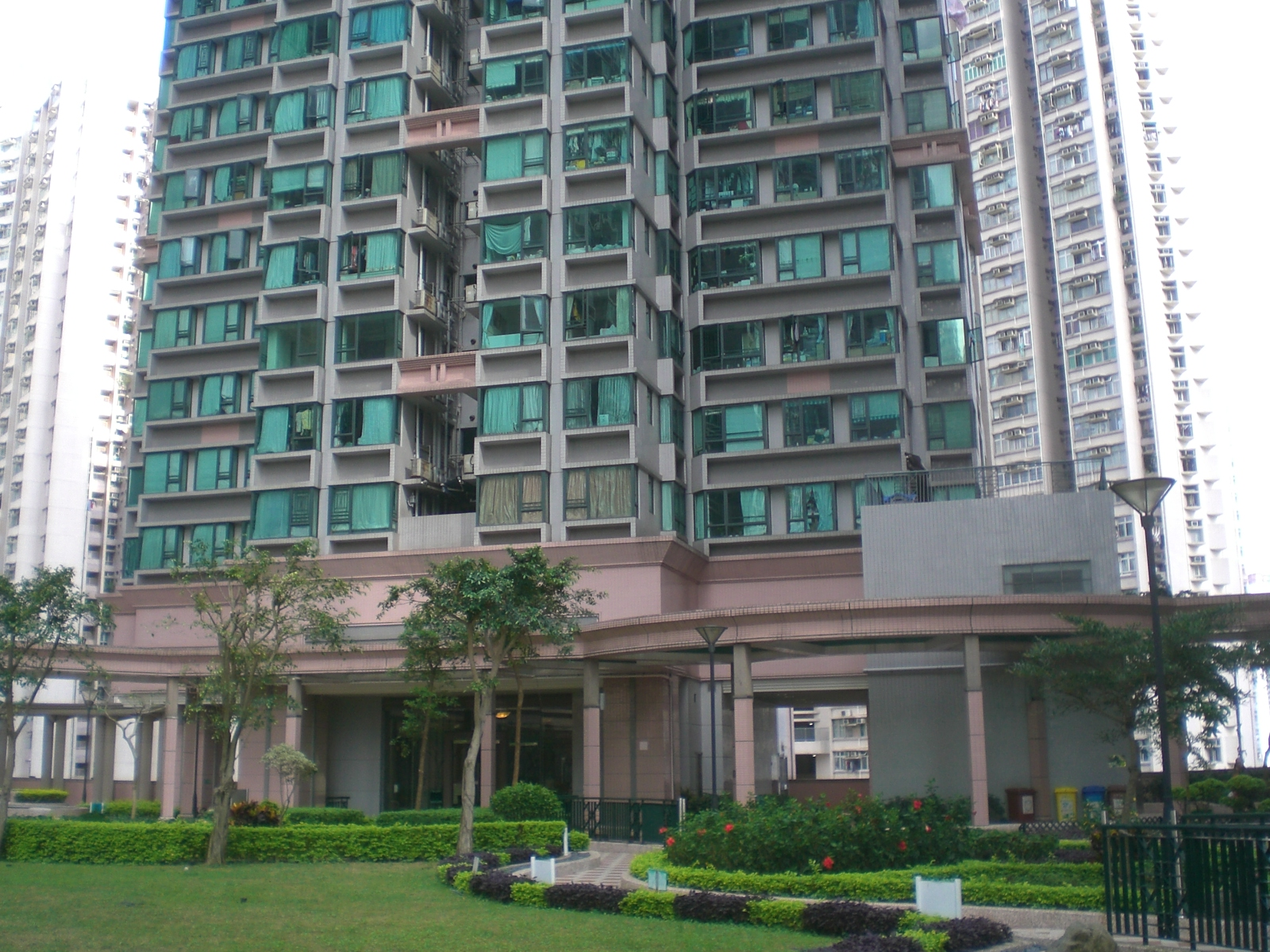
Platform garden of Metro City Phase 2

Metro City (Chinese: 新都城) is the largest private housing estate and shopping centre in Tseung Kwan O, New Territories, Hong Kong, developed by Henderson Land Development. Built on the reclaimed land in Po Lam, the estate was developed in three phases.

The MTR Po Lam station, terminus of Tseung Kwan O line, is located next to Metro City Phase II. Metro City Phase II also serves as the Po Lam public transit terminal.

== Residential blocks ==
The estate is divided into three phases by the order of their development, offering a total of 6768 units. Phase 1 consists of 6 blocks completed in 1996. Phase 2 consists of 11 blocks completed in 2000. Phase 3, also called The Metropolis (Chinese: 都會豪庭), consists of 4 blocks completed in 2002.

== Shopping centre ==
Each phase of Metro City has its own shopping centre. The shopping centre is the largest in Tseung Kwan O and covers 1.5 million square feet in size. It houses a department store, two grocery stores, a wet market, and over 400 shops. There are two cinemas in Tseung Kwan O, one is located at Metro City.

Footbridges connect the three shopping centres. Surrounding housing estates such as The Pinnacle, Verbena Heights, Po Lam Estate, and Yan Ming Court also have direct pedestrian access to Metro City through footbridges.

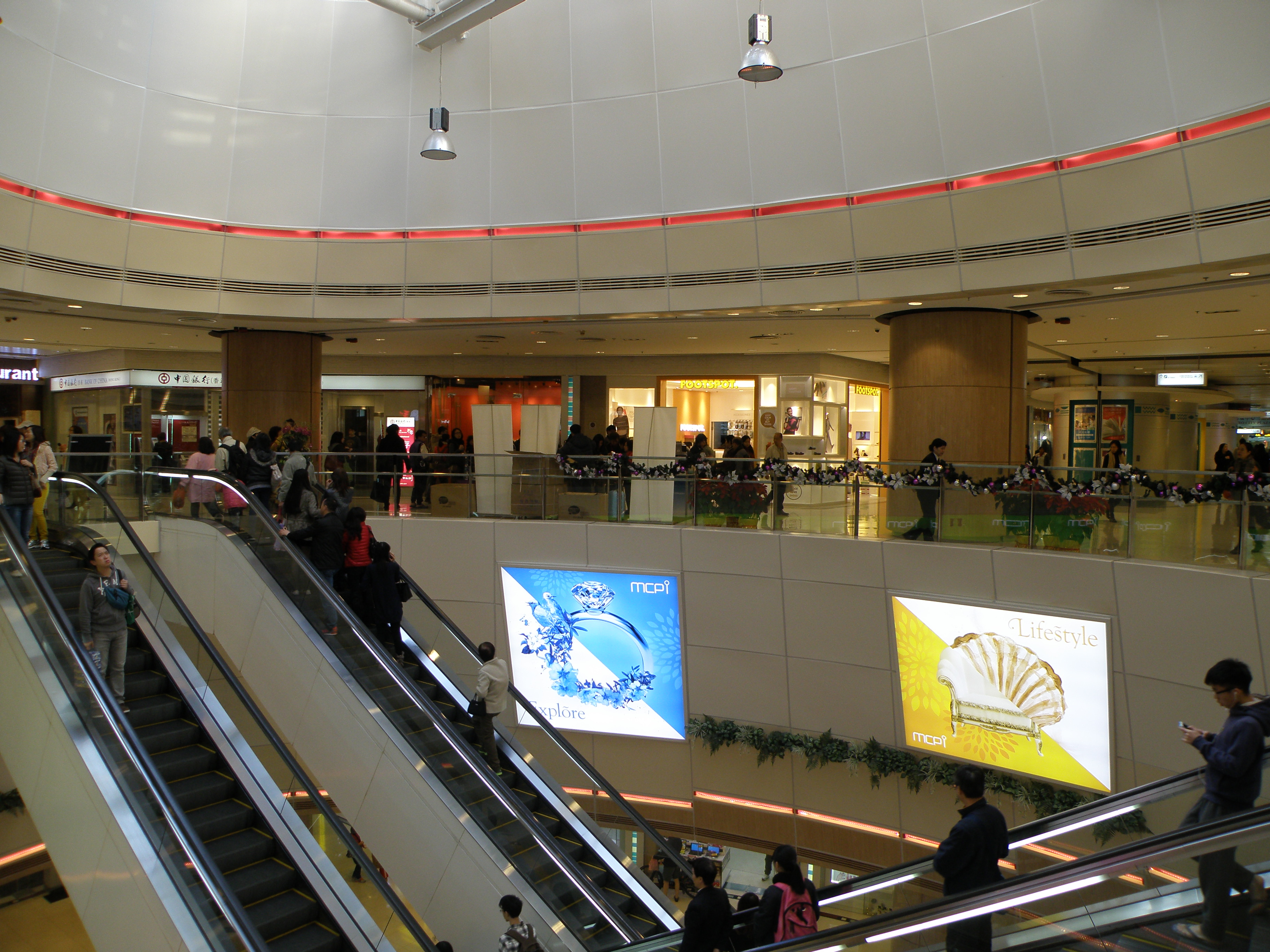
The atrium at MCP One (named Metro City Plaza Phase 1 before renovation) after renovation in 2015

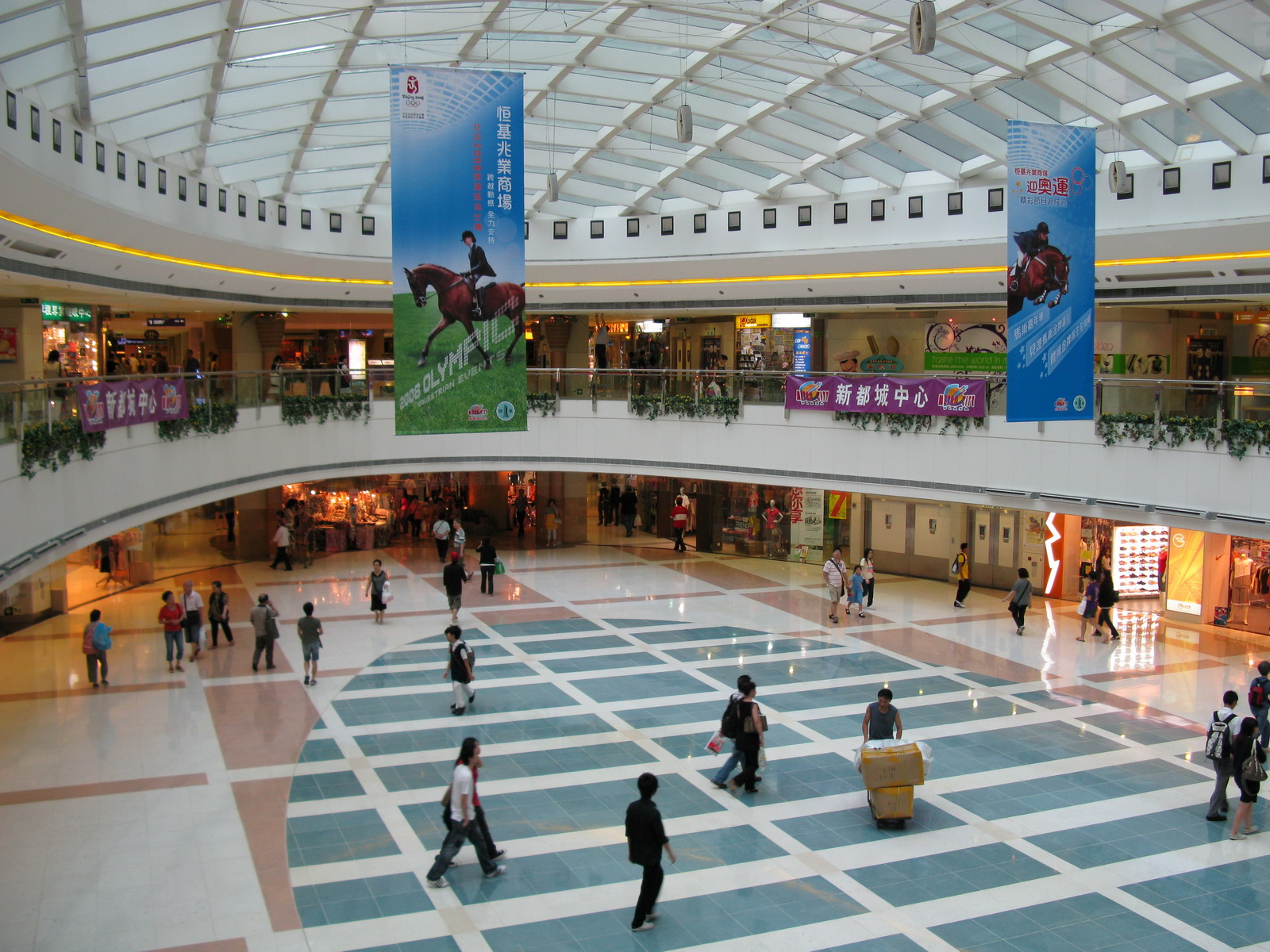
The atrium at MCP Central (named Metro City Plaza Phase 2 before renovation) after renovation in 2014

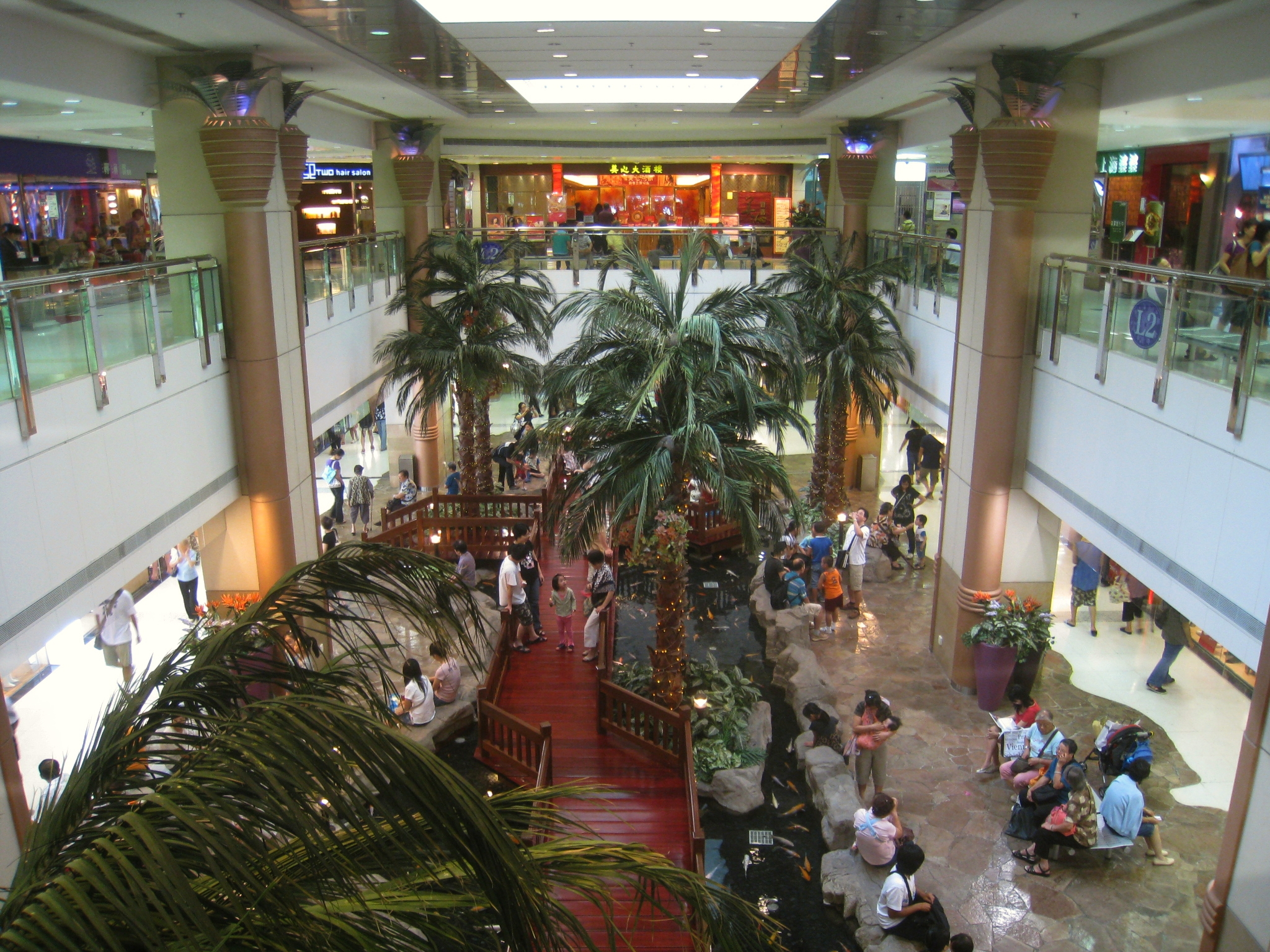
The ponds and water features inside MCP Central, which were removed after the renovation in 2014

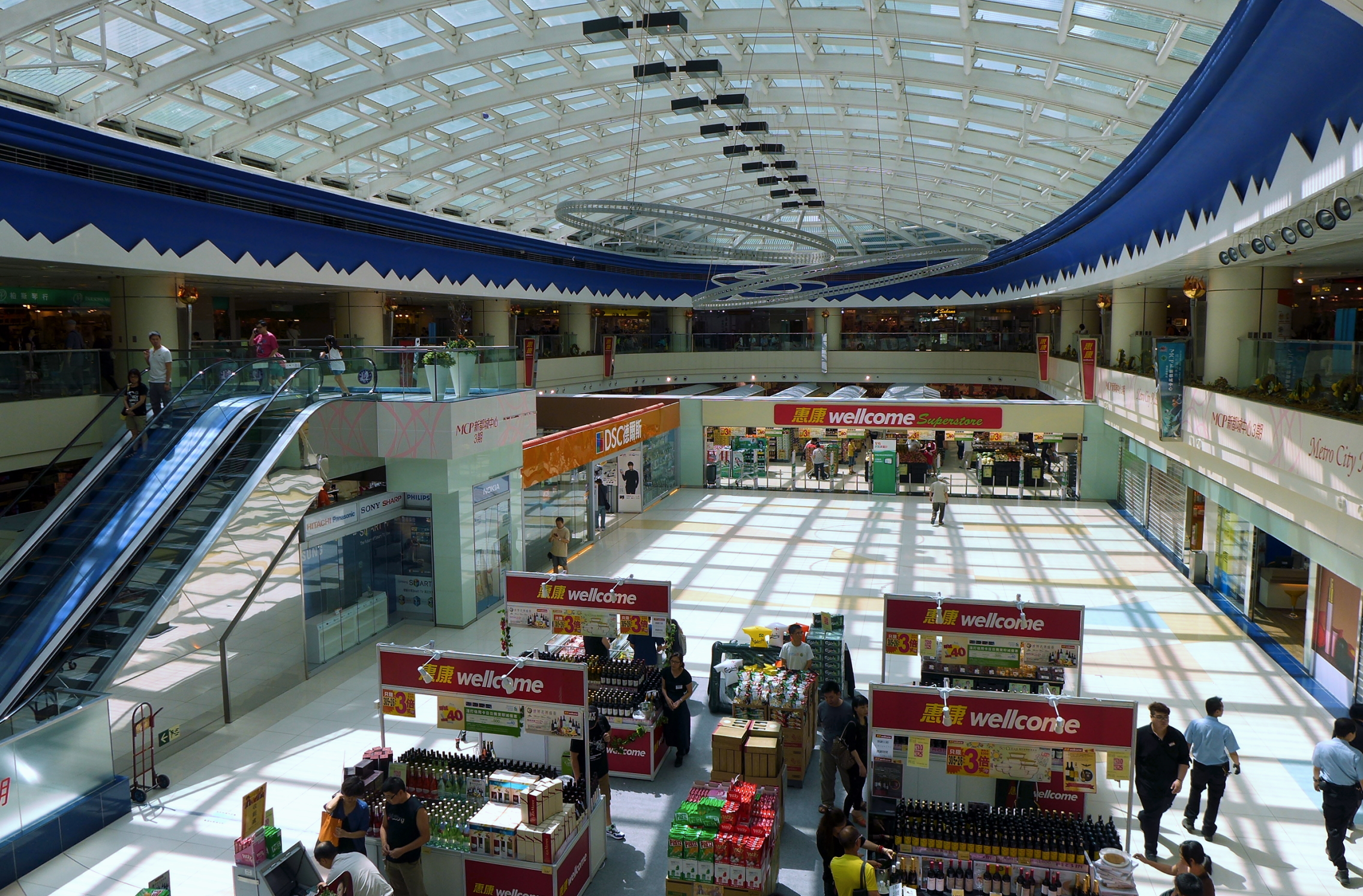
The atrium at MCP Discovery (formerly named Metro City Plaza Phase 3)

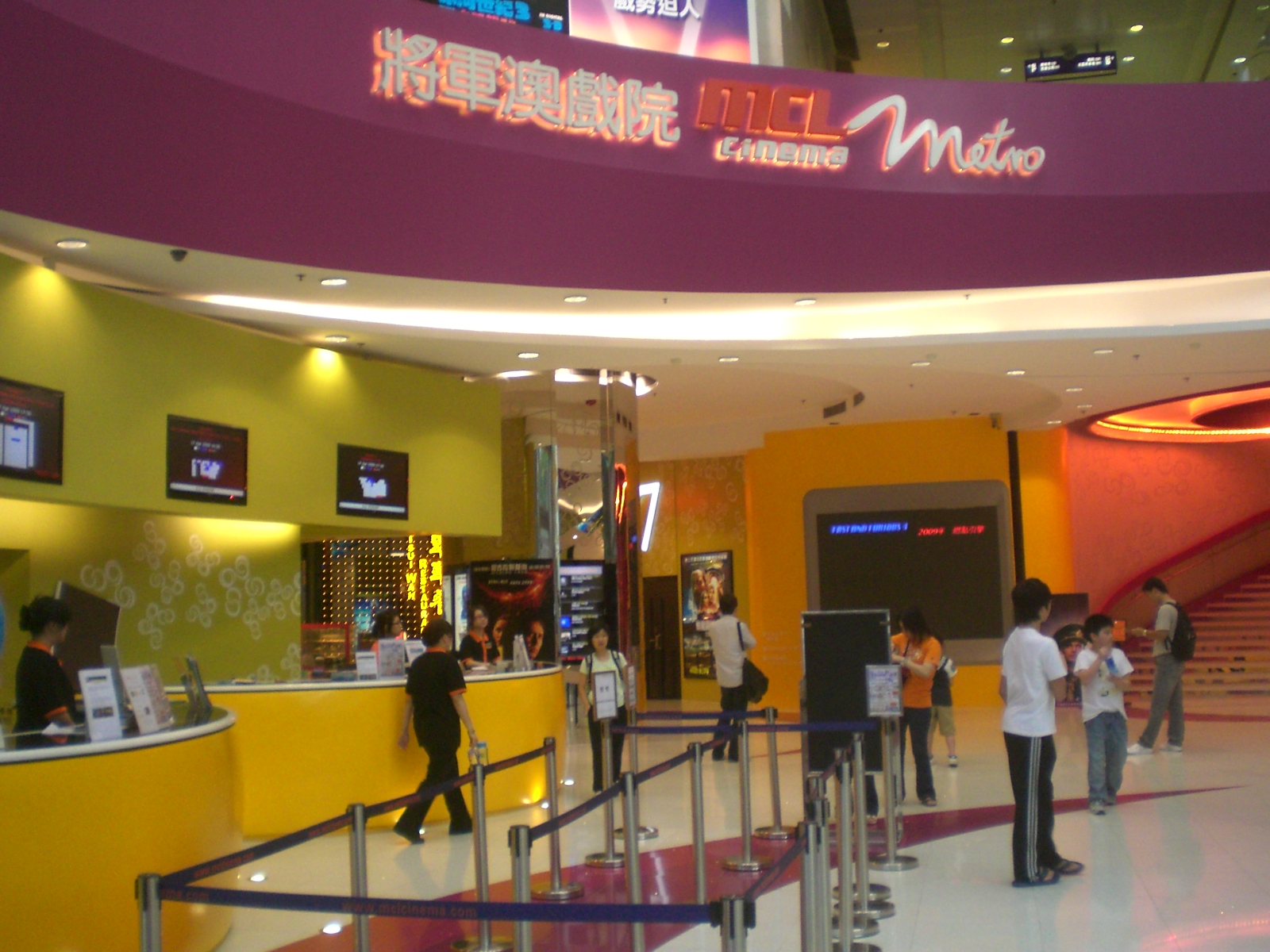
The cinema (named "MCL Cinema Metro City") in MCP Central, which was being renovated in mid-2019
