= Wai Yan (constituency) =

Constituency of the Sai Kung District Council of Hong Kong

- 慧茵
- Elected constituency for the Sai Kung District Council
- Boundary of Wai Yan in Sai Kung District
- District: Sai Kung
- Legislative Council constituency: New Territories South East
- Population: 13,752 (2019)
- Electorate: 8,393 (2019)

Current constituency
- Created: 2019
- Number of members: One
- Member: vacant
- Created from: Hong King, Wan Hang

Wai Yan (Chinese: 慧茵) is one of the 29 constituencies in the Sai Kung District.

Created for the 2019 District Council elections, the constituency returns one district councillor to the Sai Kung District Council, with an election every four years.

Wai Yan loosely covers residential flats in Finery Park, Radiant Towers, Verbena Heights and Well On Garden in Po Lam. It has projected population of 13,752.

== Councillors represented ==
Election	Member	Party
2019	Chun Hoi-shing→Vacant	Neo Democrats→Independent

== Election results ==
=== 2010s ===
Sai Kung District Council Election, 2019: Wai Yan
Party	Candidate	Votes	%	±%
Neo Democrats	Chun Hoi-shing	3,928	61.24	
Nonpartisan	Andrew Ng Ka-chun	2,486	38.76	
Majority		1,442	22.48	
Turnout		6,453	76.90	
Neo Democrats win (new seat)				

慧茵
