= Sandwich Glass (disambiguation) =

Sandwich Glass may refer to:

- Laminated glass, a safety glass formed by "sandwiching" layers of glass with other material
- Glass products of the Boston and Sandwich Glass Company
  - Sandwich Glass Museum
- Gold glass or gold sandwich glass, where a decorative design in gold leaf is fused between two layers of glass

== See also ==
- Sandwich class
