= Po Tsui Park =

Park in Tseung Kwan O, Hong Kong

- 寶翠公園
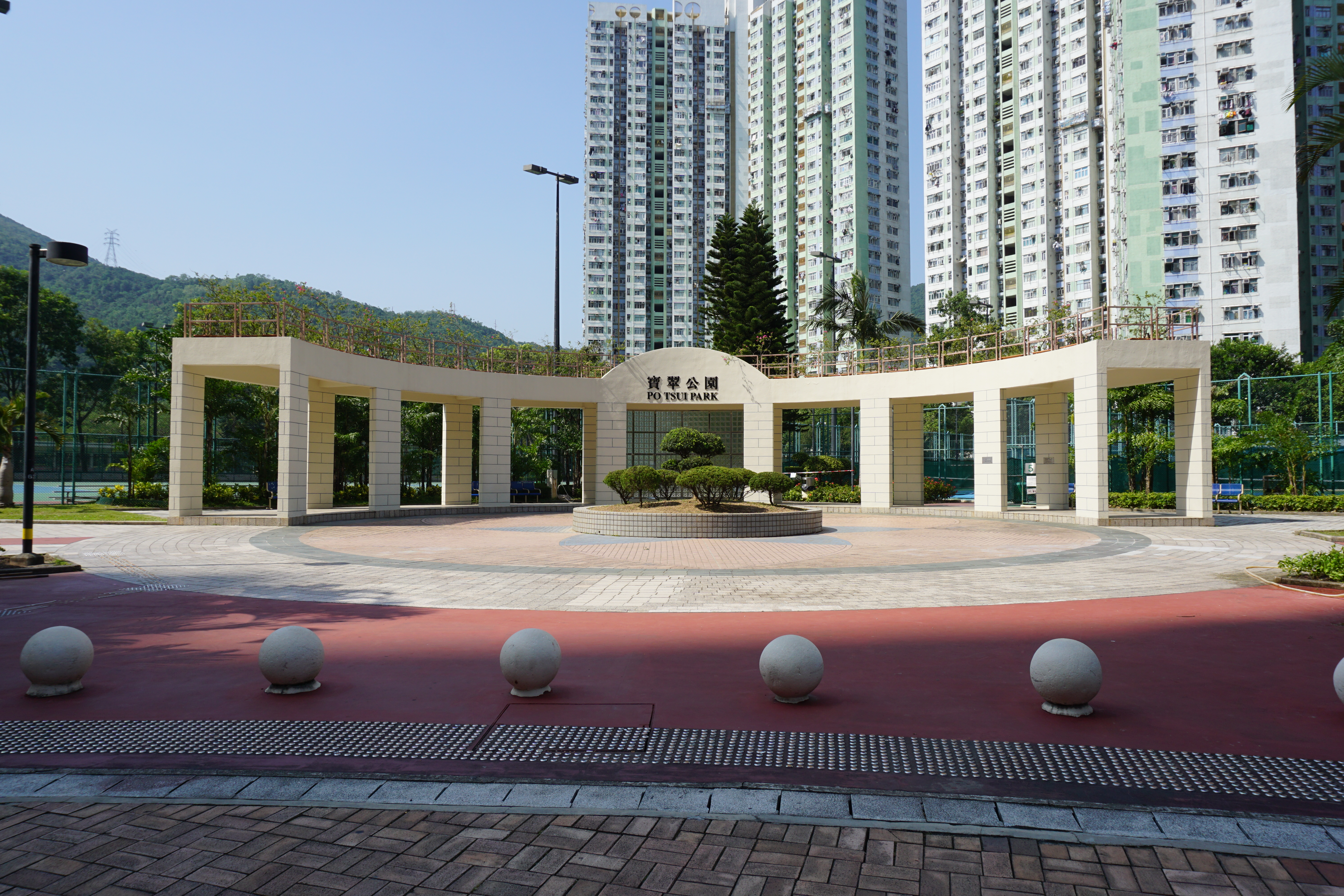
- Entrance gate of Po Tsui Park
- Interactive map of Po Tsui Park
- Location: Po Lam, Hong Kong
- Coordinates: 22°19′29″N 114°15′10″E
- Opened: 25 July 1994; 31 years ago
- Operator: Leisure and Cultural Services Department
- Public transit: Po Lam station

Po Tsui Park (Chinese: 寶翠公園) is a public park between the communities of Po Lam and Tseung Kwan O Village in New Territories, Hong Kong.
