= Radiant Towers =

Housing estate in Tseung Kwan O, Hong Kong

Coordinates: 22.323238°N 114.254578°E

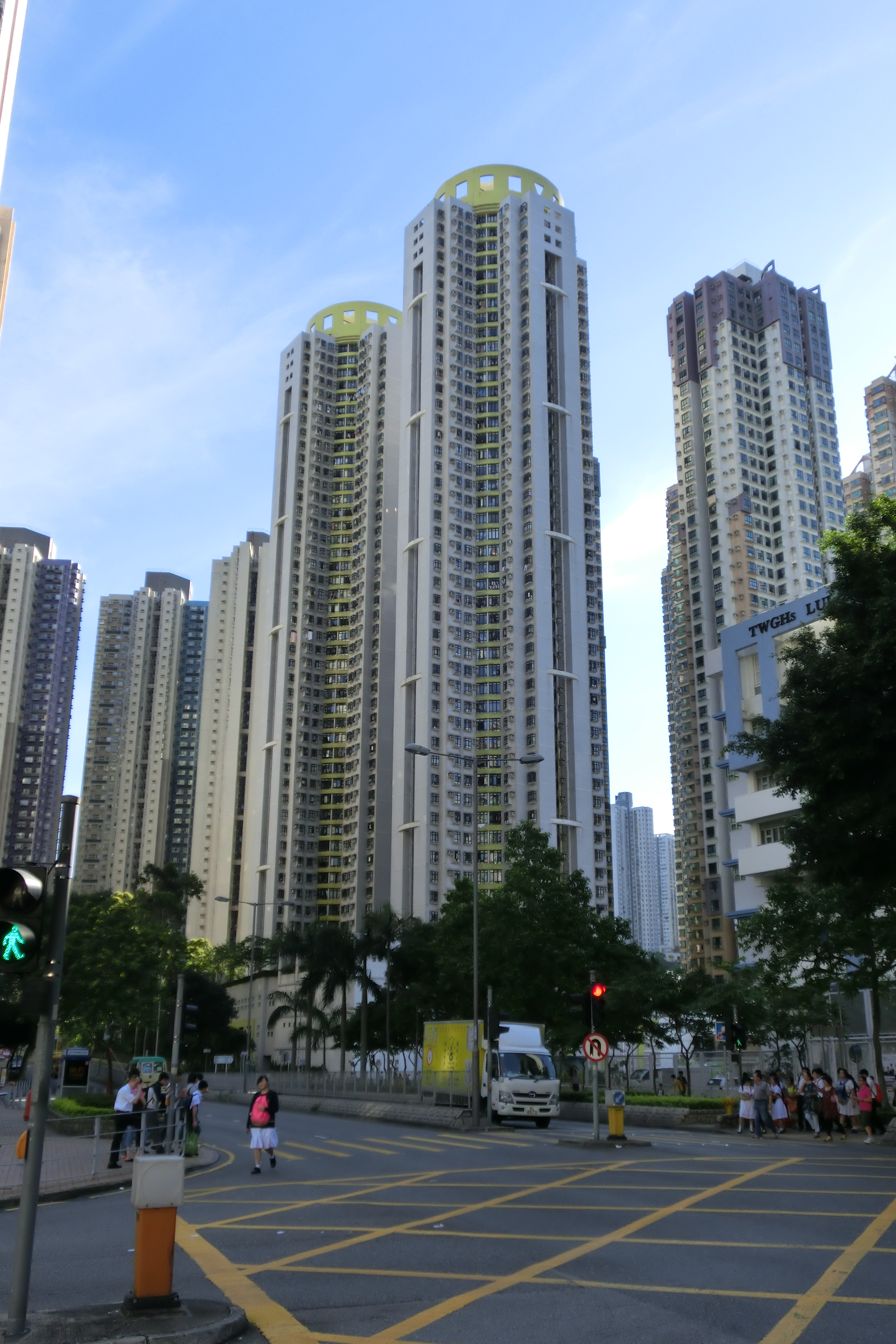
Radiant Towers

Radiant Towers (Chinese: 旭輝臺) is a private housing estate in Po Lam, Tseung Kwan O, New Territories, Hong Kong, developed by Hong Kong Housing Society.

The estate is one of the Society's Sandwich Class Housing Scheme projects converted to private developments. It was sold to the public in early 1997 at a discounted price of HK$2,700 per square foot, compared to the HK$4,000 market value at that time. In 1996, the Hong Kong Housing Society had received 6,520 applications for the purchase of a batch of 1,696 units in Radiant Towers and Marina Habitat.

Radiant Towers was completed in 1999, after the project was delayed because of the bankruptcy of one of the contractors. It comprises two 47-floor residential towers, offering a total of 704 units.

== Politics ==
Radiant Towers is located in Wai Yan constituency of the Sai Kung District Council. It was formerly represented by Chun Hoi-shing, who was elected in the 2019 elections until July 2021.
