= Serenity Place =

Private housing estate in Hong Kong

Coordinates: 22.3224°N 114.2535°E

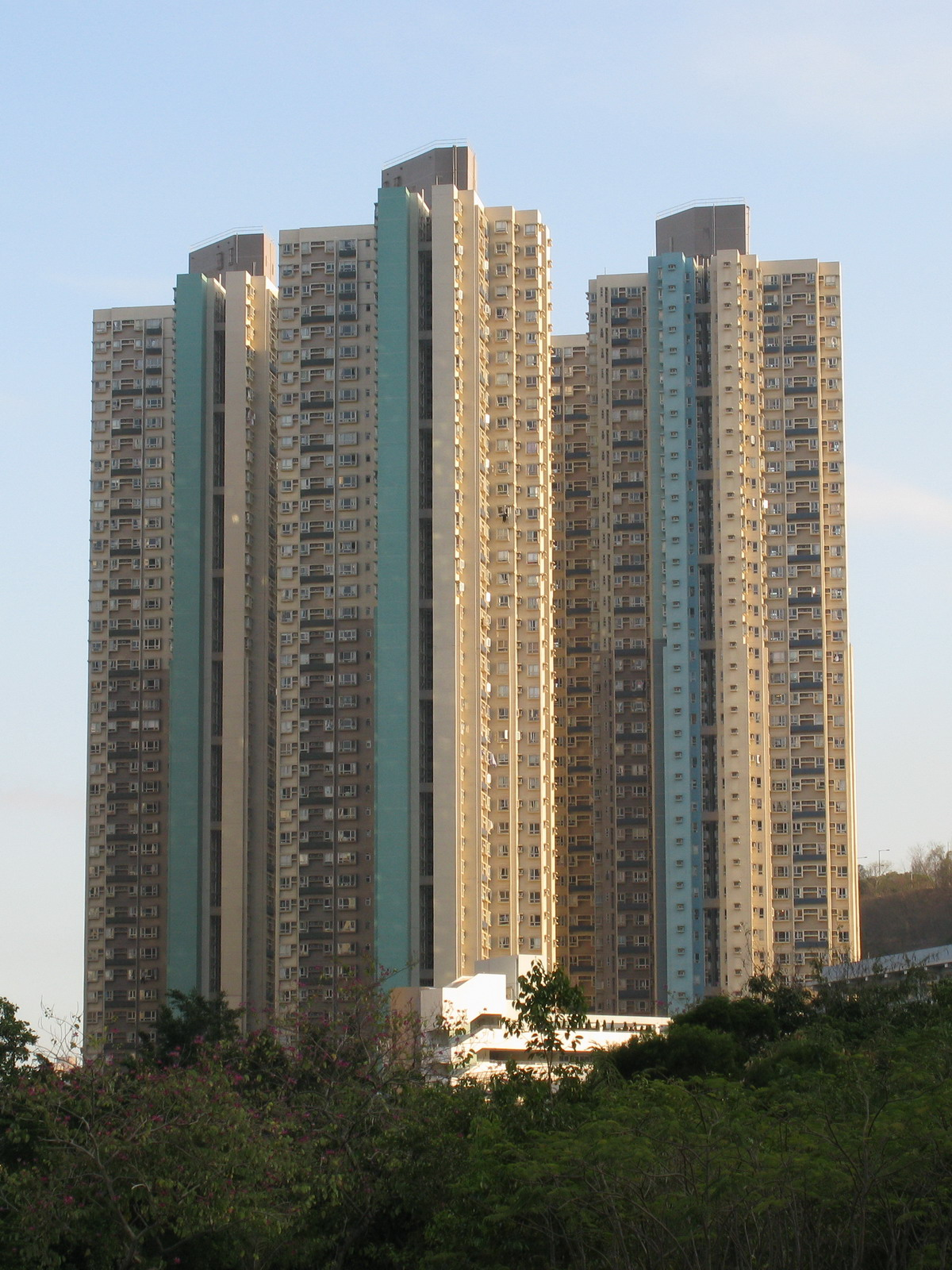
Serenity Place

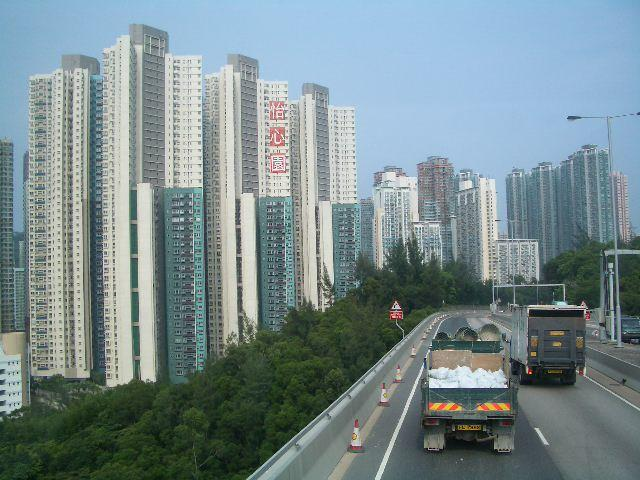
Serenity Place facing Tseung Kwan O Tunnel Road

Serenity Place (Chinese: 怡心園) is a full market value development in 88 Po Hong Road, Tseung Kwan O, New Territories, Hong Kong, developed by Hong Kong Housing Society. It is the Society's last Sandwich Class Housing Scheme project that was converted to private development. It was developed in 2000 and was opened to the public in 2003.

The estate comprises five residential towers, offering a total of 1,526 units. Other facilities include a clubhouse, podium garden, jogging track and playground.

== Demographics ==
According to the 2016 by-census, Serenity Place had a population of 4,589. The median age was 38.3 and the majority of residents (91 per cent) were of Chinese ethnicity. The average household size was 3 people. The median monthly household income of all households (i.e. including both economically active and inactive households) was HK$48,150.

== Politics ==
Serenity Place is located in Hong King constituency of the Sai Kung District Council. It was formerly represented by Frankie Lam Siu-chung, who was elected in the 2019 elections until July 2021.
