= My Home Purchase Plan =

Hong Kong public housing initiative

- Traditional Chinese: 置安心資助房屋計劃
- Simplified Chinese: 置安心资助房屋计划
Transcriptions
Standard Mandarin
- Hanyu Pinyin: Zhì Ānxīn Zīzhù Fángwū Jìhuà
Yue: Cantonese
- Jyutping: zi3 on1 sam1 zi1 zo6 fong4 uk1 gai3 waak6

My Home Purchase Plan is one of the public housing initiatives of Hong Kong. This plan enables eligible citizens to purchase homes by way of "rent-and-buy". The Plan aims to provide assistance to potential sandwich class home buyers who are able to repay mortgages in the long term but currently do not have enough savings for the down payment. This plan is introduced by the Chief Executive of Hong Kong in the Policy address of Hong Kong 2010. The implementation of plan, that is the first 5000 flats under the plan is expected to be ready for sell in 2014.

Under this Plan, the Hong Kong Housing Society will lease the flats to eligible applicants at prevailing market rates. The tenancy period will be up to five years, within which the rent will stay put. After an occupation period of two years, tenants may purchase the flat they rent or another flat under the Plan at prevailing market price, or a flat on the private market. They will receive a subsidy equivalent to half of the net rental they have paid during the tenancy period, and use it for part of the down payment. Upon maturity of the five-year period, tenants will have to move out but still consider purchasing a flat within a period of two years.

My Home Purchase Plan has reserved five sites (i.e. Tsing Yi, Diamond Hill, Sha Tin, Tai Po, Tuen Mun in building 5000 subsidized housing.) Housings under this plan, is only exclusively for family applicants that have a household income of less than $39,000 a month and assets of no more than $600,000. The major target of the Plan are the "White Form" applicants while "Green Form" and singleton applicants will also be allocated certain quota. The first pilot project of My Home Purchase Plan is at Tsing Luk Street in Tsing Yi, and is estimated to have provide 1000 flats.

== Background ==
The private residential property prices has increased by 19% from September 2009 to September 2010, this phenomenon is attributable to the progressive economic recovery, low interest rate environment and the relatively tight supply of private residential flats in the past few years. The mortgage-to-income ratio in the second quarter was 41%, though it was lower than the average ratio of 53% over the past 20 years. This figure reveals the concern of the public on the recent increase on property prices. As the price of housing property in Hong Kong is skyrocketing, the amount of available mass market flats at affordable prices and overall supply of land for flat production in the long term is worrying. The Transport and Housing Bureau (THB) conducted a series of public consultations. Opinions on whether to subsidize home ownership were collected from May to 17 September 2010. Stakeholders and members of the public engage through different channels to look at matters related to the subject, in order to identify a way that can reassure concerns of the public. The outcome of the public consultation showed that a lot of people are concerned about the rise in property prices and the difficulties in purchasing their first flat. The Hong Kong Government recognizes the importance of home ownership to the public. It is the common will of the people to secure a stable home and to improve their quality of life. The Legislative Council of Hong Kong is of the view that the Government should introduce measures to help the sandwich class purchase their own flats, regarding the high property price. It is asserted that providing relief measures to sandwich class home buyers to give them time to save up is suitable. As a result, the Government, in collaboration with the Hong Kong Housing Society (HKHS), will introduce My Home Purchase Plan.

== The Government's Housing Policy Objectives ==
The Government's housing policy objectives are as follows –

=== (A) To provide subsidised rental housing for families in need ===
The government's housing policy remains as "delivering the overarching objective of providing subsidised rental housing for families in need must continue to sit at the very heart of the government’s housing strategy." This was announced in the "Statement on Housing Policy" by the then Secretary for Housing, Planning and Lands in November 2002. Hence, the government's commitment to the provision of public rental housing (PRH) has not been changed.

=== (B) To uphold minimal market intervention ===
Taking into account the government's policy of minimal market intervention, other than PRH, the Government will continue to withdraw as far as possible from housing assistance programmes. Under the minimal intervention approach, the government is firmly committed to provide a fair and stable operating environment for the sake of the healthy development of the private property market. Moreover, efforts are made to enhance the transparency of sales information and fairness of transactions of first-hand private residential properties in order to protect consumers' rights;

=== (C) To maintain the steady development of property market ===
It must be stressed that the Government place utmost importance in the home ownership needs of the Hong Kong citizens. This can be achieved by the government continuing to ensure a steady supply of land so that the residential property market can develop in a steady and healthy manner with low pressure of rising price.

=== (D) To nurture the "can-do" spirit of Hong Kong people ===
It is recognized that home ownership is a matter of personal choice which is greatly related to individual circumstances and affordability. The Government is wary that any type of assistance provided should not erode the key to Hong Kong's success and the core of Hong Kong's values, the "can-do" spirit of Hong Kong people. Thus, the Government will facilitate the provision of different housing options for different sectors of the community, rather than going back to the property market. Relevant policies includes working with the HKHS to implement a new form of assisted home ownership premised on the concept of "rent-and-buy". The new scheme of "My Home Purchase Plan", together with measures introduced to improve the transparency and fairness of first-hand sales in the private sector, and the revitalisation measures for the Home Ownership Scheme (HOS) Secondary Market Scheme (SMS), will increase choice to meet the different housing needs of the community in a sustainable manner.

== Content ==
In this plan, Hong Kong government is going to give land to the Hong Kong Housing Society so as to construe flats of small and medium size for lease to qualified applicants at the current market rent. Without raising the rent within the period, the tenants can live in the flat at most for five years. During the period in which two years are passed after the first admission of the tenants, they have two choices: to purchase the flat they are living or alternatively another flat provided by My Home Purchase Plan at current market price, or else flats of private housing estate. Purchase Subsidy which is equal to half of the net rent will be provided. On the contrary, Purchase Subsidy will not be provided for the tenants who have not bought any flat under My Home Purchase Plan or in the private housing market within certain period of time.

== Merits ==
=== (A) Flexibility ===
(i) Sandwich class people without enough savings for down payment can rent a flat, and then buy their own house later under MHPP. (ii) Rental flats for a maximum five years will be provided so they can have enough time to ponder over their plan of buying houses and do not have to make careless decisions on purchase of flat. Therefore, they will bear lower risks.

=== (B) Helps accumulate savings ===
As the rent will remain unchanged within the rental period, the tenants can take time to save up their money for down payment, which is the most difficult to be saved up.

=== (C) Greater upward mobility in the property market ===
The majority of the quota will be allocated to White Form applicants, and the remaining quota will be allocated to PRH tenants. It will help the PRH turnover.

=== (D) Complements market inadequacy ===
(i) HKHS is a non-profit-making, which provides flats with high efficiency. (ii) MHPP flats help fill the shortage of "no-frills" in the primary private market.

== Eligibility Criteria ==
GF applicants and WF applicants are eligible to apply for MHPP if they meet the eligibility criteria.

There will not be any restrictions on income and asset of the tenants of PRH estates and GF applicants, but if their application under MHPP succeeds, after they have moved into the flats under MHPP, they will be ordered to give the PRH units to the Housing Authority or HKHS.

However, WF applicants would have to meet the laid-down asset and income limits. Preliminary proposal on the income and asset limits is –
(a) Household applicants' upper income limit is about $39,000 per month, and the upper asset limit is about $600,000; and
(b) Singleton applicants' upper income limit is about $23,000 per month, and the upper asset limit is about $300,000.

In the future, HKHS will investigate and with regard the then market situation, set the income and asset limits, before it accepts applications for pre-letting of the Tsing Luk Street project.

First-time homebuyers are the targets of the scheme. Meanwhile, there will be strict criteria. It is proposed that applicants and other family members on the application forms should not have owned any residential properties for a period of ten years before the closing of the pre-letting application period. People who previously joined any form of Government subsidized home purchase schemes (e.g. HOS/Private Sector Participation Scheme, Tenants Purchase Scheme, Sandwich Class Housing Scheme, and the various home purchase loan schemes) are not eligible for MHPP.

== No double benefit requirement ==
Tenants who have bought a property under MHPP will not qualify for any other form of subsidy in the future housing schemes provided by the Government. However, if MHPP beneficiaries have great financial difficulties in future and are in real need of PRH, the Government may give discretion to exceptional cases.

== Priority of different categories of applicants ==
Applicants include 1) family applicants, 2) GF family applicants and 3) singleton applicants. The priority may be set by 1) ballot, 2) quota or 3) point system. Ballot is fair. But the remaining means are complicated in terms of administration. On balance of efficiency and fairness, a means premising on a quota system, and complemented with balloting will be considered. It is because such a set of criteria will be fairer, more focused and transparent.
