= Sandwich Class Housing Scheme =

- Traditional Chinese: 夾心階層住屋計劃
- Simplified Chinese: 夹心阶层住屋计划
- Cantonese Yale: Gaap sām gāai chàhng jyuh ūk gai waahk
Transcriptions
Standard Mandarin
- Hanyu Pinyin: Jiāxīn Jiēcéng Zhù Wū Jìhuà
Yue: Cantonese
- Yale Romanization: Gaap sām gāai chàhng jyuh ūk gai waahk
- Jyutping: Gaap3 sam1 gaai1 cang4 zyu6 nguk1 gai3 waak6

The Sandwich Class Housing Scheme was a scheme from the Hong Kong Housing Society offering apartments to middle-income families, i.e. sandwich class, at concessionary prices during the 1990s in Hong Kong. The purchases were subject to a five-year resale restriction. The first development, Tivoli Garden, was completed in 1995, and was followed by 12 other developments. In total, more than 12,000 units were offered.

Unlike Home Ownership Scheme and Flat-for-Sale Scheme, the owners under Sandwich Class Housing Scheme must pay a land premium before they can sell their flats in the free second-hand property market.

== Developments ==
The housing estates built under the scheme were: (number of apartments and year of completion into brackets)

- Park Belvedere (雅景臺), Ma On Shan (882 - 1998)
- Sunshine Grove (晴碧花園), Sha Tin (508 - 1998)
- The Pinnacle (叠翠軒), Tseung Kwan O (1,424 - 1999)
- Tivoli Garden (宏福花園), Tsing Yi (1,024 - 1995)
- Hibiscus Park (芊紅居), Kwai Chung (420 - 1998)
- Marina Habitat (悅海華庭), Ap Lei Chau (992 - 1998)
- Bel Air Heights (悅庭軒), Diamond Hill (798 - 1999)
- Cascades (欣圖軒), Ho Man Tin (712 - 1999)
- Highland Park (浩景臺), Kwai Chung (1,456 - 1999)

Three developments were converted into private properties for sale at full market values:

- Cayman Rise, Kennedy Town
- Radiant Towers (旭輝臺) Tseung Kwan O (704 - 1999)
- Mountain Shore, Ma On Shan (2002)
- Serenity Place, Tseung Kwan O (2003)

Land reallocated to Housing Authority:

- Proposed SCHC and Flat-for-Sale Scheme development in Area 103 of Tin Shui Wai (now Tin Ching Estate)

== Sales ==
Demand for Sandwich Class Housing apartments was generally high. For example, in 1996, the Hong Kong Housing Society received 6,520 applications for the sale of a batch of 1,696 units in Radiant Towers and Marina Habitat. This level of applications was a 40% increase in comparison to those for Park Belvedere and Tivoli Gardens, in 1995 and 1994 respectively.

In the case of several projects, following a Government policy to suspend the sale of the subsidized flats in September 2001, not all units were sold under the initial Sandwich Class Housing Scheme. These projects include: Marina Habitat, The Pinnacle, Highland Park and Cascades.

All units of Mountain Shore were initially sold within 9 hours in April 2002 at an average price of HK$2,900 per sq. ft.

== See also ==
- My Home Purchase Plan
