= Po Lam (constituency) =

Constituency of the Sai Kung District Council of Hong Kong

- Elected constituency for the Sai Kung District Council
- Boundary of Po Lam in Sai Kung District
- District: Sai Kung
- Legislative Council constituency: New Territories South East
- Population: 15,416 (2019)
- Electorate: 11,657 (2019)

Current constituency
- Created: 1991
- Number of members: One
- Member: vacant

Po Lam (Chinese: 寶林) is one of the 29 constituencies in the Sai Kung District.

The constituency returns one district councillor to the Sai Kung District Council, with an election every four years.

Po Lam constituency is loosely based on Po Lam Estate in Po Lam with estimated population of 15,416.

== Councillors represented ==
Election	Member	Party
1991	Alfred Au Ning-fat	ADPL
????	Alfred Au Ning-fat	Civil Force
2014	Alfred Au Ning-fat	NPP/CF
2019	Fung Kwan-on →Vacant	Neo Democrats→Independent

== Election results ==
=== 2010s ===
Sai Kung District Council Election, 2019: Po Lam
Party	Candidate	Votes	%	±%
Neo Democrats	Fung Kwan-on	4,599	57.60	
NPP (Civil Force)	Tam Chuk-kwan	3,385	42.40	
Majority		1,214	15.20	
Turnout		8,019	68.83	
Neo Democrats gain from NPP		Swing		
