= Tseung Kwan O Village =

Village in New Territories, Hong Kong

Coordinates: 22.326908°N 114.250087°E

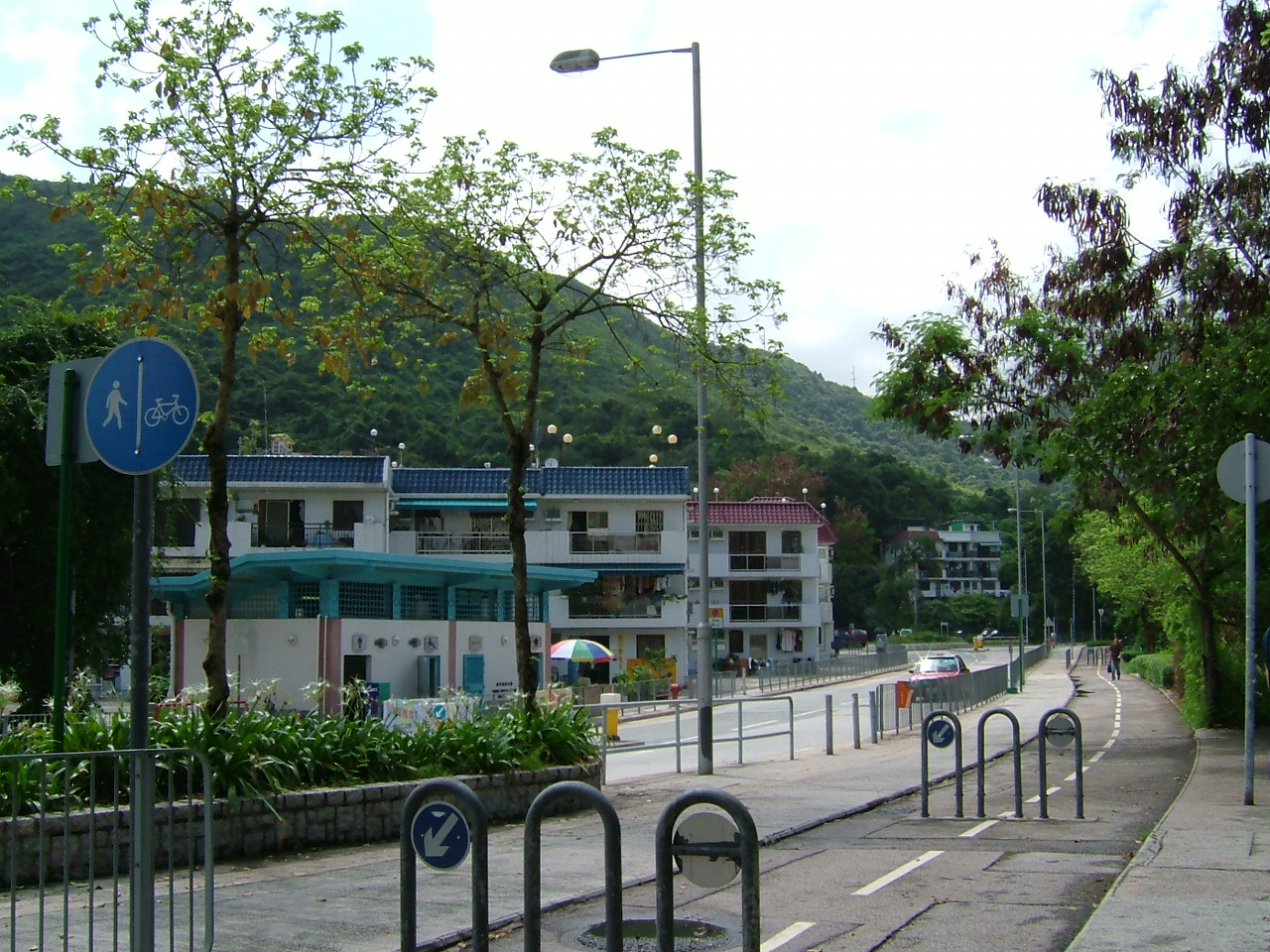
Tseung Kwan O Village.

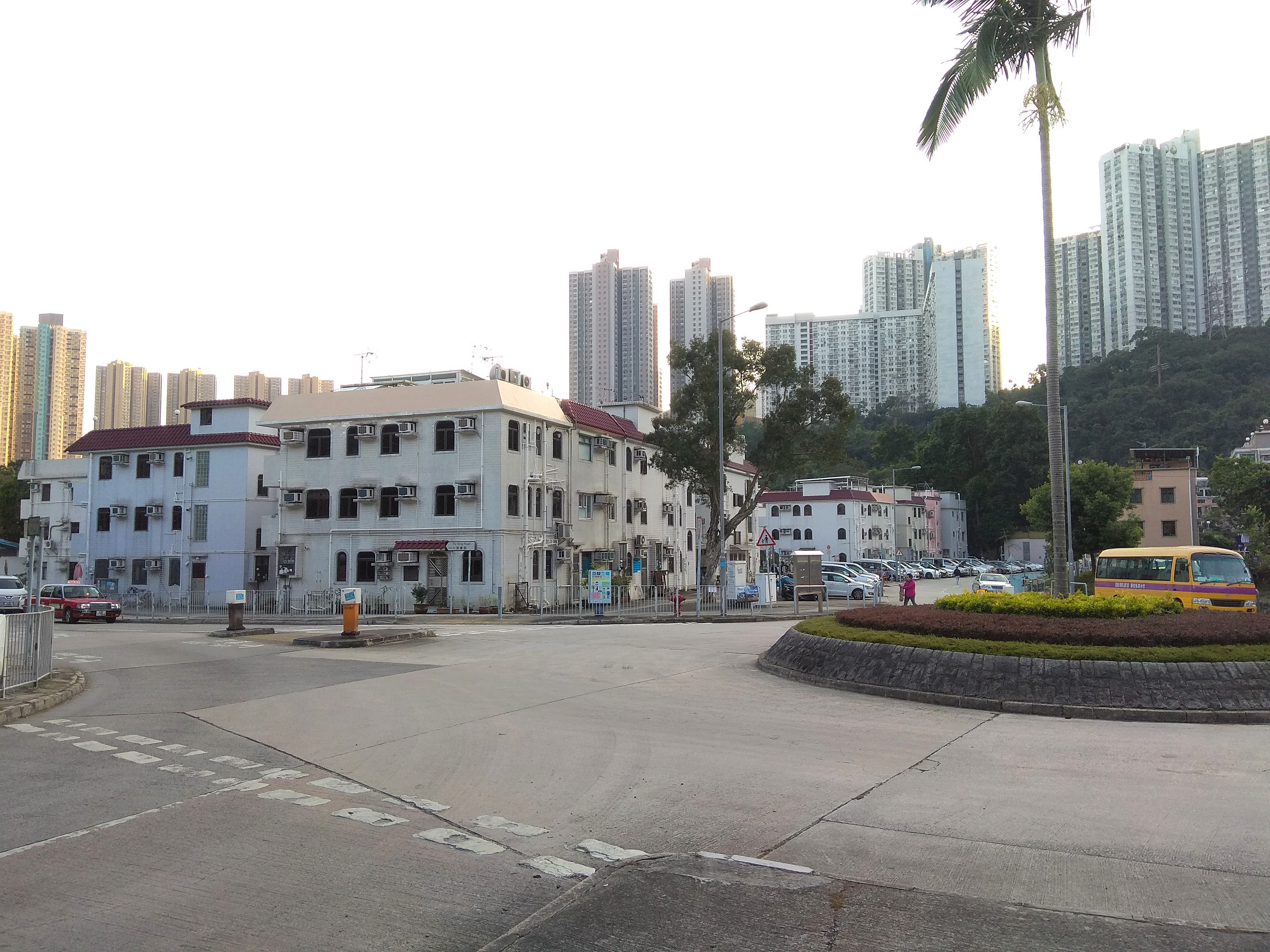
Tseung Kwan O Village.

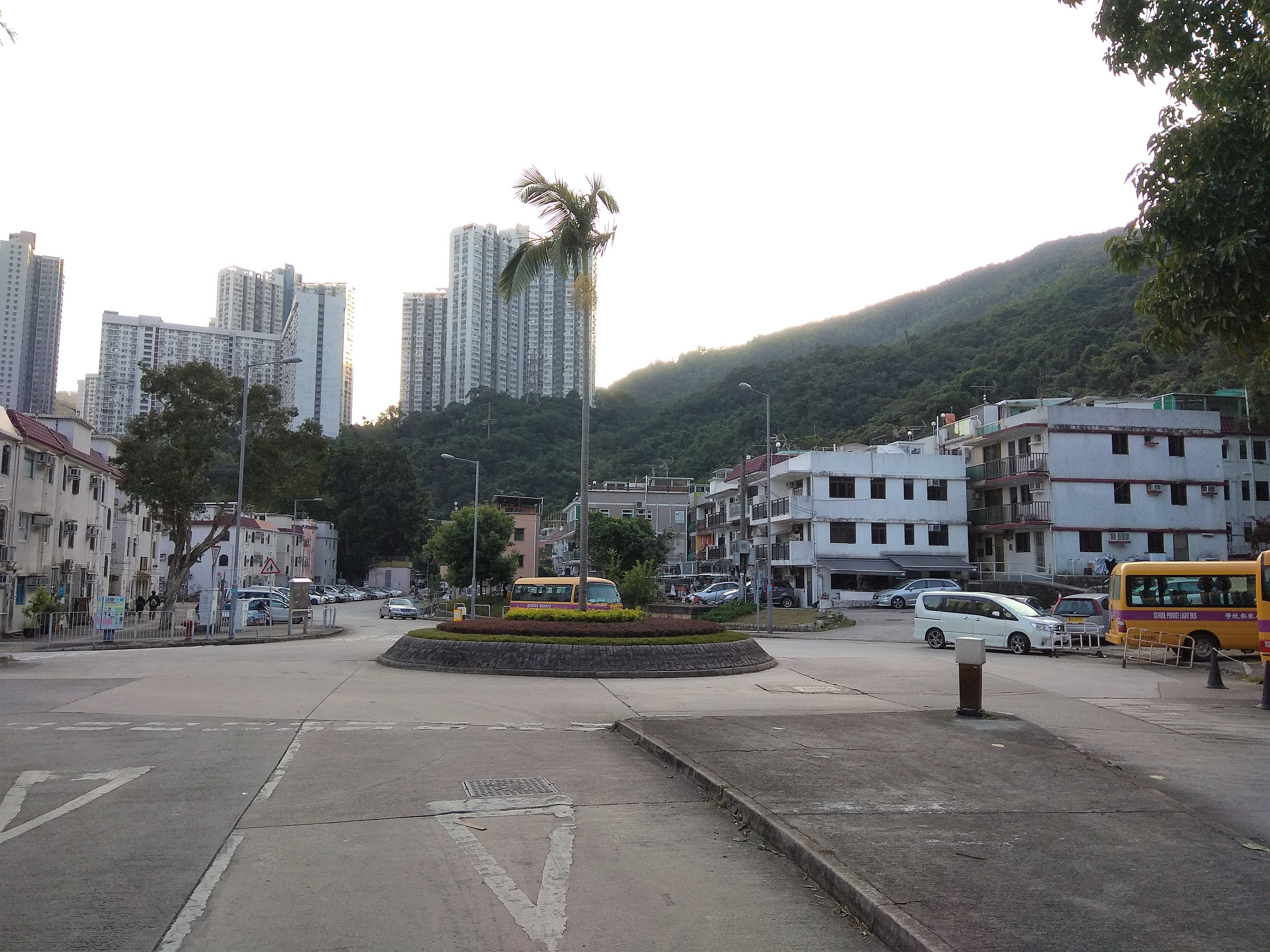
Tseung Kwan O Village.

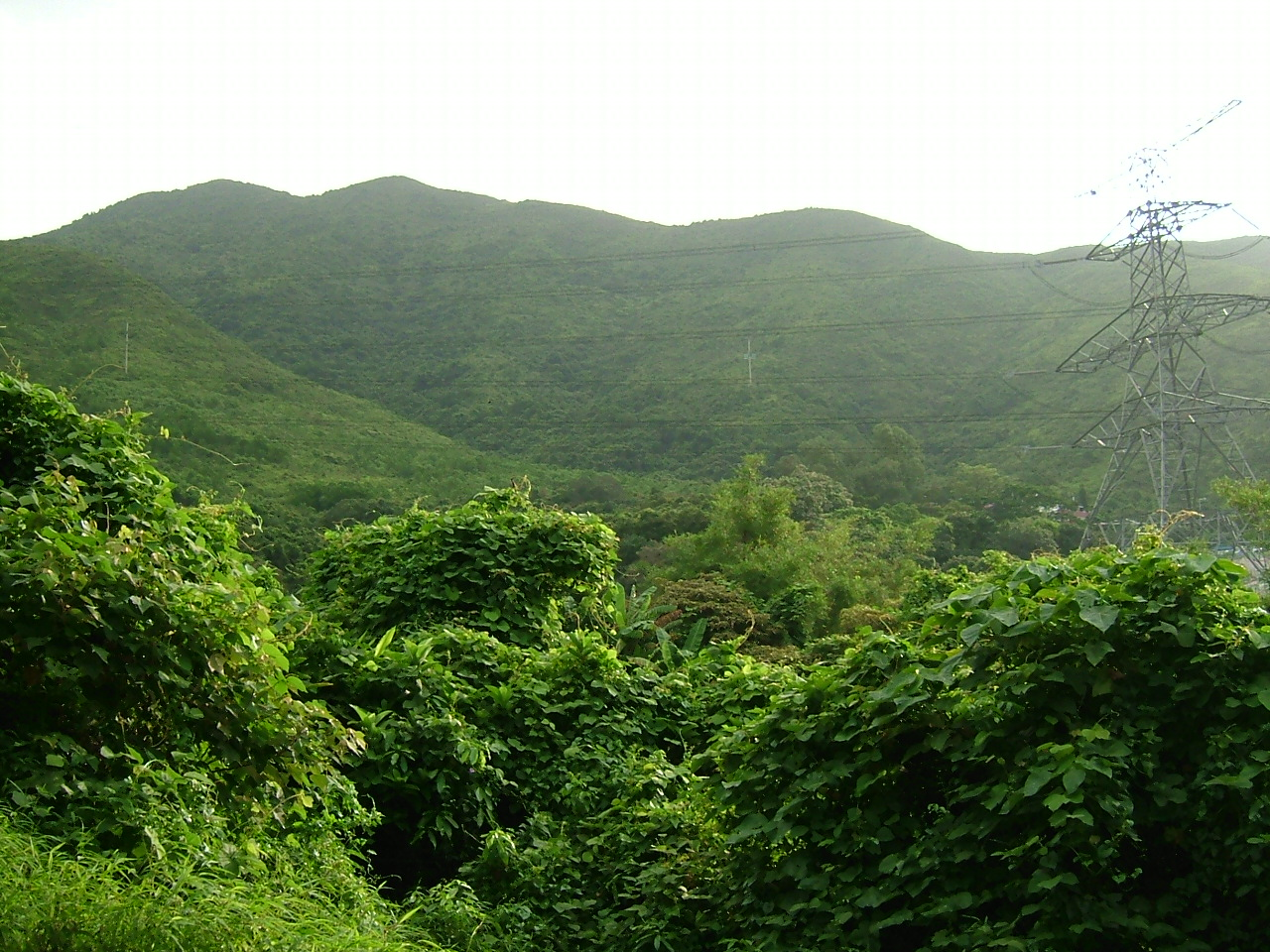
Tseung Kwan O hills.

Tseung Kwan O Village (Chinese: 將軍澳村; Jyutping: zoeng1 gwan1 ou3 cyun1) is a community in the Tseung Kwan O area, in the Sai Kung District of Hong Kong.

== Administration ==
Tseung Kwan O Village is a recognized village under the New Territories Small House Policy.

== Geography ==
Lying at the northern tip of Junk Bay the village rests at the foot of a small mountain. Before major development in the 1970s by the Hong Kong Government, the ocean was a mere 100 feet (30 m) away but the land has since been reclaimed and an urban area built upon it.

== History ==
Tseung Kwan O Village was founded in the early Ming dynasty. The village was abandoned during the Great Clearance in the early Qing dynasty. When the ban was lifted in the late 17th Century, the villagers returned and re-established the village.

The inhabitants of the village are mostly native to Hong Kong. They are mainly from the 'Ng' and 'Chan' families, with the village head in 2006 being a 'Ng'. A British Law passed in 1895 declared inhabitants of various villages native to the territory and granted them special land, burial and inheritance rights. However, as land becomes more scarce and expensive, many people are challenging this old law. The old Tseung Kwan O dialect is also becoming a thing of the past as new generations no longer know how to speak their ancestor's tongue, except for a few youngsters who carry on the tradition. The village head now is 'Chan'.

At the time of the 1911 census, the population of Tseung Kwan O was 193. The number of males was 90.

Tseung Kwan O Village used to be a small fishing and horticultural village. Dynamite and nets were often the normal tools for fishing and simple rope traps were used to trap owls for dried meat. Villages also used to have annual celebrations and trading with each other. However, this old way of life has been disrupted by urbanization and the landscape has been altered by sea reclamation.

== Features ==
A power sub-station of CLP Group is located in the vicinity of Tseung Kwan O Village.

== See also ==
- List of villages in Hong Kong
- Po Tsui Park
