= Sandwich class =

Singaporeans and Hongkongers in the middle of the social hierarchy

- Traditional Chinese: 夾心階層
- Simplified Chinese: 夹心阶层
Transcriptions
Standard Mandarin
- Hanyu Pinyin: Jiāxīn Jiēcéng
Yue: Cantonese
- Yale Romanization: gaap sām gāai chàhng
- Jyutping: gaap3 sam1 gaai1 cang4

Sandwich class is an informal term used in Hong Kong and Singapore to refer to the lower middle class.

Generally, the sandwich class consists of lower-middle-class people who feel "squeezed" — although they are not poor, they are not able to achieve their aspirations as people with a higher income.

In Hong Kong, this comprises families with an income of US$20,000–40,000 per year. Per capita income is typically around US$10,000 per year in Hong Kong, so this places them far above the average family in the territory. However, given very high real estate prices, it is nowhere near enough for them to afford a private residence. Hence, they are "sandwiched" between the large population who truly need public assistance, and the smaller number of people who can afford private residences and other luxury goods.

In Singapore, the sandwich class typically refers to the middle class who are "sandwiched" between having luxuries and basic necessities. They generally have to support ageing parents and growing children. Their household income are usually around SGD $10,000. Typical issues range from unable to upgrade to private property, inability to enjoy a lifestyle or the means to support such a lifestyle, taking care of parents and children and inability to retire early.

== See also ==
- Sandwich generation
- Sandwich Class Housing Scheme in Hong Kong
- My Home Purchase Plan
