= Verbena Heights =

Public housing estate in Tseung Kwan O, Hong Kong

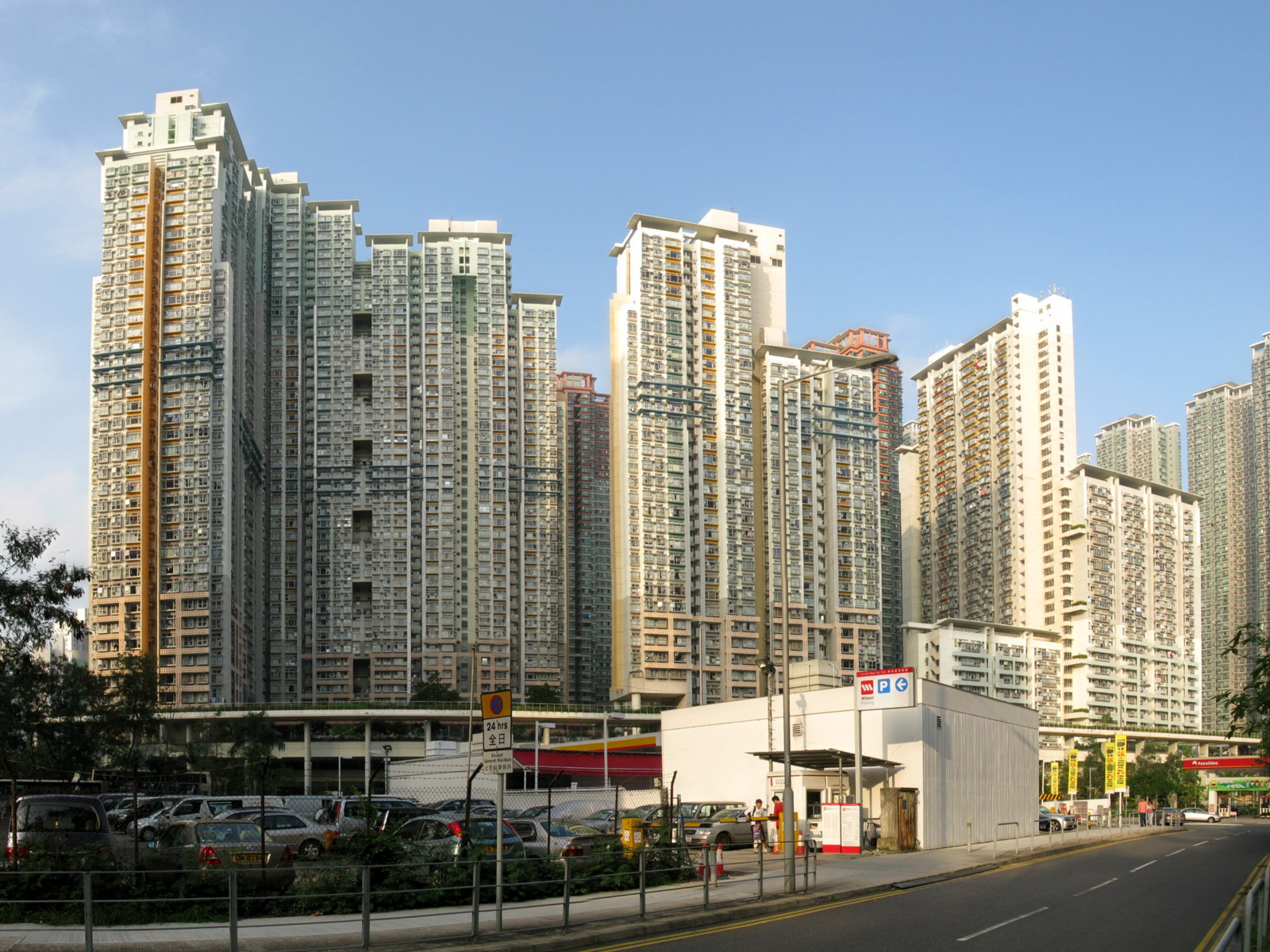
- Verbena Heights
- Interactive map of Verbena Heights

General information
- Location: 8 Mau Tai Road, Tseung Kwan O New Territories, Hong Kong
- Coordinates: 22.3219354°N 114.255848°E
- Status: Completed
- Category: Public rental housing
- Population: 6,661 (2016)
- No. of blocks: 7
- No. of units: 2,865

Construction
- Constructed: 1996; 30 years ago
- Authority: Hong Kong Housing Society

Verbena Heights (Chinese: 茵怡花園) is a Flat-for-Sale Scheme public housing estate in Po Lam, Tseung Kwan O, New Territories, Hong Kong located on reclaimed land near MTR Po Lam station. It now consists of seven residential buildings with a total of 1,894 saleable units and 971 rental units, built between 1996 and 1997 by Hong Kong Housing Society. It is an attempt to design environmentally-responsible housing. It received a Silver Medal at the 1998 Hong Kong Institute of Architects Annual Awards.

== Demographics ==
According to the 2016 by-census, Verbena Heights had a population of 6,661. The median age was 48.9 and the majority of residents (96 per cent) were of Chinese ethnicity. The average household size was 2.4 people. The median monthly household income of all households (i.e. including both economically active and inactive households) was HK$29,500.

== Politics ==
Verbena Heights is located in Wai Yan constituency of the Sai Kung District Council. It was formerly represented by Chun Hoi-shing, who was elected in the 2019 elections until July 2021.

== See also ==
- Public housing estates in Tseung Kwan O
