= Yau Yue Wan Village =

Village in Hong Kong

Coordinates: 22.327134°N 114.260594°E

Yau Yue Wan Village (Chinese: 魷魚灣村) is a village in the Po Lam area of Tseung Kwan O, in the Sai Kung District of Hong Kong.

== Administration ==
Yau Yue Wan is a recognized village under the New Territories Small House Policy.

== History ==
At the time of the 1911 census, the population of Yau Yue Wan was 116. The number of males was 53.
