= Po Lam Estate =

Public housing estate in Tseung Kwan O, Hong Kong

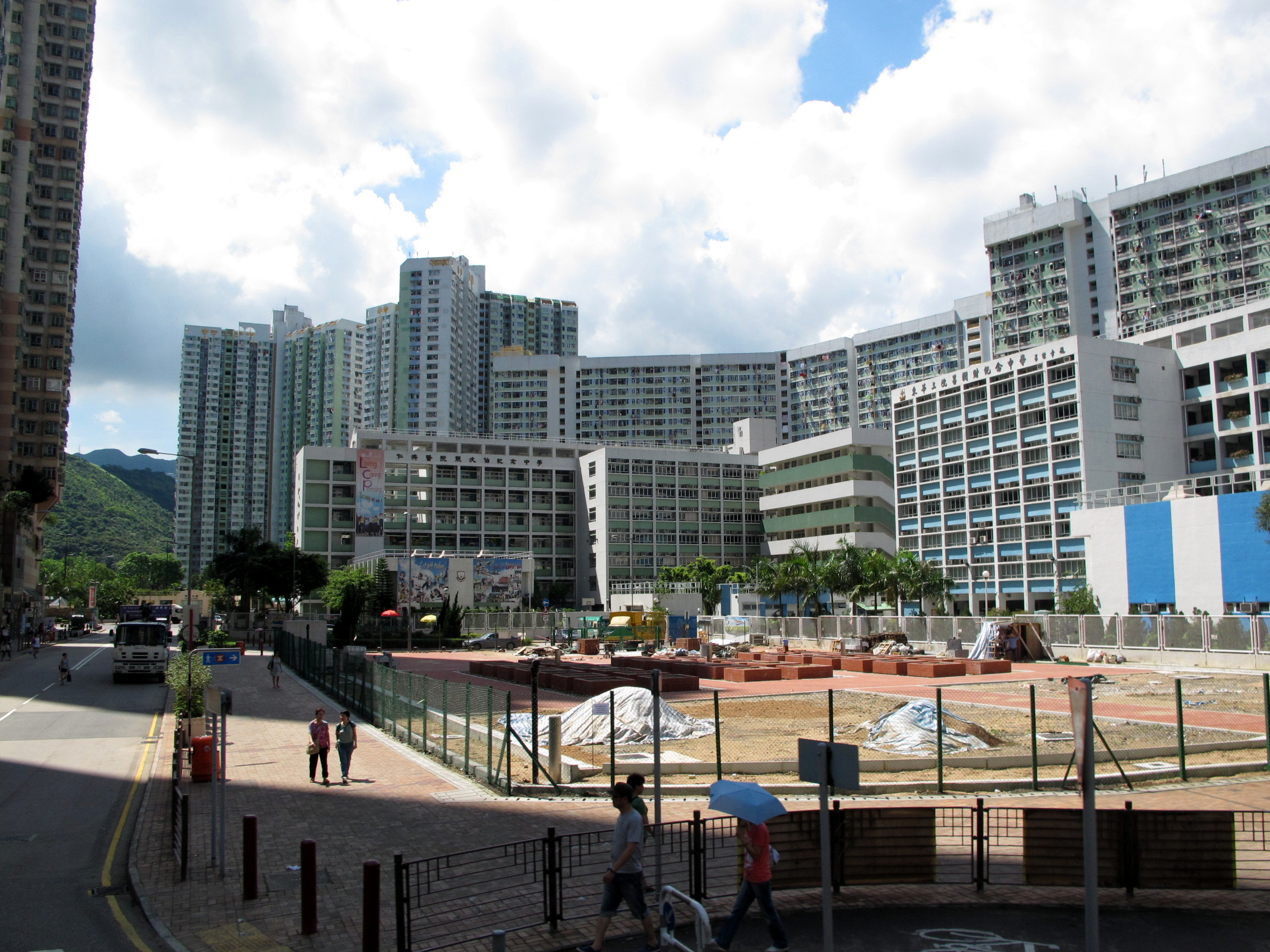
- Po Lam Estate
- Interactive map of Po Lam Estate

General information
- Location: 18 Po Lam Road North, Tseung Kwan O New Territories, Hong Kong
- Coordinates: 22.32607°N 114.2558°E
- Status: Completed
- Category: Public rental housing
- Population: 15,319 (2016)
- No. of blocks: 7
- No. of units: 2,322

Construction
- Constructed: 1988; 38 years ago
- Authority: Hong Kong Housing Authority

Po Lam Estate (Chinese: 寶林邨) is a mixed TPS and public housing estate in Tseung Kwan O, New Territories, Hong Kong, near Metro City and MTR Po Lam station. It is the first public housing estate in Tseung Kwan O and has a total of seven residential blocks with 5,272 units. Some of the flats were sold to tenants through Tenants Purchase Scheme Phase 6A in 2004.

Ying Ming Court (英明苑) and Yan Ming Court (欣明苑) are Home Ownership Scheme housing courts in Tseung Kwan O near Po Lam Estate, built in 1989 and 1990 respectively.

== Houses ==
=== Po Lam Estate ===
Name	Chinese name	Building type	Completed
Po Ning House	寶寧樓	New Slab	1988
Po Kan House	寶勤樓	New Slab	1988
Po Yan House	寶仁樓	Trident 2	1988
Po Tai House	寶泰樓	Trident 2	1988
Po Tak House	寶德樓	Trident 2	1988
Po Chi House	寶智樓	Trident 2	1988
Po Kim House	寶儉樓	Small Household Block	2001

=== Ying Ming Court ===
Name	Chinese name	Building type	Completed
Ming Yuen House	明遠閣	New Cruciform (Ver.1984)	1989
Ming Leung House	明亮閣	New Cruciform (Ver.1984)	1989
Ming Tat House	明達閣	New Cruciform (Ver.1984)	1989
Ming Chi House	明志閣	New Cruciform (Ver.1984)	1989
Ming On House	明安閣	New Cruciform (Ver.1984)	1989

=== Yan Ming Court ===
Name	Chinese name	Building type	Completed
Yan Chung House	欣松閣	New Cruciform (Ver.1984)	1990
Yan Chuk House	欣竹閣	New Cruciform (Ver.1984)	1990
Yan Mui House	欣梅閣	New Cruciform (Ver.1984)	1990
Yan Lan House	欣蘭閣	New Cruciform (Ver.1984)	1990
Yan Kuk House	欣菊閣	New Cruciform (Ver.1984)	1990

== Demographics ==
According to the 2016 by-census, Po Lam Estate had a population of 15,319, Ying Ming Court had a population of 5,058 while Yan Ming Court had a population of 4,604. Altogether the population amounts to 24,981.

== Politics ==
For the 2019 District Council election, the estate fell within two constituencies. Po Lam Estate falls within the Po Lam constituency, which was formerly represented by Fung Kwan-on until July 2021, while Ying Ming Court and Yan Ming Court falls within the Yan Ying constituency, which was formerly represented by Ben Chung Kam-lun until May 2021.

== See also ==
- Public housing estates in Tseung Kwan O
