= Hong King (constituency) =

Constituency of the Sai Kung District Council of Hong Kong

- Elected constituency for the Sai Kung District Council
- Boundary of Hong King in Sai Kung District
- District: Sai Kung
- Legislative Council constituency: New Territories South East
- Population: 17,828 (2019)
- Electorate: 12,482 (2019)

Current constituency
- Created: 1994
- Number of members: One
- Member: vacant

Hong King is one of the 27 constituencies in the Sai Kung District in Hong Kong. The constituency returns one district councillor to the Sai Kung District Council, with an election every four years.

Hong King constituency is loosely based on Hong Sing Garden and King Ming Court, also with four private housing estates in Tseung Kwan O with estimated population of 17,828.

== Councillors represented ==
Election	Member	Party
1994	Law Cheung-kwok	ADPL→Independent
1999	Law Cheung-kwok	Independent→Civil Force
2003	Law Cheung-kwok	Civil Force
2007	Frankie Lam Siu-chung→Vacant	Democratic
2011	Frankie Lam Siu-chung→Vacant	Democratic
2015	Frankie Lam Siu-chung→Vacant	Democratic→Neo Democrats
2019	Frankie Lam Siu-chung→Vacant	Neo Democrats→Independent

== Election results ==
=== 2010s ===
Sai Kung District Council Election, 2019: Hong King
Party	Candidate	Votes	%	±%
Neo Democrats	Frankie Lam Siu-chung	4,037	65.36	+8.16
NPP (Civil Force)	Ken Chan Kin-chun	2,140	34.64	−8.16
Majority		1,897	30.72	
Turnout		6,237	74.13	
Neo Democrats hold		Swing		

Sai Kung District Council Election, 2015: Hong King
Party	Candidate	Votes	%	±%
Democratic	Frankie Lam Siu-chung	3,274	57.2	–2.0
NPP (Civil Force)	Ken Chan Kin-chun	2,446	42.8	+2.0
Majority		828	4.4	
Turnout		5,796	51.2	
Democratic hold		Swing	–2.0	

Sai Kung District Council Election, 2011: Hong King
Party	Candidate	Votes	%	±%
Democratic	Frankie Lam Siu-chung	2,531	59.2	
Civil Force	Leung Lok-sum	1,742	40.8	
Democratic hold		Swing		

=== 2000s ===
Sai Kung District Council Election, 2007: Hong King
Party	Candidate	Votes	%	±%
Democratic	Frankie Lam Siu-chung	1,652	47.5	
Nonpartisan (Civil Force)	Law Cheung-kwok	1,032	29.7	
Liberal	Wong Yiu-wai	649	18.7	
Independent	Cheng Kai-lok	108	3.1	
Chinese Labor	Shum See-hoi	37	1.1	
Democratic gain from Civil Force		Swing		

Sai Kung District Council Election, 2003: Hong King
Party	Candidate	Votes	%	±%
Civil Force	Law Cheung-kwok	1,558	50.3	
Independent	Au Kwok-piu	1,540	49.7	
Civil Force hold		Swing		

=== 1990s ===
Sai Kung District Council Election, 1999: Hong King
Party	Candidate	Votes	%	±%
Independent	Law Cheung-kwok	1,359	51.7	
Independent	Kenny Lee Kwun-yee	1,240	47.2	
Independent hold		Swing		

Sai Kung District Council Election, 1994: Hong King
Party	Candidate	Votes	%	±%
ADPL	Law Cheung-kwok	604	37.8	
Democratic	Kwok Kam-ming	529	33.1	
Liberal	Mak Yau-kit	459	28.7	
ADPL win (new seat)				
