= Bauhinia Garden =

Public housing estate in Tseung Kwan O, Hong Kong

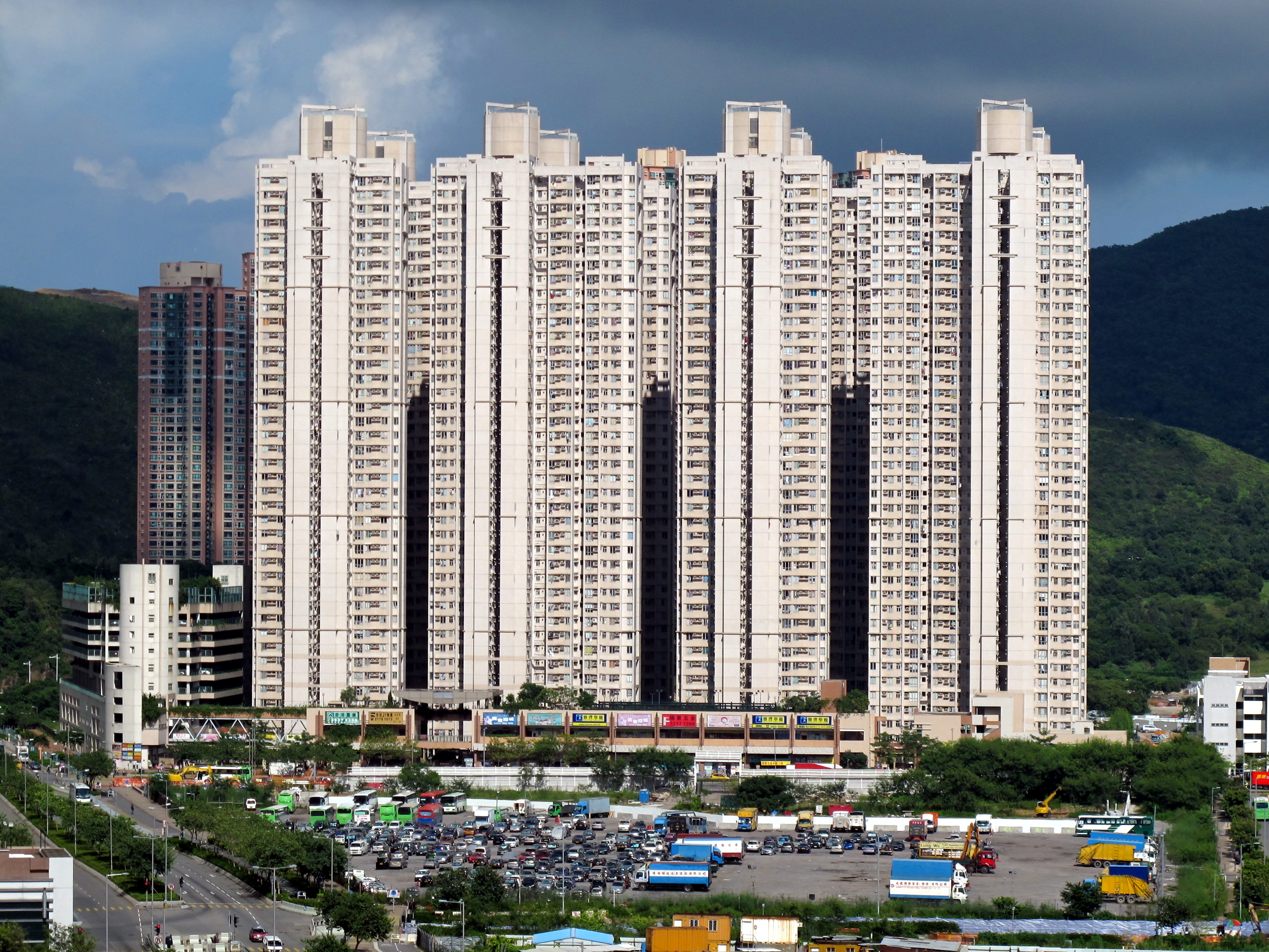
- Bauhinia Garden
- Interactive map of Bauhinia Garden

General information
- Location: 11 Tong Chun Street, Tseung Kwan O New Territories, Hong Kong
- Coordinates: 22.30651°N 114.26232°E
- Status: Completed
- Category: Public rental housing
- Population: 9,684 (2016)
- No. of blocks: 8
- No. of units: 3,200

Construction
- Constructed: 2001; 25 years ago
- Contractors: Shui On Group
- Authority: Hong Kong Housing Authority

Bauhinia Garden (Chinese: 寶盈花園) is a Home Ownership Scheme and Private Sector Participation Scheme court in Tseung Kwan O, New Territories, Hong Kong near Tseung Kwan O Plaza, The Grandiose and MTR Tseung Kwan O station. It was jointly developed by the Hong Kong Housing Authority and Shui On Group, and has a total of eight blocks built on reclaimed land and was completed in 2001.

== Houses ==
Name	Chinese name	Building type	Completed
Tower 1	第1座	Private Sector Participation Scheme	2001
Tower 2	第2座	Private Sector Participation Scheme	2001
Tower 3	第3座	Private Sector Participation Scheme	2001
Tower 4	第4座	Private Sector Participation Scheme	2001
Tower 5	第5座	Private Sector Participation Scheme	2001
Tower 6	第6座	Private Sector Participation Scheme	2001
Tower 7	第7座	Private Sector Participation Scheme	2001
Tower 8	第8座	Private Sector Participation Scheme	2001

== Demographics ==
According to the 2016 by-census, Bauhinia Garden had a population of 9,684. The median age was 44.7 and the majority of residents (96 per cent) were of Chinese ethnicity. The average household size was 3.1 people. The median monthly household income of all households (i.e. including both economically active and inactive households) was HK$33,560.

== Politics ==
Bauhinia Garden is located in Po Yee constituency of the Sai Kung District Council. It was formerly represented by Tse Ching-fung, who was elected in the 2019 elections until July 2021.

== See also ==
- Public housing estates in Tseung Kwan O
