= Beverly Garden =

Public housing estate in Tseung Kwan O, Hong Kong

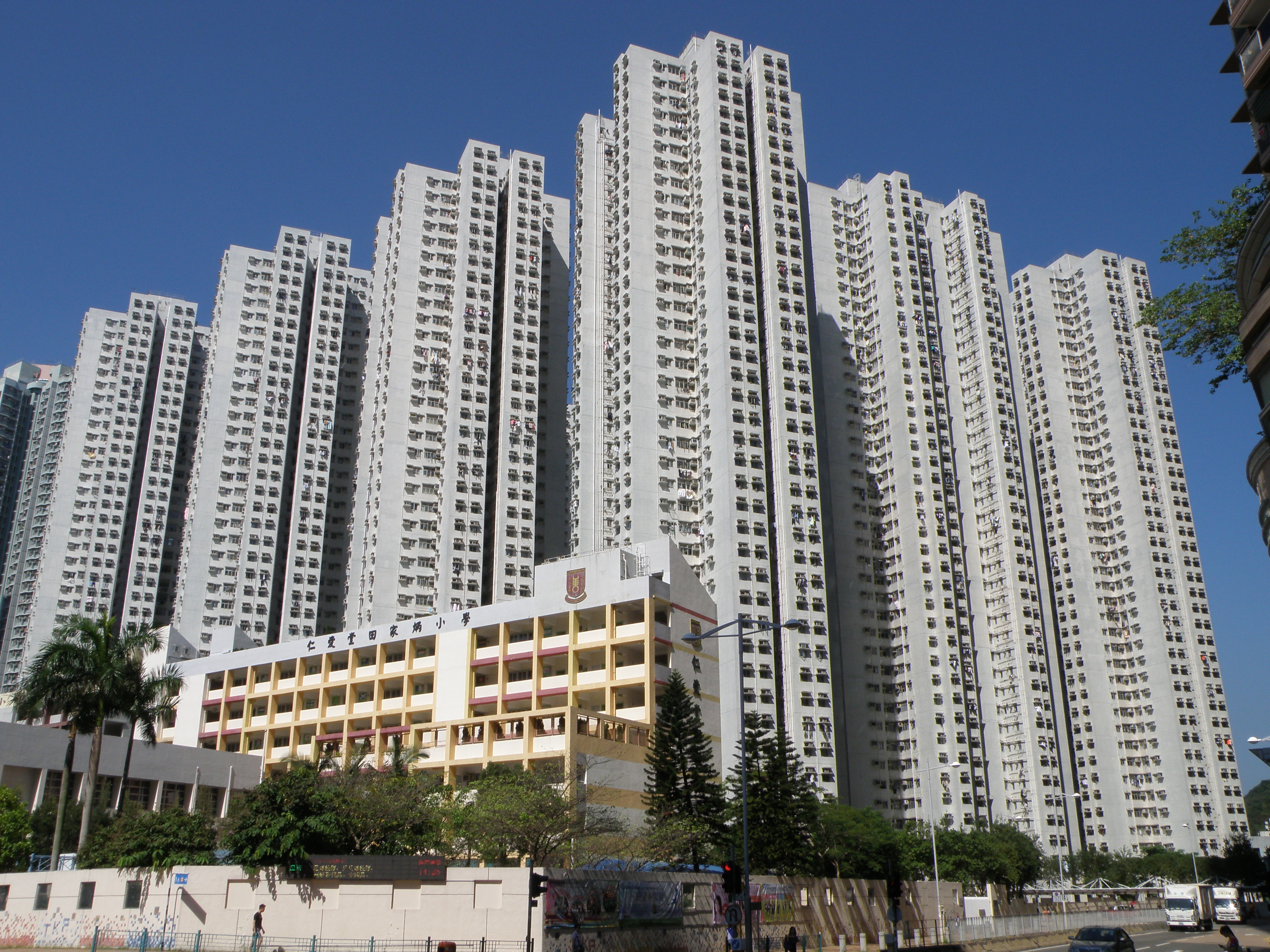
- Beverly Garden
- Interactive map of Beverly Garden

General information
- Location: 1 Tong Ming Street, Tseung Kwan O New Territories, Hong Kong
- Coordinates: 22.31043°N 114.26185°E
- Status: Completed
- Category: Public rental housing
- Population: 12,663 (2016)
- No. of blocks: 10
- No. of units: 3,966

Construction
- Constructed: 1998; 28 years ago
- Contractors: Chevalier Group
- Authority: Hong Kong Housing Authority

Beverly Garden (Chinese: 富康花園) is a Home Ownership Scheme and Private Sector Participation Scheme court in Tseung Kwan O, New Territories, Hong Kong near Tseung Kwan O Plaza, Tseung Kwan O Sports Ground, The Grandiose and MTR Tseung Kwan O station. It was jointly developed by the Hong Kong Housing Authority and Chevalier Group, and has a total of ten blocks built on reclaimed land and was completed in 1998.

== Houses ==
Name	Chinese name	Building type	Completed
Block 1	第1座	Private Sector Participation Scheme	1998
Block 2	第2座	Private Sector Participation Scheme	1998
Block 3	第3座	Private Sector Participation Scheme	1998
Block 4	第4座	Private Sector Participation Scheme	1998
Block 5	第5座	Private Sector Participation Scheme	1998
Block 6	第6座	Private Sector Participation Scheme	1998
Block 7	第7座	Private Sector Participation Scheme	1998
Block 8	第8座	Private Sector Participation Scheme	1998
Block 9	第9座	Private Sector Participation Scheme	1998
Block 10	第10座	Private Sector Participation Scheme	1998

== Demographics ==
According to the 2016 by-census, Beverly Garden had a population of 12,663. The median age was 45.1 and the majority of residents (95.8 per cent) were of Chinese ethnicity. The average household size was 3.2 people. The median monthly household income of all households (i.e. including both economically active and inactive households) was HK$34,300.

== Politics ==
Beverly Garden is located in Fu Kwan constituency of the Sai Kung District Council. It was formerly represented by Luk Ping-choi, who was elected in the 2019 elections until July 2021.

== See also ==
- Public housing estates in Tseung Kwan O
