= Po Yee (constituency) =

Constituency of the Sai Kung District Council of Hong Kong

- Elected constituency for the Sai Kung District Council
- Boundary of Po Yee in Sai Kung District
- District: Sai Kung
- Legislative Council constituency: New Territories South East
- Population: 15,330 (2019)
- Electorate: 9,520 (2019)

Current constituency
- Created: 2011
- Number of members: One
- Member: vacant

Po Yee (Chinese: 寶怡) is one of the 29 constituencies in the Sai Kung District.

The constituency returns one district councillor to the Sai Kung District Council, with an election every four years.

Po Yee constituency is loosely based on Bauhinia Garden and Yee Ming Estate in Tseung Kwan O with estimated population of 15,330.

== Councillors represented ==
Election	Member	Party
2011	Ng Suet-shan	FTU
2015	Tse Ching-fung→Vacant	Democratic
2018	Tse Ching-fung→Vacant	CGPLTKO

== Election results ==
=== 2010s ===
Sai Kung District Council Election, 2019: Po Yee
Party	Candidate	Votes	%	±%
Ind. democrat	Tse Ching-fung	4,121	60.11	
FTU	Chu Lam	2,480	36.17	
Independent	Wong Heung-yin	255	3.72	
Majority		1,641	23.94	
Turnout		6,865	72.18	
Ind. democrat hold		Swing		
