= Public housing estates in Tseung Kwan O =

Public housing in Tseung Kwan O, Hong Kong

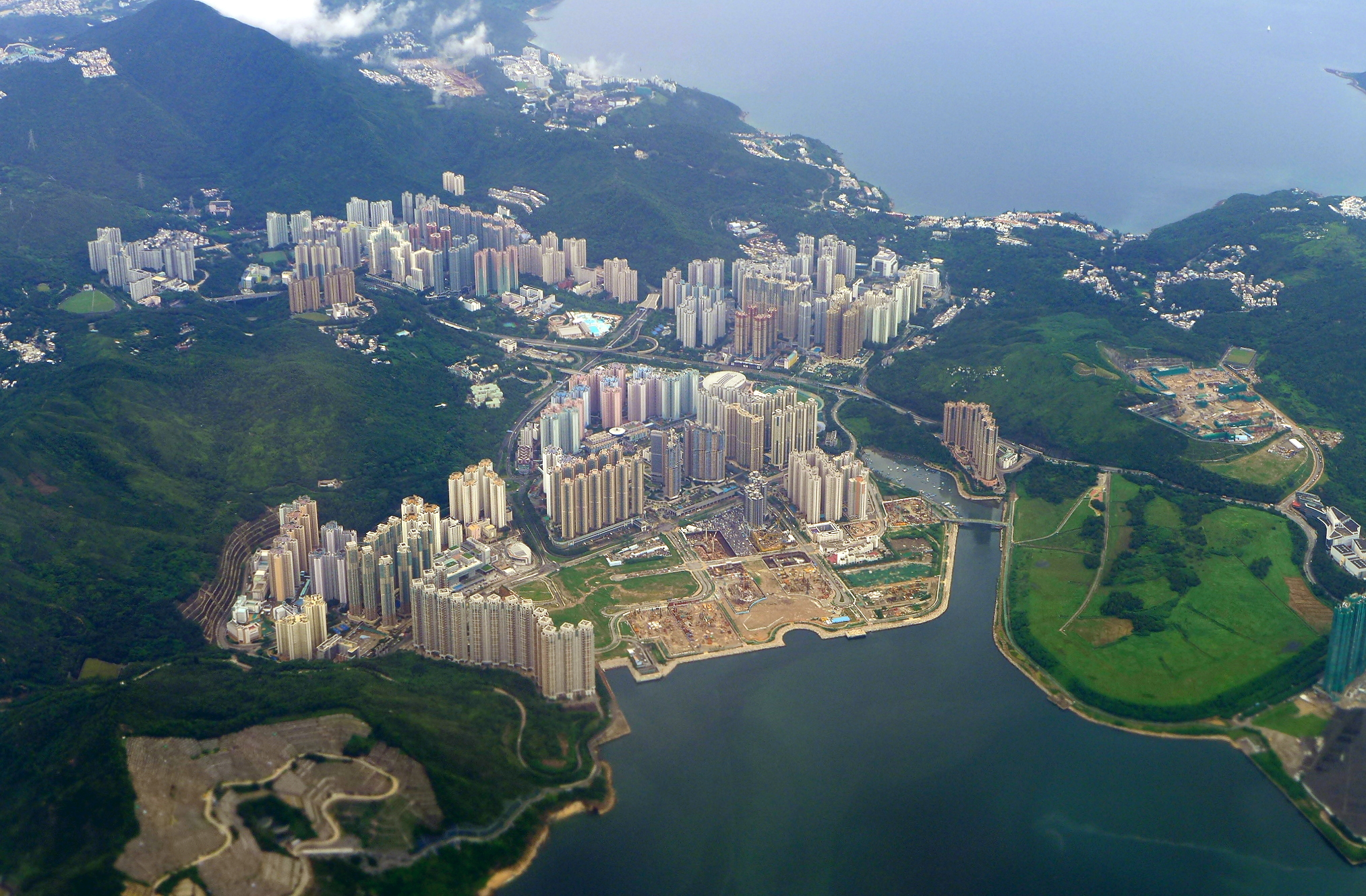
An aerial view of Tseung Kwan O New Town from 2014

The public housing estates in Tseung Kwan O is a public housing project in Tseung Kwan O. Its first buildings were inaugurated in 1988.

== The History ==
With the exception of Tsui Lam Estate, King Ming Court and Hong Sing Garden, all the public housing and HOS estates in Tseung Kwan O are built on the reclaimed land of Junk Bay.

In the 1990s, cracks were found at various places around On Ning Garden, Fu Ning Garden, Tong Ming Court, Beverly Garden and Bauhinia Garden. The estates were also found unusual soil settlement on their reclaimed land when the MTR Tseung Kwan O line was being constructed. After investigation, the government explained that the settlement occurred due to consolidation of soil layers overlying the bedrock when groundwater was lost to the sewage collection tunnels and not adequately replenished from the surface. But the government emphasized that the buildings built on the reclaimed land were still safe.

== The Overview ==
Name		Type	Inaug.	No Blocks	No Units	Notes
Bauhinia Garden	寶盈花園	PSPS	2001	8	3,200	
Beverly Garden	富康花園	PSPS	1998	10	3,966	
Choi Ming Court	彩明苑	Public/HOS	2001	10	4,720	
Chung Ming Court	頌明苑	HOS	1993	5	1,750	
Fu Ning Garden	富寧花園	PSPS	1990	6	2,450	
Hau Tak Estate	厚德邨	Public	1993	6	4,271	
Hin Ming Court	顯明苑	HOS	1996	1	759	
Ho Ming Court	浩明苑	HOS	1990	1	816	
Hong Sing Garden	康盛花園	PSPS	1989	5	1,850	
Jolly Place	樂頤居	Senior Citizen	2003	1	243	HK Housing Society
Kin Ming Estate	健明邨	Public	2003	10	7,018	
King Lam Estate	景林邨	TPS	1990	7	2,047	
King Ming Court	景明苑	HOS	1988	3	1,050	
Kwong Ming Court	廣明苑	HOS	1998	7	4,256	
Mount Verdant	翠嶺峰	SSFP	2021	1	330	HK Housing Society
Ming Tak Estate	明德邨	Public	1996	2	1,561	
On Ning Garden	安寧花園	PSPS	1991	6	2,300	
Po Lam Estate	寶林邨	TPS	1988	7	2,322	
Po Ming Court	寶明苑	HOS	1998	2	1,476	
Radiant Towers	旭輝臺	Sandwich	1998	2	704	HK Housing Society
Sheung Tak Estate	尚德邨	Public	1998	9	5,561	
Shin Ming Estate	善明邨	Public	2011	2	2,000	
Tong Ming Court	唐明苑	HOS	1999	3	1,920	
The Pinnacle	疊翠軒	Sandwich	1999	4	1,424	HK Housing Society
Tsui Lam Estate	翠林邨	TPS	1988	8	2,839	
Wo Ming Court	和明苑	HOS	1999	4	1,640	
Verbena Heights	茵怡花園	Flat-for-Sale/Rental	1996	7	2,865	HK Housing Society
Yan Ming Court	欣明苑	HOS	1990	5	1,750	
Yee Ming Estate	怡明邨	Public	2014	3	2,059	
Ying Ming Court	英明苑	HOS	1989	5	1,750	
Yu Ming Court	裕明苑	HOS	1994	2	1,216	
Yuk Ming Court	煜明苑	HOS	1996	3	1,824	
Yung Ming Court	雍明苑	HOS	2020	2	1,395	
Chiu Ming Court	昭明苑	HOS	2025	1	594	

== Estates ==
=== Bauhinia Garden ===
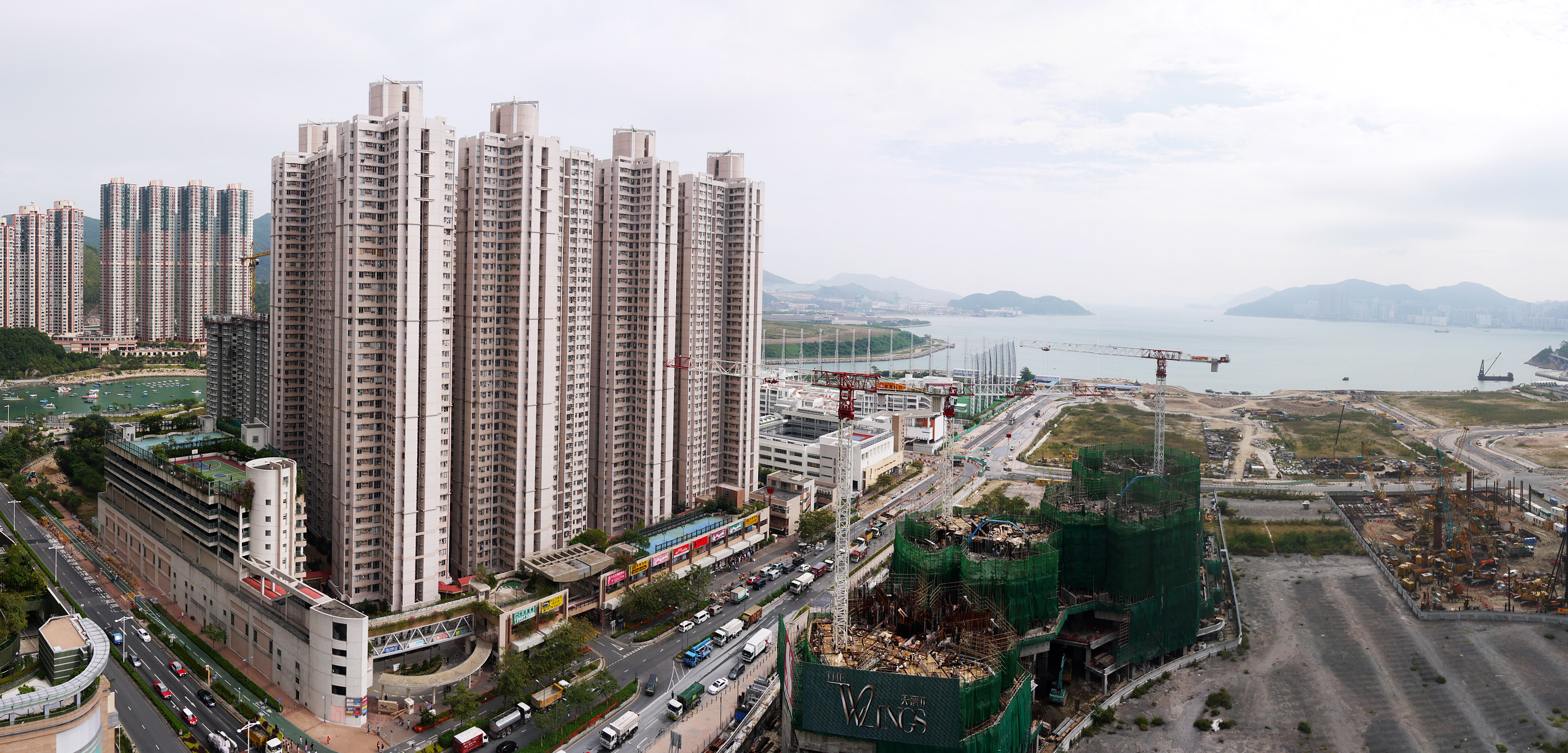
Bauhinia Garden

Bauhinia Garden (Chinese: 寶盈花園) is a HOS and PSPS estate, located near Tseung Kwan O Plaza, The Grandiose, Tseung Kwan O station. It was jointly developed by the Hong Kong Housing Authority and Shui On Group. It consists of 8 residential blocks built on the reclaimed land and completed in 2001. In the 1990s, it suffered serious unusual ground settlement when Tseung Kwan O line was being constructed.

Name	Type	Completion
Block 1	Private Sector Participation Scheme	2001
Block 2	Private Sector Participation Scheme	2001
Block 3	Private Sector Participation Scheme	2001
Block 4	Private Sector Participation Scheme	2001
Block 5	Private Sector Participation Scheme	2001
Block 6	Private Sector Participation Scheme	2001
Block 7	Private Sector Participation Scheme	2001
Block 8	Private Sector Participation Scheme	2001

=== Beverly Garden ===
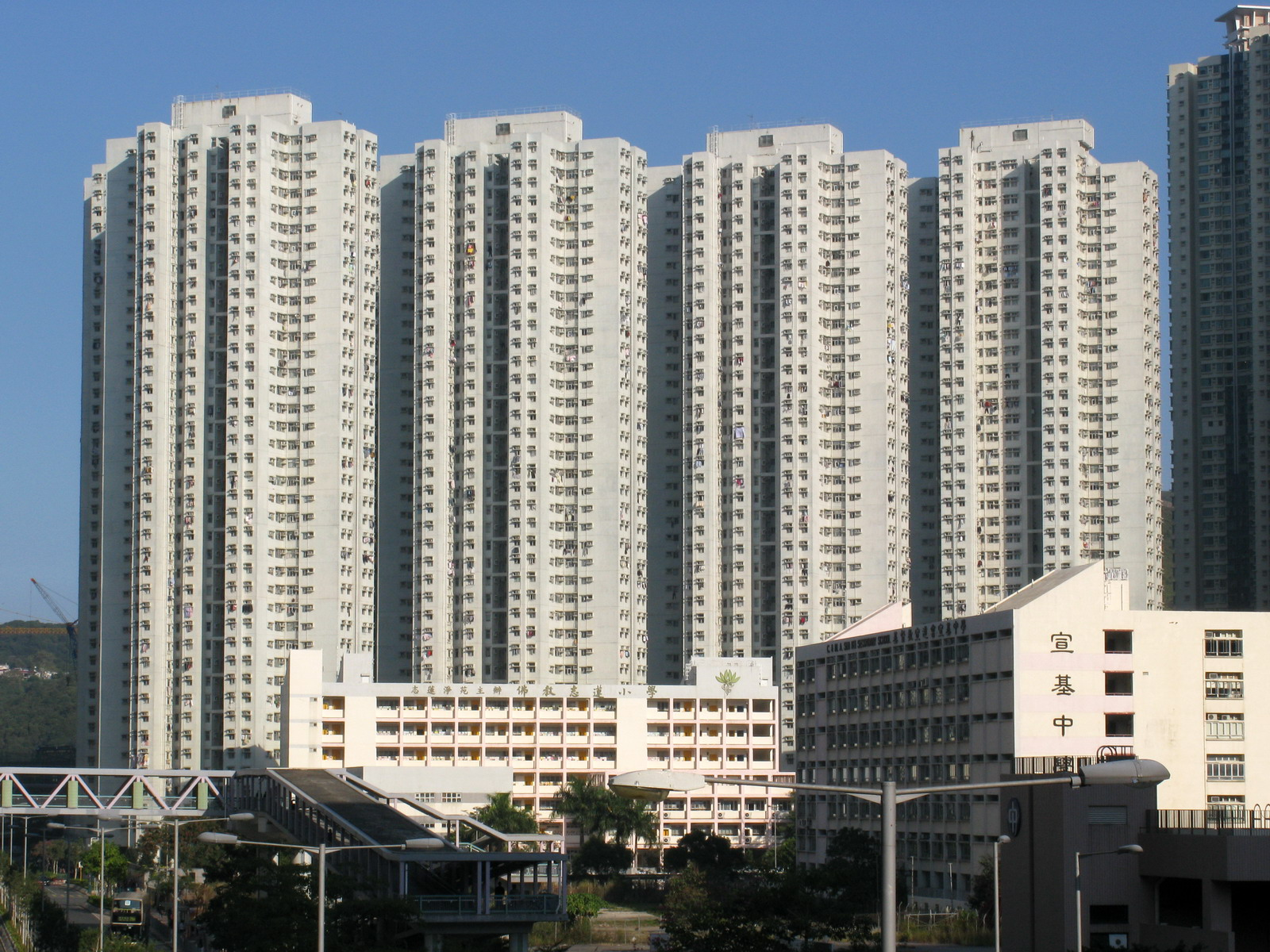
Beverly Garden

Beverly Garden (Chinese: 富康花園) is a HOS and PSPS estate, located near Tseung Kwan O Plaza, The Grandiose, Tseung Kwan O station. It consists of 10 residential blocks built on the reclaimed land and completed in 1998. In the 1990s, it suffered serious unusual ground settlement when Tseung Kwan O line was being constructed.

Name	Type	Completion
Block 1	Private Sector Participation Scheme	1998
Block 2	Private Sector Participation Scheme	1998
Block 3	Private Sector Participation Scheme	1998
Block 4	Private Sector Participation Scheme	1998
Block 5	Private Sector Participation Scheme	1998
Block 6	Private Sector Participation Scheme	1998
Block 7	Private Sector Participation Scheme	1998
Block 8	Private Sector Participation Scheme	1998
Block 9	Private Sector Participation Scheme	1998
Block 10	Private Sector Participation Scheme	1998

=== Choi Ming Court ===
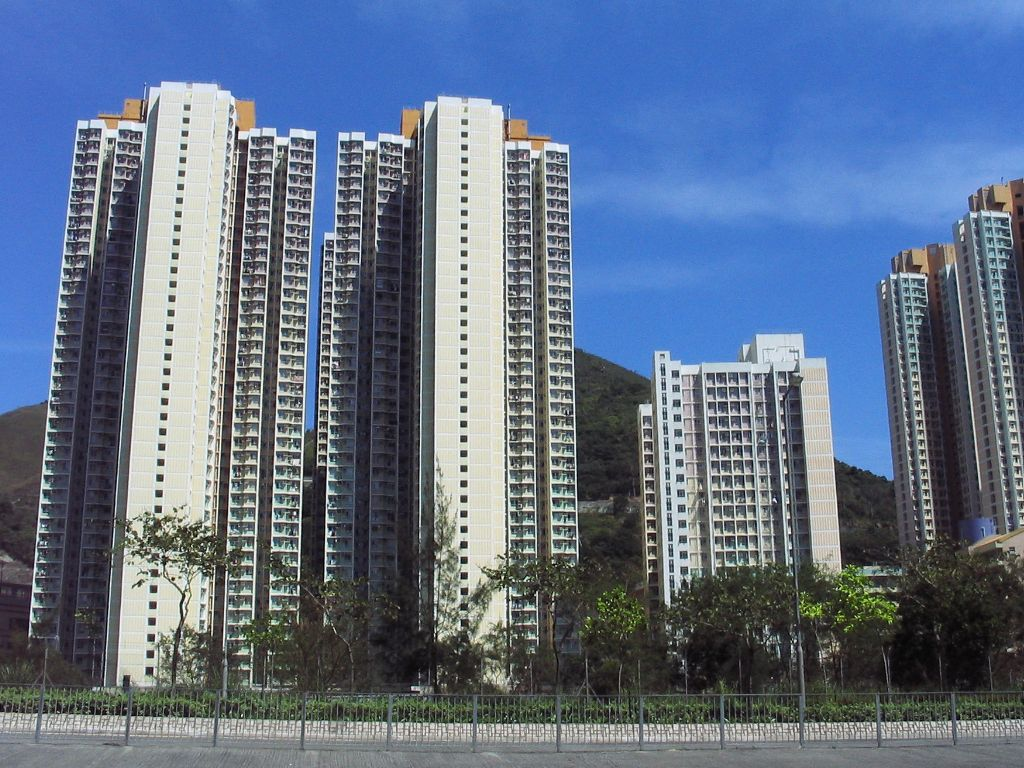
Choi Ming Court (Rental housing)

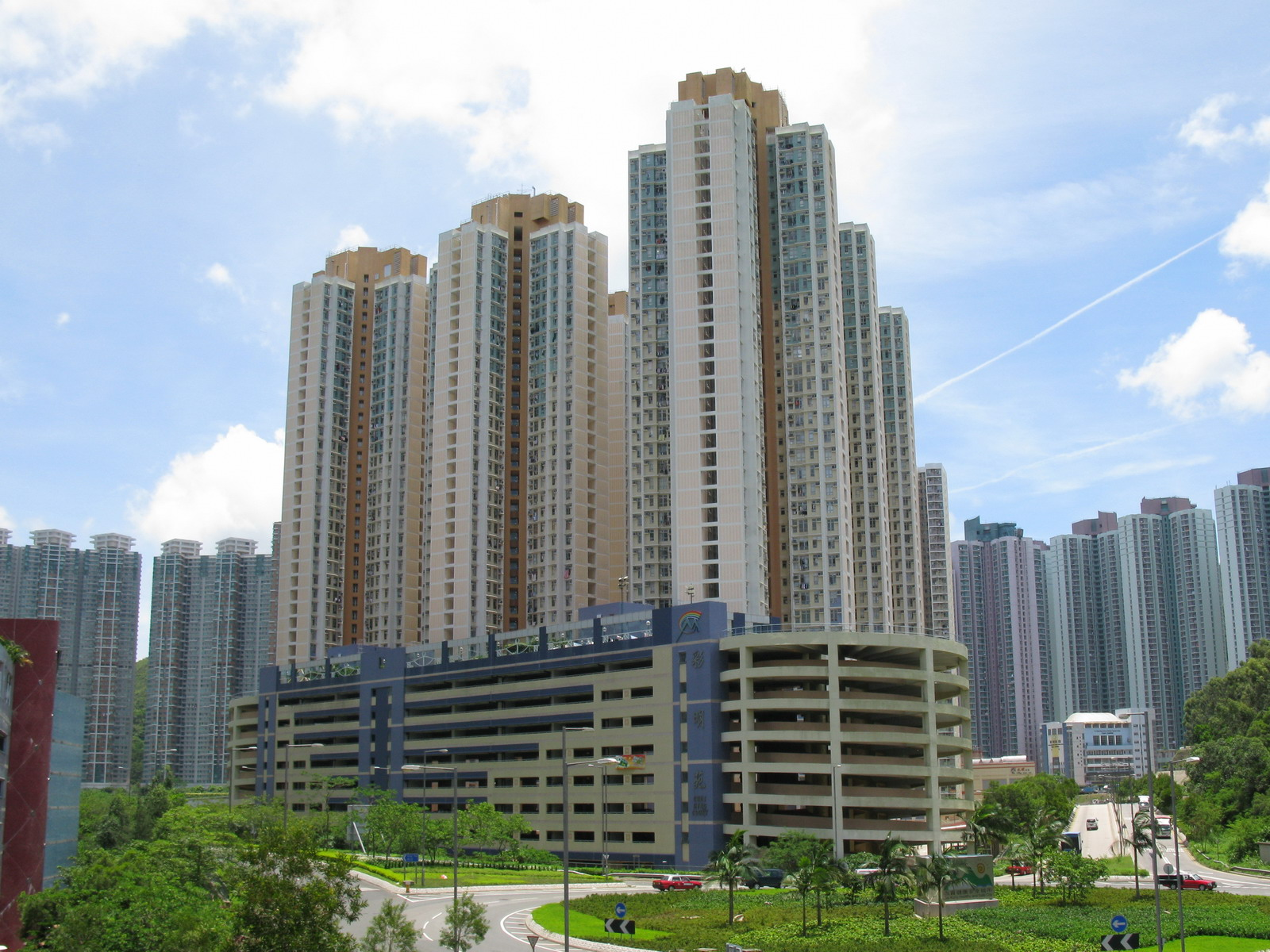
Choi Ming Court (HOS)

Choi Ming Court (Chinese: 彩明苑) is a public estate and a HOS/PSPS estate in Tiu Keng Leng. It is the seventh public housing estate. It consists of 10 residential blocks (4 for rental and 6 for HOS) and a shopping centre completed in 2001.

Name	Type	Completion	Use
Choi Fu House	Harmony 1 Option 5 ( 3.5 Gen.)	2001	rental
Choi Kwai House	Harmony 1 Option 6 ( 3.5 Gen.)	2001	rental
Choi Wing House	Harmony 1 Option 6 ( 3.5 Gen.)	2001	rental
Choi Yiu House	Small Household Block	2001	rental
Choi Yeung House	Concord 1 Option 1	2001	HOS
Choi Lau House	Concord 1 Option 1	2001	HOS
Choi Chung House	Concord 1 Option 1	2001	HOS
Choi Pak House	Concord 1 Option 1	2001	HOS
Choi To House	Concord 1 Option 1	2001	HOS
Choi Mui House	Concord 1 Option 1	2001	HOS

=== Chung Ming Court ===
Chung Ming Court (Chinese: 頌明苑) is a HOS estate, near Hau Tak Estate. It has only 5 blocks built in 1993.

Name	Type	Completion
Kar Ming House	New Cruciform (Ver.1984)	1993
Fai Ming House	New Cruciform (Ver.1984)	1993
Yin Ming House	New Cruciform (Ver.1984)	1993
Tsui Ming House	New Cruciform (Ver.1984)	1993
Koon Ming House	New Cruciform (Ver.1984)	1993

=== Fu Ning Garden ===
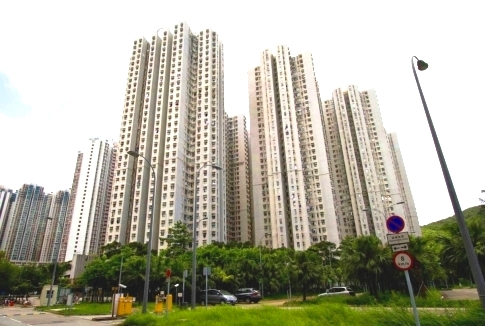
Fu Ning Garden

Fu Ning Garden (Chinese: 富寧花園) is the first HOS and PSPS estate in Hang Hau Area, located near Hang Hau Village and Tseung Kwan O Hospital. It was jointly developed by the Hong Kong Housing Authority and Tak Wing Investment (Holdings) Limited (Renamed as New Smart Energy Group Limited) in 1990. It consists of 6 residential blocks and a shopping arcade built on the reclaimed land. In the 1990s, it suffered unusual ground settlement when Tseung Kwan O line was being constructed.

Name	Type	Completion
Block 1	Private Sector Participation Scheme	1990
Block 2	Private Sector Participation Scheme	1990
Block 3	Private Sector Participation Scheme	1990
Block 4	Private Sector Participation Scheme	1990
Block 5	Private Sector Participation Scheme	1990
Block 6	Private Sector Participation Scheme	1990

=== Hau Tak Estate ===
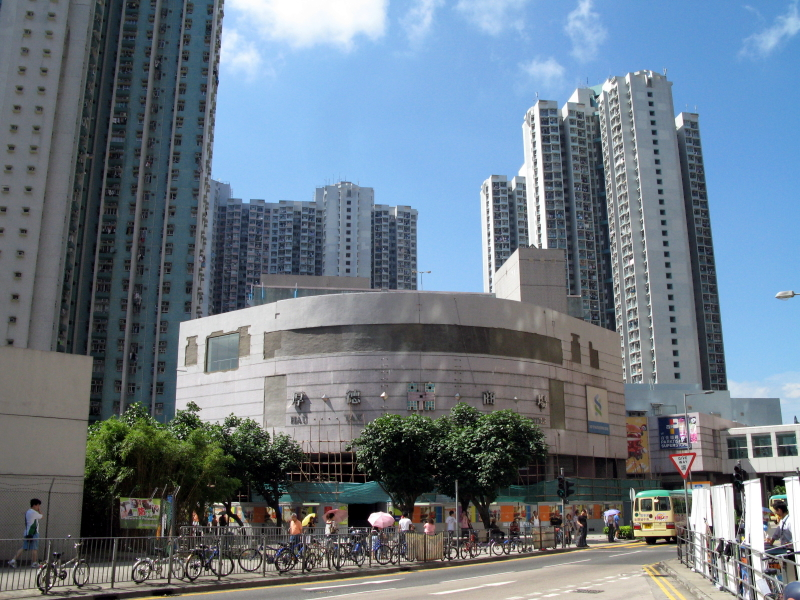
Hau Tak Estate and Hau Tak Shopping Centre

Hau Tak Estate (Chinese: 厚德邨) is the fourth public housing estate. Built between 1993 and 1994, the estate comprises 6 blocks of Harmony I style, providing more than 4,000 rental flats.

Name	Type	Completion
Tak Chak House	Harmony 1 Option 2 (1 Gen.) with Harmony Annex Type 1	1993
Tak Chi House	Harmony 1 Option 2 (1 Gen.)	1993
Tak Fu House	Harmony 1 Option 2 (1 Gen.)	1993
Tak Hong House	Harmony 1 Option 2 (1 Gen.)	1993
Tak On House	Harmony 1 Option 2 (1 Gen.)	1994
Tak Yue House	Harmony 1 Option 2 (1 Gen.)	1994

=== Hin Ming Court ===
Hin Ming Court (Chinese: 顯明苑) is a HOS estate, near Ming Tak Estate. It has only 1 block built in 1996.

Name	Type	Completion
Hin Ming Court	Harmony 1 Option 5 (2 Gen.)	1996

=== Ho Ming Court ===
Ho Ming Court (Chinese: 浩明苑) is a HOS estate, near King Lam Estate. It has only 1 block built in 1990.

Name	Type	Completion
Ho Ming Court	Trident 3 (Late Gen.)	1990

=== Hong Sing Garden ===
Hong Sing Garden (Chinese: 康盛花園) is a HOS and PSPS estate, near Tsui Lam Estate and King Ming Court. It is built at a hill adjacent to Po Lam Road North overlooking Tseung Kwan O Tunnel. It is the only PSPS estate that is not built on the reclaimed land. It was jointly developed by the Hong Kong Housing Authority and Shui On Group. It has 5 blocks built in 1989.

Name	Type	Completion
Block 1	Private Sector Participation Scheme	1989
Block 2	Private Sector Participation Scheme	1989
Block 3	Private Sector Participation Scheme	1989
Block 4	Private Sector Participation Scheme	1989
Block 5	Private Sector Participation Scheme	1989

=== Jolly Place ===
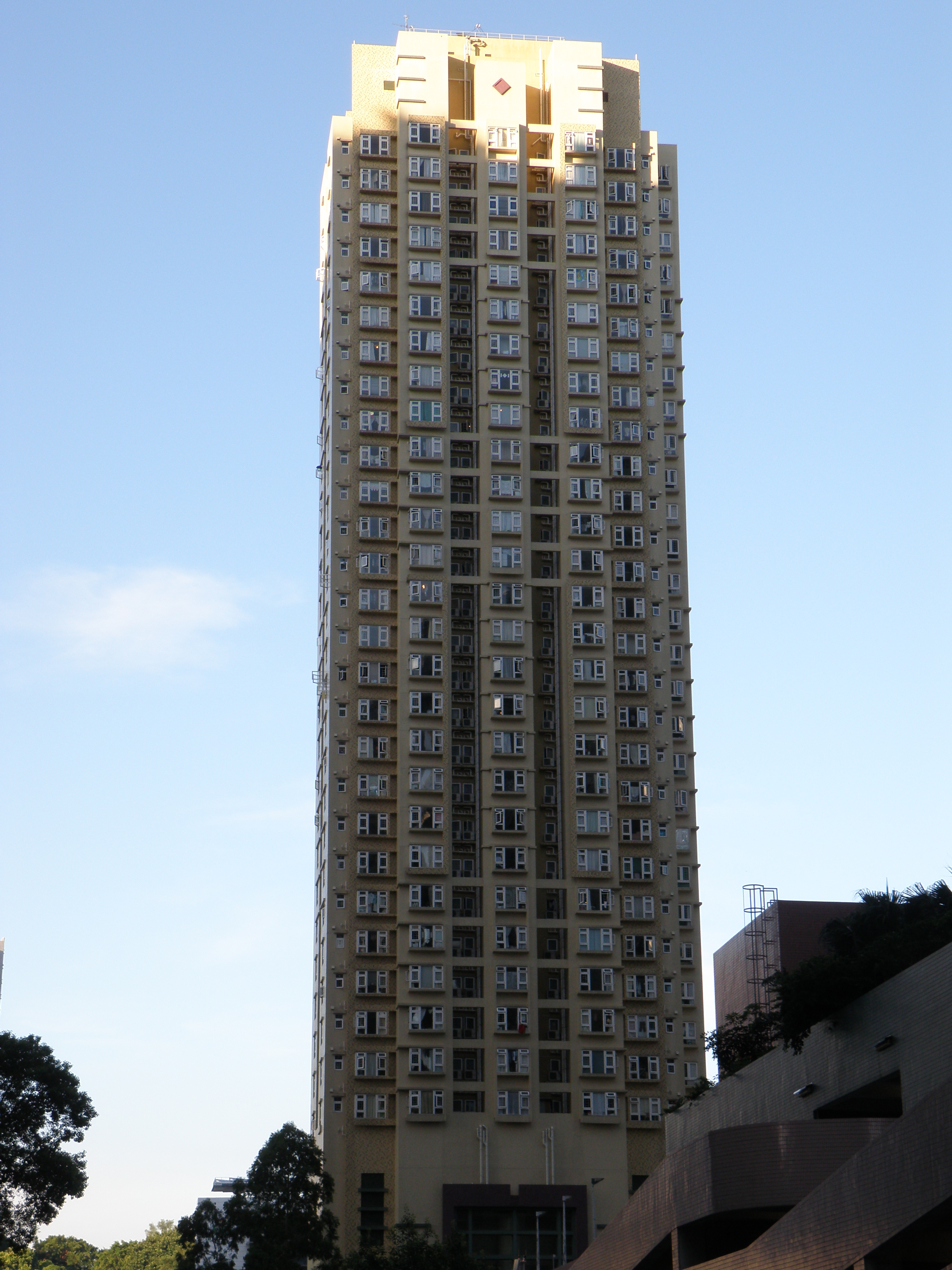
Jolly Place

Jolly Place (traditional Chinese: 樂頤居; simplified Chinese: 乐颐居) is a Senior Citizen Residence Scheme court in Hang Hau, Tseung Kwan O, near Hang Hau station. It is one of this kind of elderly housing in Hong Kong, developed by the Hong Kong Housing Society. It offers middle-class elder citizen to enjoy lifelong residence by paying an amount of rent in lump sum or by instalments.

=== Kin Ming Estate ===
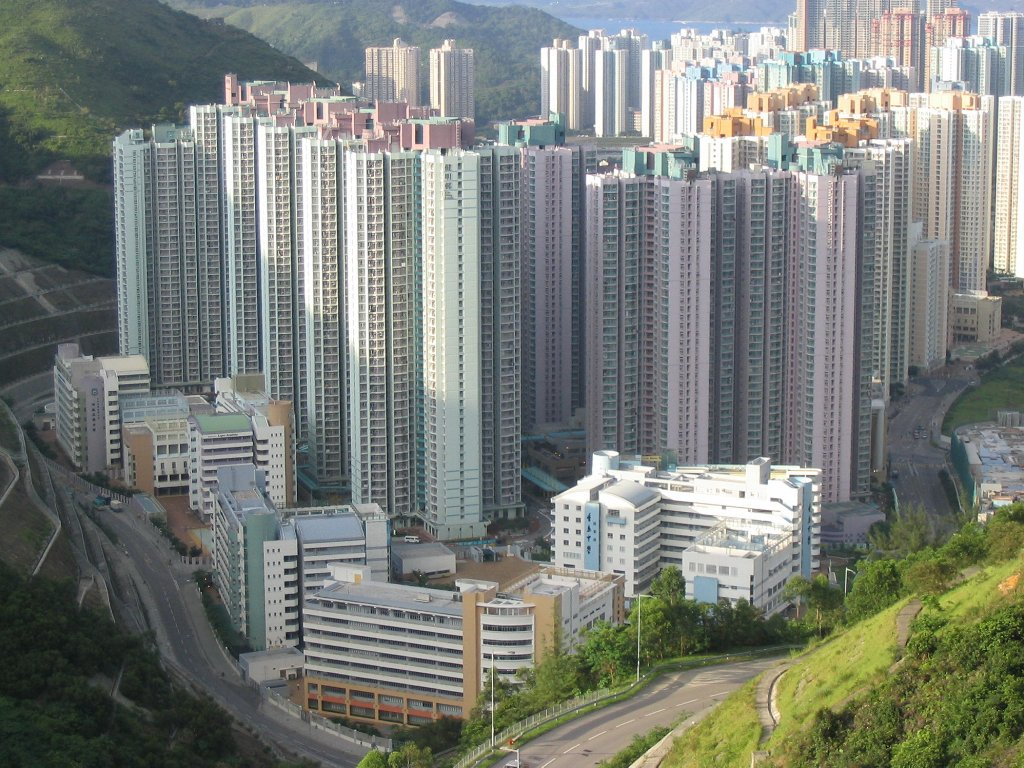
Kin Ming Estate

Kin Ming Estate (Chinese: 健明邨) is the eighth public housing estate, and consists of 10 housing blocks completed in 2003.

Kin Ming Estate was formerly the site of Tiu Keng Leng Cottage Area, an area settled by Kuomintang Army in Hong Kong after Chinese Civil War ended in 1949. After the area was demolished in 1997, a massive clearance, reclamation and redevelopment programme was carried out. The Tiu Keng Leng slope was flattened into two huge platforms to construct Kin Ming Estate and Choi Ming Court on the reclaimed land afterwards.

Kin Ming Estate was originally an HOS court called Kin Ming Court (健明苑), but it was changed to rental housing finally and renamed to the current name.

Name	Building type	Completed
Kin Ching House	New Harmony 1 Option 7	2003
Kin Wa House	New Harmony 1 Option 7	2003
Kin Hei House	New Harmony 1 Option 7	2003
Kin Fai House	New Harmony Annex Type 5	2003
Ming Yuet House	New Harmony Annex Type 5	2003
Ming Chau House	New Harmony 1 Option 5	2003
Ming Sing House	New Harmony 1 Option 5	2003
Ming Wik House	New Harmony 1 Option 5	2003
Ming Yu House	New Harmony 1 Option 5	2003
Ming Yat House	New Harmony 1 Option 7	2003

=== King Lam Estate ===
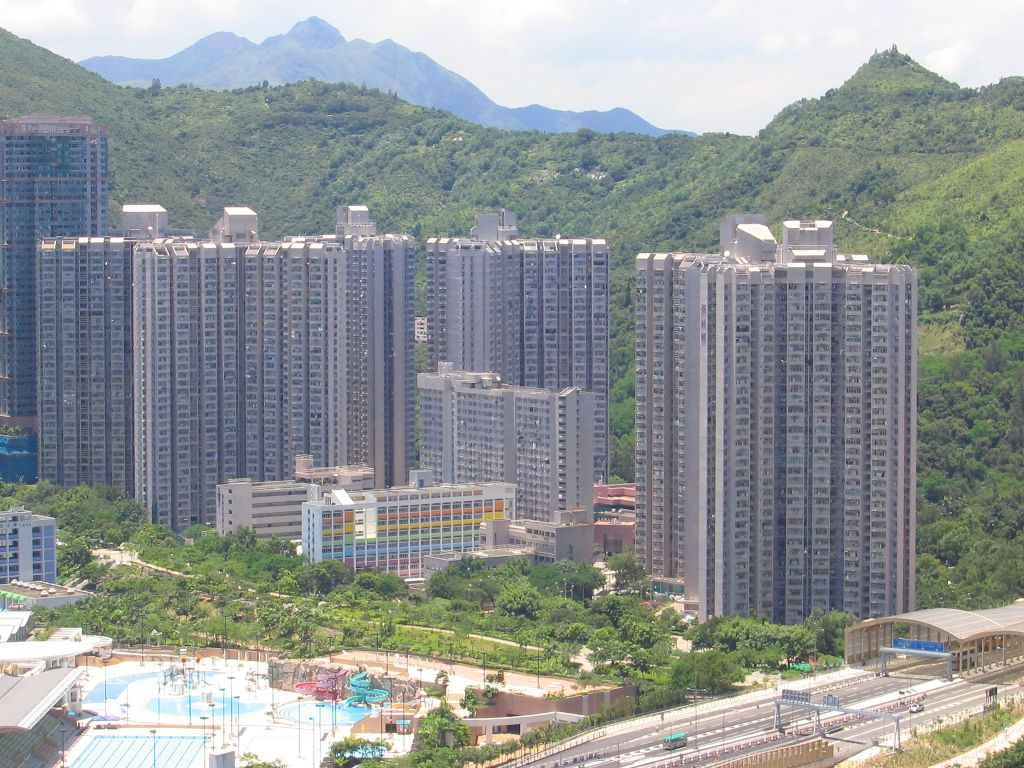
King Lam Estate

King Lam Estate (Chinese: 景林邨) is a TPS estate, and the third public housing estate. The estate has a total of 7 blocks of residential towers built in 1990. Some of the flats were sold to tenants through Tenants Purchase Scheme Phase 4 in 2001.

Name	Type	Completion
King Lui House	New Slab	1990
King Chung House	New Slab	1990
King Min House	Trident 3 (Early Gen. )	1990
King Tao House	Trident 3 (Late Gen.)	1990
King Yu House	Trident 3 (Late Gen.)	1990
King Nam House	Trident 4 (Early Gen.)	1990
King Yung House	Trident 4 (Late Gen.)	1990

=== King Ming Court ===
King Ming Court (Chinese: 景明苑) is a HOS estate, near Tsui Lam Estate. It is only HOS estate built at a hill, but not on the reclaimed land. It has 3 blocks built in 1988.

Name	Type	Completion
Hei King House	New Cruciform (Ver.1984)	1988
Fai King House	New Cruciform (Ver.1984)	1988
Yuk King House	New Cruciform (Ver.1984)	1988

=== Kwong Ming Court ===
Kwong Ming Court (Chinese: 廣明苑) is a HOS estate, near Sheung Tak Estate. It has 7 blocks built in 1998.

Name	Type	Completion
Kwong Cheong House	Harmony 1 Option 7 (3 Gen.)	1998
Kwong Lung House	Harmony 1 Option 7 (3 Gen.)	1998
Kwong Yin House	Harmony 1 Option 7 (3 Gen.)	1998
Kwong Sui House	Harmony 1 Option 7 (3 Gen.)	1998
Kwong Ying House	Harmony 1 Option 7 (3 Gen.)	1998
Kwong Ning House	Harmony 1 Option 7 (3 Gen.)	1998
Kwong Sun House	Harmony 1 Option 7 (3 Gen.)	1998

=== Mount Verdant ===
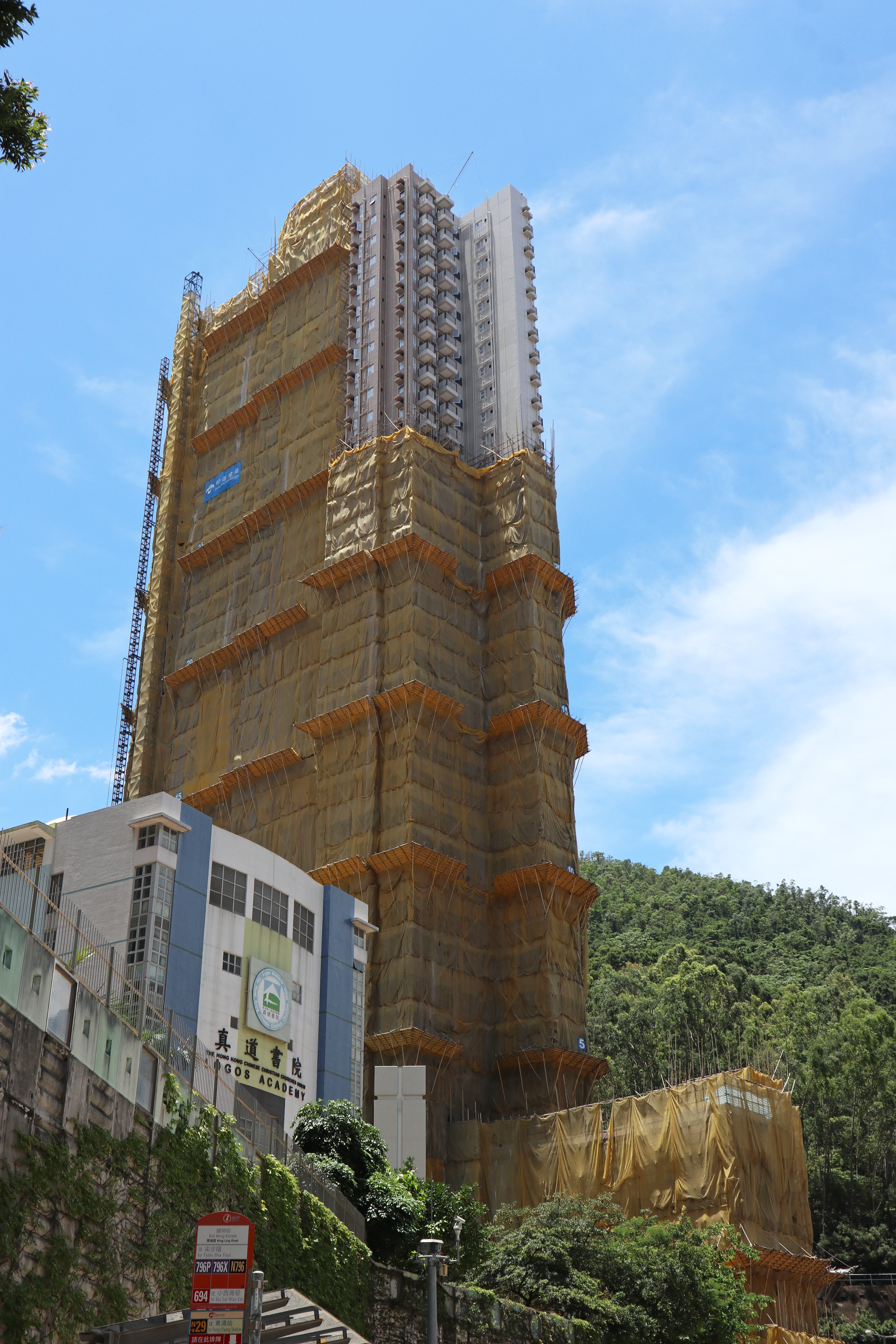
Mount Verdant

Mount Verdant (Chinese: 翠嶺峰) is a court under the Subsidized Sale Flats Project developed by Hong Kong Housing Society in Chui Ling Road, Tiu King Leng, Tseung Kwan O, near Kin Ming Estate. It comprises single 38-storey tower with total 330 units ranging from 271 to 684 square feet.

The court was sold together with another court, Terrace Concerto in Tuen Mun, in 2017, at prices between HK$2.19 million and HK$6.23 million, or about 30 percent less than market prices. It is expected to complete in 2021.

Name	Type	Completion
Mount Verdant	Designed by architect	2021

=== Ming Tak Estate ===
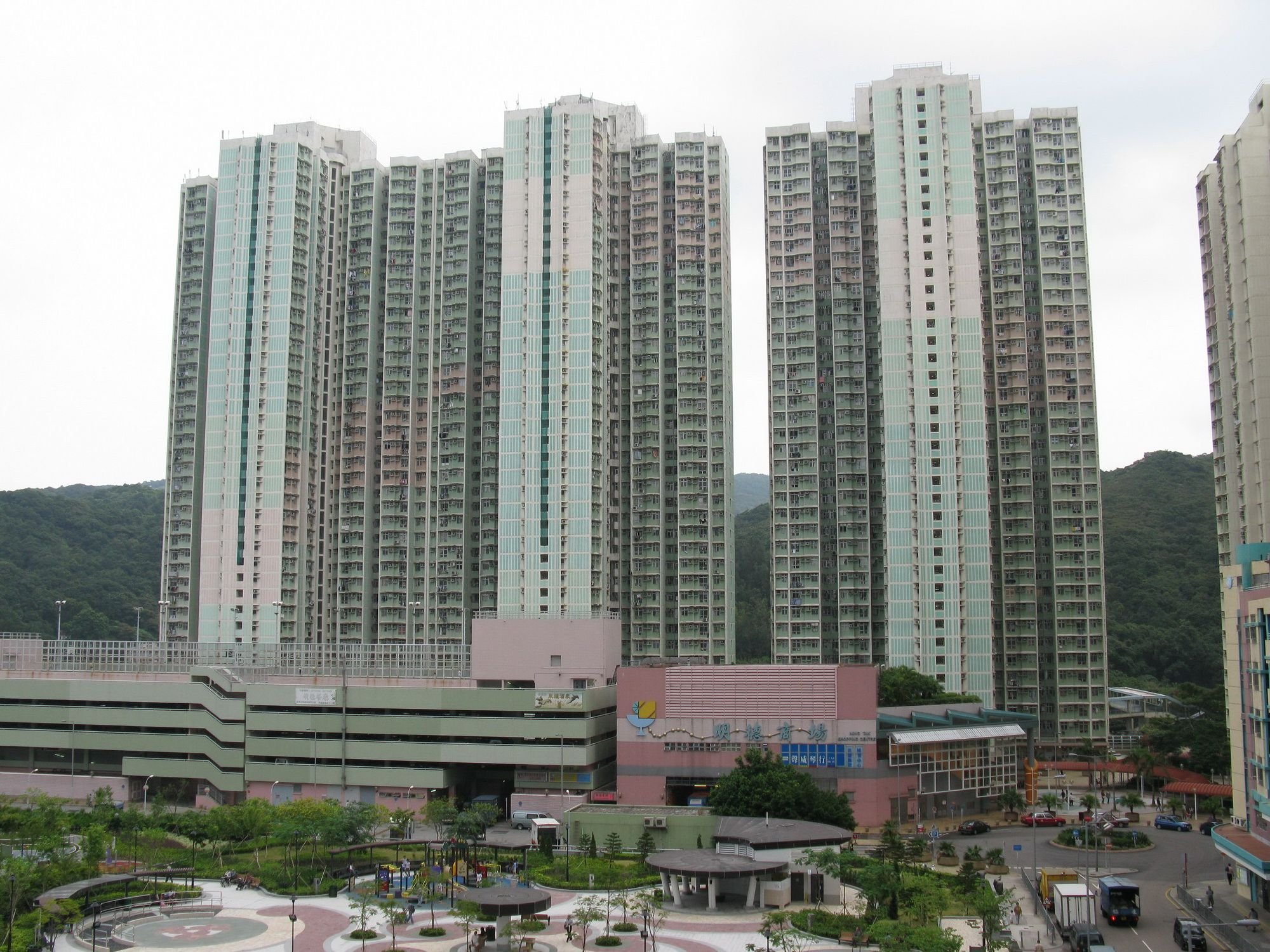
Ming Tak Estate and Hin Ming Court

Ming Tak Estate (Chinese: 明德邨) is the fifth public housing estate. Built in 1996, the estate comprises 2 blocks of Harmony I style.

Name	Type	Completion
Ming Kok House	Harmony 1 Option 6 (2 Gen.)	1996
Ming Toa House	Harmony 1 Option 6 (2 Gen.)	1996

=== On Ning Garden ===
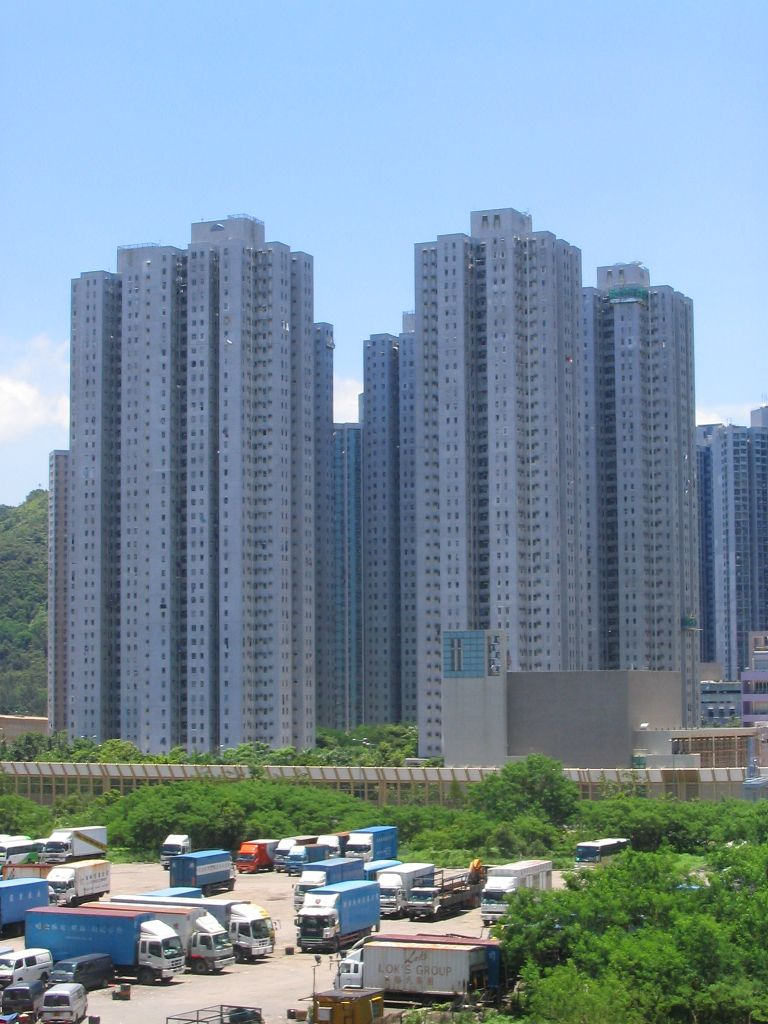
On Ning Garden

On Ning Garden (Chinese: 安寧花園) is a HOS and PSPS estate, located near Hang Hau station. It was jointly developed by Hong Kong Housing Authority and Hening Investment. It consists of 6 residential blocks built on the reclaimed land and completed in 1991. In the 1990s, it suffered serious unusual ground settlement when Tseung Kwan O line was being constructed.

Name	Type	Completion
Block 1	Private Sector Participation Scheme	1991
Block 2	Private Sector Participation Scheme	1991
Block 3	Private Sector Participation Scheme	1991
Block 4	Private Sector Participation Scheme	1991
Block 5	Private Sector Participation Scheme	1991
Block 6	Private Sector Participation Scheme	1991

=== Po Lam Estate ===
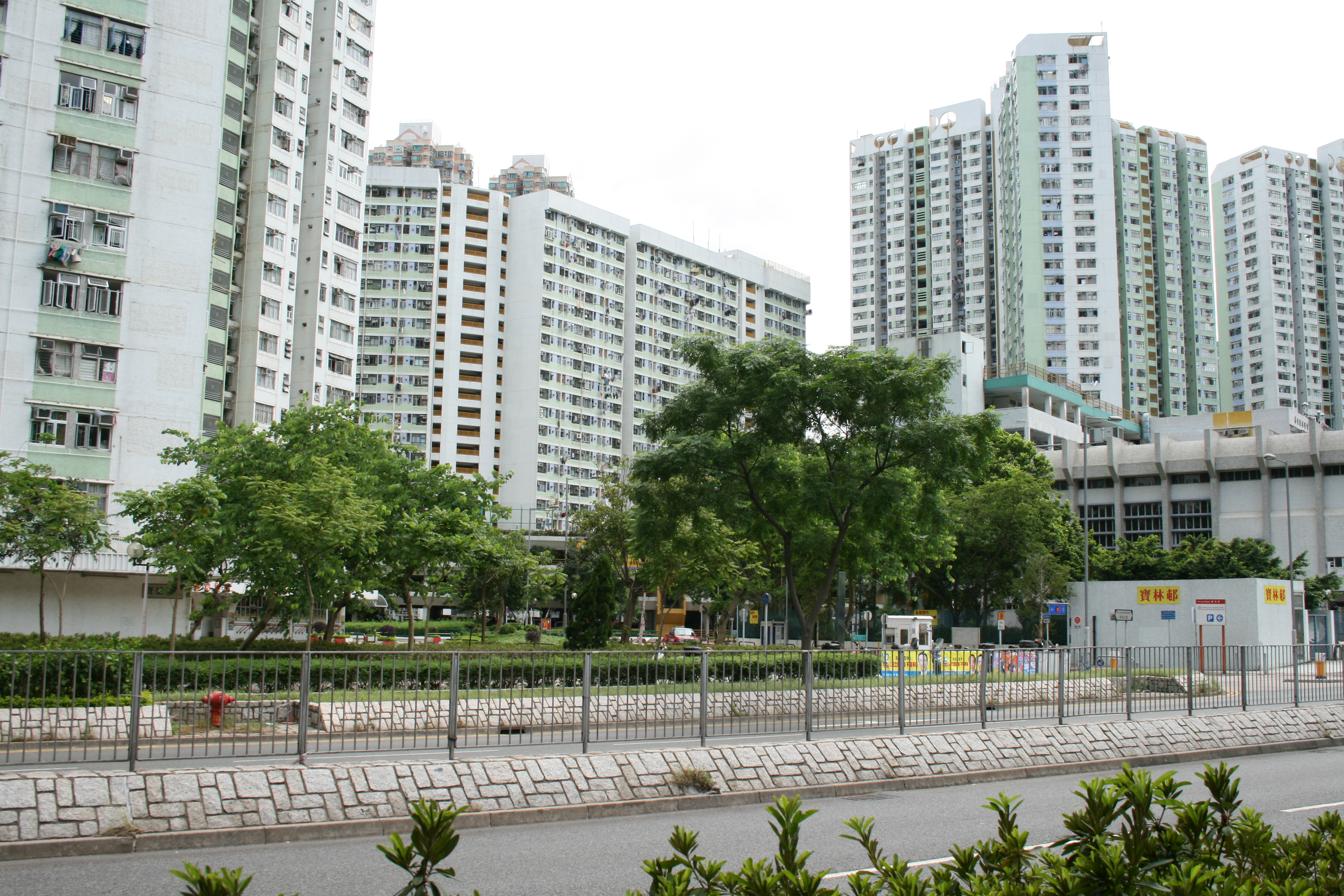
Po Lam Estate

Po Lam Estate (Chinese: 寶林邨) is a TPS estate and the first public housing estate. The estate has a total of 7 blocks of residential towers with 5,272 units. In 2004, some of the flats (Po Kim House excluded) were sold to tenants through Tenants Purchase Scheme Phase 6A.

Name	Type	Completion
Po Ning House	New Slab	1988
Po Kan House	New Slab	1988
Po Yan House	Trident 2	1988
Po Tai House	Trident 2	1988
Po Tak House	Trident 2	1988
Po Chi House	Trident 2	1988
Po Kim House	Small Household Block	2001

=== Po Ming Court ===
Po Ming Court (Chinese: 寶明苑) is a HOS estate, near Sheung Tak Estate. It has 2 blocks built in 1998.

Name	Type	Completion
Po Chung House	Harmony 1 Option 5 (3 Gen.)	1998
Po Pak House	Harmony 1 Option 5 (3 Gen.)	1998

=== Sheung Tak Estate ===
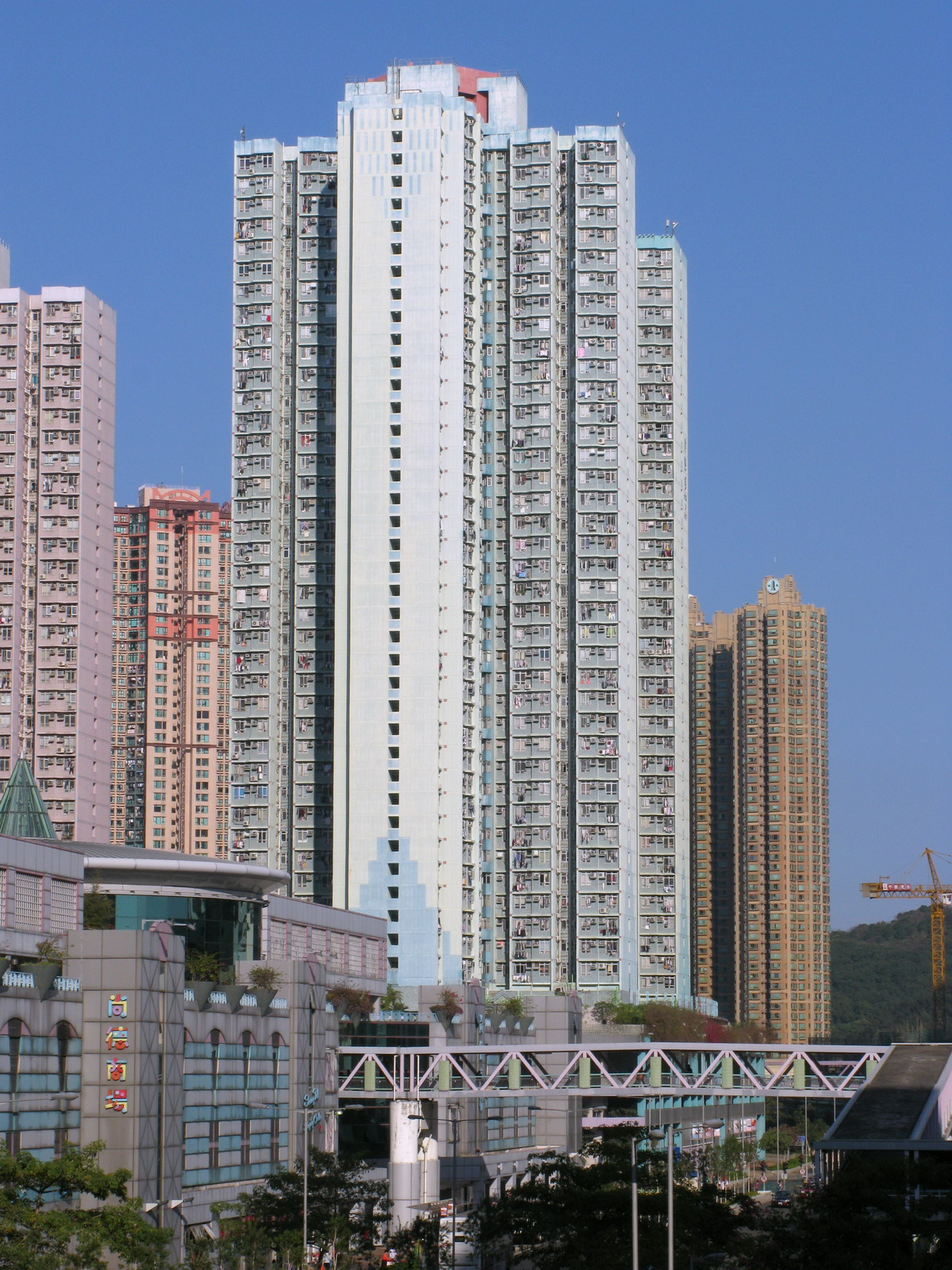
Sheung Tak Estate

Sheung Tak Estate (Chinese: 尚德邨) is the sixth public housing estate. Built in 1998 and 2003 respectively, the estate comprises 9 blocks of Harmony I and Small Household Block styles, and a shopping centre.

Name	Type	Completion
Sheung Nim House	Hsc	1998
Sheung Chun House	Harmony 1 Option 5 (3 Gen.)	1998
Sheung Yan House	Harmony 1 Option 5 (3 Gen.)	1998
Sheung Yee House	Harmony 1 Option 5 with New Harmony Annex 2 (3 Gen.)	1998
Sheung Chi House	Harmony 1 Option 10 (3 Gen.)	1998
Sheung Ming House	Harmony 1 Option 10 (3 Gen.)	1998
Sheung Shun House	Harmony 1 Option 10 (3 Gen.)	1998
Sheung Lai House	Harmony 1 Option 10 (3 Gen.)	1998
Sheung Mei House	Small Household Block	2002

=== Shin Ming Estate ===
Shin Ming Estate comprises two blocks housing 2,000 flats. It is designed to accommodate 4,200 people and opened in 2011.

Name	Chinese name	Type	Completion
Shin Chi House	善智樓	Non-Standard block (Cross-shaped)	2011
Shin Lai House	善禮樓	Non-Standard Block (Cross-shaped) with Annex Block	2011

=== The Pinnacle ===
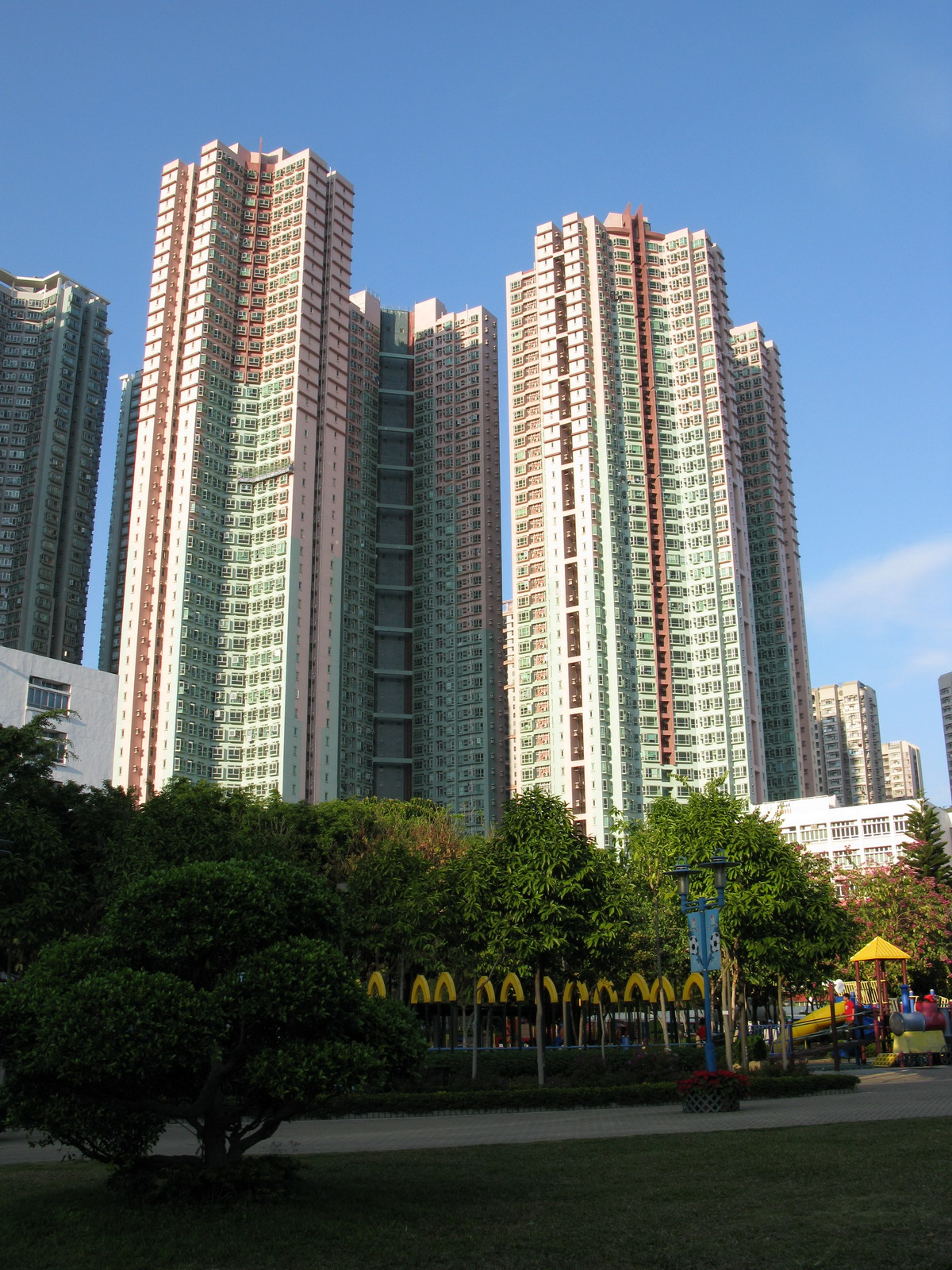
The Pinnacle

The Pinnacle (Chinese: 疊翠軒) is a Sandwich Class Housing Scheme estate, near Po Lam station. It was developed by the Hong Kong Housing Society in 1999. It has 4 blocks in total. Not all units were sold before the subsidized-sale scheme was stopped, but the government released the rest of the units in 2010. The Pinnacle has been plagued with complaints of shoddy construction from the beginning, as well as from new homeowners who bought remaining apartments in 2010, believing the earlier issues were fixed.

=== Tong Ming Court ===
Tong Ming Court (Chinese: 唐明苑) is a HOS estate, near Sheung Tak Estate. It has 3 blocks built in 1999.

Name	Type	Completion
Tong Fai House	Harmony 1 Option 7 (3.5 Gen.)	1999
Tong Wong House	Harmony 1 Option 7 (3.5 Gen.)	1999
Tong Fu House	Harmony 1 Option 7 (3.5 Gen.)	1999

=== Tsui Lam Estate ===
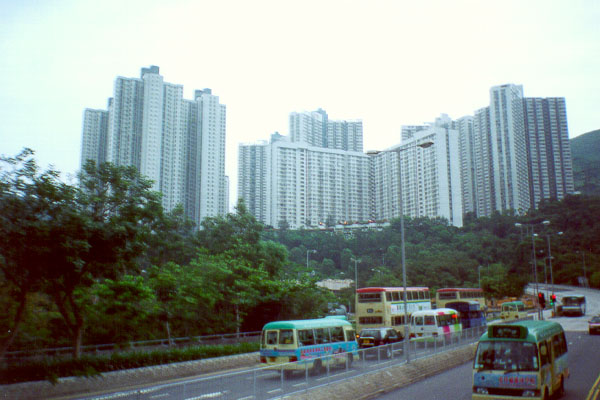
Tsui Lam Estate

Tsui Lam Estate (Chinese: 翠林邨) is a TPS estate to the west of Po Lam. It consists of 8 residential buildings completed in 1988. It is the second public housing estate, and it is the only public housing estate which was not built on the reclaimed land. In 2005, some of the flats were sold to tenants through Tenants Purchase Scheme Phase 6B. There are some basic facilities, such as a sports centre, a shopping mall, two kindergarten schools, several playgrounds, colleges, elderly services and a clinic. The population is largely elderly. Since Tsui Lam Estate is located at the middle of the mountain and near the forest, the air temperature is usually about 2 °C to 3 °C lower than the city.

==== Transit ====
There is a steep slope near the main road for residents to walk directly from Tsui Lam to Po Lam. It takes 10 minutes to walk there. There are also public buses 296M, 93A, 98C and minibus 17M for residents' commuting.

==== Animals found in Tsui Lam Estate ====
As the estate is near a forest, birds and insects are easily found. In summer, mosquitoes appear frequently and parents need to protect the kids in the playground. Once, a wild monkey and a wild boar were discovered and the government services took them away and released them in the forest. No damages or injuries occurred.

Name	Type	Completion
Choi Lam House	New Slab	1988
Fai Lam House	New Slab	1988
Nga Lam House	New Slab	1988
Yan Lam House	New Slab	1988
Pik Lam House	Trident 2	1988
Sau Lam House	Trident 2	1988
Hong Lam House	Trident 2	1988
On Lam House	Trident 2	1988

=== Verbena Heights ===
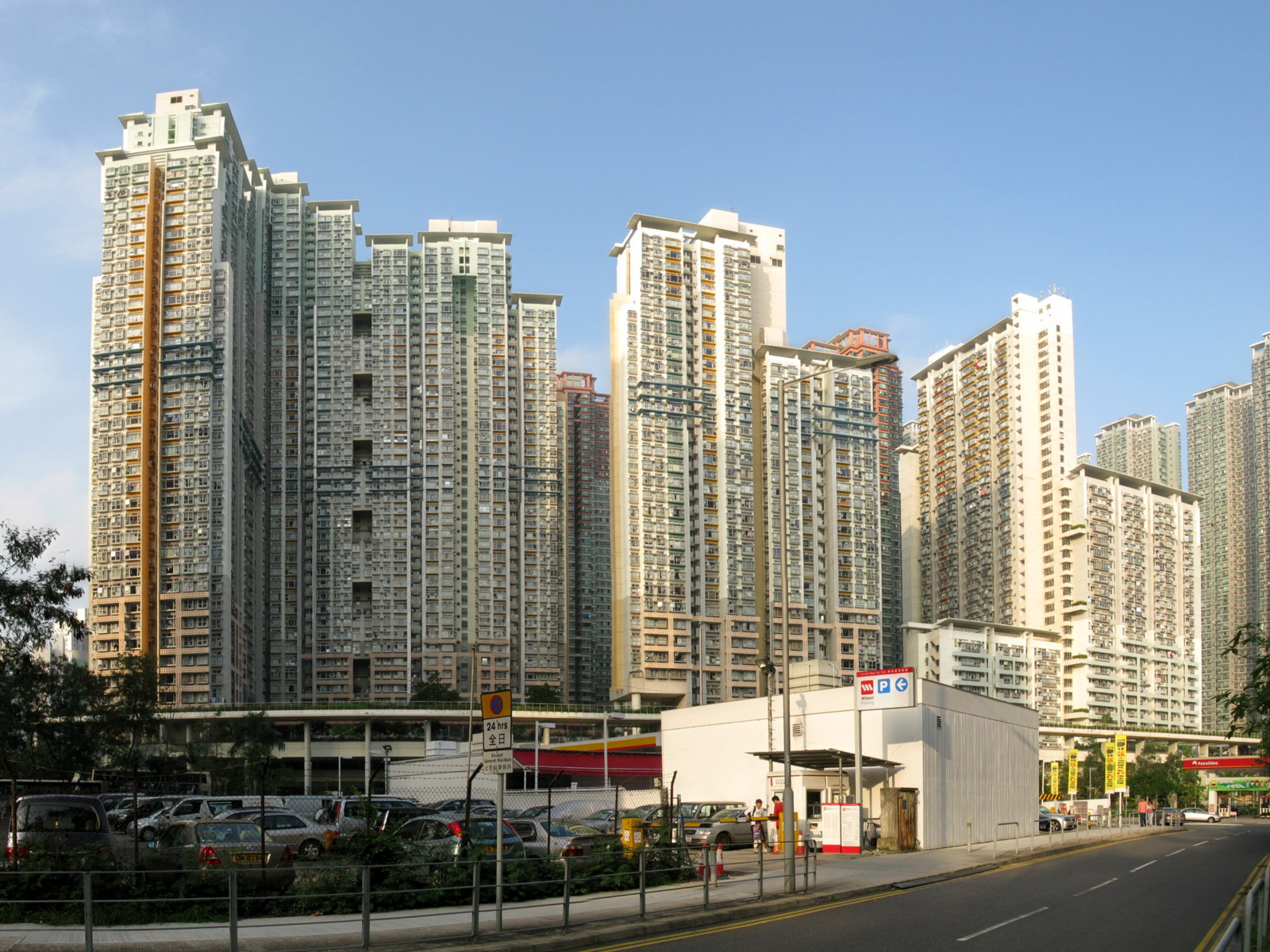
Verbena Heights

Verbena Heights (Chinese: 茵怡花園) is a public housing estate on the reclaimed land in Po Lam, Tseung Kwan O, Hong Kong, located near Po Lam station. It was developed by the Hong Kong Housing Society in 1996 and 1997. It consists of 7 residential blocks with a total of 1894 saleable units and 971 rental units. It is an attempt to design environmentally-responsible housing. It received a Silver Medal at the 1998 Hong Kong Institute of Architects Annual Awards.

=== Wo Ming Court ===
Wo Ming Court (Chinese: 和明苑) is a HOS estate, near Ming Tak Estate. It has 4 blocks built in 1999.

Name	Type	Completion
Wo Yat House	Harmony 1 Option 7 (3.5 Gen.)	1999
Wo Fai House	Harmony 1 Option 7 (3.5 Gen.)	1999
Wo Cheong House	Concord 2 Option 2	1999
Wo Hui House	Concord 2 Option 2	1999

=== Yan Ming Court ===
Yan Ming Court (Chinese: 欣明苑) is a HOS estate, near Po Lam Estate, Ying Ming Court, Po Lam station and Metro City. It has 5 blocks built in 1990.

Name	Type	Completion
Yan Chung House	New Cruciform (Ver.1984)	1990
Yan Chuk House	New Cruciform (Ver.1984)	1990
Yan Mui House	New Cruciform (Ver.1984)	1990
Yan Lan House	New Cruciform (Ver.1984)	1990
Yan Kuk House	New Cruciform (Ver.1984)	1990

=== Yee Ming Estate ===
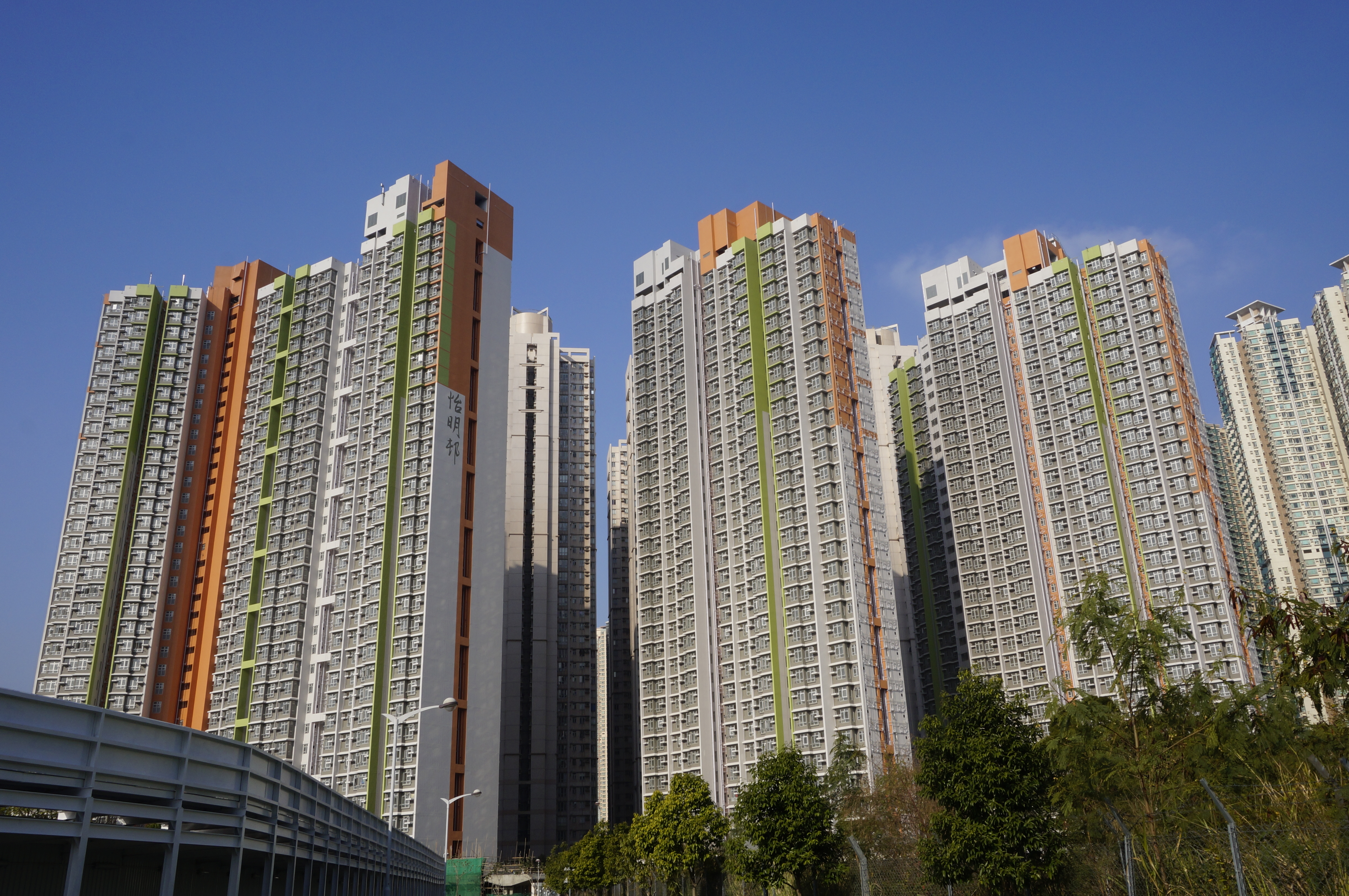
Yee Ming Estate

Yee Ming Estate (Chinese: 怡明邨) is a public rental estate in Tsueng Kwan O town centre. It consists of three residential blocks comprising 2,059 flats. The towers are 32-33 storeys in height and will accommodate a projected population of about 5,700.

English name	Chinese name	Type	Storeys	Completion
Yee Yan House	怡茵樓	Non-Standard Block (Y-shaped)	-	2014
Yee Yuet House	怡悅樓	Non-Standard Block (Z-shaped)	-	2014
Yee Ching House	怡情樓	Non-Standard Block (Z-shaped)	-	2014

=== Ying Ming Court ===
Ying Ming Court (Chinese: 英明苑) is a HOS estate, near Po Lam Estate, Yan Ming Court, Po Lam station and Metro City. It has 5 blocks built in 1989.

Name	Type	Completion
Ming Yuen House	New Cruciform (Ver.1984)	1989
Ming Leung House	New Cruciform (Ver.1984)	1989
Ming Tat House	New Cruciform (Ver.1984)	1989
Ming Chi House	New Cruciform (Ver.1984)	1989
Ming On House	New Cruciform (Ver.1984)	1989

=== Yu Ming Court ===
Yu Ming Court (Chinese: 裕明苑) is a HOS estate, near Hau Tak Estate. It has only 2 blocks built in 1994.

Name	Type	Completion
Yu Wing House	Harmony 1 Option 4 (1 Gen.)	1994
Yu Cheong House	Harmony 1 Option 4 (1 Gen.)	1994

=== Yuk Ming Court ===
Yuk Ming Court (Chinese: 煜明苑) is a HOS estate, near Ming Tak Estate. It has only 3 blocks built in 1996.

Name	Type	Completion
Wai Ming House	Harmony 2 Option 7 (2 Gen.)	1996
Kwan Ming House	Harmony 2 Option 7 (2 Gen.)	1996
Hei Ming House	Harmony 2 Option 7 (2 Gen.)	1996

=== Yung Ming Court ===
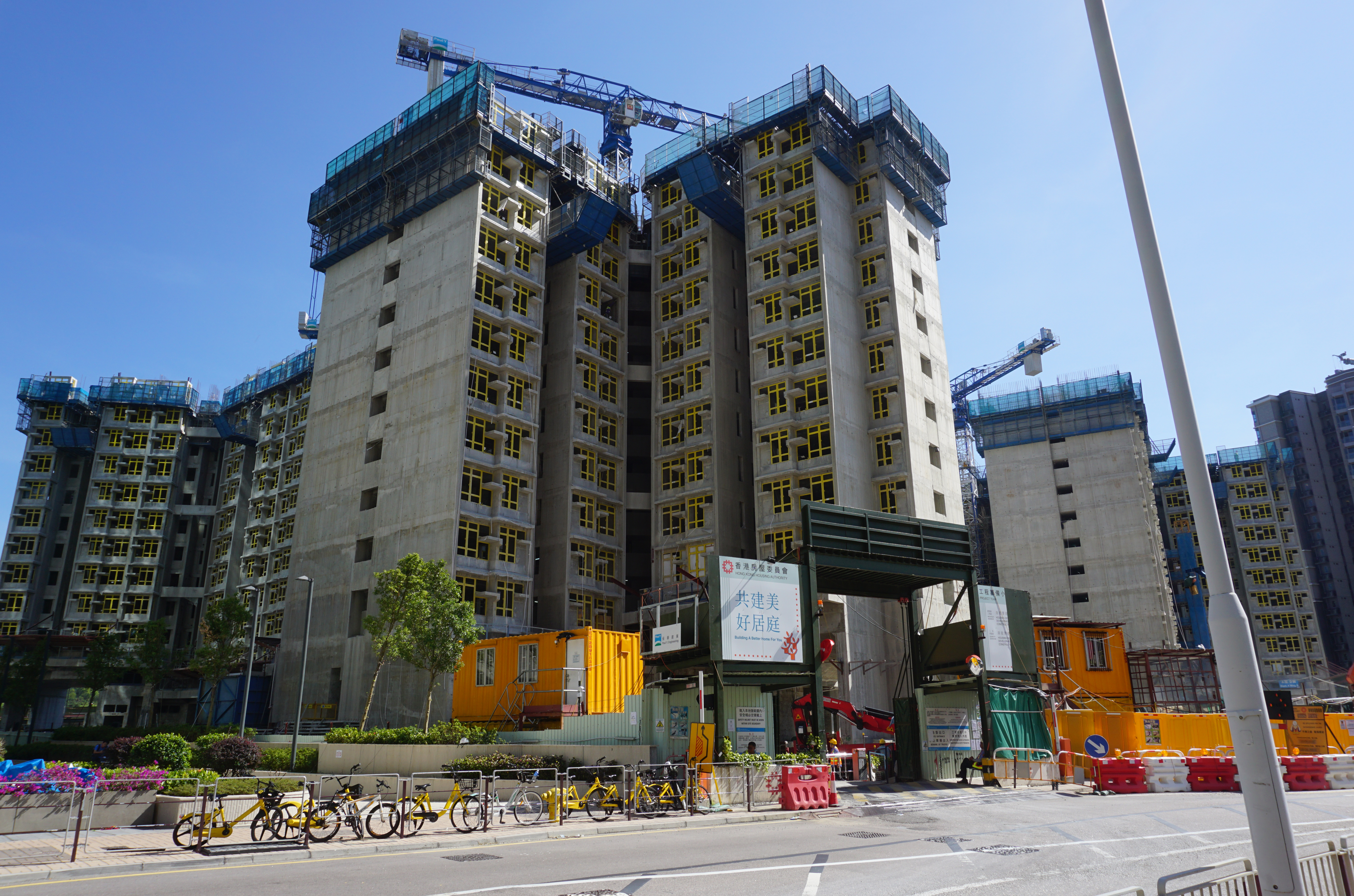
Yung Ming Court

Yung Ming Court (Chinese: 雍明苑) is a Home Ownership Scheme court in Chi Shin Street, Tseung Kwan O along Tseung Kwan O Eastern Channel, near Yee Ming Estate and Savannah, with a few walking distance to MTR Tseung Kwan O station. It comprises 2 blocks with 1,395 flats in total, which was the largest number of units among the six HOS courts (other five are Kwun Tak Court, Hoi Tak Court, Sheung Man Court, Kam Fai Court, Yuk Wo Court) sold in 2019 - with four sizes between 282 and 568 square feet. It is expected to complete in 2020.

Name	Type	Completion
Chak Ming House (Block A)	Non-Standard Block (Cross, slab shaped)	2020
Yun Ming House (Block B)	Non-Standard Block (Cross, slab shaped) with Y-Shaped Annex	2020
