= Fu Nam (constituency) =

Constituency of the Sai Kung District Council of Hong Kong

- Elected constituency for the Sai Kung District Council
- Boundary of Fu Nam in Sai Kung District
- District: Sai Kung
- Legislative Council constituency: New Territories South East
- Population: 16,981 (2019)
- Electorate: 11,083 (2019)

Current constituency
- Created: 1999
- Number of members: One
- Member: Andrew Chan Yiu-chor (CGPLTKO)

Fu Nam (Chinese: 富藍), formerly called Fu Yu is one of the 29 constituencies in the Sai Kung District.

The constituency returns one district councillor to the Sai Kung District Council, with an election every four years.

Fu Nam constituency is loosely based on Fu Ning Garden, Residence Oasis and Yu Ming Court in Tseung Kwan O with estimated population of 16,981.

== Councillors represented ==
Election	Member	Party
1999	Chan Kwok-kai	DAB
2015	Chan Pok-chi	DAB
2019	Andrew Chan Yiu-chor→vacant	CGPLTKO

== Election results ==
=== 2010s ===
Sai Kung District Council Election, 2019: Fu Nam
Party	Candidate	Votes	%	±%
Ind. democrat	Andrew Chan Yiu-chor	4,743	56.81	
DAB	Chan Pok-chi	3,606	43.19	
Majority		1,137	13.62	
Turnout		8,388	75.70	
Ind. democrat gain from DAB		Swing		
