= Hau Tak Estate =

Public housing estate in Tseung Kwan O, Hong Kong

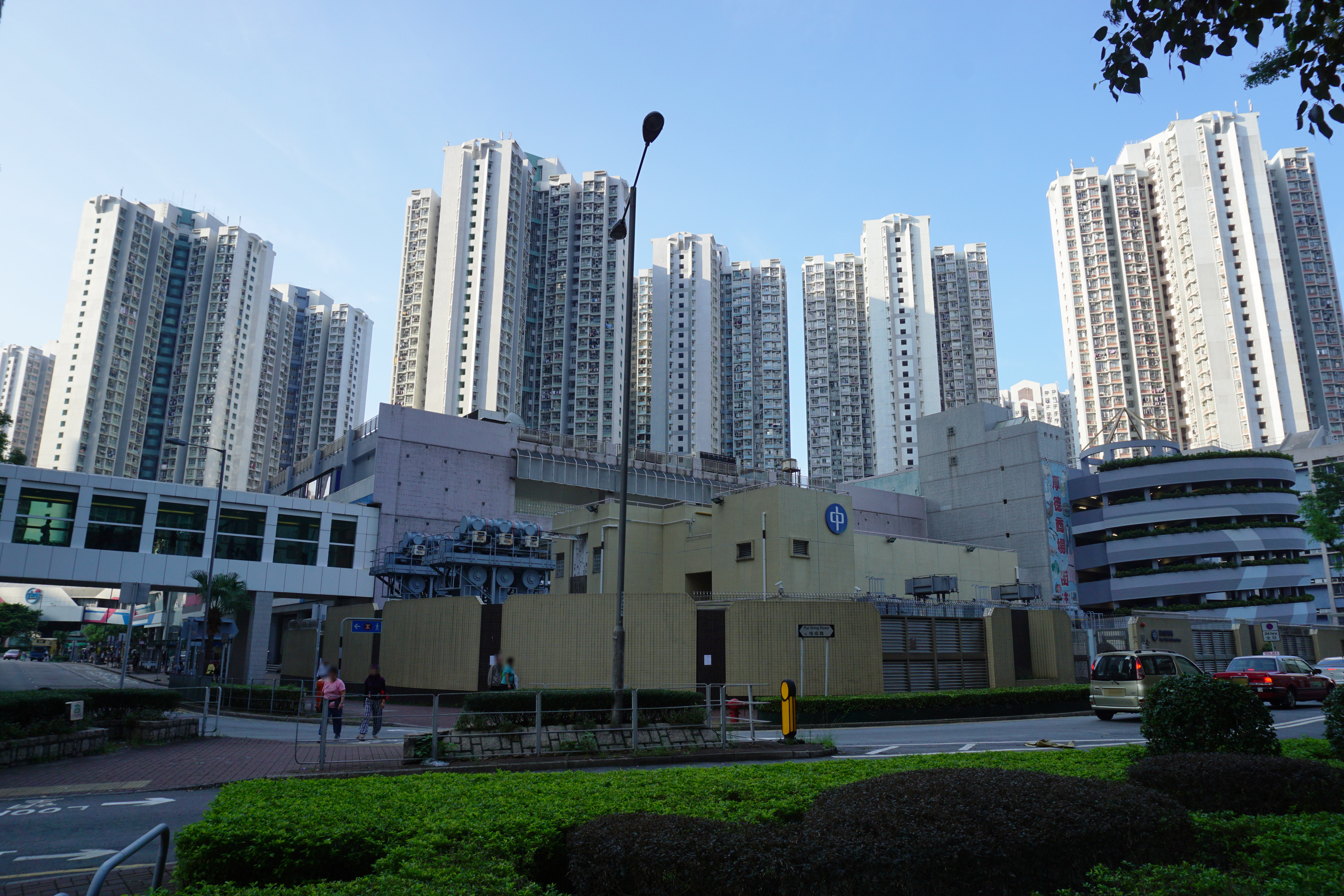
- Hau Tak Estate
- Interactive map of Hau Tak Estate

General information
- Location: 2 Sheung Ning Road, Hang Hau; Tseung Kwan O New Territories, Hong Kong
- Coordinates: 22.31868°N 114.26463°E
- Status: Completed
- Category: Public rental housing
- Population: 12,806 (2016)
- No. of blocks: 6
- No. of units: 4,271

Construction
- Constructed: 1993; 33 years ago
- Authority: Hong Kong Housing Authority

Hau Tak Estate (Chinese: 厚德邨) is a public housing estate in Hang Hau, Tseung Kwan O, New Territories, Hong Kong, near East Point City. It is the fourth public housing estate in Tseung Kwan O and consists of six blocks of Harmony I style, providing more than 4,000 rental flats built between 1993 and 1994.

Chung Ming Court (頌明苑) and Yu Ming Court (裕明苑) are Home Ownership Scheme housing courts in Tseung Kwan O near Hau Tak Estate, built in 1993 and 1994, respectively.

== Houses ==
=== Hau Tak Estate ===
Name	Chinese name	Building type	Completed
Tak Chak House	德澤樓	Harmony 1 Option 2 (1 Gen.) with Harmony Annex Type 1	1993
Tak Chi House	德志樓	Harmony 1 Option 2 (1 Gen.)	1993
Tak Fu House	德富樓	Harmony 1 Option 2 (1 Gen.)	1993
Tak Hong House	德康樓	Harmony 1 Option 2 (1 Gen.)	1993
Tak On House	德安樓	Harmony 1 Option 2 (1 Gen.)	1994
Tak Yue House	德裕樓	Harmony 1 Option 2 (1 Gen.)	1994

=== Chung Ming Court ===
Name	Chinese name	Building type	Completed
Kar Ming House	嘉明閣	New Cruciform (Ver.1984)	1993
Fai Ming House	輝明閣	New Cruciform (Ver.1984)	1993
Yin Ming House	賢明閣	New Cruciform (Ver.1984)	1993
Tsui Ming House	翠明閣	New Cruciform (Ver.1984)	1993
Koon Ming House	冠明閣	New Cruciform (Ver.1984)	1993

=== Yu Ming Court ===
Name	Chinese name	Building type	Completed
Yu Wing House	裕榮閣	Harmony 1 Option 4 (1 Gen.)	1994
Yu Cheong House	裕昌閣	Harmony 1 Option 4 (1 Gen.)	1994

== Demographics ==
According to the 2016 by-census, Hau Tak Estate had a population of 12,806, Chung Ming Court had a population of 4,894 while Yu Ming Court had a population of 3,555. Altogether the population amounts to 21,255.

== Politics ==
For the 2019 District Council election, the estate fell within two constituencies. Hau Tak Estate and Chung Ming Court fall within the Hau Tak constituency, which is currently represented by Wong Cheuk-nga, while Yu Ming Court falls within the Fu Nam constituency, which is currently represented by Andrew Chan Yiu-chor.

== See also ==
- Public housing estates in Tseung Kwan O
