= Hau Tak (constituency) =

Constituency of the Sai Kung District Council of Hong Kong

- Elected constituency for the Sai Kung District Council
- Boundary of Hau Tak in Sai Kung District
- District: Sai Kung
- Legislative Council constituency: New Territories South East
- Population: 17,762 (2019)
- Electorate: 12,254 (2019)

Current constituency
- Created: 1999
- Number of members: One
- Member: vacant

Hau Tak (Chinese: 厚德) is one of the 29 constituencies in the Sai Kung District.

The constituency returns one district councillor to the Sai Kung District Council, with an election every four years.

Hau Tak constituency is loosely based on Chung Ming Court and Hau Tak Estate in Tseung Kwan O with estimated population of 17,762.

== Councillors represented ==
Election	Member	Party
1994	Ling Man-hoi	Progressive Alliance
2005	Ling Man-hoi	DAB
2019	Wong Cheuk-nga→Vacant	Independent democrat

== Election results ==
=== 2010s ===
Sai Kung District Council Election, 2019: Hau Tak
Party	Candidate	Votes	%	±%
Ind. democrat	Wong Cheuk-nga	5,244	59.44	
DAB	Ruby Mok	3,579	40.56	
Majority		1,665	18.88	
Turnout		8,858	72.32	
Ind. democrat gain from DAB		Swing		
