= Fu Ning Garden =

Public housing estate in Tseung Kwan O, Hong Kong

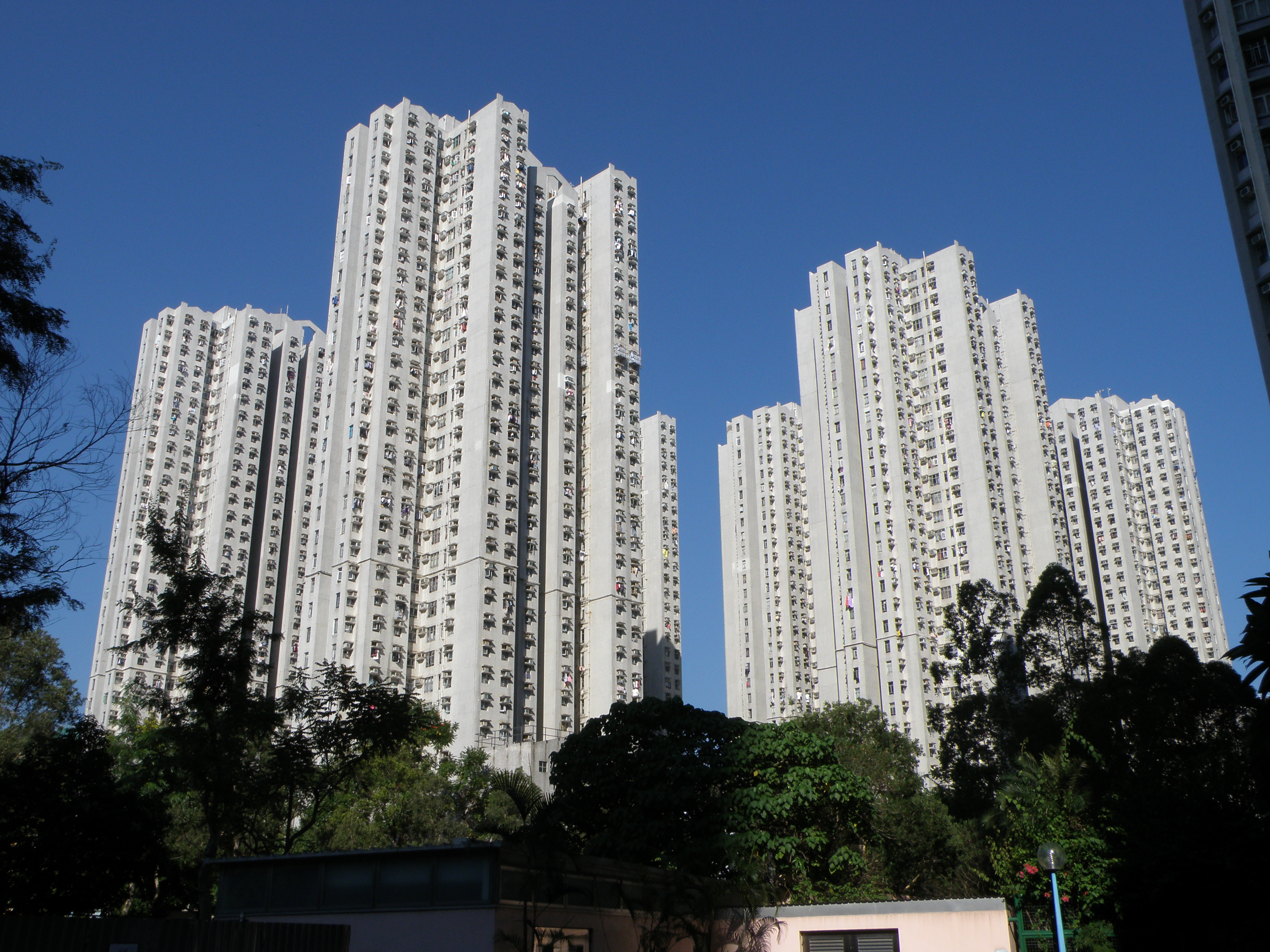
- Fu Ning Garden
- Interactive map of Fu Ning Garden

General information
- Location: 25 Po Ning Road, Hang Hau; Tseung Kwan O New Territories, Hong Kong
- Coordinates: 22.319669°N 114.267458°E
- Status: Completed
- Category: Public rental housing
- Population: 6,934 (2016)
- No. of blocks: 6
- No. of units: 2,450

Construction
- Constructed: 1990; 36 years ago
- Contractors: Tak Wing Investment (Holdings) Limited
- Authority: Hong Kong Housing Authority

Fu Ning Garden (Chinese: 富寧花園) is a Home Ownership Scheme and Private Sector Participation Scheme court in Hang Hau, Tseung Kwan O, New Territories, Hong Kong near Hang Hau Village and Tseung Kwan O Hospital. It was jointly developed by the Hong Kong Housing Authority and Tak Wing Investment (Holdings) Limited (Renamed as New Smart Energy Group Limited), and has a total of six blocks built on reclaimed land and was completed in 1990.

== Houses ==
Name	Chinese name	Building type	Completed
Block 1	第1座	Private Sector Participation Scheme	1990
Block 2	第2座	Private Sector Participation Scheme	1990
Block 3	第3座	Private Sector Participation Scheme	1990
Block 4	第4座	Private Sector Participation Scheme	1990
Block 5	第5座	Private Sector Participation Scheme	1990
Block 6	第6座	Private Sector Participation Scheme	1990

== Demographics ==
According to the 2016 by-census, Fu Ning Garden had a population of 6,934. The median age was 50 and the majority of residents (97.2 per cent) were of Chinese ethnicity. The average household size was 3 people. The median monthly household income of all households (i.e. including both economically active and inactive households) was HK$33,000.

== Politics ==
Fu Ning Garden is located in Fu Nam constituency of the Sai Kung District Council. It is currently represented by Andrew Chan Yiu-chor, who was elected in the 2019 elections.

== See also ==
- Public housing estates in Tseung Kwan O
