= Nam On (constituency) =

Constituency of the Sai Kung District Council of Hong Kong

- Elected constituency for the Sai Kung District Council
- Boundary of Nam On in Sai Kung District
- District: Sai Kung
- Legislative Council constituency: New Territories South East
- Population: 18,364 (2019)
- Electorate: 10,661 (2019)

Current constituency
- Created: 2007
- Number of members: One
- Member: Francis Chau Yin-ming (Independent)

Nam On (Chinese: 南安) is one of the 29 constituencies in the Sai Kung District.

The constituency returns one district councillor to the Sai Kung District Council, with an election every four years.

Nam On constituency is loosely based on East Point City, Nan Fung Plaza and On Ning Garden in Tseung Kwan O with estimated population of 18,364.

== Councillors represented ==
Election	Member	Party
2007	Francis Chau Yin-ming	Independent democrat

== Election results ==
=== 2010s ===
Sai Kung District Council Election, 2019: Nam On
Party	Candidate	Votes	%	±%
Independent	Francis Chau Yin-ming	5,524	67.92	
FTU	Chen Yuting	2,609	32.08	
Majority		2,915	35.84	
Turnout		8,180	76.75	
Independent hold		Swing		
