= On Ning Garden =

Public housing estate in Tseung Kwan O, Hong Kong

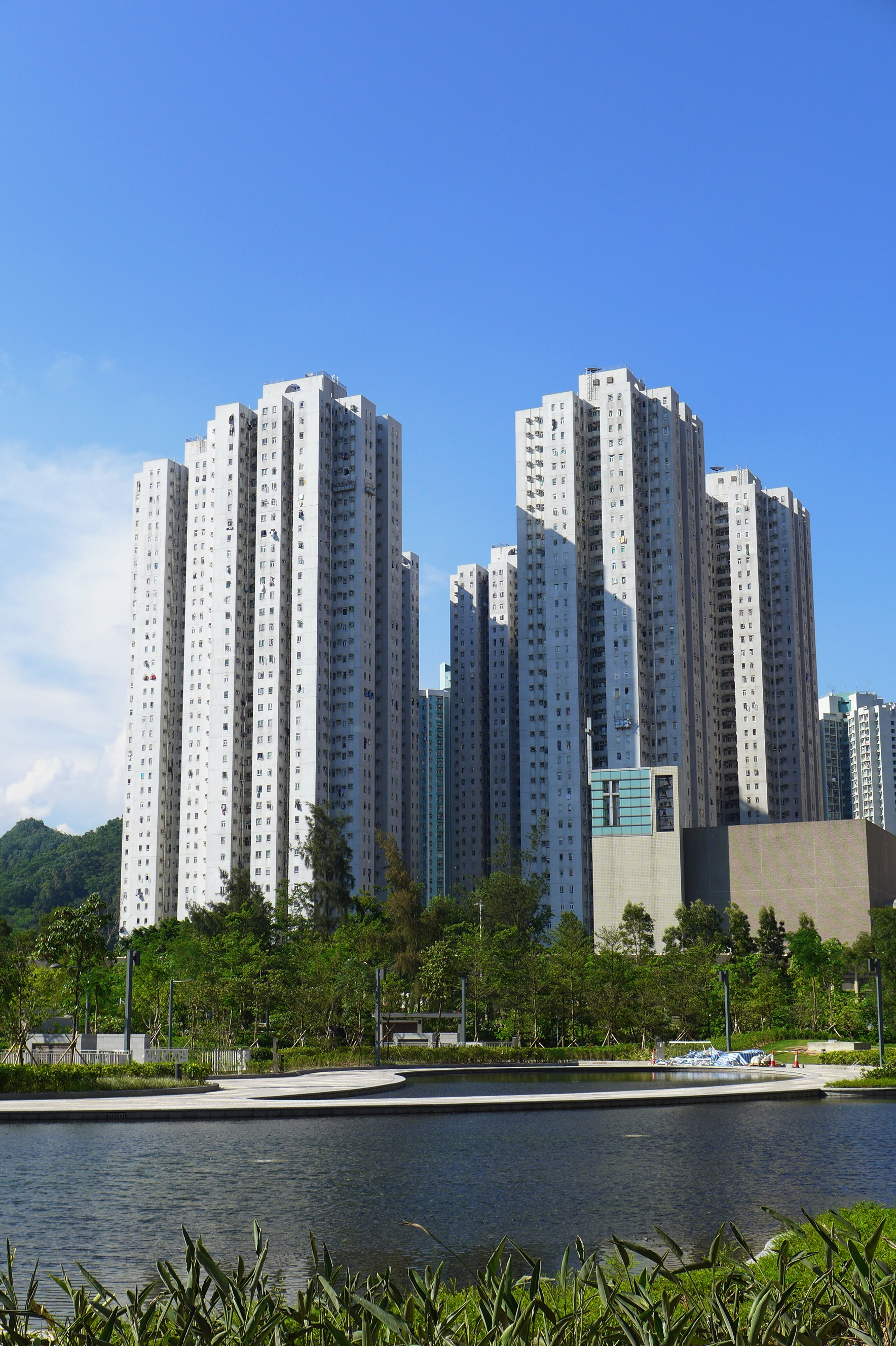
- On Ning Garden
- Interactive map of On Ning Garden

General information
- Location: 10 Sheung Ning Road, Hang Hau; Tseung Kwan O New Territories, Hong Kong
- Coordinates: 22.31601°N 114.26295°E
- Status: Completed
- Category: Public rental housing
- Population: 6,921 (2016)
- No. of blocks: 6
- No. of units: 2,300

Construction
- Constructed: 1991; 35 years ago
- Contractors: Hening Investment
- Authority: Hong Kong Housing Authority

On Ning Garden (Chinese: 安寧花園) is a Home Ownership Scheme and Private Sector Participation Scheme court in Hang Hau, Tseung Kwan O, New Territories, Hong Kong near MTR Hang Hau station. It was jointly developed by the Hong Kong Housing Authority and Hening Investment, and has a total of six blocks built on reclaimed land and was completed in 1991.

== Houses ==
Name	Chinese name	Building type	Completed
Block 1	第1座	Private Sector Participation Scheme	1991
Block 2	第2座	Private Sector Participation Scheme	1991
Block 3	第3座	Private Sector Participation Scheme	1991
Block 4	第4座	Private Sector Participation Scheme	1991
Block 5	第5座	Private Sector Participation Scheme	1991
Block 6	第6座	Private Sector Participation Scheme	1991

== Demographics ==
According to the 2016 by-census, On Ning Garden had a population of 6,921. The median age was 49.2 and the majority of residents (96.7 per cent) were of Chinese ethnicity. The average household size was 3.2 people. The median monthly household income of all households (i.e. including both economically active and inactive households) was HK$41,900.

== Politics ==
On Ning Garden is located in Nam On constituency of the Sai Kung District Council. It was formerly represented by Francis Chau Yin-ming, who was elected in the 2019 elections.

== Covid Pandemic ==
Block 5 was sealed off on 25 February, 2022.

== See also ==
- Public housing estates in Tseung Kwan O
