= Fu Kwan (constituency) =

Constituency of the Sai Kung District Council of Hong Kong

- Elected constituency for the Sai Kung District Council
- Boundary of Fu Kwan in Sai Kung District
- District: Sai Kung
- Legislative Council constituency: New Territories South East
- Population: 18,975 (2019)
- Electorate: 11,245 (2019)

Current constituency
- Created: 2003
- Number of members: One
- Member: vacant

Fu Kwan (Chinese: 富君) is one of the 29 constituencies in the Sai Kung District.

The constituency returns one district councillor to the Sai Kung District Council, with an election every four years.

Fu Kwan constituency is loosely based on Beverly Garden, The Grandiose and The Wings in Tseung Kwan O with an estimated population of 18,975.

== Councillors represented ==
Election	Member	Party
2003	Luk Ping-choi→Vacant	CGPLTKO

== Election results ==
=== 2010s ===
Sai Kung District Council Election, 2019: Fu Kwan
Party	Candidate	Votes	%	±%
Ind. democrat	Luk Ping-choi	4,948	61.31	
FTU	Wong Yuen-hong	3,123	38.69	
Majority		1,825	22.62	
Turnout		8,099	72.05	
Ind. democrat hold		Swing		
