= Residence Oasis =

Housing estate in Tseung Kwan O, New Territories

Coordinates: 22.3159°N 114.2646°E

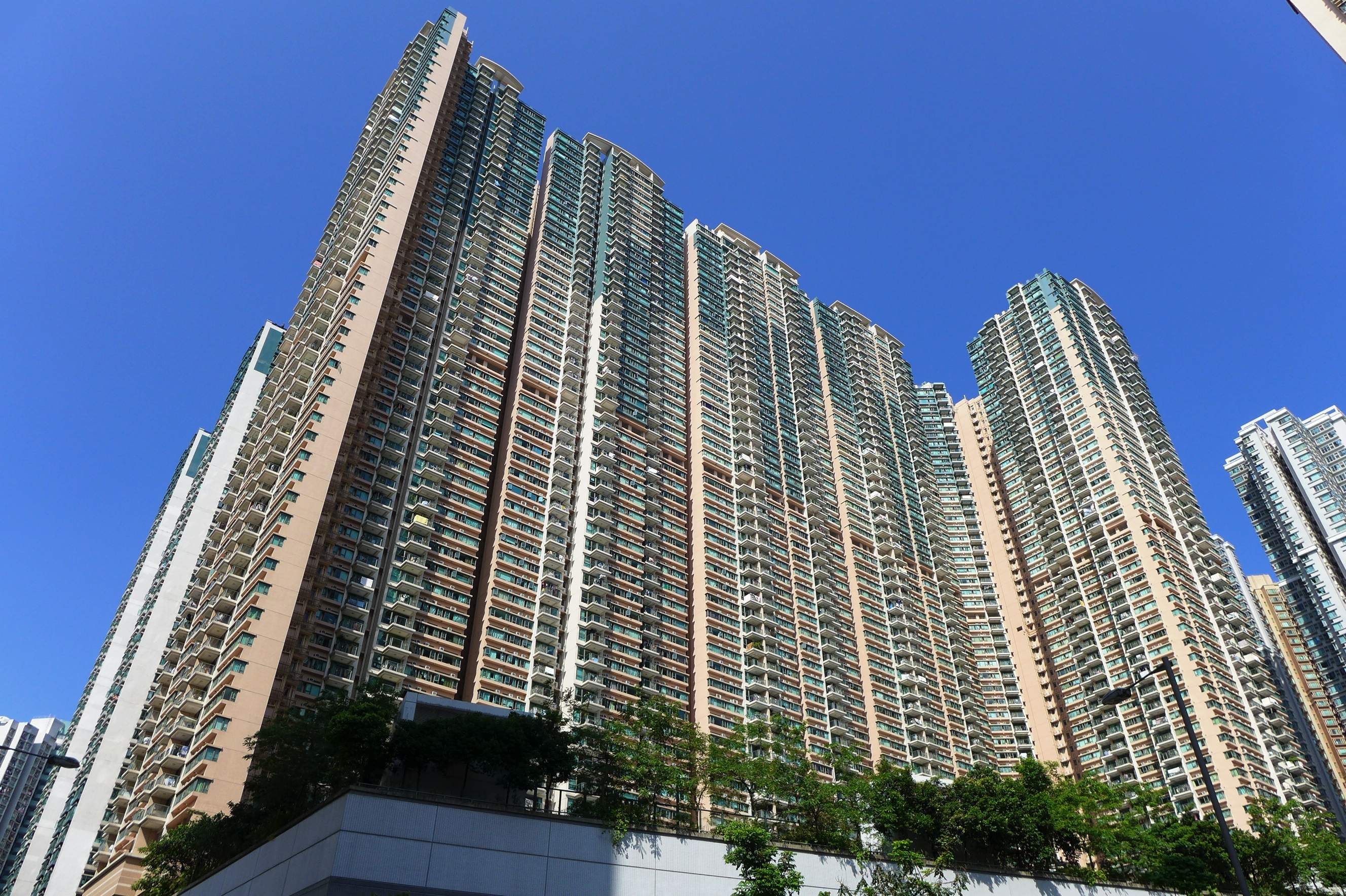
Residence Oasis

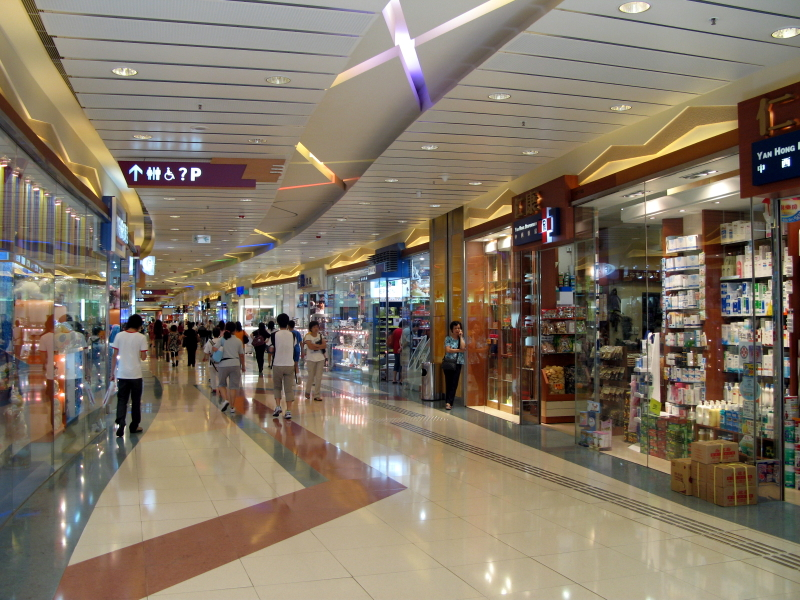
The Lane Shopping Arcade

Residence Oasis (Chinese: 蔚藍灣畔) is a private housing estate on the reclaimed land of Hang Hau, Tseung Kwan O, New Territories, Hong Kong, located near MTR Hang Hau station. It was jointly developed by MTR Corporation, Sino Land and Kerry Properties in 2005. It consists of six high-rise buildings (Tower 1-3, 5-7) and a shopping arcade, The Lane (Chinese: 連理街).

== Demographics ==
According to the 2016 by-census, Residence Oasis had a population of 5,870. The median age was 39.8 and the majority of residents (92.6 per cent) were of Chinese ethnicity. The average household size was 3 people. The median monthly household income of all households (i.e. including both economically active and inactive households) was HK$61,750.

== Politics ==
Residence Oasis is located in Fu Nam constituency of the Sai Kung District Council. It is currently represented by Andrew Chan Yiu-chor, who was elected in the 2019 elections.
