= Concern Group for Tseung Kwan O People's Livelihood =

Concern Group for Tseung Kwan O People's Livelihood 將軍澳民生關注組
- Convenor: Vacant
- Founded: 2000
- Ideology: Liberalism (Hong Kong)
- Regional affiliation: Pro-democracy camp
- Colours: Orange
- Legislative Council: 0 / 90
- Sai Kung District Council: 0 / 32

Website
- Official Facebook page

Concern Group for Tseung Kwan O People's Livelihood (Chinese: 將軍澳民生關注組; CGPLTKO) is a district-based pro-democracy political group centred in Tseung Kwan O by Sai Kung District Councillors in 2000.

== History ==
It was formed in 2000 by four pro-democracy Sai Kung District Councillors including the Democratic Party's Gary Fan catering to the livelihood issues in Tseung Kwan O.

After Neo Democrats led by Gary Fan split from the Democratic Party in 2010, the pro-democrats' infighting in the region emerged. Ahead of the 2015 District Council elections, Neo Democrats reported the Concern Group's Cyrus Chan Chin-chun and Luk Ping-choi to the Independent Commission Against Corruption (ICAC) for attempting to force a Neo Democrat Jacky Lai Ming-chak to withdraw from Kwan Po in the election.

The group contested in the 2019 District Council elections but failed to coordinate with other pro-democracy parties. All of the candidates including the two incumbents Tse Ching-fung and Luk Ping-choi who were seeking for re-election in Po Yee and Fu Kwan ran under the label of "democrat" instead of CGPLTKO, except for David Kan Sun-wah who ran in Wan Po South against incumbent Chris Cheung Mei-hung and another pro-democrat Ng Ho-kei. Kan failed to get elected but eight of the CGPLTKO members who ran as "democrats" got elected, making the group unofficially second largest grouping in the council behind Neo Democrats.

== Performance in elections ==
=== Sai Kung District Council elections ===
| Election | Number of popular votes | % of popular votes | Total elected seats | +/− |
|---|---|---|---|---|
| 2019 | 2,063 | 1.04 | 0 / 29 | 0 |
