= Hang Hau station =

MTR station in the New Territories, Hong Kong

Hang Hau 坑口
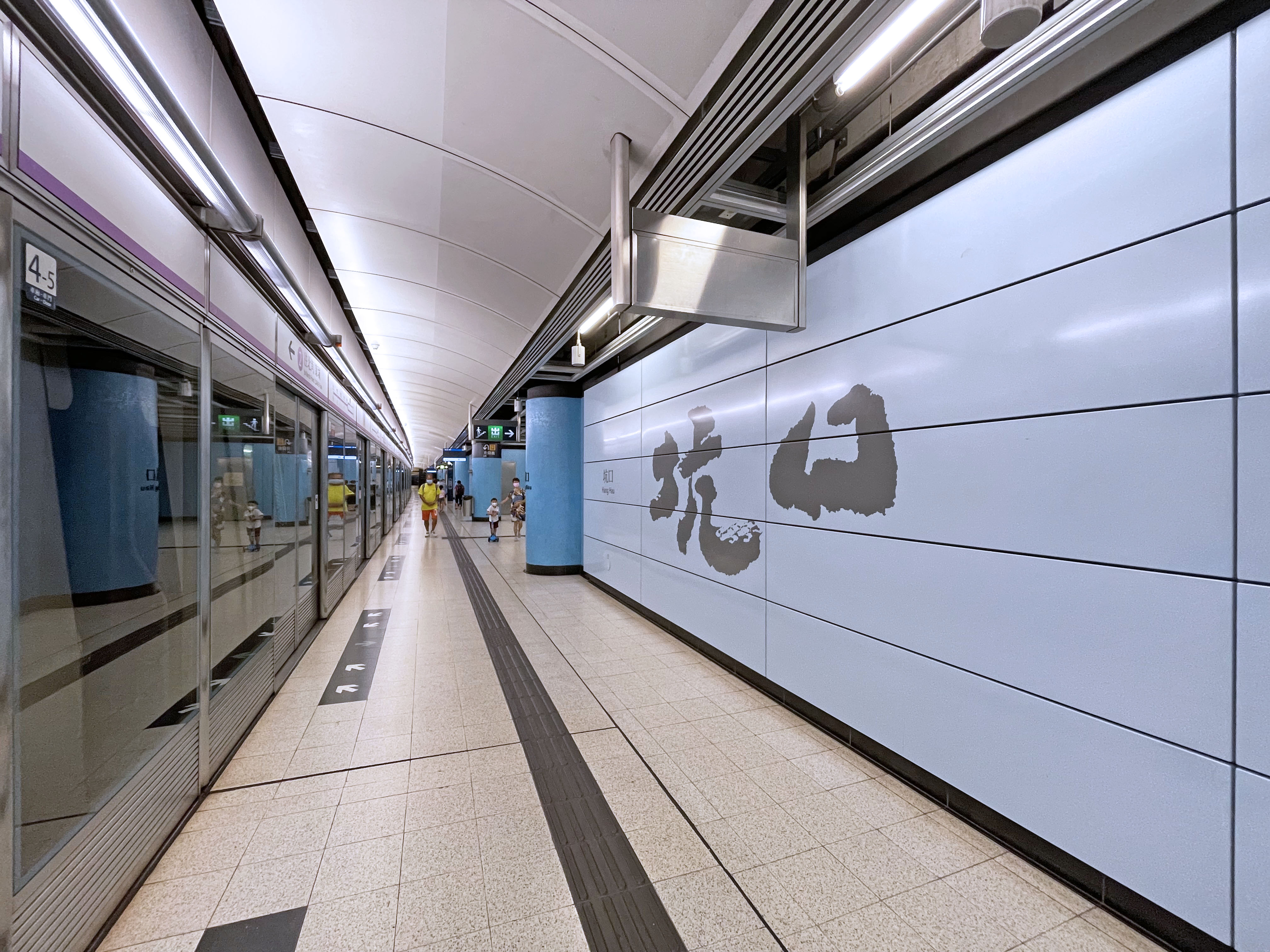
- Platform 2

Chinese name
- Traditional Chinese: 坑口
- Cantonese Yale: Hāangháu
- Literal meaning: Pit Mouth
Transcriptions
Standard Mandarin
- Hanyu Pinyin: Kēngkǒu
Yue: Cantonese
- Yale Romanization: Hāangháu
- IPA: [háːŋ.hɐ̌u̯]
- Jyutping: Haang1hau2

General information
- Location: Pui Shing Road, Hang Hau; Tseung Kwan O, Sai Kung District; Hong Kong
- Coordinates: 22°18′56″N 114°15′52″E
- System: MTR rapid transit station
- Owner: MTR Corporation
- Operator: MTR Corporation
- Line: Tseung Kwan O line
- Platforms: 2 (2 side platforms)
- Tracks: 2

Construction
- Structure type: Underground
- Platform levels: 1
- Accessible: Yes
- Architect: RMJM Hong Kong Ltd.

Other information
- Station code: HAH

History
- Opened: 18 August 2002; 24 years ago

Services
Preceding station	MTR	Following station
Tseung Kwan O towards North Point	Tseung Kwan O line	Po Lam Terminus
Track layout
Location
- Location within MTR

Hang Hau (Chinese: 坑口; Cantonese Yale: Hāangháu) is an MTR station of Tseung Kwan O line, located at Pui Shing Road, Hang Hau, Tseung Kwan O, in the New Territories of Hong Kong. It was the easternmost station in the MTR railway system, until LOHAS Park station opened on 26 July 2009. It was named after Hang Hau Village, which is about a 10-minute walk from the station. Residence Oasis, a private residential estate, and its accompanied shopping centre, the Lane, are situated above the station. The station's livery is baby blue.

== History ==
The HK$1.3-billion contract to construct the station was awarded to Dragages et Travaux Publics, the Hong Kong subsidiary of Bouygues, in 1999.

The station opened on 18 August 2002.

== Station layout ==
G	Concourse	Exits A and B, transport interchange
G	Concourse	Octopus card promotion machines
L1; Platforms	Side platform, doors will open on the left
L1; Platforms	Platform 1	Tseung Kwan O line towards Po Lam (Terminus) →
L1; Platforms	Platform 2	← Tseung Kwan O towards North Point (Tseung Kwan O)
L1; Platforms	Side platform, doors will open on the left

== Entrances/exits ==
There are two exits, A and B, at two ends of the station. Each exit is divided into two adjacent sub-exits.

- A1: Residence Oasis
- A2: On Ning Garden
- B1: The Lane
- B2: Tseung Kwan O Sports Ground (Note: Exit B2 was called Hang Hau Station Public Transport Interchange before 2015.)
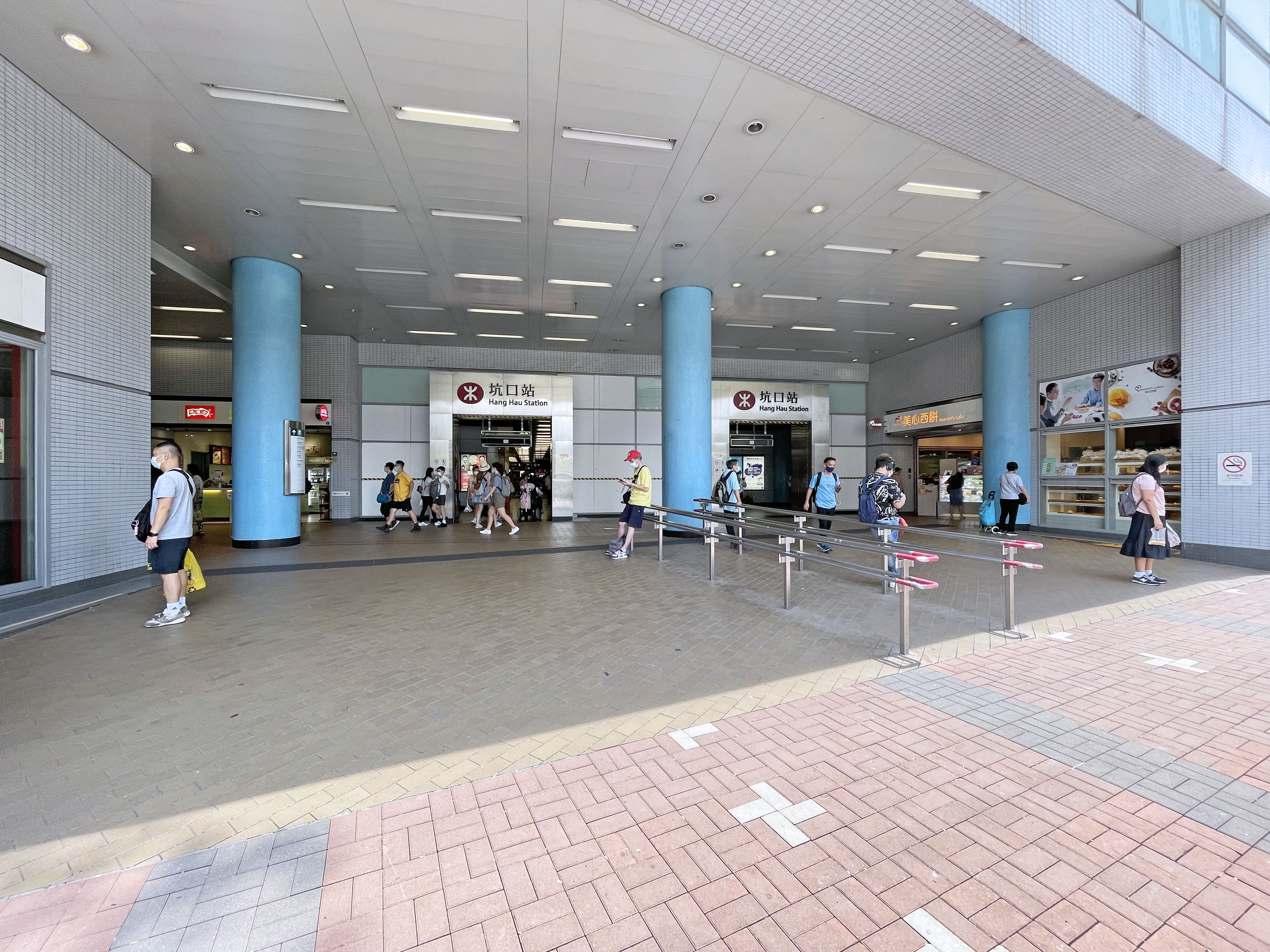
Exits A1 and A2

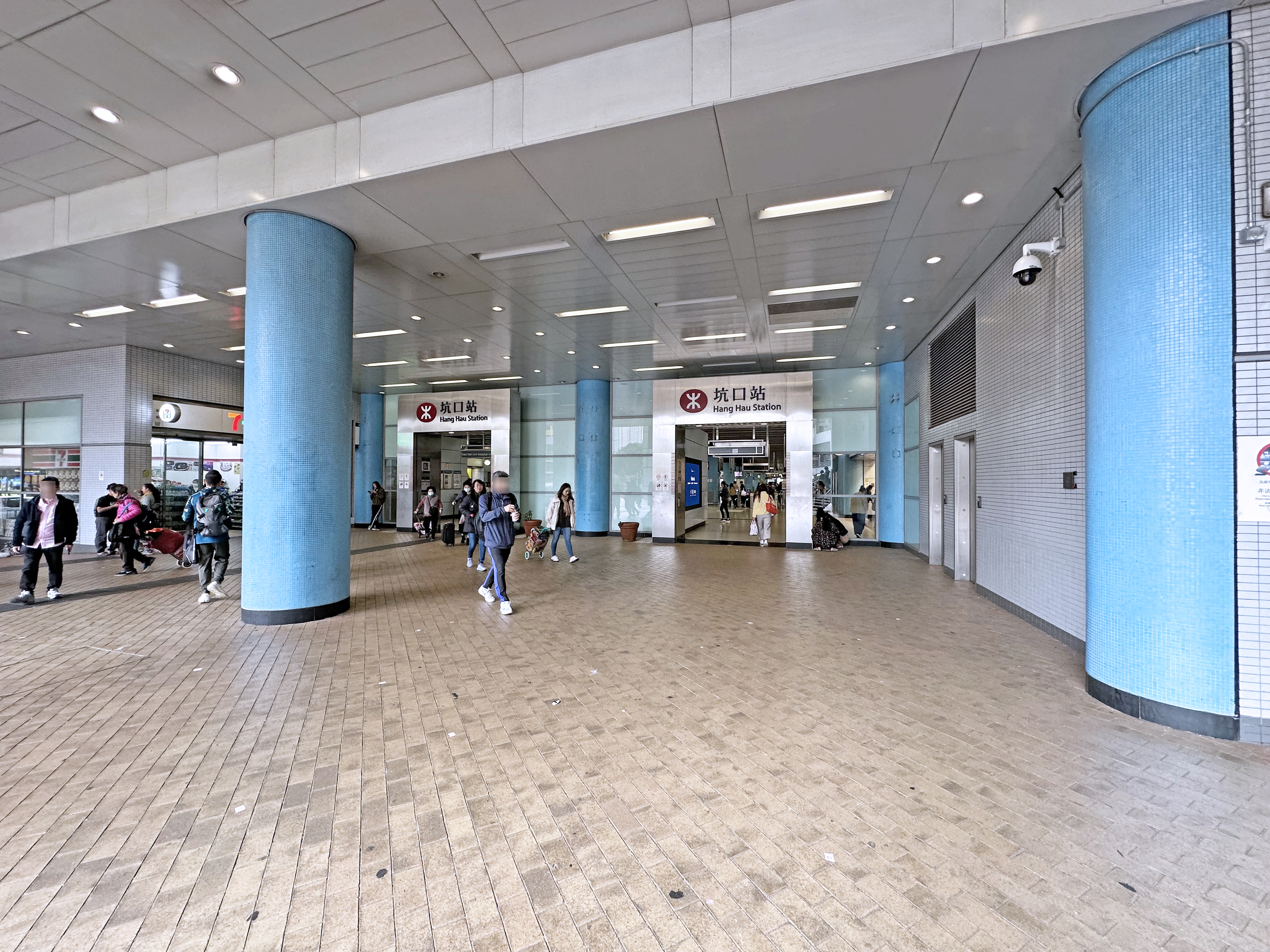
Exits B1 and B2

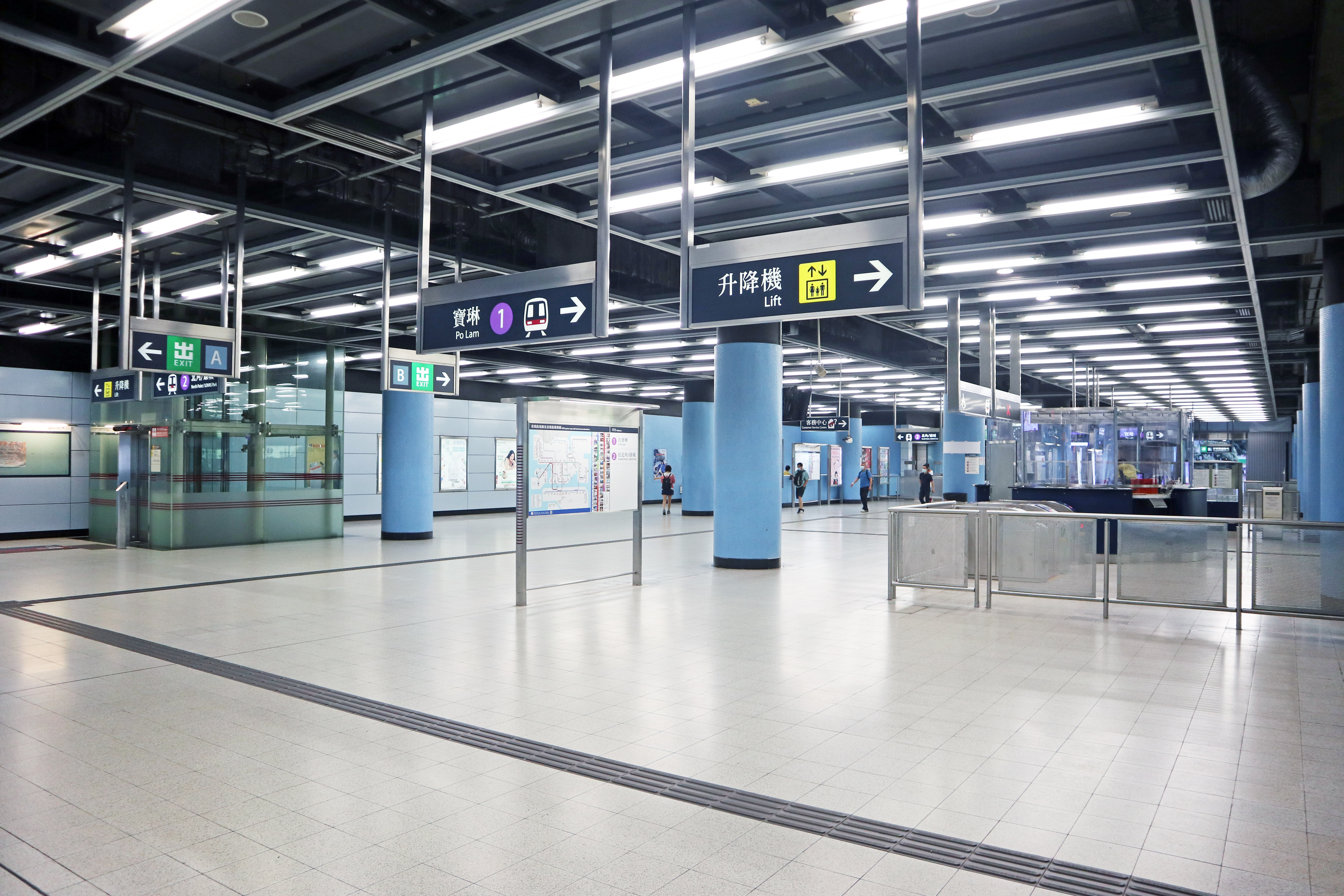
Paid area of the concourse in 2020
