= The Grandiose =

Housing estate in Tseung Kwan O, Hong Kong

Coordinates: 22.3087°N 114.2613°E

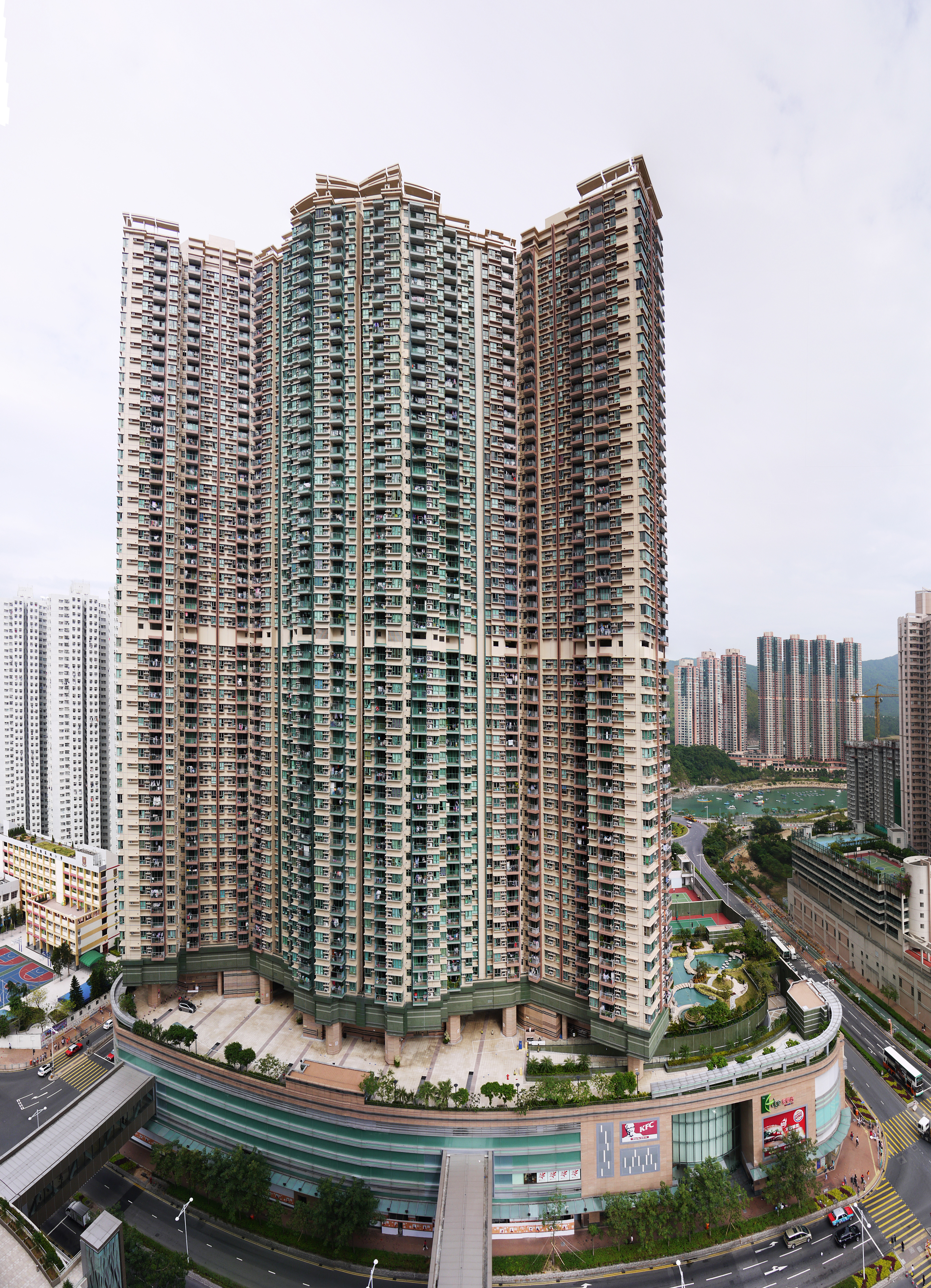
The Grandiose

The Grandiose (Chinese: 君傲灣) is a private housing estate in Tseung Kwan O Town Centre, Tseung Kwan O, New Territories, Hong Kong, near MTR Tseung Kwan O station. It comprises 3 high-rise buildings built in 2006. It is jointly developed by New World Development and MTR Corporation, and constructed by Hip Hing Construction, 28 minutes to Sheung Wan and Central Business District.

== Demographics ==
According to the 2016 by-census, The Grandiose had a population of 3,325. The median age was 38.3 and the majority of residents (93.1 per cent) were of Chinese ethnicity. The average household size was 2.3 people. The median monthly household income of all households (i.e. including both economically active and inactive households) was HK$54,550.

== Politics ==
The Grandiose is located in Fu Kwan constituency of the Sai Kung District Council. It was formerly represented by Luk Ping-choi, who was elected in the 2019 elections until July 2021.

== See also ==
- List of tallest buildings in Hong Kong
