= Kengkou =

Kengkou (Chinese: 坑口; pinyin: kēngkǒu), meaning “tunnel exit”, may refer to:

- Hang Hau, a residential area in Tseung Kwan O, Sai Kung, New Territories, Hong Kong
  - Hang Hau Village, a village in Sai Kung District, New Territories, Hong Kong
- Kengkou, Guangning County, Guangdong Province, China
- Kengkou Township, She County, Anhui Province, China
- Kengkou Village (坑口里), Luzhu District, Taoyuan, Taiwan
- Kengkou Village (坑口里), Wufeng District, Taichung, Taiwan
- Kengkou Village (坑口村), Yamen, Xinhui District, Jiangmen, Guangdong, China

== See also ==
- Kengkou station (disambiguation)
