= Taste (supermarket) =

Hong Kong-based supermarket chain

- Company type: Subsidiary of AS Watson
- Industry: Supermarket
- Founded: 2004
- Headquarters: Hong Kong
- Area served: Hong Kong
- Key people: Li Ka-Shing; Canning Fok
- Parent: AS Watson
- Website: Taste

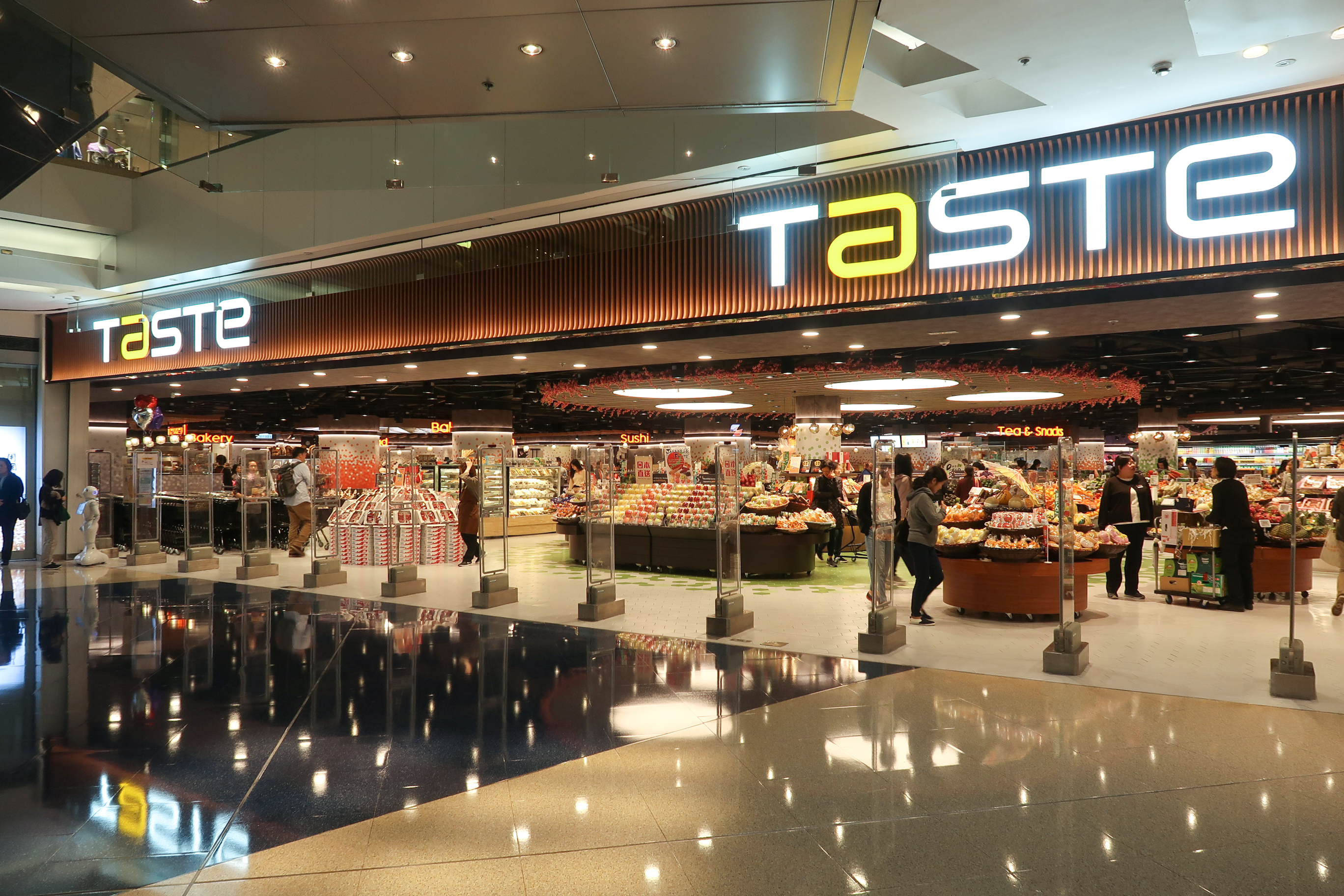
Taste in Festival Walk, Kowloon Tong

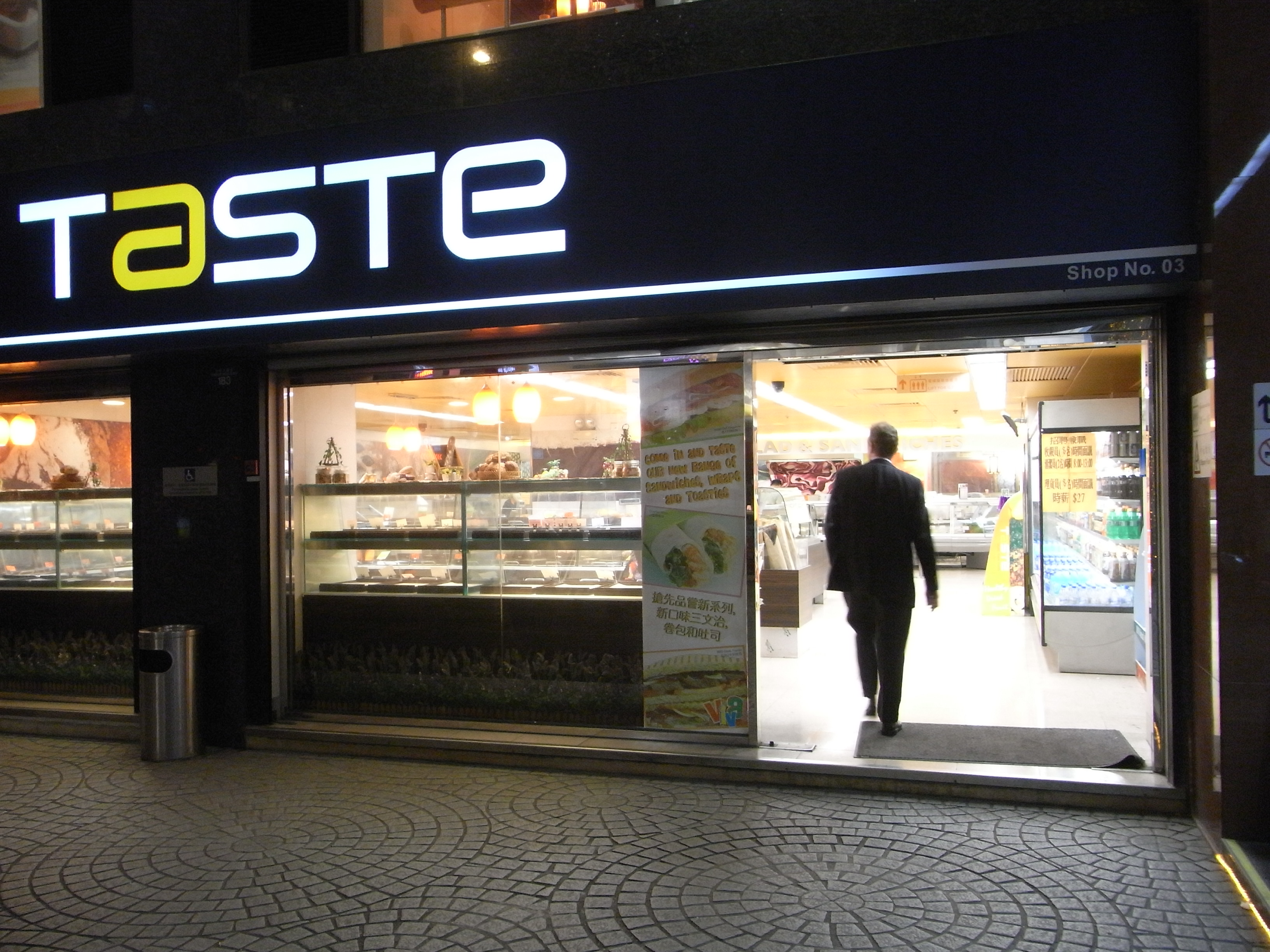
Taste in Hopewell Centre, Wan Chai

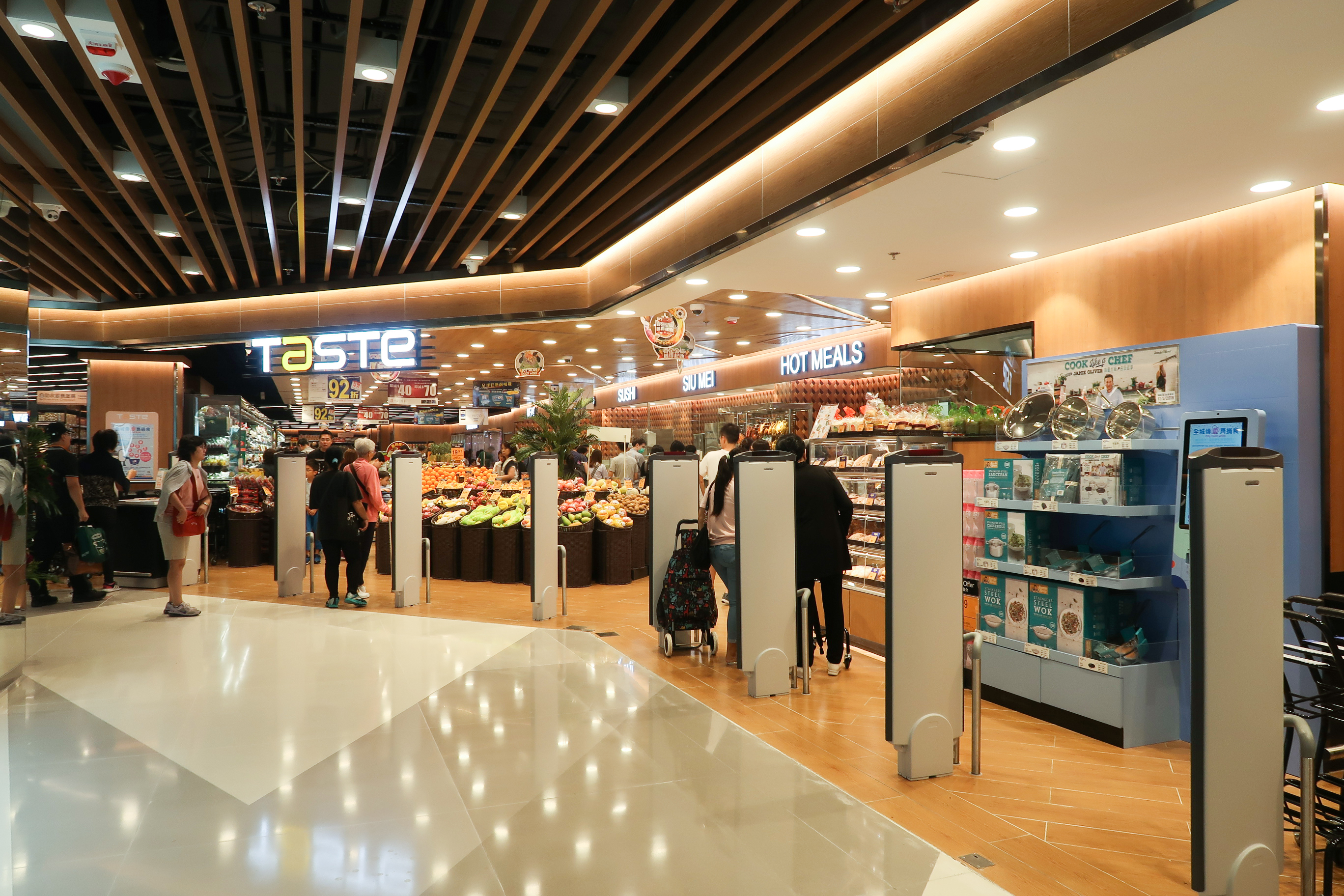
Taste in We Go MALL, Ma On Shan

Taste is a chain supermarket in Hong Kong owned by AS Watson, a wholly owned subsidiary of Hutchison Whampoa Limited. It opened its first branch in Festival Walk, Kowloon Tong in 2004, but most of the branches are opened based on the re-decoration of Park'n Shop, Taste's sister company. Its main customers are middle-class families. Its retail products are similar to those in ParknShop and Great.

== Locations ==
=== Hong Kong ===
- Amoy Plaza (Ngau Tau Kok)
- Citimall (Yuen Long) (Closed in 2020)
- Citygate Outlets (Tung Chung)
- Celestial Heights (Ho Man Tin)
- East Point City (Hang Hau, Tseung Kwan O) (Closed in 2016)
- Festival Walk (Kowloon Tong)
- Hollywood Plaza (Diamond Hill)
- Hopewell Centre (Wan Chai)
- Island Place (North Point)
- Luk Yeung Galleria (Tsuen Wan)
- Ma On Shan Plaza (Ma On Shan)
- Maritime Square (Tsing Yi)
- Metroplaza (Kwai Fong, Kwai Chung)(Closed in 2017）
- Olympian City 2 (Tai Kok Tsui) (Closed in 2017)
- OP Mall (Tsuen Wan)
- Site 12, Whampoa Garden (Hung Hom)
- Shun Tak Centre (Sheung Wan) (Closed in 2018)
- Stanley Plaza (Stanley) (Closed in 2017)
- Tuen Mun Town Plaza (Tuen Mun)
- We Go Mall (Ma On Shan)
- Island Resort (Hong Kong) (Siu Sai Wan)

=== Macau ===
- Nova Mall (Macau)

=== Mainland China ===
- China Plaza (Guangzhou)
- Grandview Mall (Guangzhou)
- Gubei Rd (Shanghai) (Permanently Closed)
- Huafa Mall (Zhuhai)
- Kingglory Plaza (Shenzhen)
- Luoxi New Town Ruyi Square (Guangzhou)
- Raffles City (Chengdu) (Closed in 2016)
- Raffles City (Shenzhen)

== See also ==
- ParknShop
- Great
- Gourmet
