= ParknShop =

Hong Kong supermarket chain

- Native name: 百佳
- Company type: Supermarket
- Industry: Retailing
- Founded: 1973; 53 years ago
- Headquarters: Hong Kong
- Number of locations: More than 250 stores
- Area served: Hong Kong; Macau; Mainland China
- Parent: CK Hutchison Holdings
- Website: parknshop.com

ParknShop
- Chinese: 百佳
Transcriptions
Standard Mandarin
- Hanyu Pinyin: Bǎijiā
Yue: Cantonese
- Yale Romanization: Baak Gāai
- Jyutping: baak3 gaai1

ParknShop (styled PARKnSHOP, Chinese: 百佳) is one of the two largest supermarket chains in Hong Kong, the other being Wellcome. ParknShop operates more than 200 outlets in Hong Kong, Macau and mainland China.

The first ParknShop store opened in Stanley, Hong Kong in 1973. For a decade the store remained a local retailer until the mid-1980s when it began to expand outside Hong Kong.

ParknShop is a member of the AS Watson Group, a subsidiary of CK Hutchison Holdings Limited.

== Locations ==
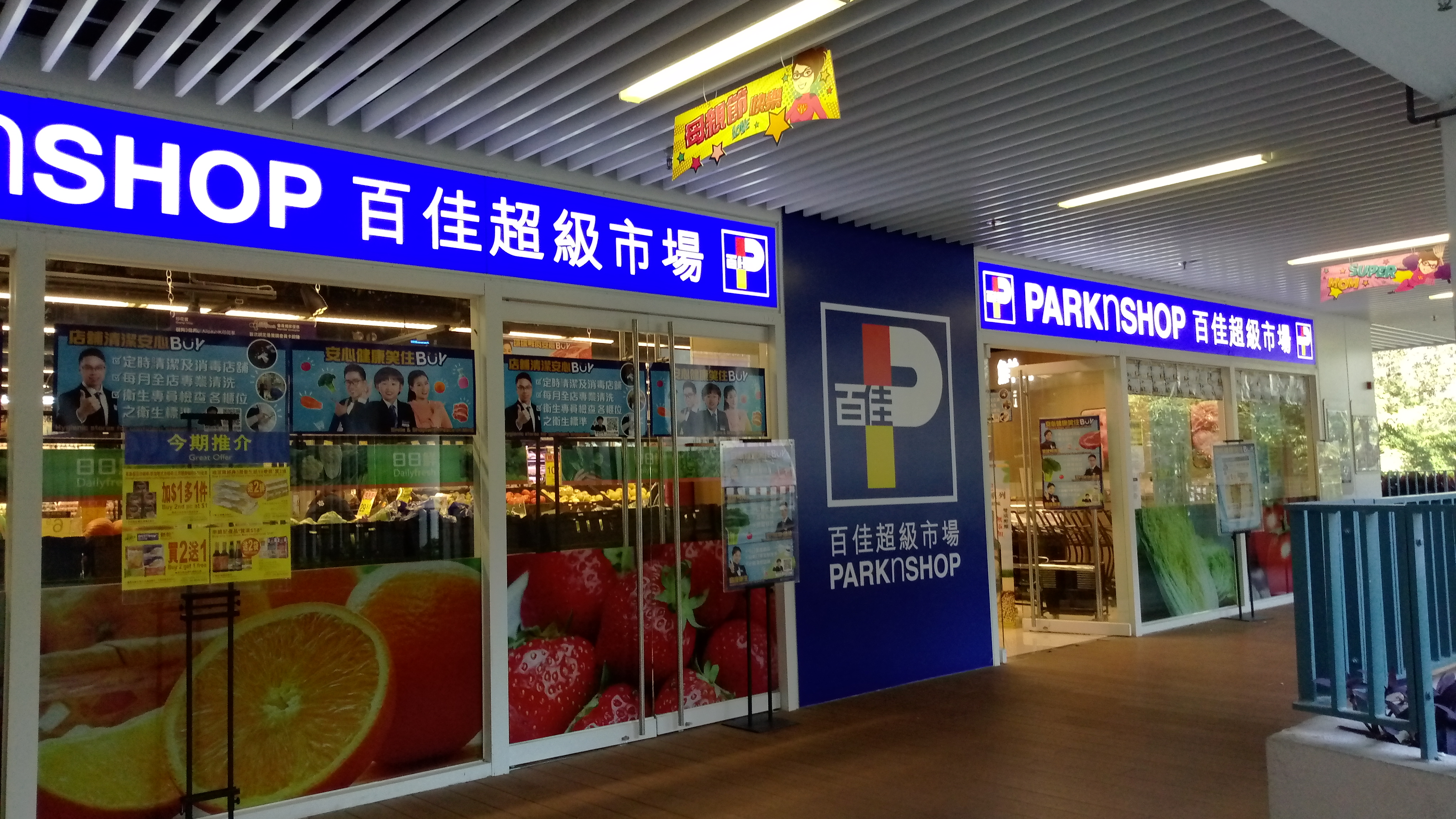
A ParknShop store in So Uk Estate, Sham Shui Po

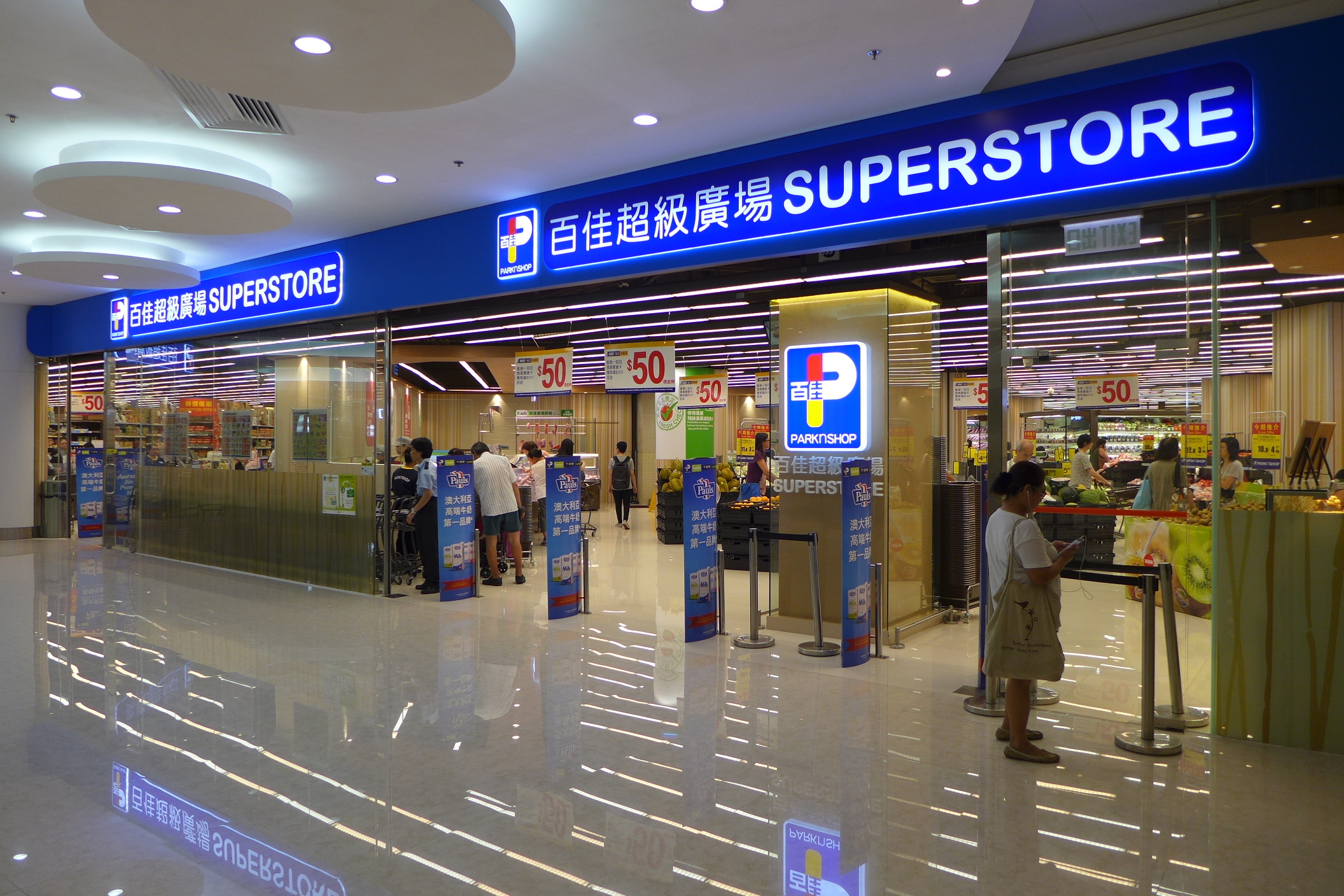
A ParknShop Superstore in Marina Square West

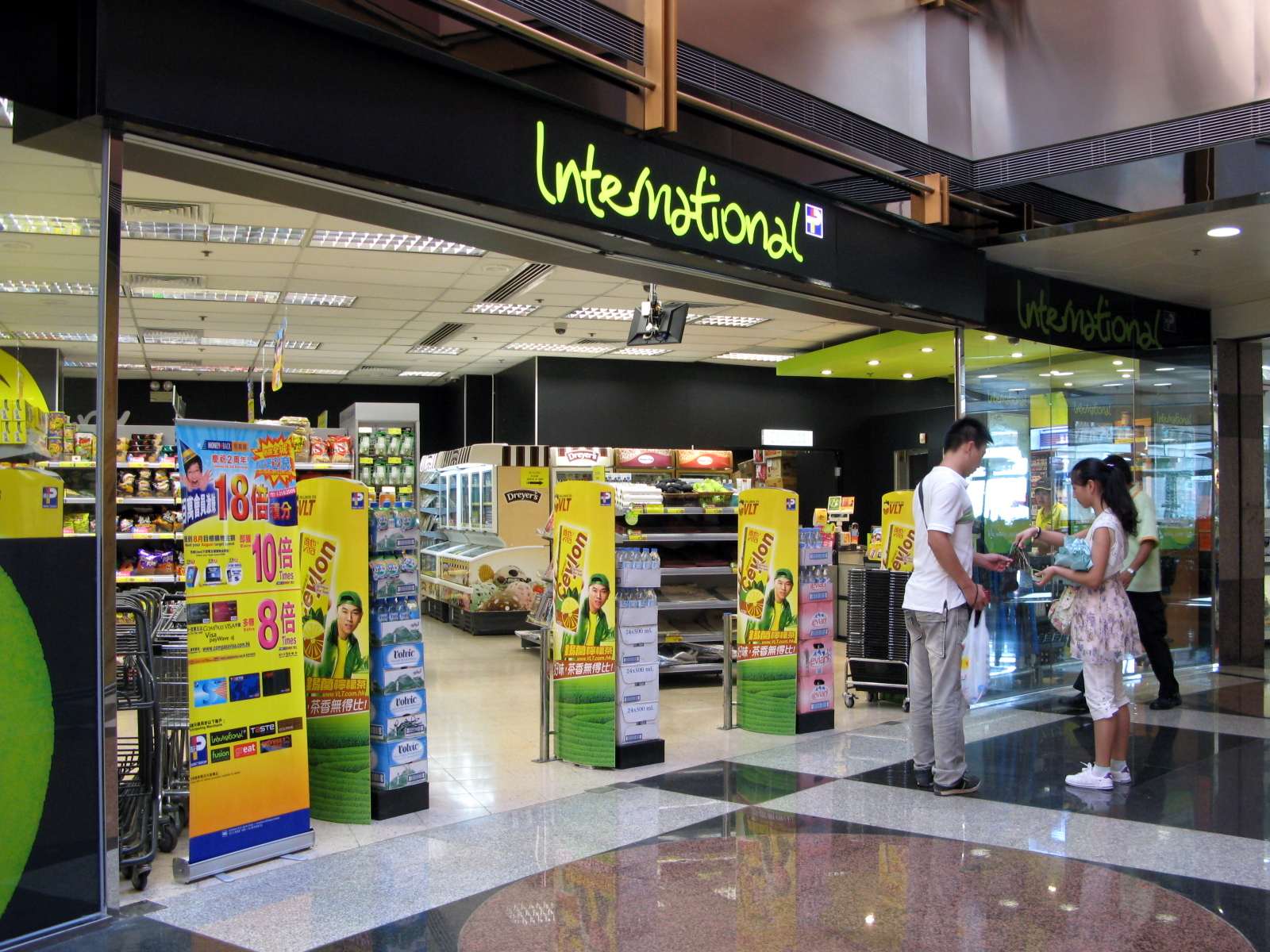
A International by ParknShop store in The Peak Galleria (Permanently Closed)

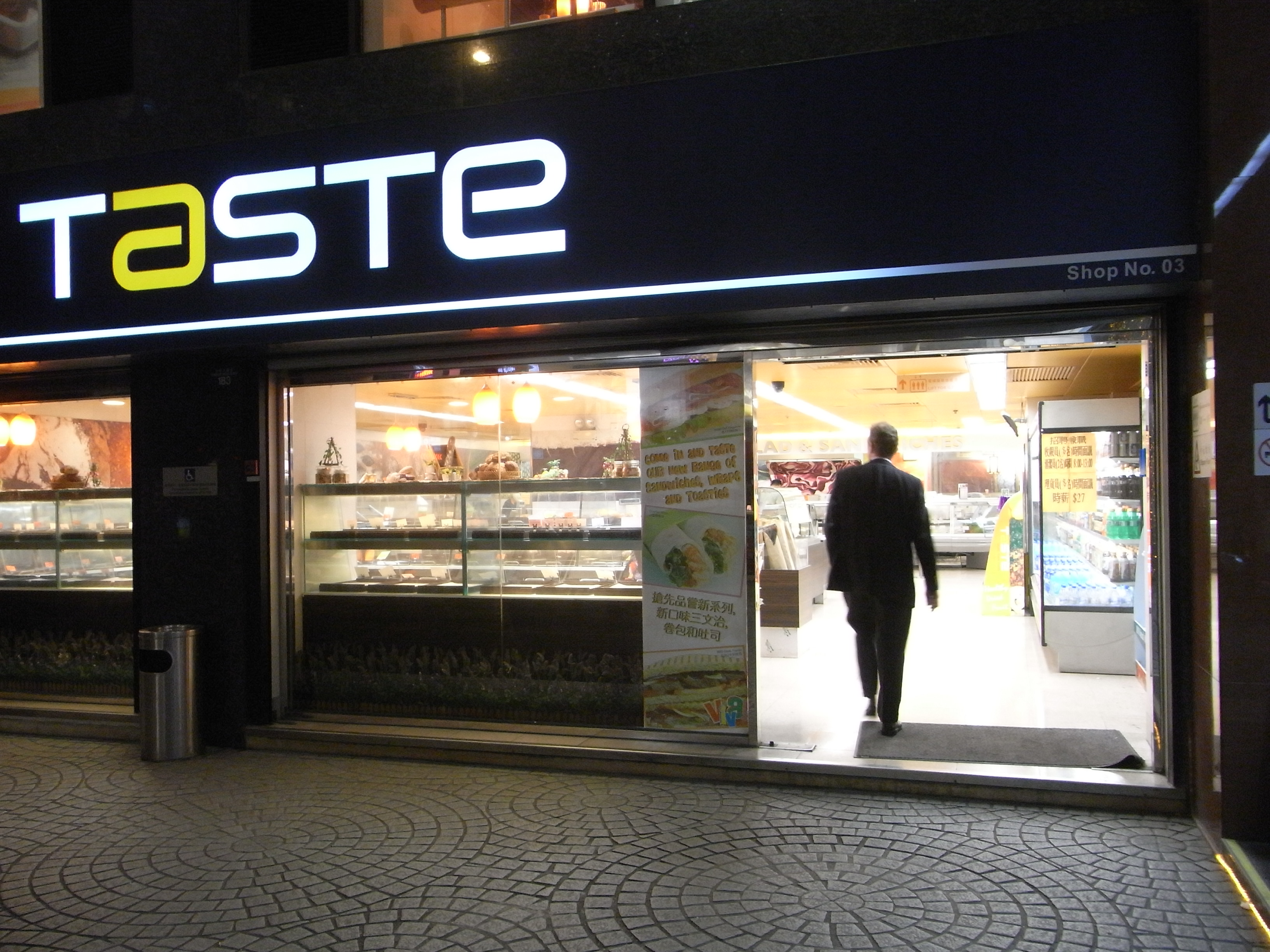
A Taste store in Hopewell Centre, Wan Chai

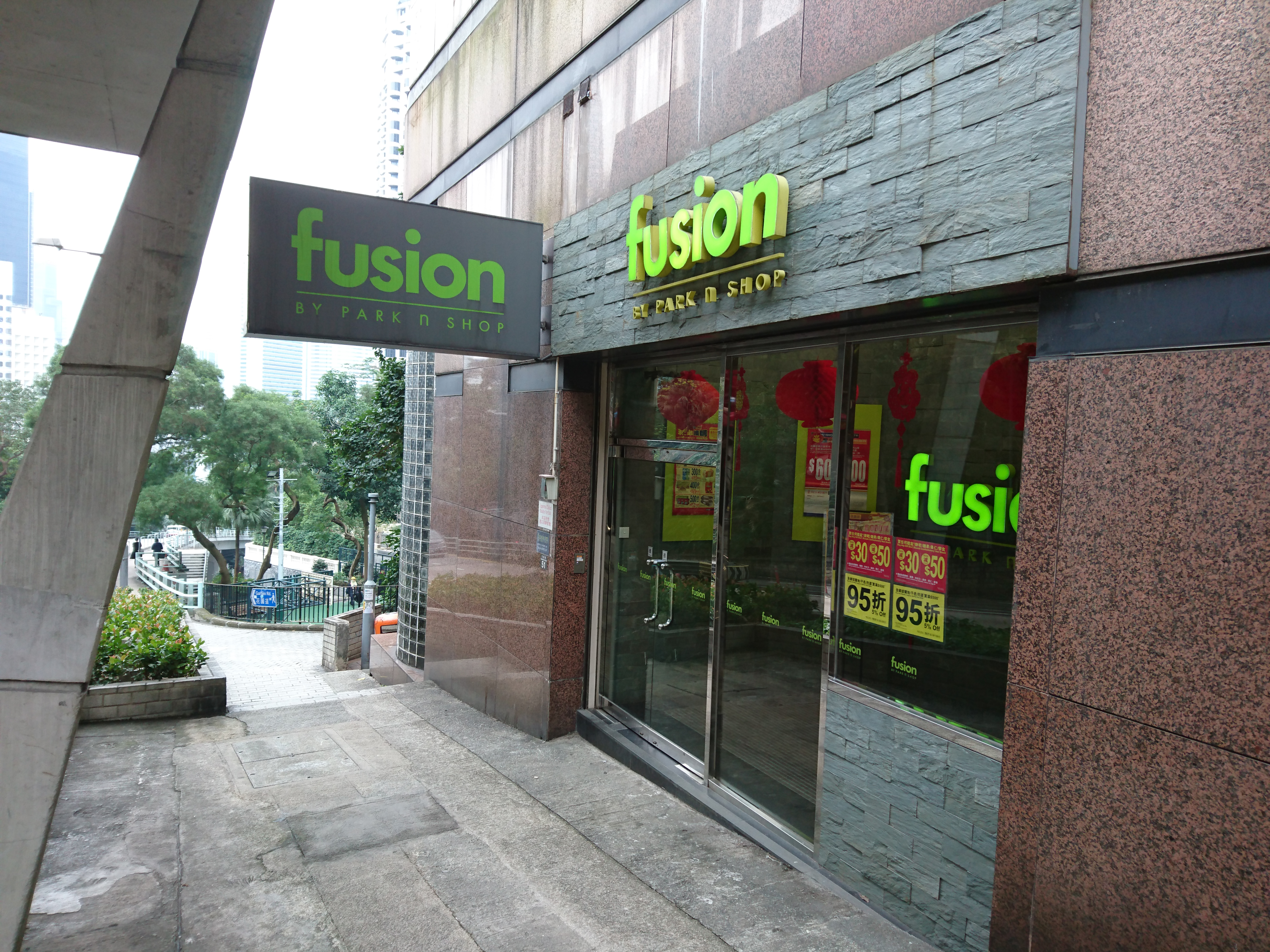
A Fusion by ParknShop store in Garden Road, Central

=== Hong Kong ===
ParknShop has more than 300 stores and 9,000 employees in Hong Kong. ParknShop opened the first superstore (Note: Chinese: 超級廣場; pinyin: Chāojí guǎngchǎng) in Hong Kong in 1996 in Whampoa Garden Phase 12 with a floor space of 4,200 m². The first ParknShop megastore (Note: Chinese: 購物廣場; pinyin: Gòuwù guǎngchǎng) opened in 2002 in Metro City Tseung Kwan O with a floor space of 6,700 m².

Until 2021, AS Watson Group also operates a number of supermarkets under different brand names that target higher-income consumers. There is one Great supermarket located at Pacific Place, two Gourmet supermarkets at Lee Tung Avenue (Wan Chai) and Caine Road (Mid-Levels), and 14 other Taste supermarkets. In 2006, another brand, International by ParknShop, was introduced first two stores in Happy Valley and United Centre at Admiralty which specialises in organic foods. In 2008, another brand, Fusion by ParknShop, was introduced the first store in Discovery Bay. Later on, both International by ParknShop and Fusion by ParknShop was expanded to lots of places.

ParknShop's higher-income stores are billed as a "lifestyle" food stores and stock a large variety of imported goods, as well as fresh fruit and vegetables and many nonfood items. The upmarket stores were launched in November 2004, when the existing 3,300 m^{2} (35,000 sq ft) ParknShop store located at Festival Walk in Kowloon Tong was rebranded as Taste.

=== Mainland China ===
In 1984 ParknShop opened its first mainland China store in Shekou, the first foreign retailer to enter the mainland Chinese market. The chain's first mainland superstore opened in 2000 and its first mainland megastore followed in 2001 in the Tianhe district of Guangzhou. There are now about sixty ParknShop stores in northern and southern China, including locations in Guangzhou, Shenzhen, Dongguan, Zhuhai and Huizhou.

== History ==
=== Labour outsourcing ===
In April 2005, the ParknShop chain, including the rebranded Taste superstore in Festival Walk, controversially dismissed 525 employees, when the company outsourced the labour for its fresh foods counter; most of the employees were dismissed just before the Chinese New Year in 2006. The aggrieved employees included many low-paid workers of longtime service. The employees' union complained that although 90% of the dismissed workers were rehired at the same position as before, their wages were lowered (some reportedly by as much as 44%), and their working hours were increased from 10 to 12 hours by the outsourcing subcontractor. The resulting average hourly rate was HK$18.

=== Proposed sale by Hutchison ===
In 2013, Hutchison invited bids for the entire ParknShop chain, during "a strategic review" of the ParknShop business, for an expected price of US$3 billion to US$4 billion. The company received eight bids, from: China Resources Vanguard (China / Hong Kong), Wal-Mart Stores (US), Aeon (Japan), Woolworths (Australia) and Wesfarmers (Australia), CP Group (Thailand), and Sun Art Retail (China). However, in October the company announced that it would retain ownership of the chain and focus on expanding in China.

=== Generic products ===
ParknShop sells products under generic brands, both what it calls "private label" (Note: Chinese: 百佳牌; pinyin: Bǎi Jiā pái), "fresh market" (Note: Chinese: 百鮮佳; pinyin: Bǎi Xiān Jiā) and "Best Buy" (Note: Chinese: 超值牌; pinyin: Chāo zhí pái) branding. Their group of supermarkets also exclusively carries a variety of Waitrose and Groupe Casino products from the UK and France respectively.

In 2007, Hong Kong supermarket chain ParknShop was fined HK$45,000 ($5,801)for mislabelling oil fish as cod, after a number of customers came down with diarrhoea after eating the fish, said newspaper The Standard. The court said that the fish was unfit for human consumption, and it was mislabelled at source in Indonesia, according to the report.

In 2015, ParknShop allegedly sold a customer rotten egg and later refused to turn them over to the Food and Environment Hygiene Department (FEHD) for examination, Ming Pao Daily reported Wednesday.

In 2017, ParknShop was involved in a Brazilian Meat Food Safety Scandal that brought to light that this meat wasn't properly inspected and was in fact rotten. As Hong Kong was the second-biggest buyer of Brazilian meat last year, the supermarket chain ParknShop said it had removed all Brazilian pork, beef and chicken from its stores’ shelves in order to clear all suspicions.

In 2017, Europe Egg Scandal happened, where contaminated eggs spread to Hong Kong. It was confirmed that eggs have been tainted with unsafe levels of insecticide. Eggs contained excessive level of Fipronil, a highly toxic pest control chemical banned from the production of food. Shops were asked to remove the products from shelves, and instructed the importer to initiate a recall. This included ParknShop.

In 2017, Candied winter melon covered in mold were found in Guangzhou PARKnSHOP and first reported on April 29.

ParknShop participates in A.S. Watson's customer loyalty program, called "MoneyBack" (Note: Chinese: 易賞錢).

== See also ==
- City'super
- Wellcome Supermarkets
