= Takming =

Takming is one of the 29 constituencies in the Sai Kung District.

Takming may also refer to:

- Ching Tak-ming (程德明), a character in Hong Kong film series Storm film series (反貪腐風暴系列電影)
- Koo Tak-Ming (古德明), a character in Hong Kong television series A Smiling Ghost Story (衝上人間)
- Sun Yat-sen (1866 – 1925), whose born name is Sun Tak-ming (孫德明), a Chinese revolutionary statesman, physician, and political philosopher
  - Takming University of Science and Technology, name after Sun Tak-ming, a private university in Taipei, Taiwan
  - Xihu metro station, where the deputy station name is Takming University, a metro station of the Taipei Metro
- Song Tak-ming (宋德明), a character in Hong Kong television series Heartbreak Blues (與郎共舞)
