= Gourmet (disambiguation) =

Gourmet is a cultural ideal associated with the culinary arts of fine food and drink.

Gourmet may also refer to:

== Restaurants ==
- Gourmet Room or Gourmet Restaurant, a Cincinnati fine-dining restaurant

== Companies ==
- Gourmet (supermarket), a Hong Kong supermarket
- Gourmet Foods, a Pakistani bakery and confectionery chain

== Media ==
- Gourmet (magazine), a defunct food and wine magazine (1941–2009)
- Gourmet (TV series), a 2008 South Korean TV series

== People ==
- François Gourmet (born 1982), a Belgian decathlete
- Olivier Gourmet (born 1963), a Belgian actor

== Other uses ==
- Gourmet Museum and Library, a Belgian museum
