= Shui Bin Village =

Village in Hong Kong

Coordinates: 22.321308°N 114.26794°E

Shui Bin Village (Chinese: 水邊村) is a village in the Hang Hau area of Sai Kung District, New Territories, Hong Kong.

== History ==
Shui Bin Village is a fishermen village established in the 1970s to improve living conditions.
