= Great Food Hall =

Supermarket in Hong Kong

Great
- Company type: Privately owned company
- Industry: Supermarket
- Founded: 2000
- Headquarters: Hong Kong
- Area served: Hong Kong
- Key people: Mr. Li Ka-shing; Mr. Canning Fok
- Parent: AS Watson
- Website: Great

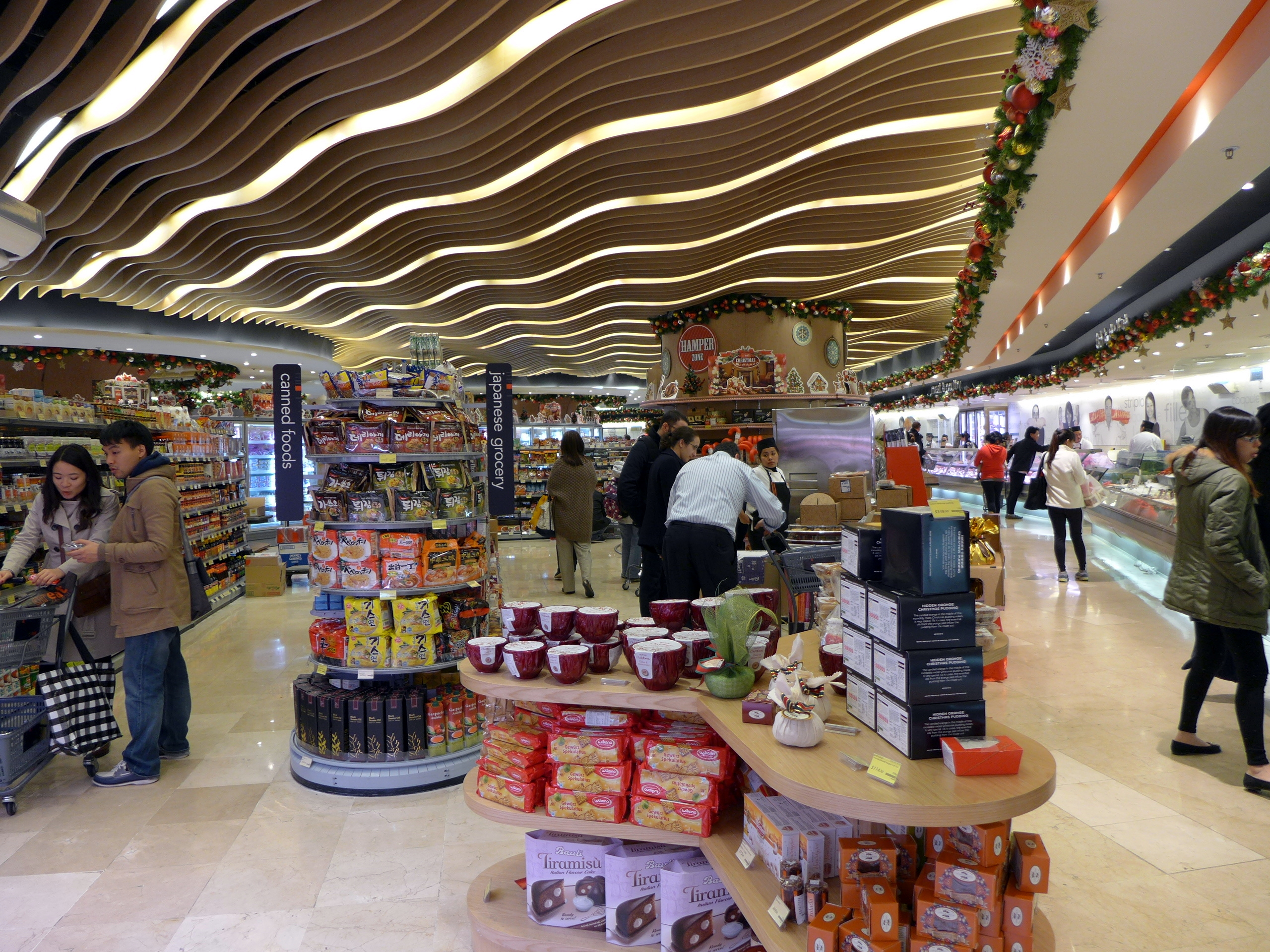
Great Food Hall in Pacific Place

Great Food Hall is a supermarket founded in 2000 in Hong Kong. It is owned by AS Watson, a wholly owned subsidiary of Hutchison Whampoa Limited. It has a branch in Pacific Place, Admiralty, which was opened in 2000 based on the re-decoration of Park'n Shop, Great's sister company. Its main customers are middle-class families. There is also a Triple O's burger restaurant, a café with food, and an ice cream stand inside the store.

== See also ==
- Park'n Shop
- Taste (supermarket)
- Gourmet (supermarket)
