= Ming Tak Estate =

Public housing estate in Tseung Kwan O, Hong Kong

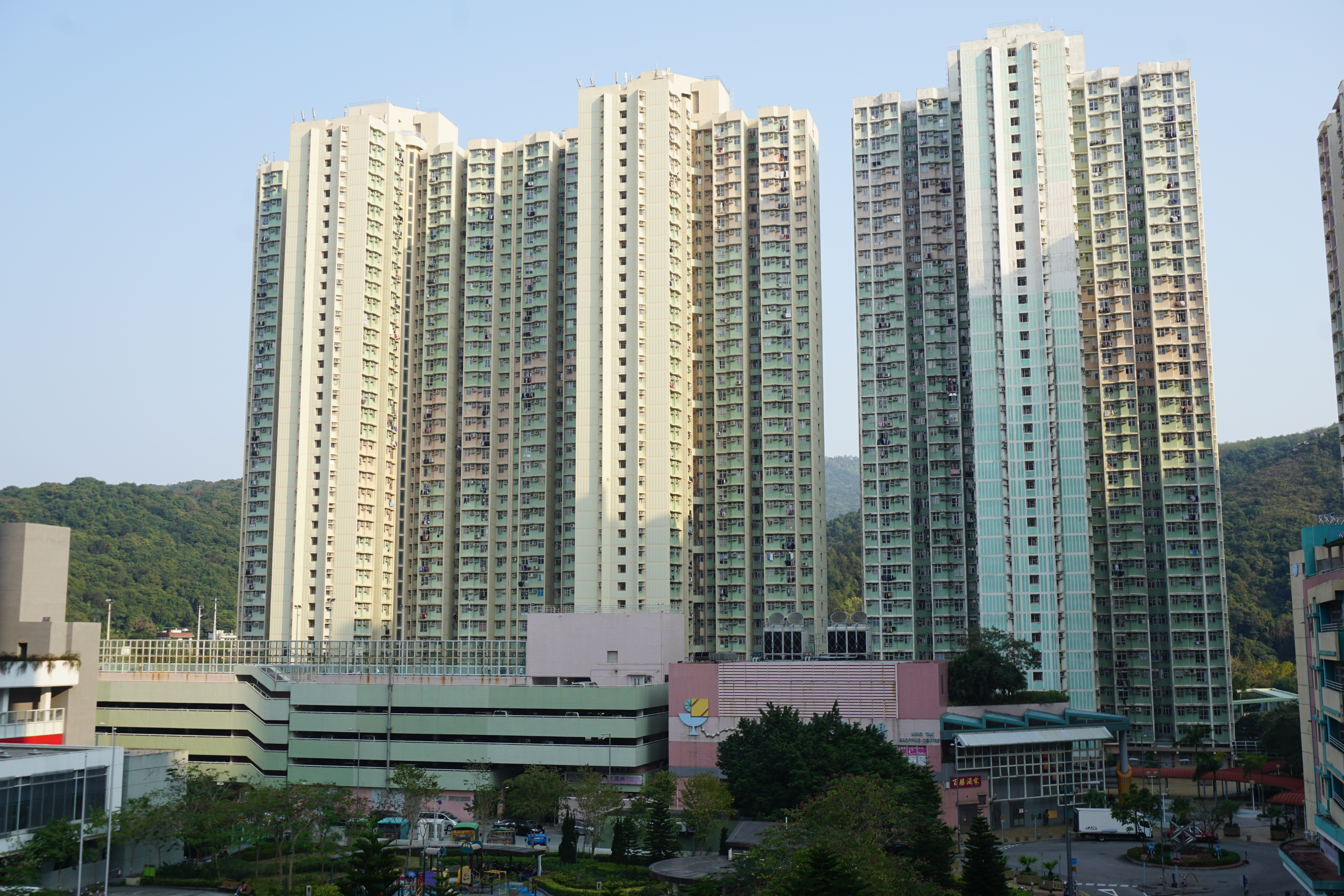
- Ming Tak Estate
- Interactive map of Ming Tak Estate

General information
- Location: 10 Pui Shing Lane, Hang Hau; Tseung Kwan O New Territories, Hong Kong
- Coordinates: 22.3163°N 114.26923°E
- Status: Completed
- Category: Public rental housing
- Population: 4,393 (2016)
- No. of blocks: 2
- No. of units: 1,561

Construction
- Constructed: 1996; 30 years ago
- Authority: Hong Kong Housing Authority

Ming Tak Estate (Chinese: 明德邨) is a public housing estate in Hang Hau, Tseung Kwan O, New Territories, Hong Kong, near Tseung Kwan O Hospital. It is the fifth public housing estate in Tseung Kwan O and comprises 2 blocks of Harmony I style built in 1996.

Hin Ming Court (顯明苑), Yuk Ming Court (煜明苑) and Wo Ming Court (和明苑) are Home Ownership Scheme housing courts in Tseung Kwan O near Ming Tak Estate, built between 1996 and 1999.

== Houses ==
=== Ming Tak Estate ===
Name	Chinese name	Building type	Completed
Ming Kok House	明覺樓	Harmony 1 Option 6 (2 Gen.)	1996
Ming Toa House	明道樓	Harmony 1 Option 6 (2 Gen.)	1996

=== Hin Ming Court ===
Name	Chinese name	Building type	Completed
Hin Ming Court	顯明苑	Harmony 1 Option 5 (2 Gen.)	1996

=== Yuk Ming Court ===
Name	Chinese name	Building type	Completed
Wai Ming House	煒明閣	Harmony 2 Option 7 (2 Gen.)	1996
Kwan Ming House	焜明閣	Harmony 2 Option 7 (2 Gen.)	1996
Hei Ming House	熹明閣	Harmony 2 Option 7 (2 Gen.)	1996

=== Wo Ming Court ===
Name	Chinese name	Building type	Completed
Wo Yat House	和逸閣	Harmony 1 Option 7 (3.5 Gen.)	1999
Wo Fai House	和暉閣	Harmony 1 Option 7 (3.5 Gen.)	1999
Wo Cheong House	和暢閣	Concord 2 Option 2	1999
Wo Hui House	和煦閣	Concord 2 Option 2	1999

== Demographics ==
According to the 2016 by-census, Ming Tak Estate had a population of 4,393, Yuk Ming Court had a population of 5,591 while Wo Ming Court had a population of 4,976. Altogether the population amounts to 14,960.

== Politics ==
Ming Tak Estate, Hin Ming Court, Yuk Ming Court and Wo Ming Court are located in Tak Ming constituency of the Sai Kung District Council. It was formerly represented by Cheng Chung-man, who was elected in the 2019 elections until July 2021.

== See also ==
- Public housing estates in Tseung Kwan O
