= East Point City =

Housing estate in Hang Hau, Tseung Kwan O

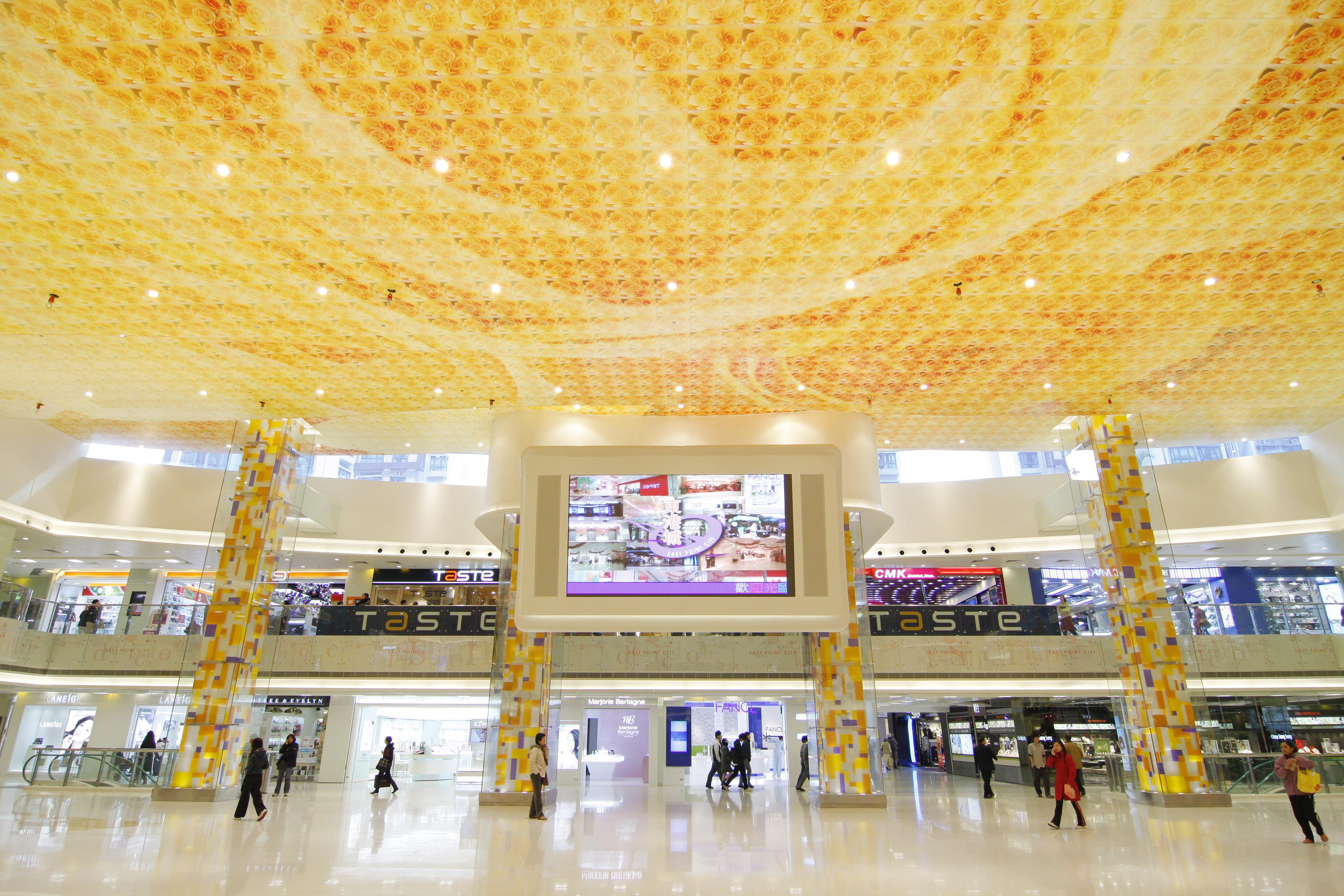
- Location: 8 Chung Wa Road, Tseung Kwan O, Sai Kung District, New Territories, Hong Kong
- Coordinates: 22.31636°N 114.26516°E
- Opened: October 1997; 29 years ago
- Developer: Sun Hung Kai Properties
- Manager: Kai Shing Management
- Owner: Sun Hung Kai Properties
- Num. of stores: 150
- Floor area: 400,000 sq ft (37,000 m^{2})
- Floors: www.eastpointcity.com.hk

East Point City (Chinese: 東港城) is a private housing estate and shopping centre in Hang Hau, Tseung Kwan O, New Territories, Hong Kong, near the Hang Hau MTR station. Built on reclaimed land and developed by Sun Hung Kai Properties, the estate consists of seven high-rise buildings and a two-storey shopping centre. A large-scale renovation of the shopping centre was completed in 2008.

== Demographics ==
According to the 2016 by-census, East Point City had a population of 7,054. The median age was 41.6 and the majority of residents (90.4 per cent) were of Chinese ethnicity. The average household size was 3.4 people. The median monthly household income of all households (i.e. including both economically active and inactive households) was HK$59,160.

== Politics ==
East Point City is located in Nam On constituency of the Sai Kung District Council. It is currently represented by Francis Chau Yin-ming, who was elected in the 2019 elections.

== Gallery ==
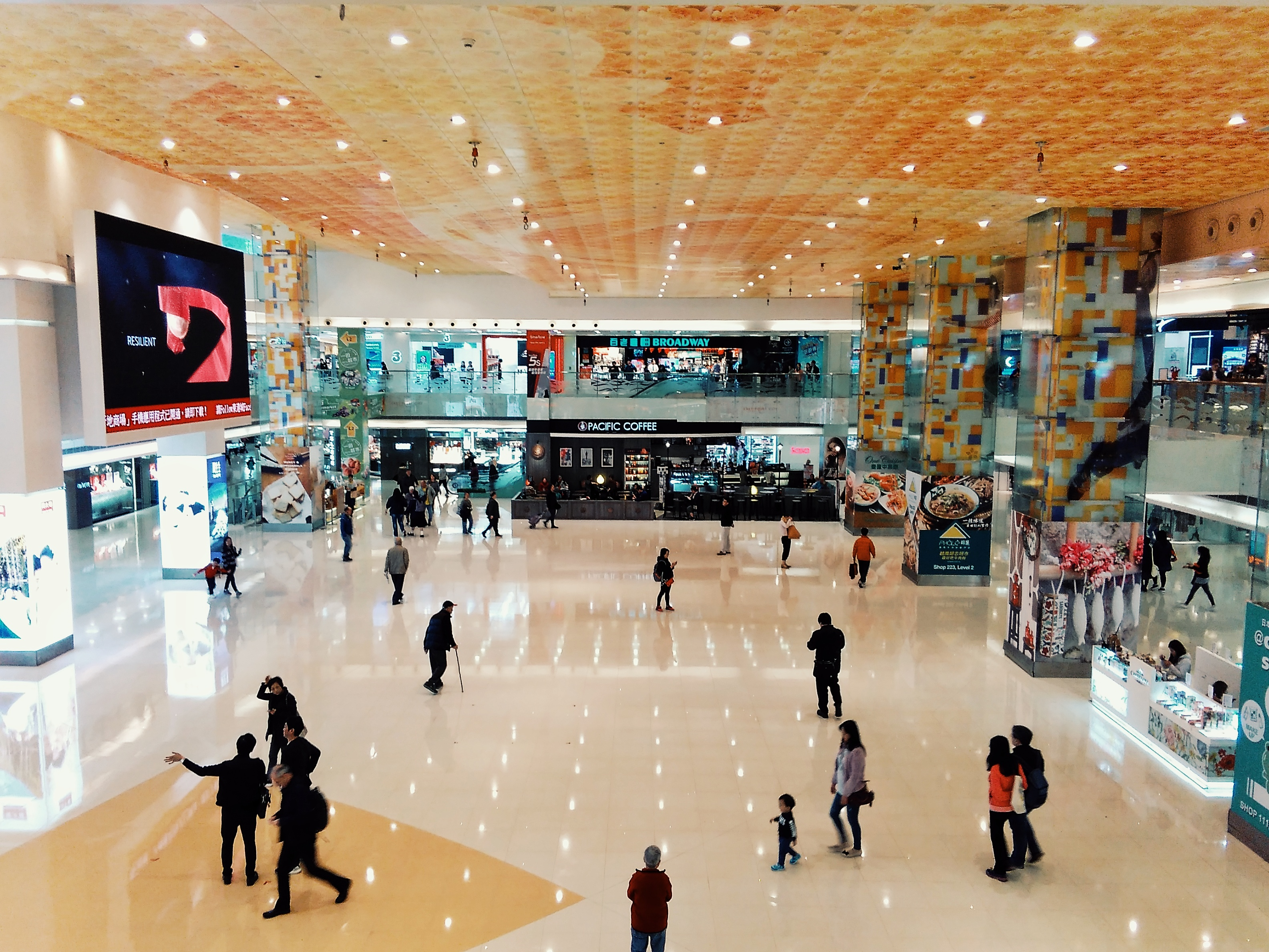
East Point City Atrium in 2018

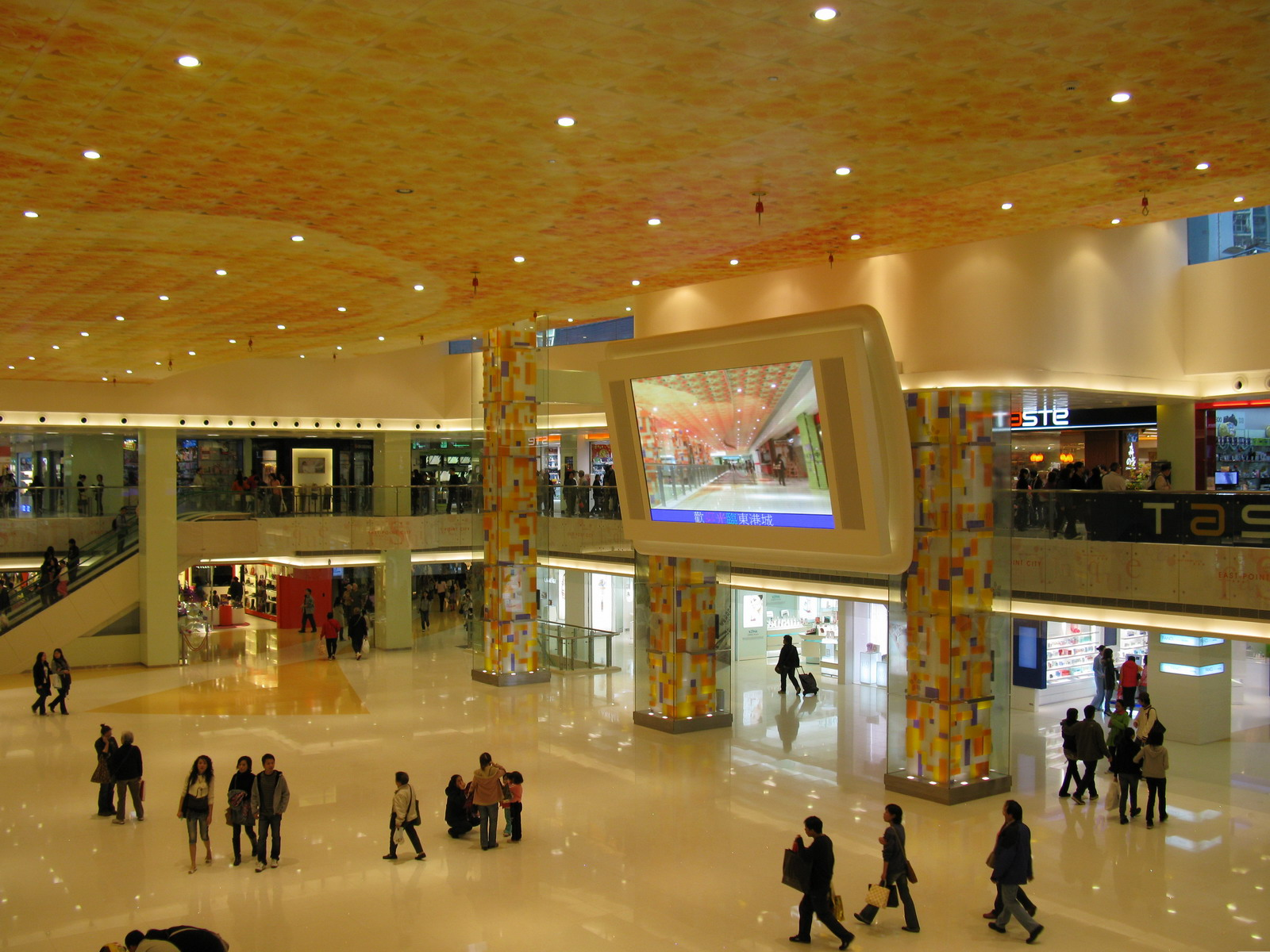
East Point City Atrium in 2008

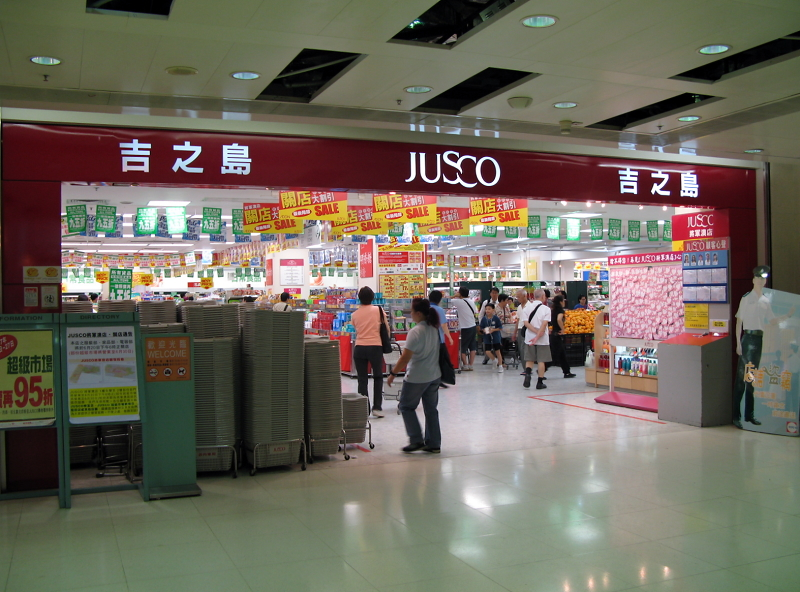
JUSCO Department Store was located at East Point City, but closed in 2007

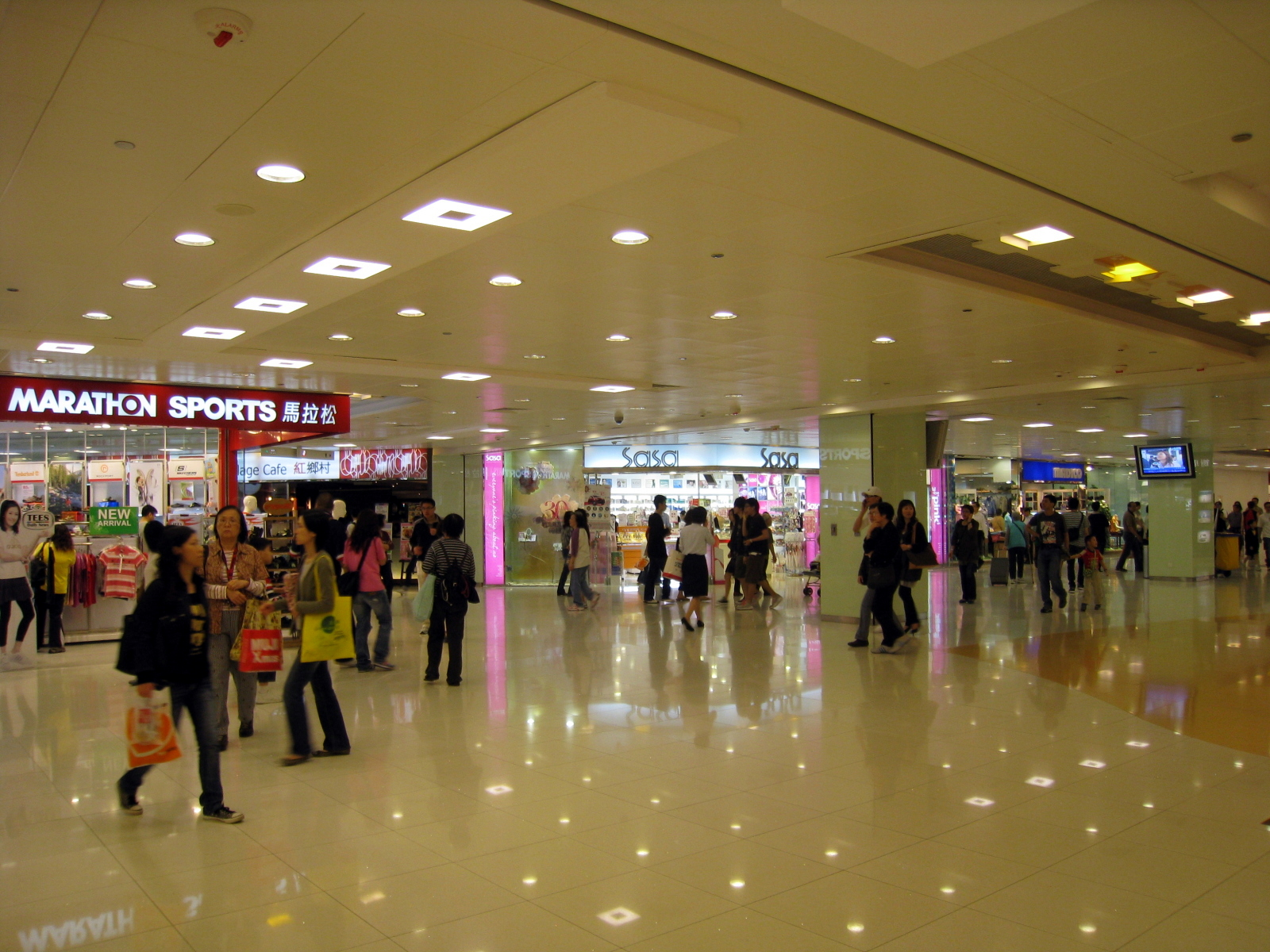
1st Floor of East Point City Shopping Centre after renovation in 2008
