= Hang Hau Village =

Coordinates: 22.32103°N 114.26656°E

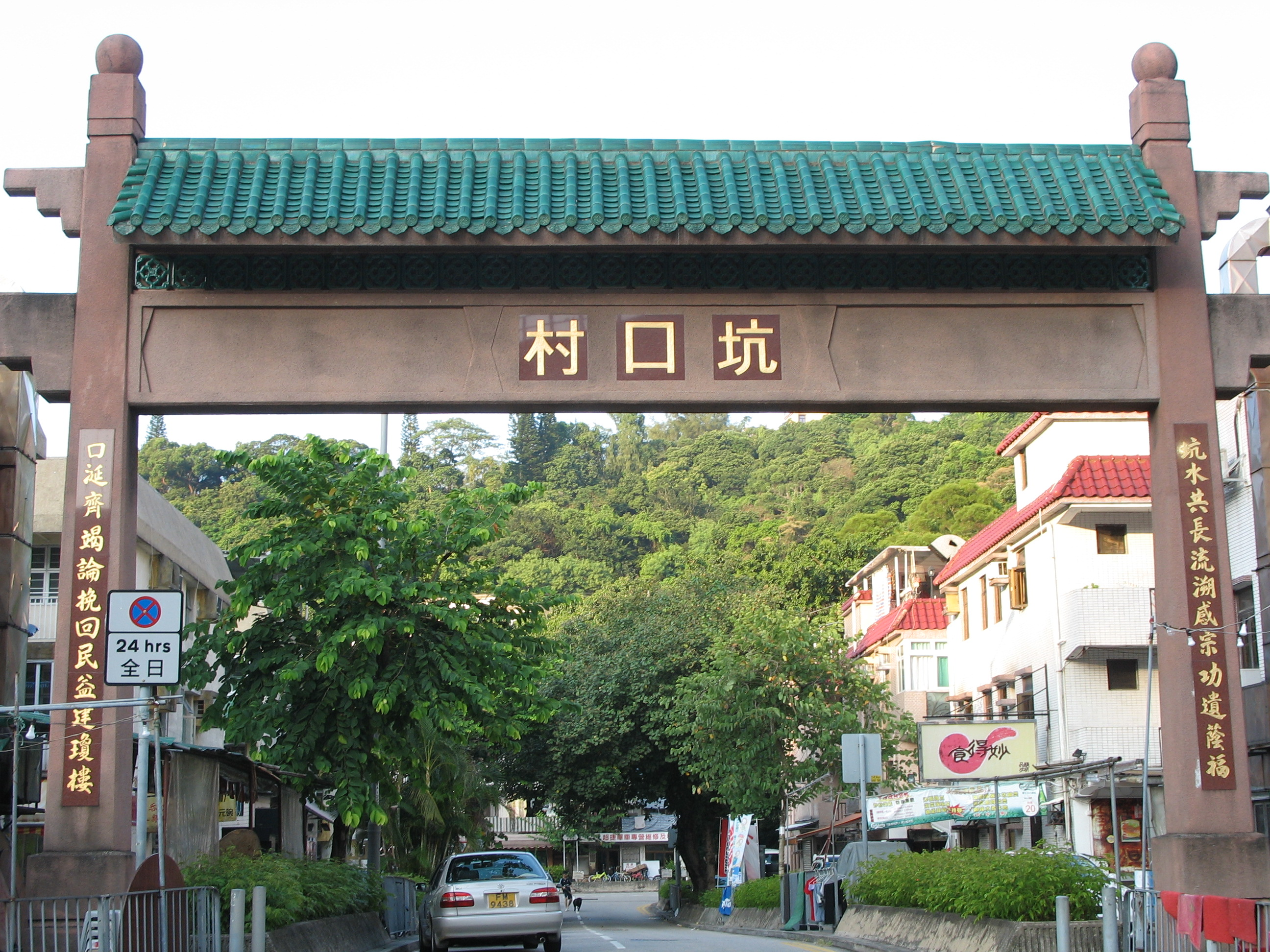
Entrance gate of Hang Hau Village.

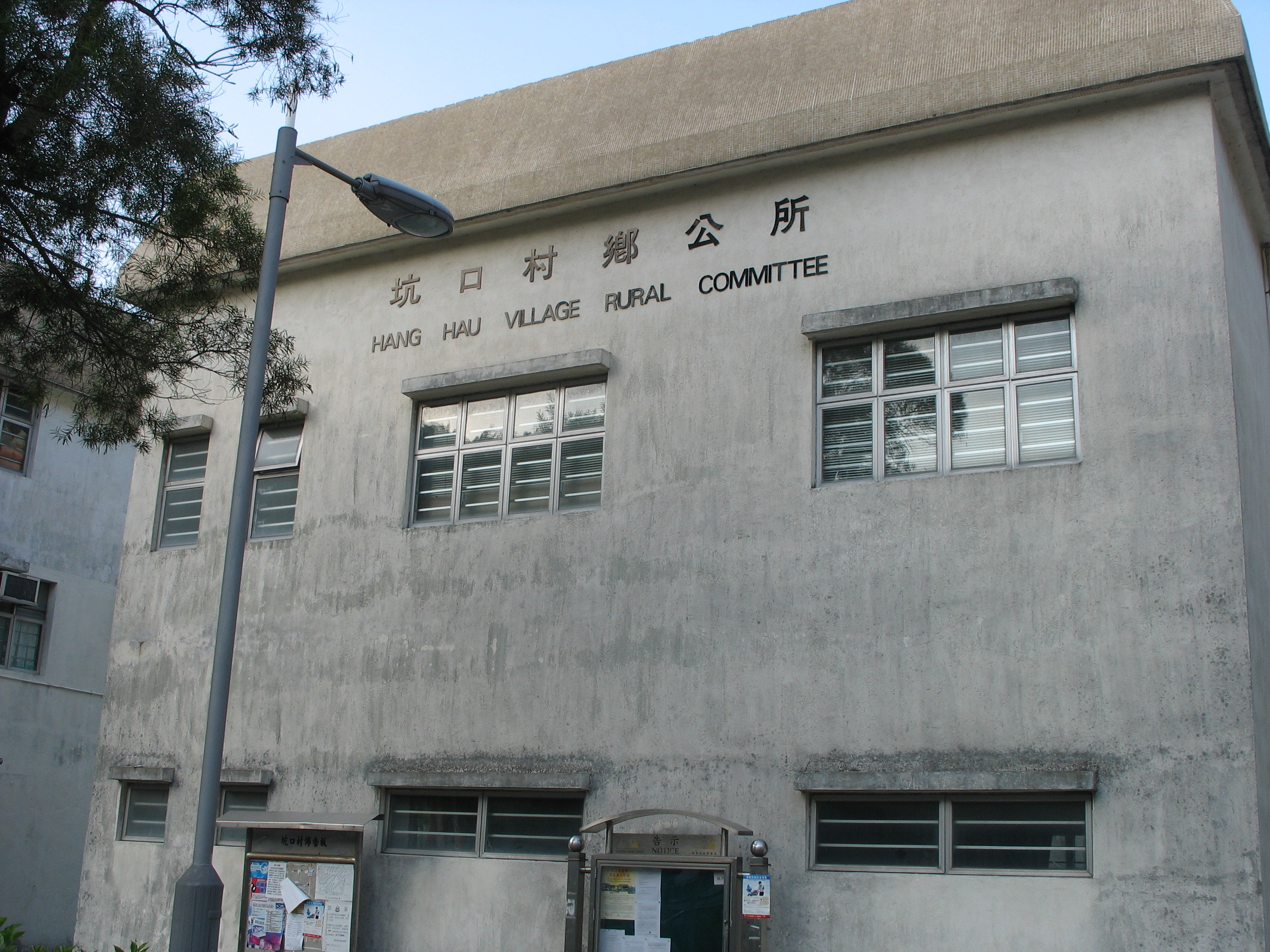
Hang Hau Village Rural Committee building.

Hang Hau Village (Chinese: 坑口村) is a village in Sai Kung District, New Territories, Hong Kong.

== History ==
At the time of the 1911 census, the population of Hang Hau was 387. The number of males was 262.

== See also ==
- Hang Hau
