= Gourmet (supermarket) =

Supermarket in Hong Kong

- Company type: Privately owned company
- Industry: Supermarket
- Founded: 2005
- Headquarters: Hong Kong
- Area served: Hong Kong
- Key people: Mr. Li Ka-shing; Mr. Canning Fok
- Parent: AS Watson
- Website: Gourmet

Gourmet is a supermarket in Hong Kong owned by AS Watson, a wholly owned subsidiary of Hutchison Whampoa Limited. Its main customers are middle-class families. Its retail products are similar to those in ParknShop and Taste.

There are now stores in the basement level of Lee Tung Avenue, at 88 Caine Road, and in Lab Concept in Admiralty. There was a branch in the Leighton Centre from January 2012 to 2018, and a branch in Lee Gardens from 2005 to 28 February 2011.

== See others ==
- Park'n Shop
- Taste (supermarket)
- Great (supermarket)
