= Tak Ming (constituency) =

Constituency of the Sai Kung District Council of Hong Kong

- Elected constituency for the Sai Kung District Council
- Boundary of Tak Ming in Sai Kung District
- District: Sai Kung
- Legislative Council constituency: New Territories South East
- Population: 18,785 (2019)
- Electorate: 13,048 (2019)

Current constituency
- Created: 2003
- Number of members: One
- Member: Vacant

Tak Ming (Chinese: 德明) is one of the 29 constituencies in the Sai Kung District.

The constituency returns one district councillor to the Sai Kung District Council, with an election every four years.

Tak Ming constituency is loosely based on Hin Ming Court, Maritime Bay, Ming Tak Estate, Wo Ming Court and Yuk Ming Court in Tseung Kwan O with an estimated population of 18,785.

== Councillors represented ==
Election	Member	Party
2003	Wan Yuet-cheung	Civil Force
2014	Wan Yuet-cheung	NPP/CF
2019	Cheng Chung-man→Vacant	Independent democrat

== Election results ==
=== 2010s ===
Sai Kung District Council Election, 2019: Tak Ming
Party	Candidate	Votes	%	±%
Ind. democrat	Cheng Chung-man	5,420	56.24	
NPP (Civil Force)	Chan Chi-ho	4,217	43.76	
Majority		1,203	12.48	
Turnout		9,684	74.25	
Ind. democrat gain from NPP		Swing		
