= Hopewell Centre (Hong Kong) =

Building in Wan Chai, Hong Kong

- 合和中心
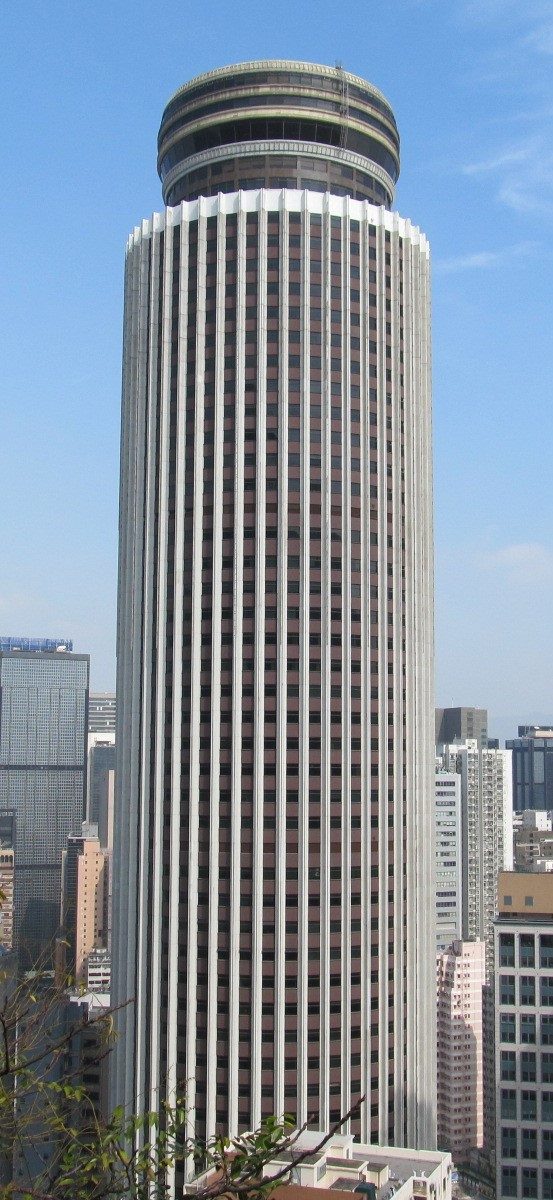
- Hopewell Centre in 2012
- Interactive map of the Hopewell Centre area

General information
- Status: Completed
- Type: Commercial offices
- Location: 183 Queen's Road East, Wan Chai, Hong Kong
- Coordinates: 22°16′28.25″N 114°10′17.76″E
- Construction started: 1977; 49 years ago
- Completed: 1980; 46 years ago

Height
- Roof: 222 m (728.3 ft)

Technical details
- Floor count: 64
- Floor area: 111,000 m^{2} (1,190,000 sq ft)

Design and construction
- Architects: Gordon Wu, WMKY Limited
- Structural engineer: Ove Arup & Partners

Hopewell Centre
- Traditional Chinese: 合和中心
Transcriptions
Yue: Cantonese
- Yale Romanization: Hahp wòh jūng sām
- Jyutping: Hap6 wo4 zung1 sam1

Hopewell Centre (Chinese: 合和中心) is a 222-metre (728-foot), 64-storey skyscraper at 183 Queen's Road East, in Wan Chai, Hong Kong Island in Hong Kong. The tower is the first circular skyscraper in Hong Kong. It is named after Hong Kong–listed property firm Hopewell Holdings Limited, which constructed the building. Hopewell Holdings Limited's headquarters are in the building and its chief executive officer, Gordon Wu, has his office on the top floor.

== Description ==
Construction started in 1977 and was completed in 1980. Upon completion, Hopewell Centre surpassed Jardine House as Hong Kong's tallest building. It was also the second tallest building in Asia at the time. It kept its title in Hong Kong until 1989, when the Bank of China Tower was completed. The building is now the 20th tallest building in Hong Kong.

The building has a circular floor plan. Although the front entrance is on the 'ground floor', commuters are taken through a set of escalators to the 3rd floor lift lobby. Hopewell Centre stands on the slope of a hill so steep that the building has its back entrance on the 17th floor towards Kennedy Road. There is a circular private swimming pool on the roof of the building built for feng shui reasons because people thought the building resembled a cigarette.

A revolving restaurant located on the 62nd floor, called "Revolving 66", overlooks other tall buildings below and the harbour. It was originally called Revolving 62, but soon changed its name as locals kept calling it Revolving 66. It completes a 360-degree rotation each hour. Passengers take either office lifts (faster) or the scenic lifts (with a view) to the 56/F, where they transfer to smaller lifts up to the 62/F. The restaurant is now named The Grand Buffet.

The building comprises several groups of lifts. Lobbies are on the 3rd and 17th floor, and are connected to Queen's Road East and Kennedy Road respectively. A mini-skylobby is on the 56th floor and serves as a transfer floor for diners heading to the 60/F and 62/F restaurants. The building's white 'bumps' between the windows have built in window-washer guide rails.

It is connected to the Hopewell Mall, which was opened on 1 November 2024.

== Privatisation ==
Hopewell shares shot up 31 per cent at one point, after the developer unveiled a privatisation plan worth HK$21.26 billion. The company was privatised in 2019 and its stock ticker 54 was removed from the exchange.

== Floors ==
- Basement: Taste Supermarket (Whole Floor)
- Ground floor: Stores, Taste Supermarket (Portion), Queen's Road East Entrance
- Floor 2: Stores
- Floor 3: Stores, lift lobby to office buildings
- Floors 4–5: Car park for trucks (with the entrance located on Spring Garden Lane)
- Floors 6–8: Chinese Restaurant, used to be the Hopewell City Restaurant, operated by Hopewell Holdings. The restaurant closed in September 2000 and is now leased to other food catering groups)
- Floors 9–15 (no 13th floor): Car park (with the entrance located in the Kennedy Road lobby (17th floor))
- Floors 16, 18–31, 33–44, 46–57, 59–60, 63, and 64: Office
- 17th floor: Stores, Polestar Space Hong Kong, Kennedy Road Entrance, lift and sightseeing lift lobby
- 17th, 17M Floor and 46th Floor: Computershare
- 18th Floor: Hong Kong Deposit Protection Board (Room 1802-10)
- 25th Floor: Consulate General of Poland in Hong Kong (Room 2506), Consulate General of Mexico in Hong Kong (Room 2507-09), Lau & Ngan, Solicitors LLP (Room 2504-5)
- 32nd, 45th and 58th floors: Refuge Floor
- 33rd Floor: FCL Group, Fotocine Advertising Ltd, WestcomZivo, iPrinciple, Tung Fang Mei Enterprise Co., Ltd., WMKY Ltd (Architects - Engineers)
- 34th Floor: Environmental Protection Department
- 35th Floor: Small Offices
- 36th Floor: FWD Group
- 37th Floor: Hong Kong Insurance Agency Co., Ltd., Hexin Insurance and Reinsurance Consultants Co., Ltd., First Direct Holdings Ltd., IT People Limited, Hong Kong Chamber of Commerce of Listed Companies
- 44th Floor: Hong Kong Council on Smoking and Health (Room 4402-03)
- 54th Floor: Blue Cross (Asia Pacific) Insurance Limited
- 57th Floor: MetLife
- 61st Floor: Kitchen of The Grand Buffet
- 62nd Floor: The Grand Buffet by Lisboa Food & Wines Ltd.
- Floors 59, 60, 63 and 64: Hopewell Holdings Limited Offices (Hopewell Holdings Limited, Hopewell Real Estate Agency Limited, Hopewell Hong Kong Properties Limited), Honorary Consulate of Croatia in Hong Kong

Note 1: To get there, people going to floors 59, 60, 62-64 must transfer to different lifts on floor 56.
Note 2: The building has two cargo lifts serving floors 2–58 and 61.

== Access ==
- MTR Wan Chai station Exit D, followed by a 5-minute walk south through Lee Tung Avenue.
- Bus - Routes 1P, 6, 6A, 6X, 10, 15, 24A, 24M, 56, 56A, 56B, 66, 90C, 109, 113, A17 all stop at Hopewell Centre.

== In media ==
This skyscraper was the filming location for R&B group Dru Hill's music video for "How Deep Is Your Love," directed by Brett Ratner, who also directed the movie Rush Hour, whose soundtrack features the song. The circular private swimming pool is well visible in this music video. This swimming pool has also featured in an Australian television advertisement by one of that country's major gaming companies, Tattersall's Limited, promoting a weekly lottery competition.

The skyscraper was also featured on the cover of post-hardcore band Fugazi's 1998 album End Hits.

== Gallery ==
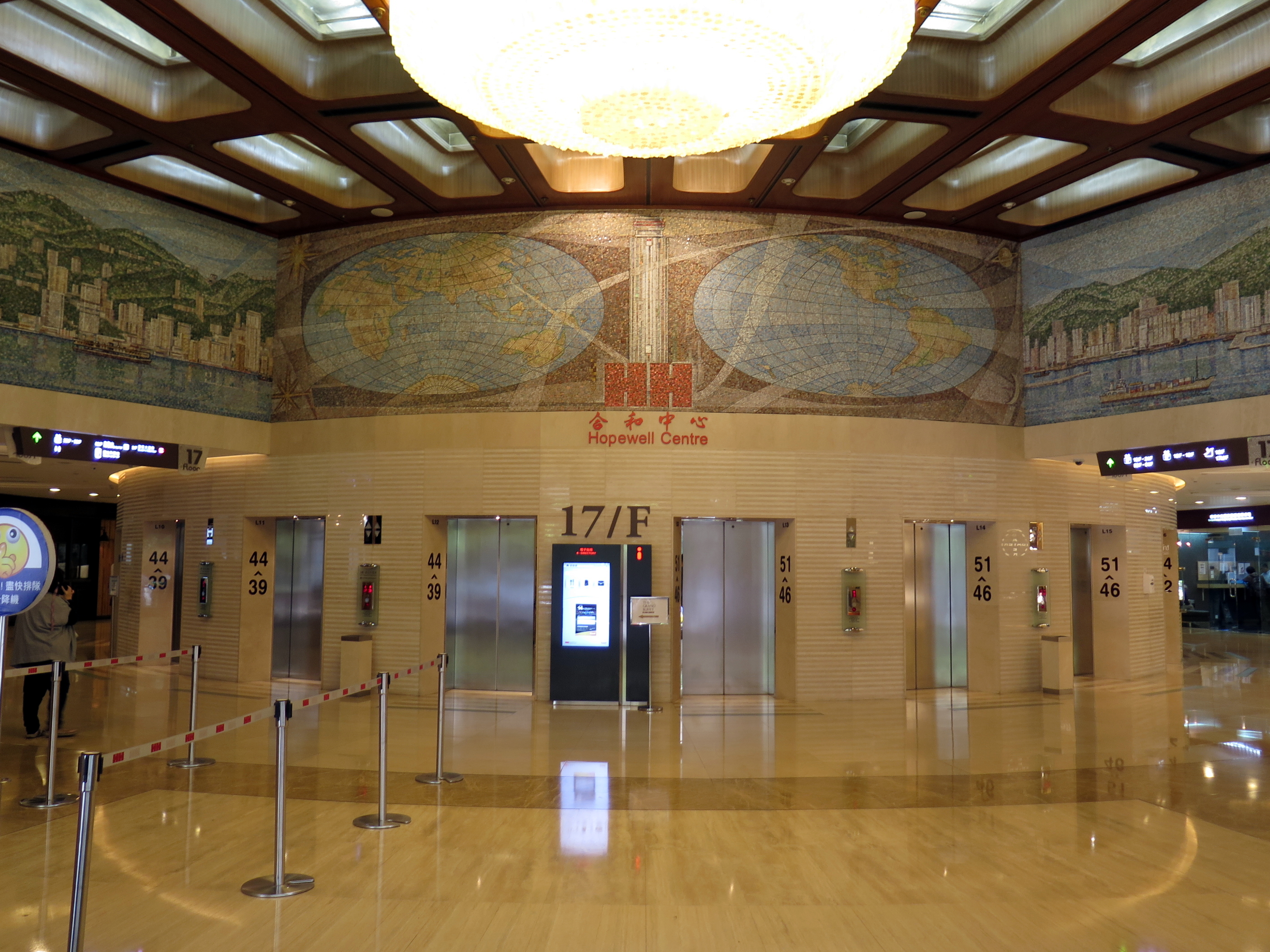
Hopewell Centre Lobby at 17/F

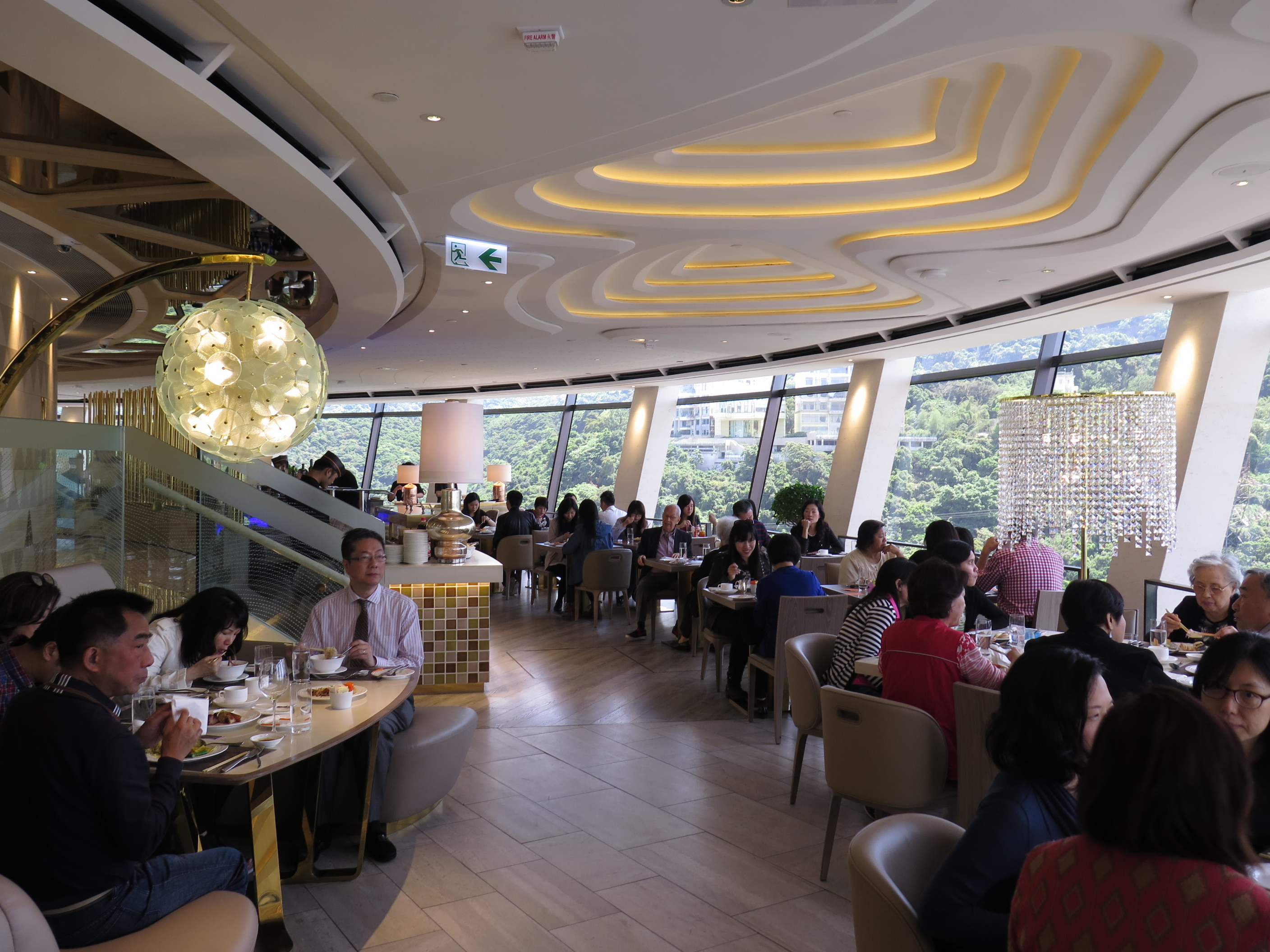
The Grand Buffet Restaurant at 62/F

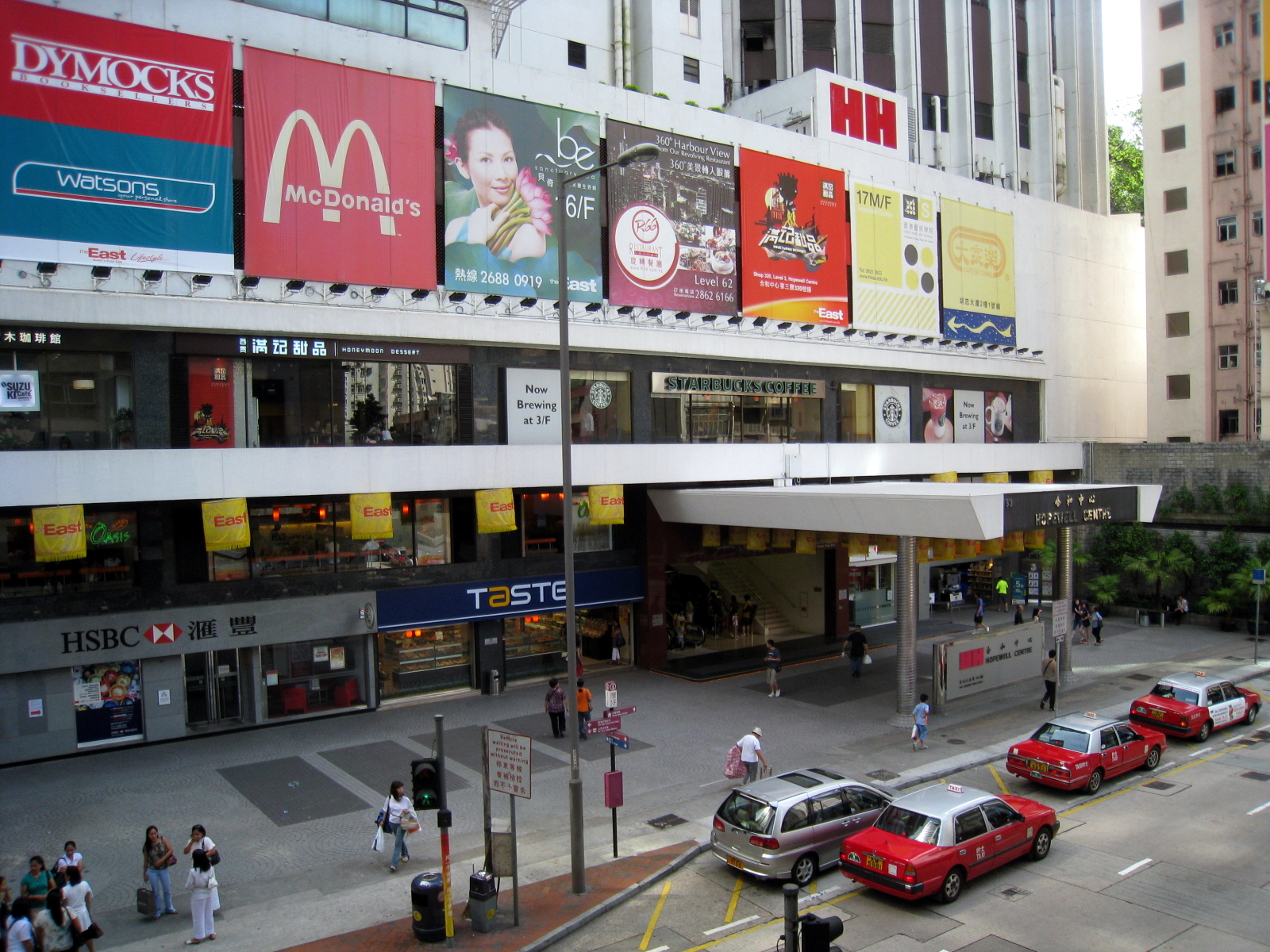
Hopewell Centre front entrance at street level

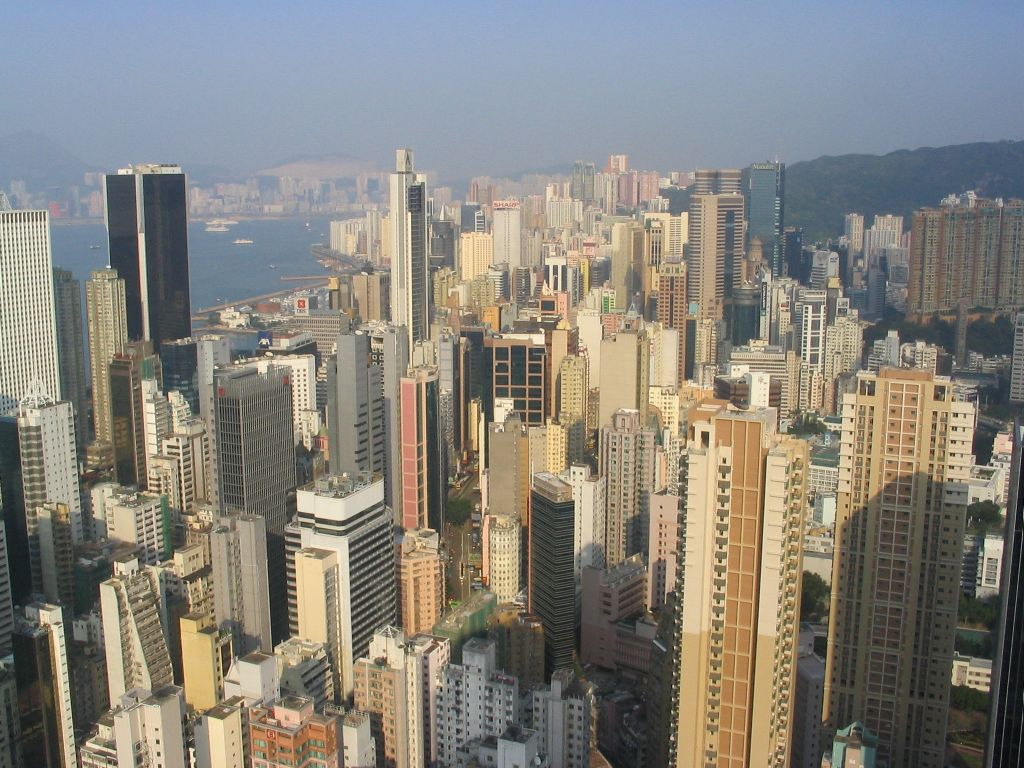
View of Wan Chai from Hopewell Centre in November 2006

== See also ==
- List of tallest buildings in Hong Kong
- List of buildings and structures in Hong Kong
- List of tallest buildings
- List of buildings
