= Kengkou station =

Kengkou Station may refer to:

- Kengkou metro station, a station on the Taoyuan Metro in Taoyuan, Taiwan.
- Kengkou station (Guangzhou Metro), a station on the Guangzhou Metro in Guangzhou, Guangdong, China.

== See also ==
- Hang Hau station of the Hong Kong MTR, with a name in Chinese identical to that of the above Kengkou stations
