= Hang Hau =

Residential area in Hong Kong

Coordinates: 22°19′N 114°16′E

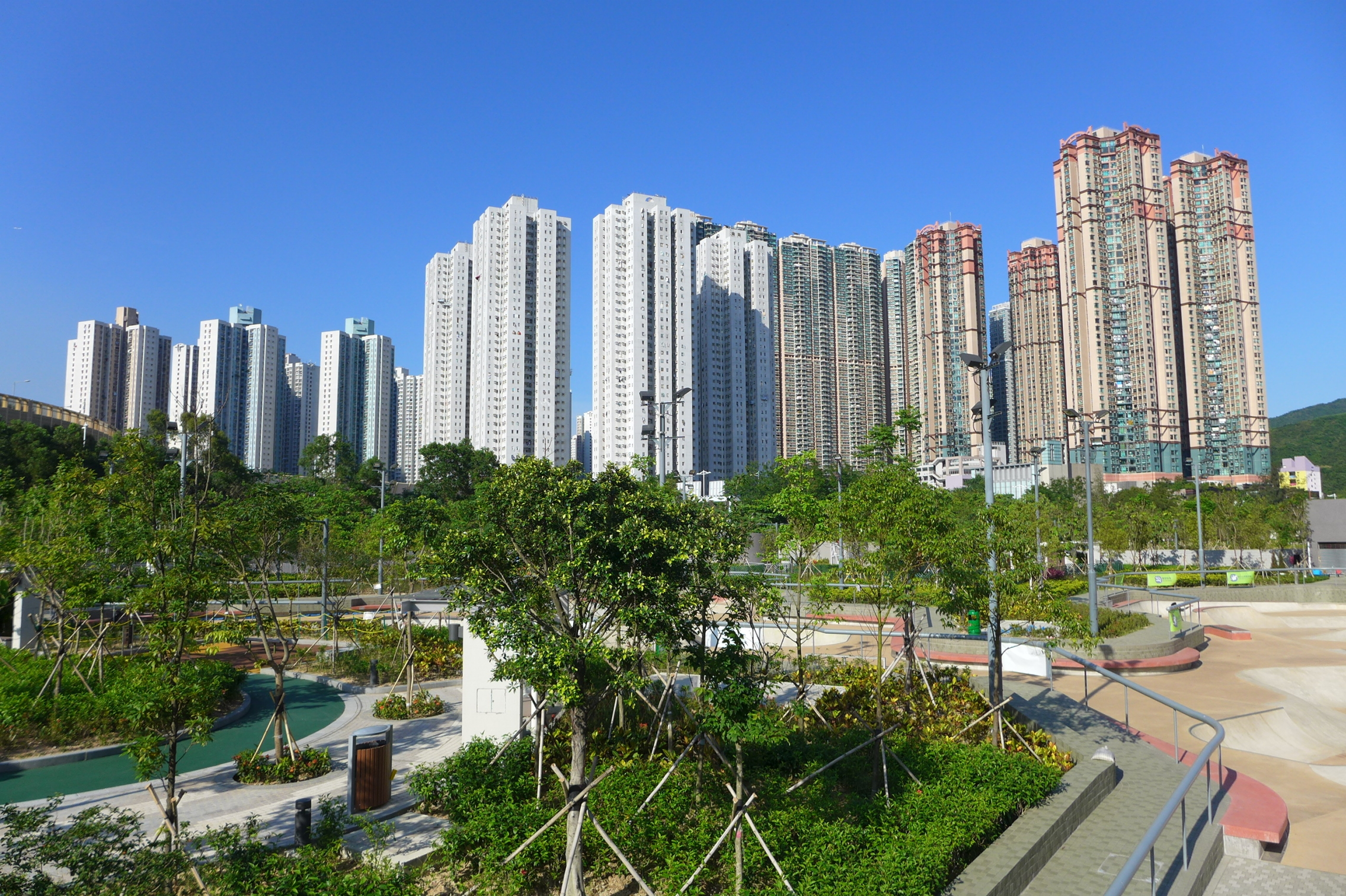
- Traditional Chinese: 坑口
Transcriptions
Standard Mandarin
- Hanyu Pinyin: keng1 kou3
Yue: Cantonese
- Jyutping: haang1 hau2

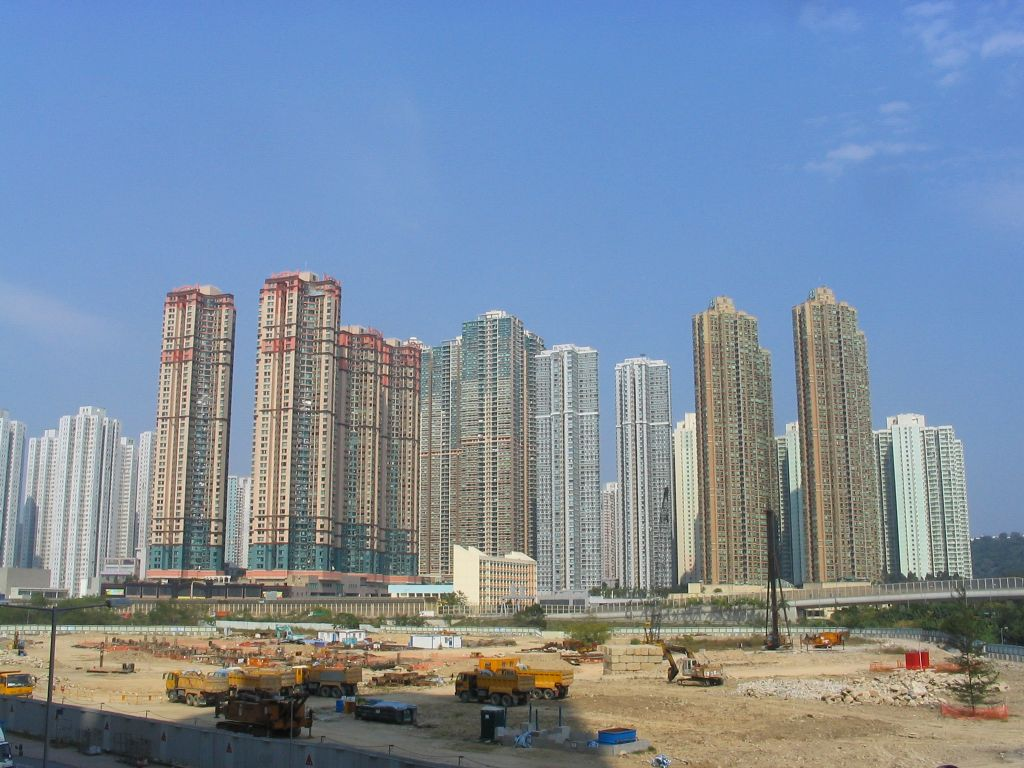
Hang Hau

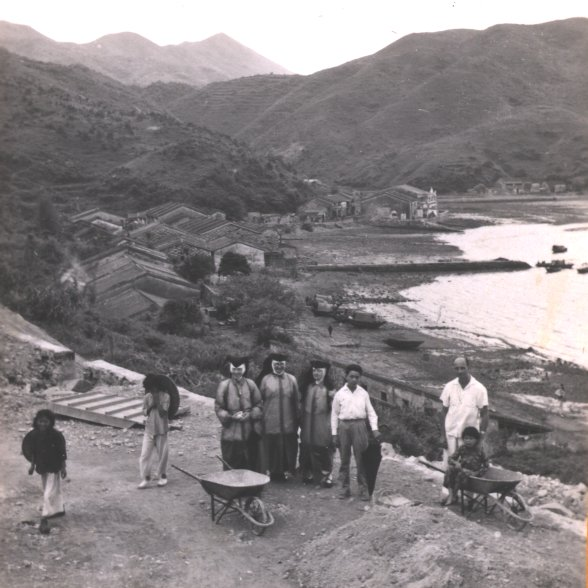
Hang Hau in 1950s

Hang Hau (Chinese: 坑口) is a residential area in Tseung Kwan O, Sai Kung, New Territories, Hong Kong. It is located at the eastern edge of the Tseung Kwan O New Town. Most of the land was reclaimed from Hang Hau Village and Shui Bin Village (水邊村).

== History ==
The earliest history referring to Hang Hau was in the 19th century. It was an agricultural and fishing village. Hang Hau got its name from a large water channel near Mang Kung Uk (孟公屋) that led to the sea. In days gone by, Hang Hau was on the sea front, facing Junk Bay. Many of the village names in Hang Hau reflect this – Shui Bin Village (水邊村) means Waterside Village, for example.

On 2 October 1957, Hang Hau Rural Committee was established. The rural committee was to serve the indigenous inhabitants in Hang Hau Village, Shui Bin Village, Tin Ha Wan Village, Yau Yue Wan Village, Tseng Lan Shue, Tai Po Tsai, Mang Kung Uk and Po Toi O.

Between the 1960s and 1980s, Hang Hau was a large ship scrapyard area. Since there was a ferry from Junk Bay to Island East Hong Kong, Hong Kong Oxygen Company started building factories in Hang Hau. Manufacturing business and trading services were established.

Long before the development of Tseung Kwan O New Town, Hang Hau was near settlements such as Hang Hau Village, Boon Kin Village and Tin Ha Wan Village. Most of the Villages were relocated at the current site near the Tseung Kwan O Hospital, which were moved after the new town's development. Now, about two-thirds of Hang Hau is on reclaimed land, and the sea is far away.

== Housing ==
Indigenous three storey village houses still can be found in the eastern edge of Hang Hau. Nowadays, Hang Hau is fully built-out with private and public estates owing to the development of Tseung Kwan O New Town.

=== Villages ===
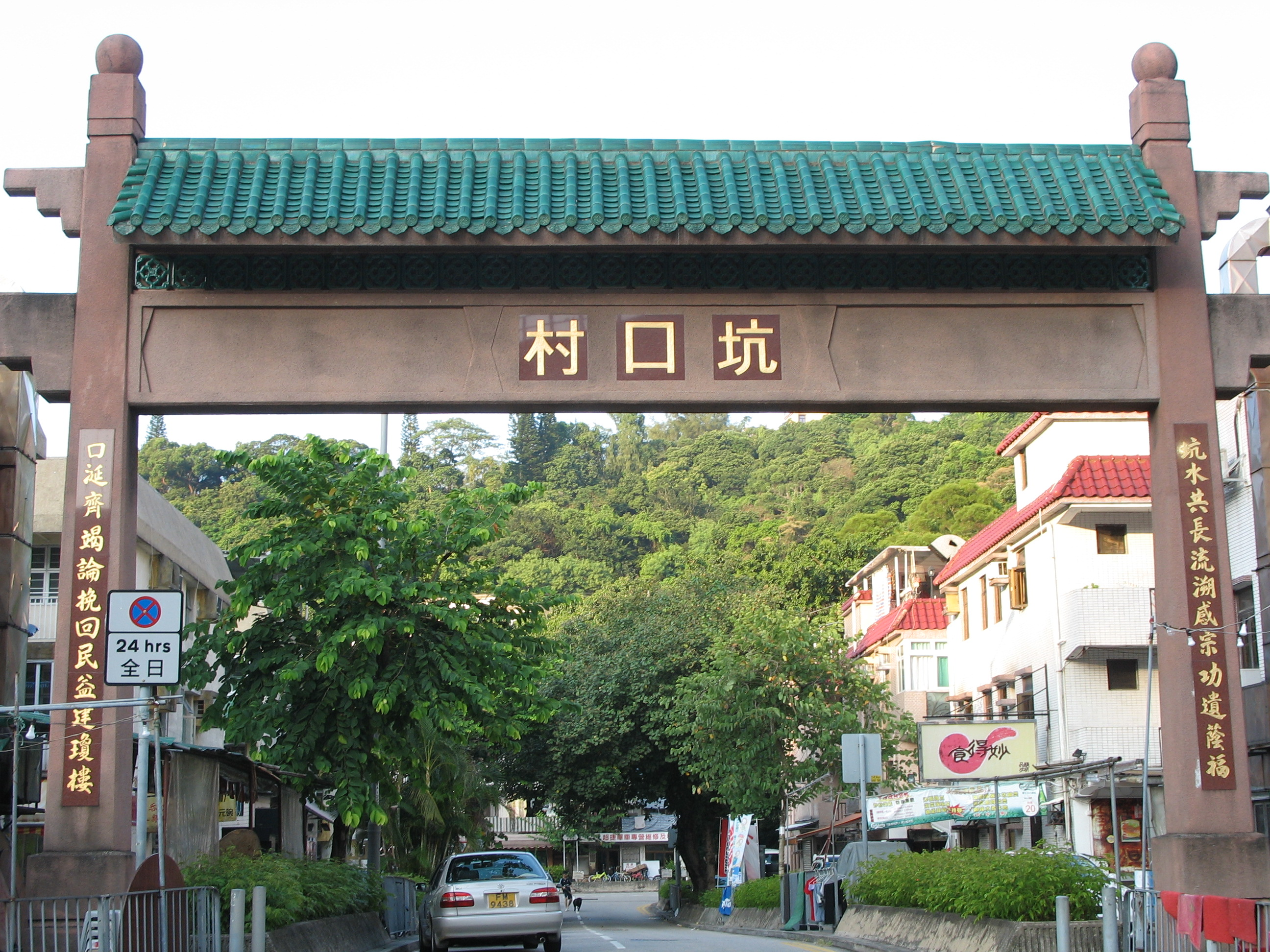
Hang Hau Village

- Boon Kin Village
- Hang Hau Village
- Shui Bin Village
- Tin Ha Wan Village

=== Home Ownership Scheme Estates ===
- Chung Ming Court
- Hin Ming Court
- Wo Ming Court
- Yu Ming Court
- Yuk Ming Court

=== Private Sector Participation Scheme (PSPS) Estates ===
- Fu Ning Garden
- Jolly Place
- On Ning Garden

=== Public Estates ===
- Hau Tak Estate
- Ming Tak Estate

=== Private Estates ===
- East Point City
- Maritime Bay
- Residence Oasis
- La Cite Noble
- Nan Fung Plaza

== Infrastructures ==
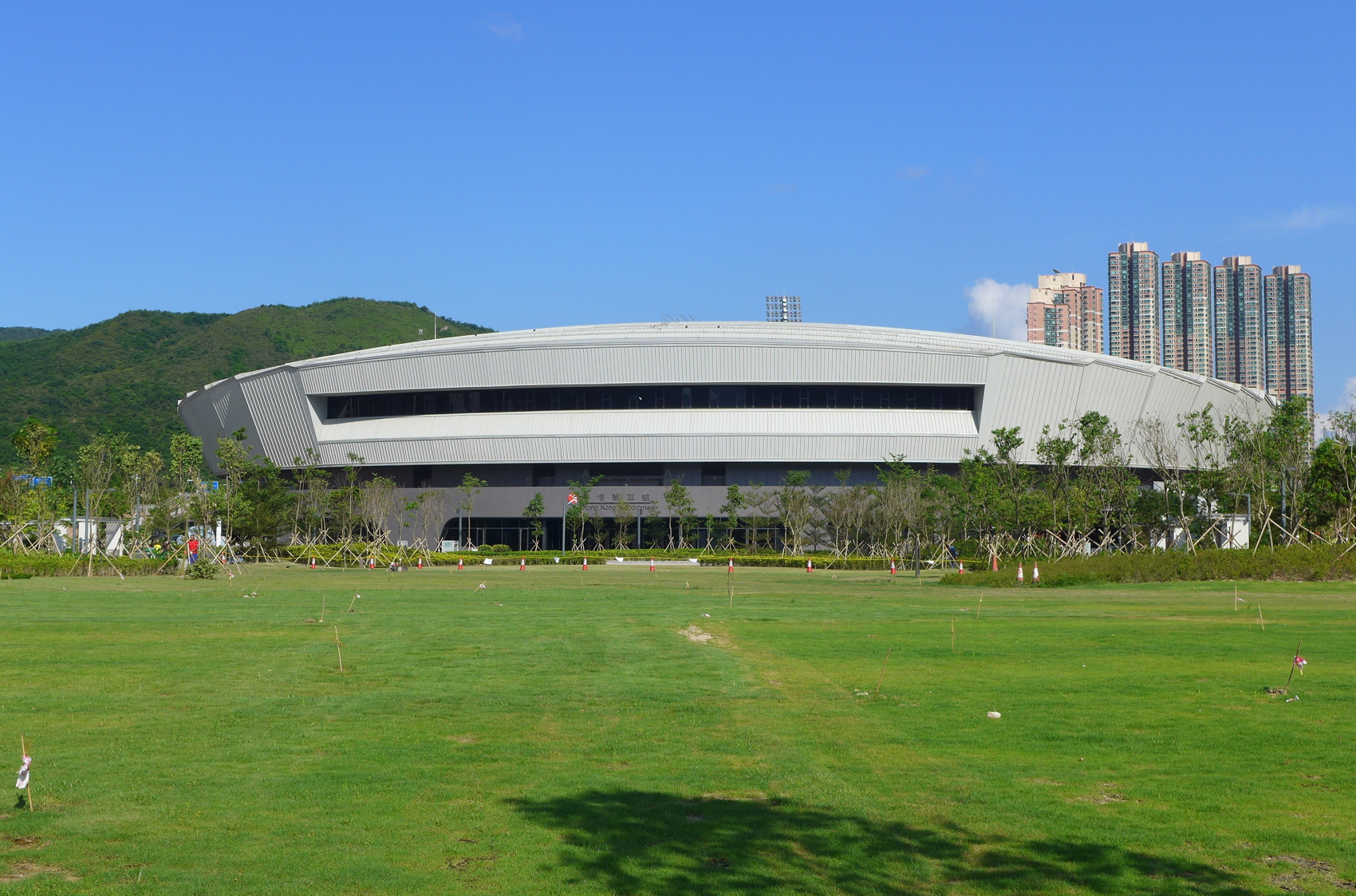
Hong Kong Velodrome.

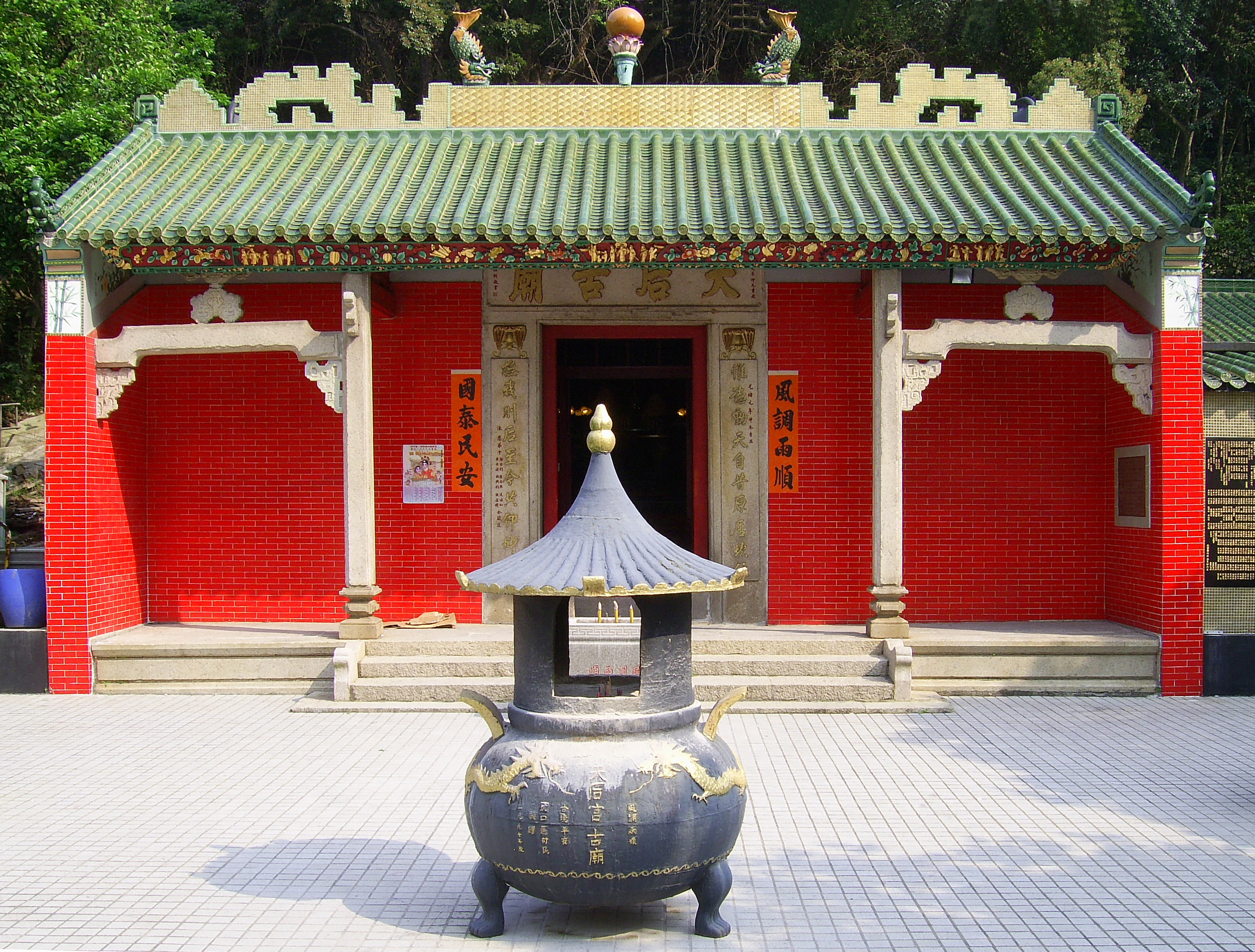
Hang Hau Tin Hau Temple.

=== Civil Facilities ===
- Po Ning Road General Outpatient Clinic
- Sai Kung Tseung Kwan O Government Complex
- Tseung Kwan O Hospital

=== Recreations ===
- Hang Hau Sports Centre
- Hang Hau Man Kuk Lane Park
- Tseung Kwan O Sports Ground
- Hong Kong Velodrome

=== Shopping Malls ===
- East Point City
- TKO Gateway (formerly Hau Tak Shopping Centre)
- Nan Fung Plaza
- The Lane (MTR Malls)
- La Cite Noble
- Maritime Bay

=== Temple ===
- Hang Hau Tin Hau Temple

=== Church ===
- St Andrew's Church

== Institutes ==
=== Primary schools ===
- Assembly of God Leung Sing Tak Primary School
- PLK Fung Ching Memorial Primary School
- Tseung Kwan O Government Primary School
- Yan Chai Hospital Chan Iu Seng Primary School

=== Secondary schools ===
- Catholic Ming Yuen Secondary School
- H.K.M.L.C. Queen Maud Secondary School
- PLK Ho Yuk Ching (1984) College

== Transport ==
Prior to the development of Tseung Kwan O New Town, one may drive to Hang Hau via Clear Water Bay Road and Hang Hau Road. Later, when Tseung Kwan O was developed into a new town, Po Lam Road was extended into Hang Hau, providing a road link to Sau Mau Ping.

Public transport in Hang Hau is served by the MTRC, Kowloon Motor Bus (KMB), and also Citybus. KMB operates routes to Kowloon, Tsuen Wan, and some inner-district routes. Citybus mainly runs routes to Hong Kong International Airport, Hong Kong Island, Sai Kung Town and Shatin. Hang Hau Station, located near Residence Oasis and a major bus terminus, also provides Tseung Kwan O Line train services.

== See also ==
- Hang Hau station
- Tseung Kwan O
- Tseung Kwan O New Town
- Sai Kung District
