= Pak Shing Kok station =

Coordinates: 22.3062955°N 114.2722743°E

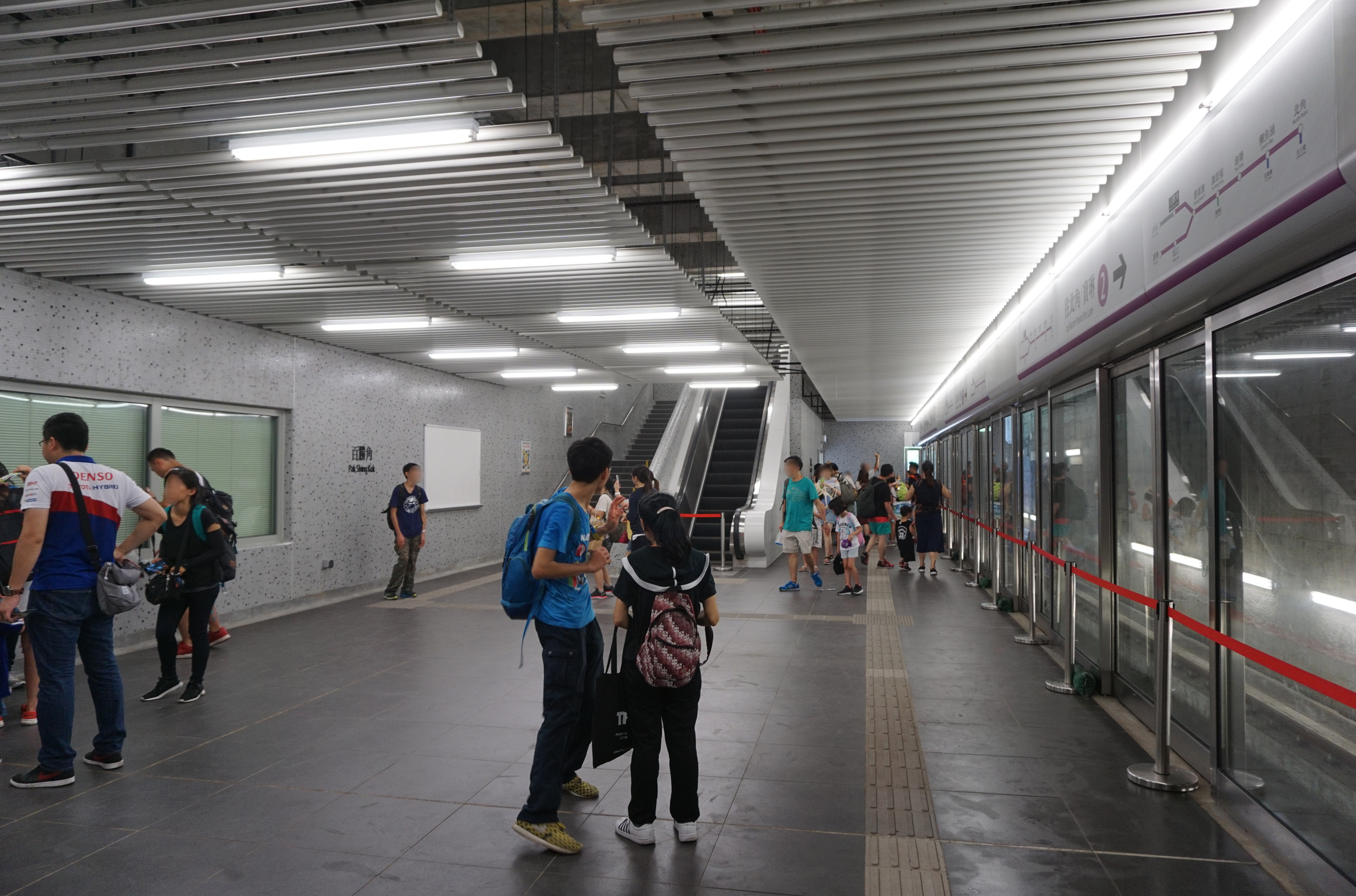
Platform of the mockup station in the Hong Kong Fire and Ambulance Services Academy

Pak Shing Kok (Chinese: 百勝角站) was a proposed MTR station on the Tseung Kwan O Line between Tseung Kwan O station and LOHAS Park station in Pak Shing Kok, Tseung Kwan O, Sai Kung District, New Territories, Hong Kong. It was to serve low to medium-density residential buildings in Pak Shing Kok. However, construction was cancelled due to inadequate population at the location.

The Hong Kong Fire and Ambulance Services Academy includes a mockup of an MTR station named Pak Shing Kok, which was opened in 2018. It is used to train firemen in tackling incidents on the MTR system.
