= Sheung Tak Estate =

Public housing estate in Tseung Kwan O, Hong Kong

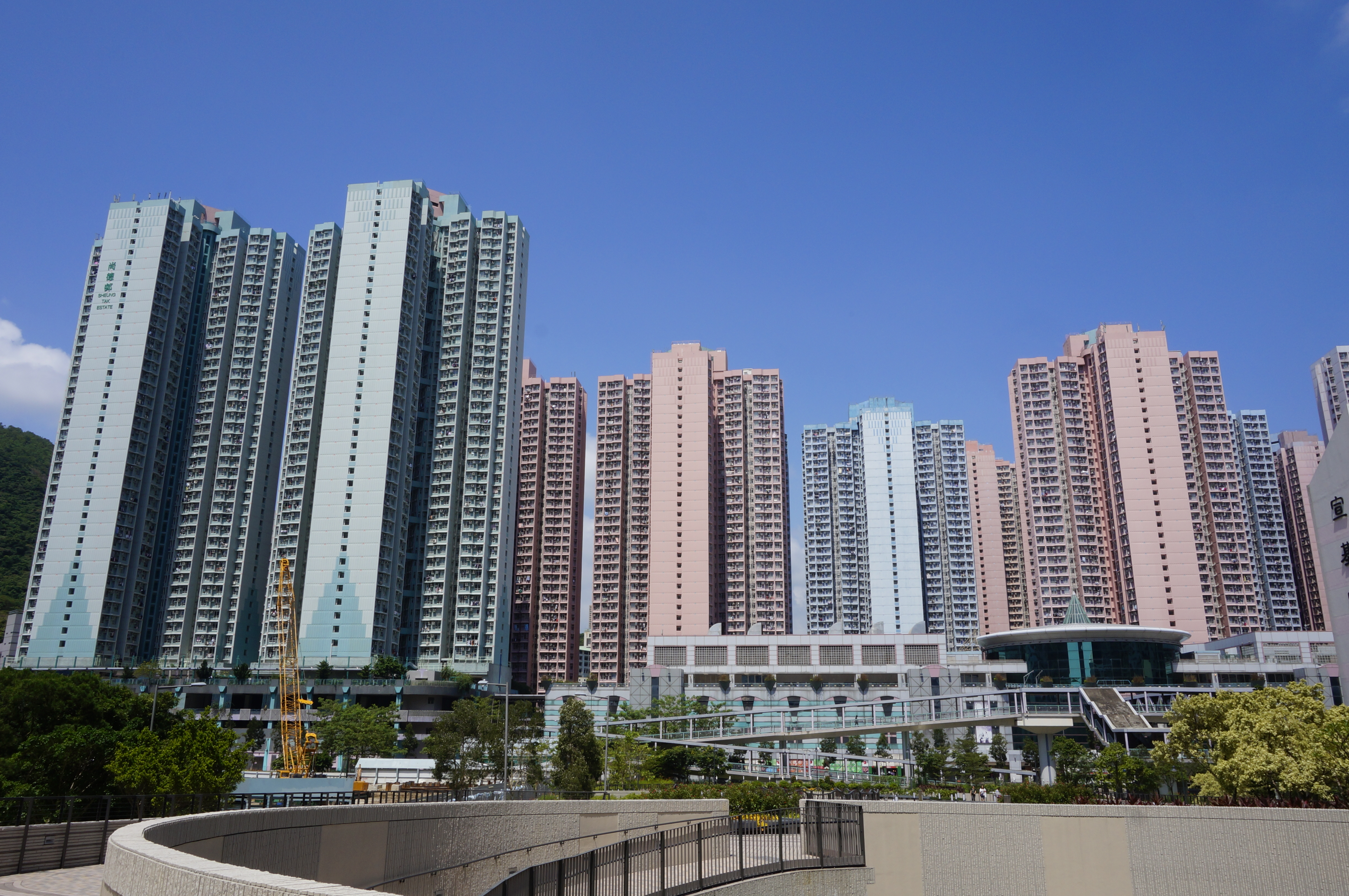
- Sheung Tak Estate
- Interactive map of Sheung Tak Estate

General information
- Location: 2 Tong Ming Street, Tseung Kwan O New Territories, Hong Kong
- Coordinates: 22.311532°N 114.259321°E
- Status: Completed
- Category: Public rental housing
- Population: 18,750 (2016)
- No. of blocks: 9
- No. of units: 5,561

Construction
- Constructed: 1998; 28 years ago
- Authority: Hong Kong Housing Authority

Sheung Tak Estate (Chinese: 尚德邨) is a public housing estate in Tseung Kwan O, New Territories, Hong Kong, near Hong Kong Velodrome and Haven of Hope Hospital. It is the sixth public housing estate in Tseung Kwan O and comprises 9 blocks of Harmony I and Small Household Block styles built in 1998 and 2002 respectively.

Kwong Ming Court (廣明苑), Po Ming Court (寶明苑) and Tong Ming Court (唐明苑) are Home Ownership Scheme housing courts in Tseung Kwan O near Sheung Tak Estate, built between 1998 and 1999.

== Houses ==
=== Sheung Tak Estate ===
Name	Chinese name	Building type	Completed
Sheung Nim House	尚廉樓	Senior Citizens	1998
Sheung Chun House	尚真樓	Harmony 1 Option 5 (3 Gen.)	1998
Sheung Yan House	尚仁樓	Harmony 1 Option 5 (3 Gen.)	1998
Sheung Yee House	尚義樓	Harmony 1 Option 5 with New Harmony Annex 2 (3 Gen.)	1998
Sheung Chi House	尚智樓	Harmony 1 Option 10 (3 Gen.)	1998
Sheung Ming House	尚明樓	Harmony 1 Option 10 (3 Gen.)	1998
Sheung Shun House	尚信樓	Harmony 1 Option 10 (3 Gen.)	1998
Sheung Lai House	尚禮樓	Harmony 1 Option 10 (3 Gen.)	1998
Sheung Mei House	尚美樓	Small Household Block	2002

=== Kwong Ming Court ===
Name	Chinese name	Building type	Completed
Kwong Cheong House	廣昌閣	Harmony 1 Option 7 (3 Gen.)	1998
Kwong Lung House	廣隆閣	Harmony 1 Option 7 (3 Gen.)	1998
Kwong Yin House	廣賢閣	Harmony 1 Option 7 (3 Gen.)	1998
Kwong Sui House	廣瑞閣	Harmony 1 Option 7 (3 Gen.)	1998
Kwong Ying House	廣盈閣	Harmony 1 Option 7 (3 Gen.)	1998
Kwong Ning House	廣寧閣	Harmony 1 Option 7 (3 Gen.)	1998
Kwong Sun House	廣新閣	Harmony 1 Option 7 (3 Gen.)	1998

=== Po Ming Court ===
Name	Chinese name	Building type	Completed
Po Chung House	寶松閣	Harmony 1 Option 5 (3 Gen.)	1998
Po Pak House	寶柏閣	Harmony 1 Option 5 (3 Gen.)	1998

=== Tong Ming Court ===
Name	Chinese name	Building type	Completed
Tong Fai House	唐輝閣	Harmony 1 Option 7 (3.5 Gen.)	1999
Tong Wong House	唐煌閣	Harmony 1 Option 7 (3.5 Gen.)	1999
Tong Fu House	唐富閣	Harmony 1 Option 7 (3.5 Gen.)	1999

== Demographics ==
According to the 2016 by-census, Sheung Tak Estate had a population of 18,750, Kwong Ming Court had a population of 12,665, Po Ming Court had a population of 4,370 while Tong Ming Court had a population of 5,904. Altogether the population amounts to 41,689.

== Politics ==
For the 2019 District Council election, the estate fell within three constituencies. Sheung Tak Estate is located in the Sheung Tak constituency, which is represented by Lee Ka-yui, Kwong Ming Court and Po Ming Court are located in the Kwong Ming constituency, which is represented by Ricky Or Yiu-lam, while Tong Ming Court falls within the O Tong constituency, which was formerly represented by Lui Man-kwong until July 2021.

== See also ==
- Public housing estates in Tseung Kwan O
