= Kwong Ming (constituency) =

Constituency of the Sai Kung District Council of Hong Kong

- Elected constituency for the Sai Kung District Council
- Boundary of Kwong Ming in Sai Kung District
- District: Sai Kung
- Legislative Council constituency: New Territories South East
- Population: 17,828 (2019)
- Electorate: 12,482 (2019)

Current constituency
- Created: 1999
- Number of members: One
- Member: vacant

Kwong Ming (Chinese: 廣明) is one of the 29 constituencies in the Sai Kung District.

The constituency returns one district councillor to the Sai Kung District Council, with an election every four years.

Kwong Ming constituency is loosely based on Haven of Hope Hospital, Kwong Ming Court and Po Ming Court in Tseung Kwan O with estimated population of 17,828.

== Councillors represented ==
Election	Member	Party
1999	Anthony Wong Hing-wah	DAB
2003	Ricky Or Yiu-lam	Frontier
2008	Ricky Or Yiu-lam	Democratic
2011	Chong Yuen-tung	DAB
2019	Ricky Or Yiu-lam→Vacant	CGPLTKO
2021	Ricky Or Yiu-lam→Vacant	Independent

== Election results ==
=== 2010s ===
Sai Kung District Council Election, 2019: Kwong Ming
Party	Candidate	Votes	%	±%
Ind. democrat	Ricky Or Yiu-lam	5,240	56.80	
DAB	Chong Yuen-tung	3,985	43.20	
Majority		1,255	13.60	
Turnout		9,251	74.14	
Ind. democrat gain from DAB		Swing		
