= Sheung Tak (constituency) =

Constituency of the Sai Kung District Council of Hong Kong

- Elected constituency for the Sai Kung District Council
- Boundary of Sheung Tak in Sai Kung District
- District: Sai Kung
- Legislative Council constituency: New Territories South East
- Population: 19,061 (2019)
- Electorate: 13,402 (2019)

Current constituency
- Created: 1999
- Number of members: One
- Member: vacant

Sheung Tak (Chinese: 尚德) is one of the 29 constituencies of the Sai Kung District Council in Hong Kong. The seat elects one member of the council every four years.

Since its creation in 1999, the boundary of the constituency is loosely based on the area of Sheung Tak Estate in Tseung Kwan O.

== Councillors represented ==
Election	Member	Party
1999	Luk Wai-man	DAB
2011	Kan Siu-kei	FTU
2019	Lee Ka-yui→Vacant	CGPLTKO

== Election results ==
=== 2010s ===
Sai Kung District Council Election, 2019: Sheung Tak
Party	Candidate	Votes	%	±%
Ind. democrat	Lee Ka-yui	5,585	61.29	
FTU	Kan Siu-kei	3,527	38.71	−17.58
Majority		2,058	22.58	
Turnout		9,143	68.29	
Ind. democrat gain from FTU		Swing		

Sai Kung District Council Election, 2015: Sheung Tak
Party	Candidate	Votes	%	±%
FTU	Kan Siu-kei	2,978	56.29	+21.87
Nonpartisan	Wong Fai	1,662	31.42	+25.06
Independent	Choi Kin-ching	650	12.29	
Majority		1,316	24.87	
Turnout		5,290	43.08	
FTU hold		Swing		

Sai Kung District Council Election, 2011: Sheung Tak
Party	Candidate	Votes	%	±%
FTU	Kan Siu-kei	1,883	34.42	
Nonpartisan	Yip Chun-keung	1,545	28.24	
Neo Democrats	Mak Tsz-hei	1,004	18.35	
DAB	Luk Wai-man	650	11.88	−47.98
Nonpartisan	Wong Fai	348	6.36	
Majority		338	6.18	
Turnout		5,471	49.34	
FTU gain from DAB		Swing		

=== 2000s ===
Sai Kung District Council Election, 2007: Sheung Tak
Party	Candidate	Votes	%	±%
DAB	Luk Wai-man	1,782	59.86	−5.66
Democratic	Ho Wai-yee	758	25.46	−8.02
Majority		944	27.30	
DAB hold		Swing		

Sai Kung District Council Election, 2003: Sheung Tak
Party	Candidate	Votes	%	±%
DAB	Luk Wai-man	1,782	59.86	−5.66
Democratic	Ho Wai-yee	758	25.46	−8.02
Independent	Lin Leung-ying	437	14.68	
Majority		1,024	24.40	
DAB hold		Swing		

=== 1990s ===
Sai Kung District Council Election, 1999: Sheung Tak
Party	Candidate	Votes	%	±%
DAB	Luk Wai-man	570	65.52	
Democratic	Lam Lok-yin	300	34.48	
Majority		270	31.04	
DAB win (new seat)				
