= KEC =

KEC may refer to:

- Kaohsiung Exhibition Center, Taiwan
- Kathmandu Engineering College, Nepal
- KEC80, a weather radio station
- KEC International, a power company, Mumbai, India
- Kentucky Exposition Center, Louisville, US
- Kerala Congress, a political party in Kerala, India
- Kowloon East Cluster, hospital cluster under the Hospital Authority in Hong Kong
- Kress Events Center, an athletics facility in Green Bay, Wisconsin, US
