= Fire and Ambulance Services Academy =

Hong Kong firefighter and paramedic training facility

Coordinates: 22.3062955°N 114.2722743°E

- Traditional Chinese: 消防及救護學院
Transcriptions
Yue: Cantonese
- Yale Romanization: Sīu fòhng kahp gau wuh hohk yún
- Jyutping: Siu1 fong4 kap6 gau3 wu6 hok6 jun2

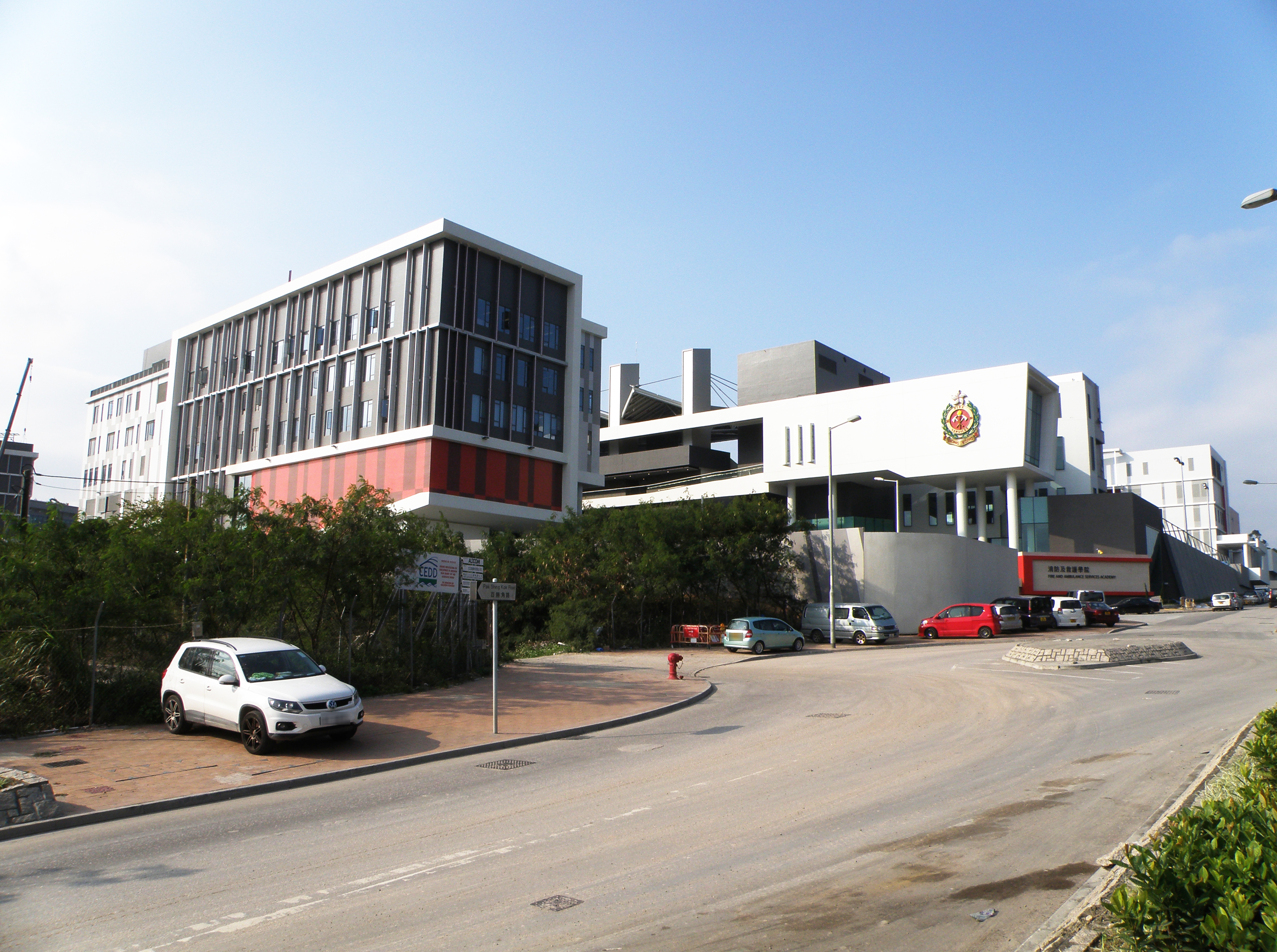
Fire and Ambulance Services Academy

The Fire and Ambulance Services Academy is a firefighter training facility owned and operated by the Hong Kong Fire Services Department. It is located in Pak Shing Kok, Tseung Kwan O, Hong Kong. It was opened on 16 March 2016.

It contains a mockup of an MTR train station named Pak Shing Kok.
