= Kowloon East Cluster =

Hospital cluster

- 九龍東醫院聯網
- Logo of the Kowloon East Cluster
- Region served: HK
- Services: Health care
- Cluster Chief Executive: Dr. Loletta So
- Parent organisation: Hospital Authority
- Staff: 6,483

Kowloon East Cluster (Chinese: 九龍東醫院聯網; KEC) is one of the six hospital clusters managed by Hospital Authority in Hong Kong. It consists of 3 public hospitals and 8 family medicine clinics (FMC) (formerly known as general outpatient clinics (GOPC) (Note: GOPCs have been officially renamed to FMCs in Oct 2025, see this press release)) to provide public healthcare services for the population of Kwun Tong and part of Sai Kung Districts (including Tseung Kwan O). In mid-2012, the population was 1,012,000. Its cluster chief executive as of June 2026 is Dr. Loletta So.

== Services ==
Kowloon East Cluster operates the following three hospitals of various capabilities to provide a range of acute, convalescent, rehabilitation, and infirmary inpatient and ambulatory care services to the public in the areas of Kwun Tong and part of Sai Kung Districts (including Tseung Kwan O). In mid-2012, the population of the areas was 1,012,000.

- Haven of Hope Hospital (HHH)
- Tseung Kwan O Hospital (TKOH)
- United Christian Hospital (UCH)

As of March 2013, the cluster has 2,371 in-patient beds and 6,483 full-time equivalent staff .
