= Haven of Hope Hospital =

- Hospital Authority and Haven of Hope Christian Service
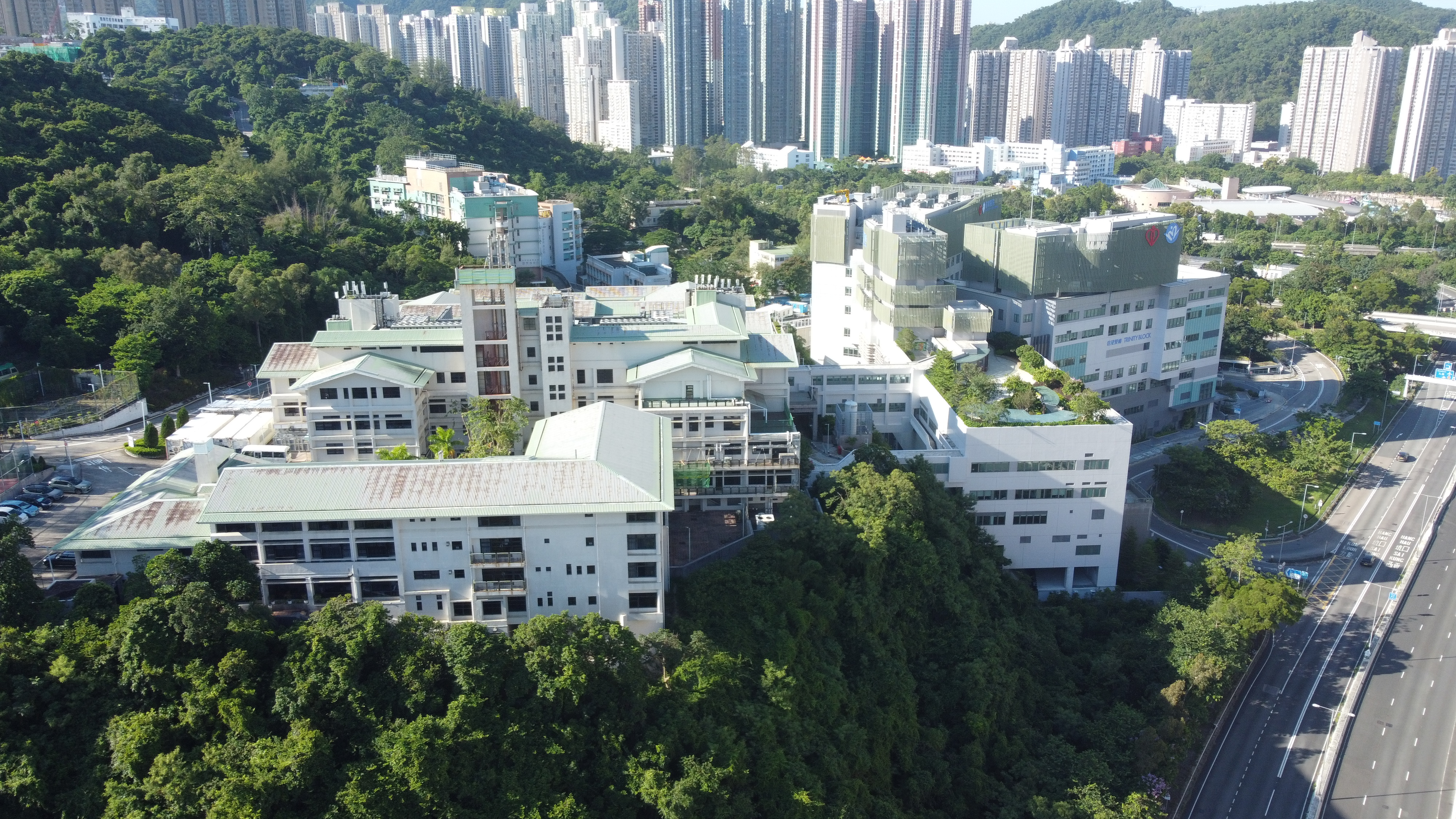
- Haven of Hope Hospital

- Location within Hong Kong

Geography
- Location: 8 Haven of Hope Road, Tseung Kwan O, Hong Kong
- Coordinates: 22°18′50″N 114°15′23″E

Organisation
- Type: Specialist
- Religious affiliation: Christian
- Network: Kowloon East Cluster

Services
- Emergency department: No Accident and Emergency, at Tseung Kwan O Hospital
- Speciality: Rehabilitation, Geriatric, Pulmonary and Palliative services

Helipads
- Helipad: No

History
- Founded: 1955; 71 years ago

Links
- Lists: Hospitals in Hong Kong

Haven of Hope Hospital (Chinese: 靈實醫院; Cantonese Yale: Lìhngsaht Yīyún; HHH), is a Rehabilitation hospital is located in Rennie's Mill, New Territories, Hong Kong, provides subacute medical care, comprehensive rehabilitation and long term care under the auspices of Haven of Hope Christian Service and the Hospital Authority. The hospital was founded by Norwegian missionary Annie Skau Berntsen in 1955.
