= Tseung Kwan O Hospital =

- Hospital Authority

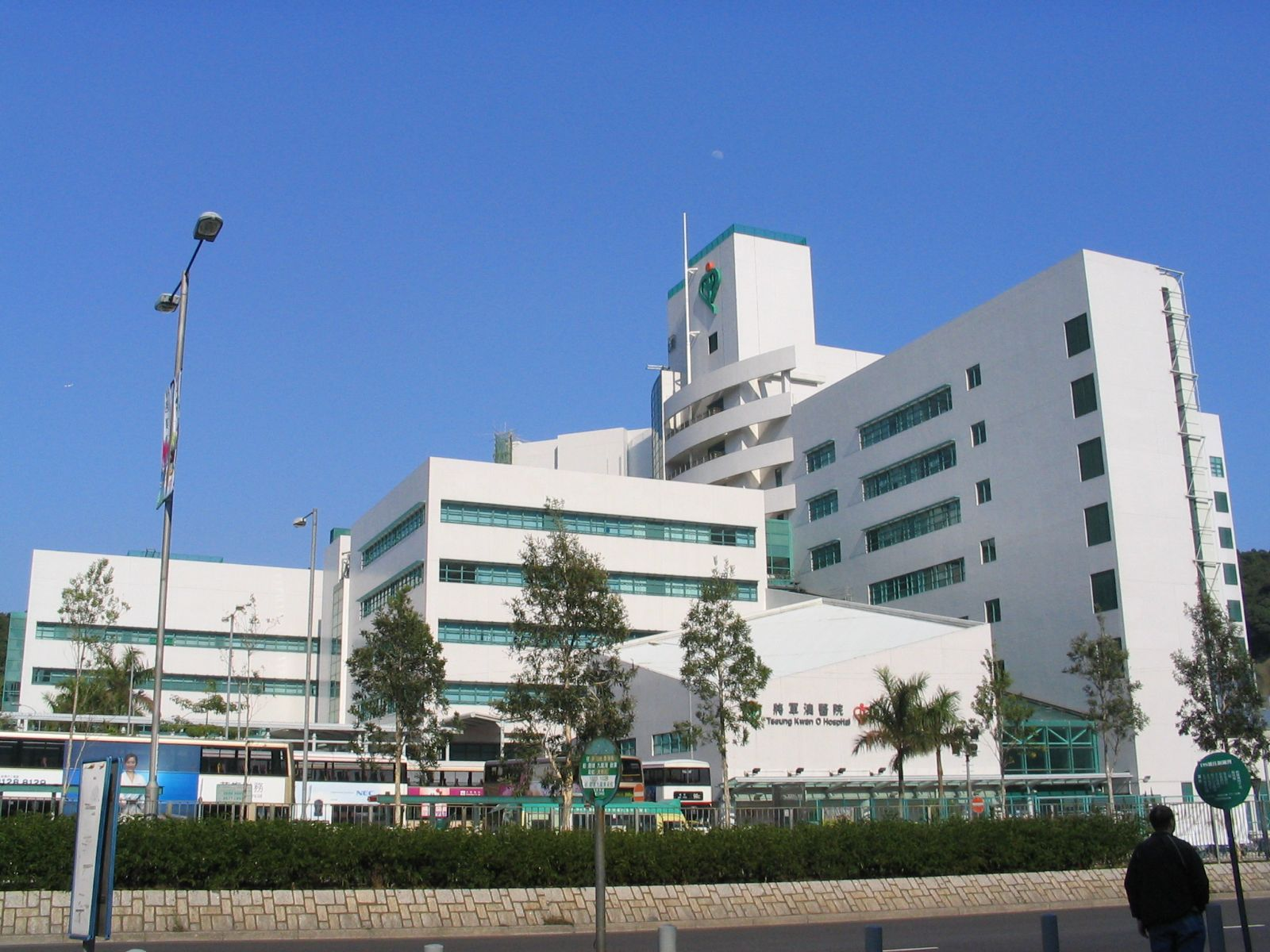
- Tseung Kwan O Hospital

- Location within Hong Kong

Geography
- Location: 2 Po Ning Lane, Hang Hau, Tseung Kwan O, Hong Kong
- Coordinates: 22°19′5″N 114°16′13″E

Organisation
- Type: District General
- Network: Kowloon East Cluster

Services
- Emergency department: Yes, Accident and Emergency
- Beds: 667

History
- Founded: 28 December 1999; 26 years ago

Links
- Lists: Hospitals in Hong Kong

Tseung Kwan O Hospital (Chinese: 將軍澳醫院; Cantonese Yale: Jēunggwān'ou Yīyún; TKOH), located in Hang Hau, Tseung Kwan O, Hong Kong, is a district general hospital providing secondary care services for the Sai Kung and Tseung Kwan O communities.

Tseung Kwan O Hospital has 667 beds, It opened in December 1999, It was part of Kowloon East Cluster.

== Services ==
=== Specialities ===
- 24 hour Emergency department
- Anaesthesiology and Operating Theatre Services
- Combined Endoscopy Unit
- Coronary Care Unit
- Ear, Nose and Throat
- Electrographic Diagnostic Unit
- Family Medicine & Primary Health Care
- Gynaecology (including Obstetrics out-patient services)
- High Dependency Unit
- Intensive Care Medicine
- Orthopaedics and Traumatology
- Ophthalmology (mainly on ophthalmology out-patient services)
- Paediatrics and Adolescent Medicine
- Pathology
- Radiology and MRI Centre
- Specialist Out-patient Department
- Surgery
