= Pak Shing Kok =

Area in Tseung Kwan O, Hong Kong

Coordinates: 22.306°N 114.274°E

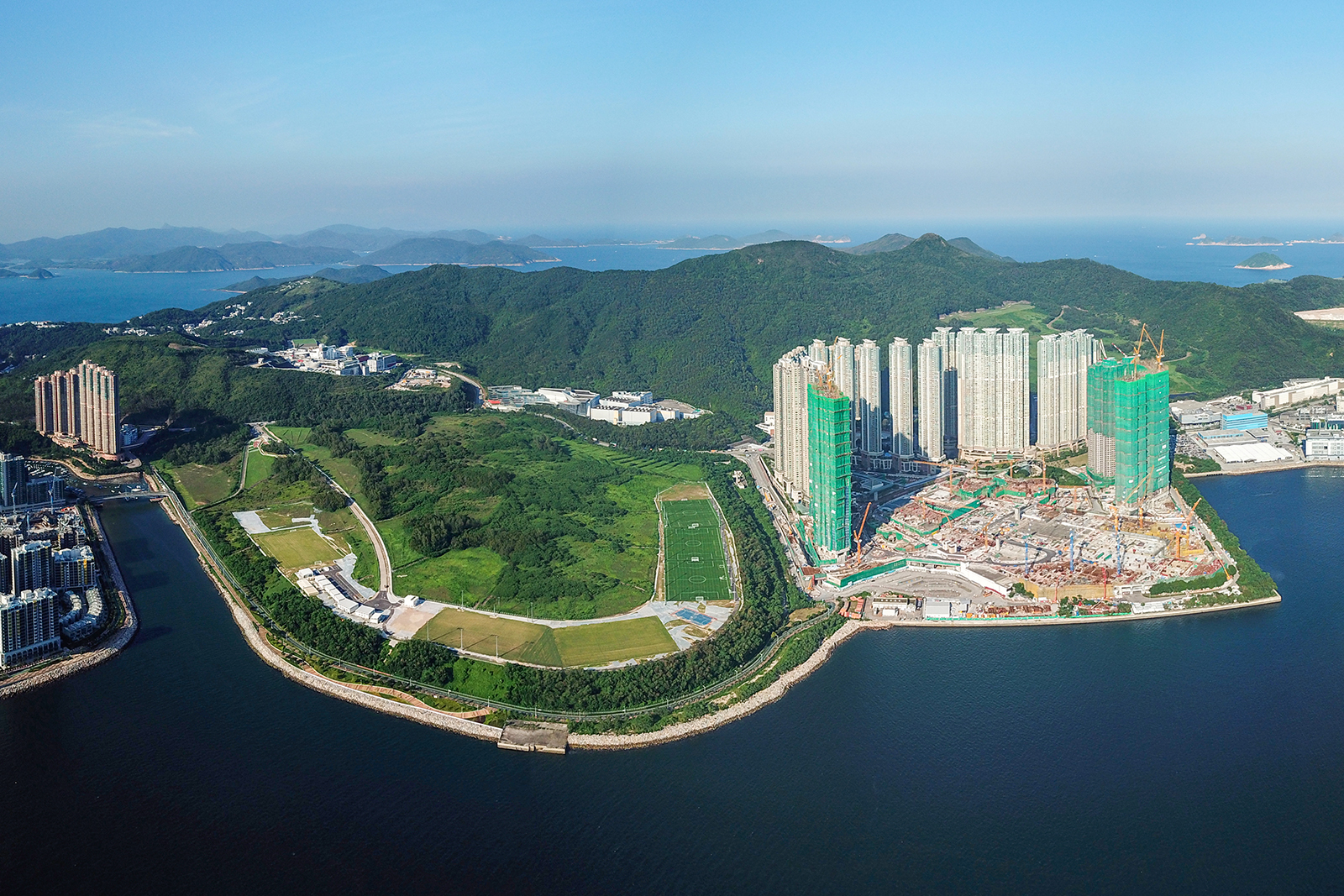
Pak Shing Kok in 2018.

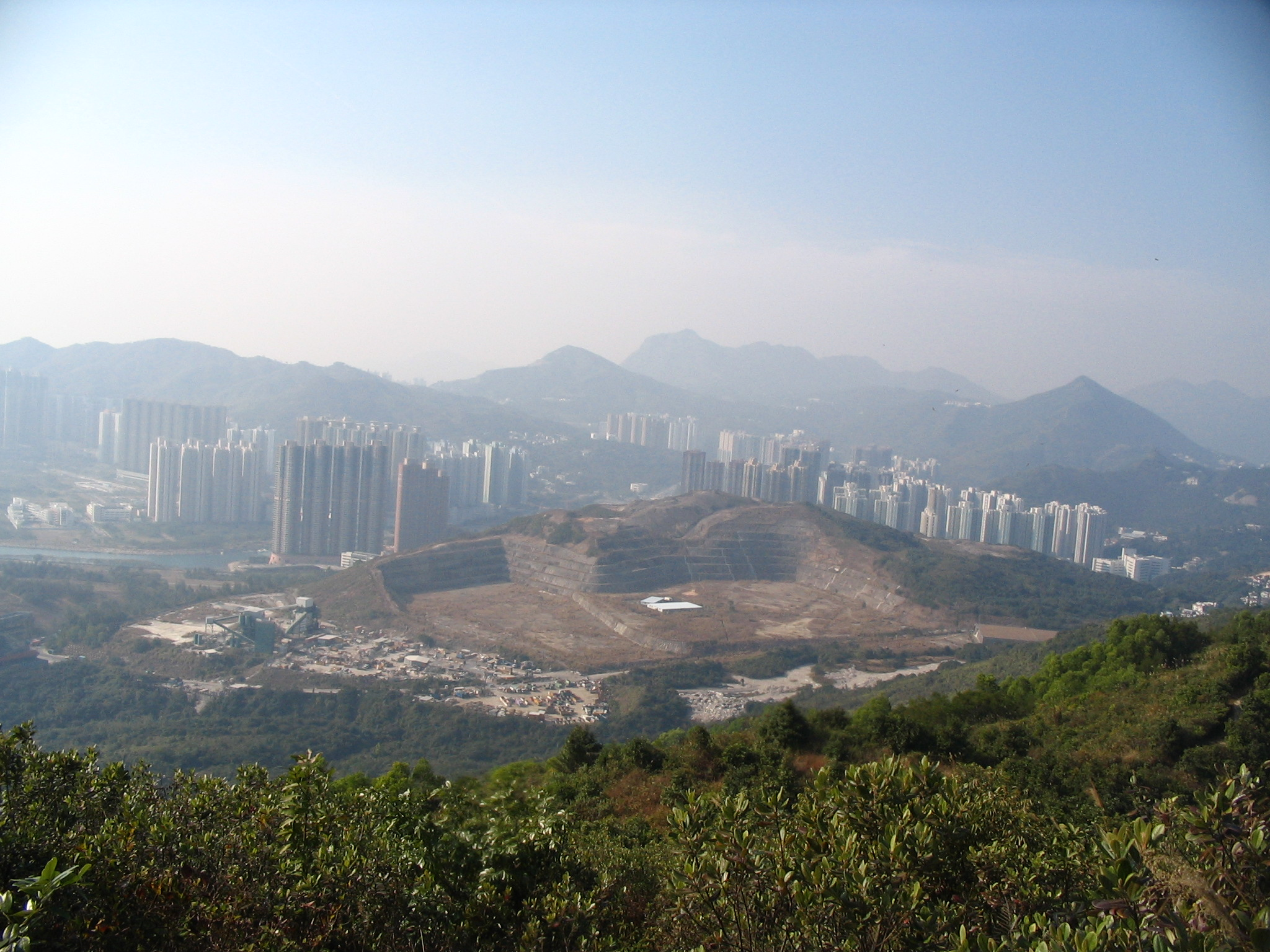
Pak Shing Kok in 2008, before the construction of the firefighter training facility.

Pak Shing Kok is an area in eastern Tseung Kwan O, Hong Kong. The Fire and Ambulance Services Academy is located in Pak Shing Kok.
