= Ricky Or =

Hong Kong politician

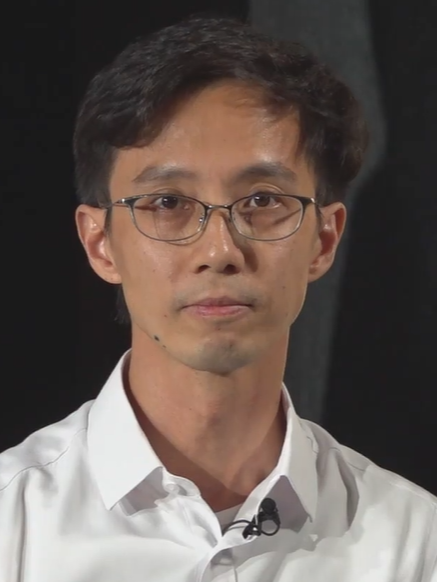
Or in the 2020 pro-democracy primaries.

Ricky Or Yiu-lam (Chinese: 柯耀林; born 12 May 1971) is a Hong Kong politician and a former member of the Sai Kung District Council for Kwong Ming. He is the former chairman of the Concern Group for Tseung Kwan O People's Livelihood and a former member of the Democratic Party.

== Biography ==
He first won a seat in Sai Kung District Council in Kwong Ming in the 2003 District Council elections. After joining Emily Lau's The Frontier, he ran in the 2004 Legislative Council election on the star-studded "7.1 United Front" ticket in New Territories East with stars like Lau, Andrew Cheng and Ronny Tong. Being on the last place of the ticket, received more than 168,000 votes. In the 2008 Legislative Council election, he partnered Lau on the Frontier ticket and received about 33,000 which got Lau re-elected in the constituency. Following the merger of the Frontier and the Democratic Party in 2008, Or joined the Democrats and became its executive committee member.

In the 2011 District Council elections, Or lost his Kwong Ming seat to Chong Yuen-tung of the Democratic Alliance for the Betterment and Progress of Hong Kong (DAB) in a six-way contest. He ran with Emily Lau for the last time in the 2012 Legislative Council election, with Lau being re-elected by receiving more than 37,000 votes.

Or was one of the marshals in the pro-democracy Occupy protests in 2014. He and another marshal Alex Kwok Siu-kit engaging in a brawl and subduing three men, who allegedly attacked media mogul Jimmy Lai in November by throwing pig offal at him in the Admiralty sit-in area. They were later arrested and charged of fighting in public by the police. In March 2015, the government decided not to press the charge against the two.

On 6 January 2021, Or was among 53 members of the pro-democratic camp who were arrested under the national security law, specifically its provision regarding alleged subversion. The group stood accused of the organisation of and participation in unofficial primary elections held by the camp in July 2020. Or was released on bail on 7 January.

Or was disqualified on 8 October 2021 after his oath-taking was invalid due to his involvement of the last year pro-democracy primaries.

On 30 May 2024, Or was found guilty of subversion in the primaries case, along with 13 other defendants. On 19 November 2024 he was sentenced to 6 years and 7 months of imprisonment.

Political offices
Preceded by Wong Hing-wah	Member of Sai Kung District Council; Representative for Kwong Ming; 2004–2011	Succeeded by Chong Yuen-tung
Preceded by Chong Yuen-tung	Member of Sai Kung District Council; Representative for Kwong Ming; 2020–present	Incumbent
