= Tseung Kwan O =

Town in Sai Kung District, New Territories, Hong Kong

Coordinates: 22.3043°N 114.2494°E

Tseung Kwan O 將軍澳
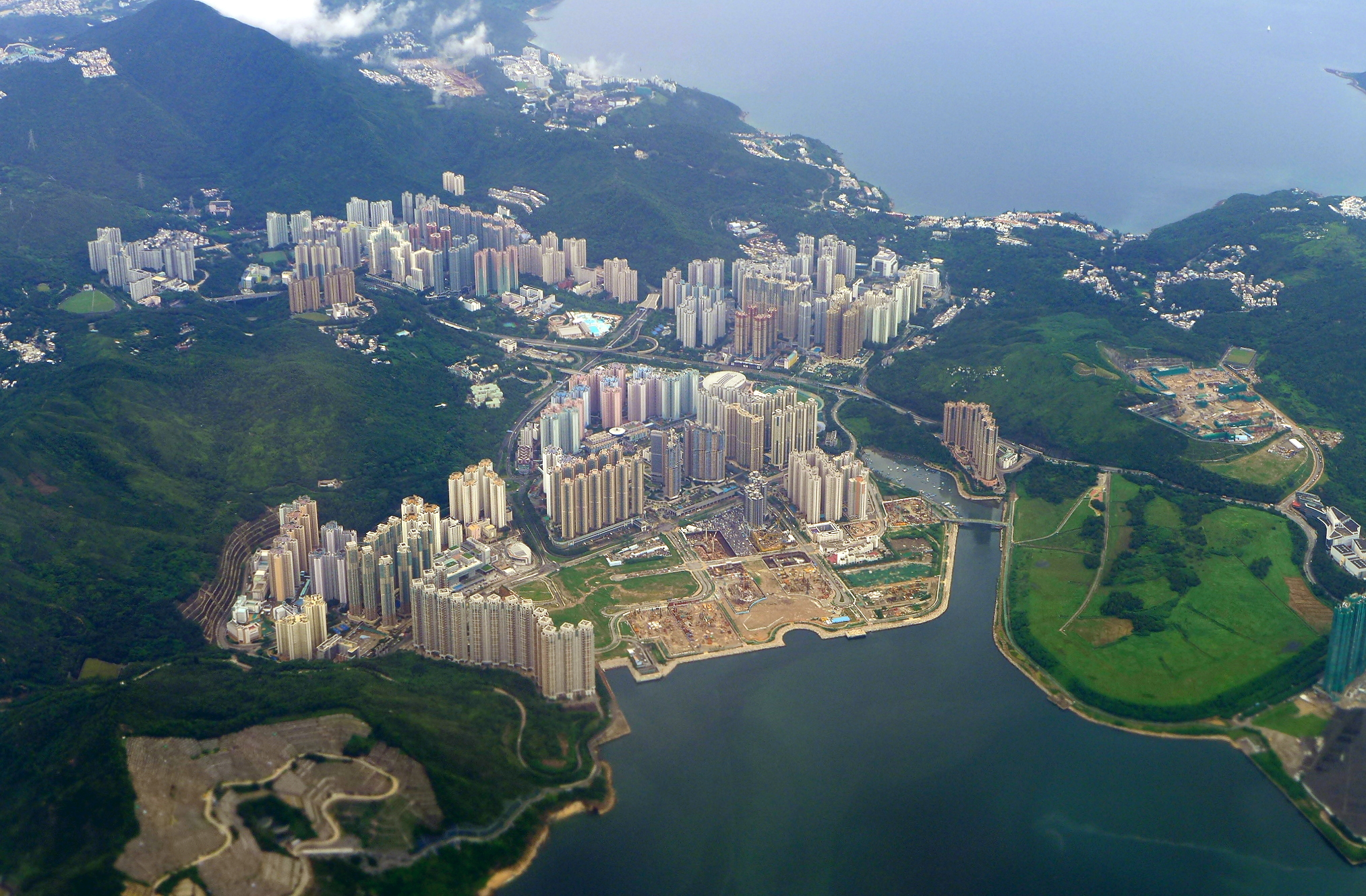
- Tseung Kwan O New Town in 2014
- Interactive map of Tseung Kwan O
- Country: China
- SAR: Hong Kong
- Region: New Territories
- District: Sai Kung
- Development began: Late 1980s

Area
  - Total: 17.18 km^{2} (6.63 sq mi)

Population (2016)
  - Total: 396,000
  - Density: 23,100/km^{2} (59,700/sq mi)

Tseung Kwan O
- Traditional Chinese: 將軍澳新市鎮
- Simplified Chinese: 将军澳新市镇
- Jyutping: Zoeng1 gwan1 ou3 san1 si5 zan3
- Cantonese Yale: Jēung gwān ou sān síh jan
Transcriptions
Standard Mandarin
- Hanyu Pinyin: Jiāng Jūn Ào Xīnshìzhèn
- Bopomofo: ㄐㄧㄤ ㄐㄩㄣ ㄠˋ ㄒㄧㄣ ㄕˋ ㄓㄣˋ
- Wade–Giles: Chiang^{1} Chün^{1} Ao^{4} Hsin^{1}-shih^{4}-chen^{4}
- IPA: [tɕjáŋ tɕwə́n âʊ ɕín.ʂɻ̩̂.ʈʂə̂n]
Yue: Cantonese
- Yale Romanization: Jēung gwān ou sān síh jan
- Jyutping: Zoeng1 gwan1 ou3 san1 si5 zan3
- IPA: [tsœŋ˥ kʷɐn˥ ɔw˧ sɐn˥ si˩˧ tsɐn˧]

Tseung Kwan O New Town, commonly known as Tseung Kwan O (Chinese: 將軍澳; Jyutping: zoeng1 gwan1 ou3), is one of the nine new towns in Hong Kong, built mainly on reclaimed land in the northern half of Junk Bay in southeastern New Territories, after which it is named.

Development of the new town was approved in 1982, with the initial population intake occurring in 1988. As of 2016, the town is home to around 396,000 residents. The total development area of Tseung Kwan O, including its industrial estate, is about 17.18 square kilometres (6.63 sq mi), with a planned population of 445,000. Major residential neighbourhoods within the new town include Tsui Lam, Po Lam, Hang Hau, Tseung Kwan O Town Centre, Tiu Keng Leng (also known by its English name Rennie's Mill) and Siu Chik Sha, etc.

Administratively, the new town belongs to Sai Kung District in southeastern New Territories, although it is often incorrectly regarded as part of Kowloon / New Kowloon due to its close proximity to the area — the new town is bordered by Kwun Tong District, a high rise built-up area, to Tseung Kwan O's west.

== History and urban development ==
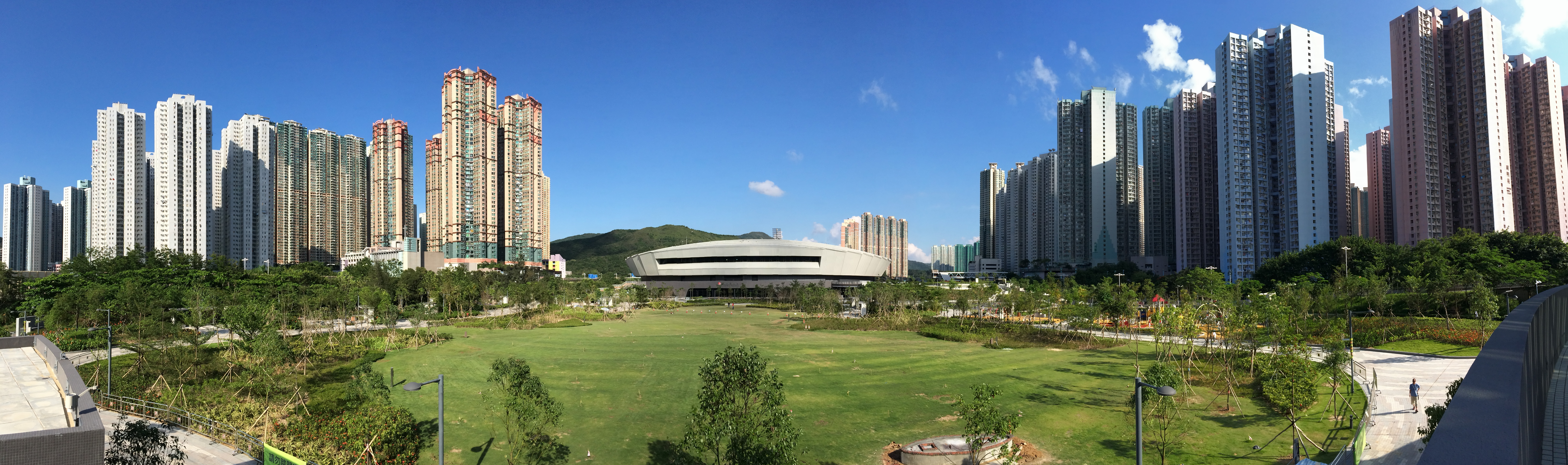
The view from Hong Kong Velodrome Park, the town park of Tseung Kwan O. Hang Hau and Tseung Kwan O Town Centre are on the left and right, respectively.

The land where Tseung Kwan O New Town now stands was, until the 1980s, a long narrow inlet named Junk Bay, with small fishing villages (such as Tseung Kwan O Village and Hang Hau Village, etc.) and a few small shipbuilding establishments dotting its coastline. The present-day neighbourhood of Tiu Keng Leng (then known as Rennie's Mill) was, from the 1950s to 1990s, a refugee village housing Kuomintang loyalists who fled to Hong Kong after their party's defeat in the Chinese Civil War.

The Hong Kong Government had long been interested in developing a new town at Hang Hau because of its proximity to the urban area. The project was postponed for a long time owing to the extensive scale of reclamation in the bay, which is rather deep. The project finally took off under the name of Tseung Kwan O in 1983, when the development of the new town's Phase I was endorsed by the Governor-in-Council. This was followed by the decision to proceed with Phase II, which entailed further reclamation and the clearance of the Kuomintang refugee village at Rennie's Mill (later renamed Tiu Keng Leng), with a view to increase the planned population from 175,000 to 325,000. The first families moved in to the new town in 1988 when public housing at the Head of the Bay (Po Lam Estate) was completed.

The New Town was developed in three phases. The first phase encompasses Northern Tseung Kwan O, which includes Po Lam MTR station and Hang Hau station, while the second and third phase comprise Southern Tseung Kwan O, which includes Tseung Kwan O station (Town Centre) and Tiu Keng Leng station.

- Phase I – Hang Hau, Po Lam, Siu Chik Sha, Tsui Lam
- Phase II – Town Centre North, Tiu Keng Leng
- Phase III – Town Centre South, Pak Shing Kok, Tai Chik Sha

The design of the new town was highly transit-oriented. Developments centred along the MTR-corridor, with more than 80% of the population living within five minutes of an MTR station, with huge residential complexes surrounding the MTR stations. As most of the residential complexes surrounds the MTR station, urban open space are usually planned at the periphery of each neighbourhood in Tseung Kwan O. Neighbourhoods are therefore separated by parks.

== Geography ==
Tseung Kwan O is located near the southeastern tip of the New Territories mainland, 9 to 12 km (5.6 to 7.5 mi) east-southeast from the Central District of Hong Kong.

The town is bounded on the south by the namesake Junk Bay, known as Tseung Kwan O (將軍澳) in Chinese. Most of the residential developments in the new town stand on land reclaimed from the bay. The mountains of Devil's Peak, Chiu Keng Wan Shan, Black Hill and Tai Sheung Tok form the new town's western boundary, where it borders Kwun Tong District of Kowloon. Lying to the north and southeast of the town are Razor Hill and High Junk Peak, which separate the new town from the rural parts of Sai Kung District.

The whole of Tseung Kwan O belongs to Sai Kung District, part of the New Territories. The town is, however, situated far away from other major population centres of the New Territories, and is instead in close proximity with Kwun Tong in Kowloon. While the town is entirely within the New Territories East geographical constituency, a number of governmental bodies and large corporations would, for the sake of administrative convenience, classify Tseung Kwan O as part of Kowloon East, adding to the confusion of the town's residents. For example, the Hospital Authority places Tseung Kwan O under its Kowloon East Cluster.

From 1992 to 2017, Tseung Kwan O had been policed under the Tseung Kwan O Division of the Kwun Tong Police District, and the upgraded Tseung Kwan O Police District still belongs to the Kowloon East Police Region. It is under such a situation that the new town is often incorrectly, or intentionally, referred to as part of Kowloon. This is illustrated by the fact that the two hotels in Tseung Kwan O are named Crowne Plaza Hong Kong Kowloon East and Holiday Inn Express Hong Kong Kowloon East.

=== Neighbourhoods ===
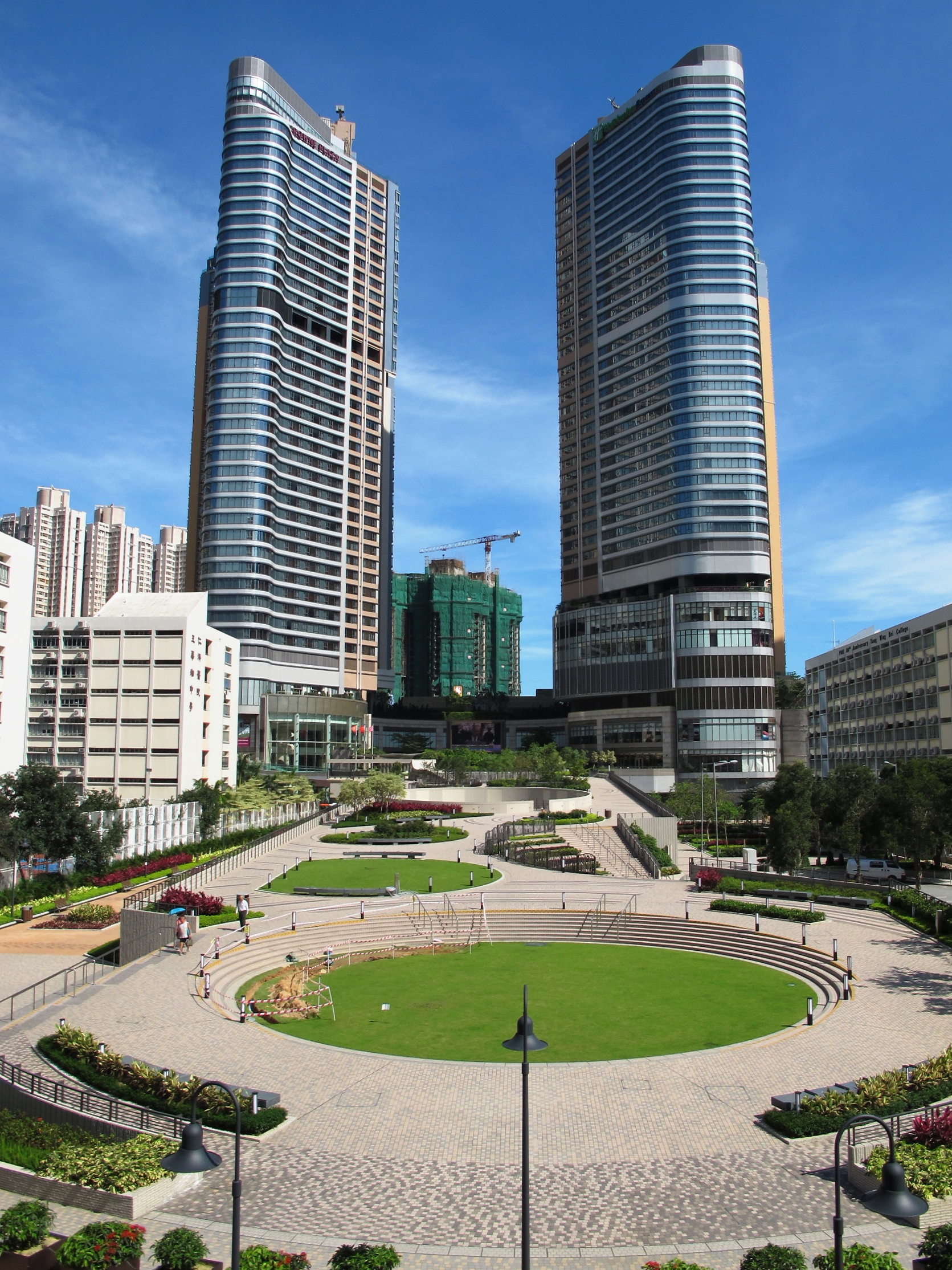
Two hotels complex in Tseung Kwan O Town Centre

The development of Tseung Kwan O New Town commenced from the head of the original inlet, on reclaimed land in front of the original indigenous villages of Tseung Kwan O and Yau Yue Wan. The Po Lam neighbourhood is where the earliest developments in the new town could be found. Notably, Po Lam Estate (1988) was the first residential development in the area. Metro City Plaza, with its three phases surrounding the MTR terminus, remains the largest shopping mall in the new town.

To the southeast of Po Lam lies the residential neighbourhood of Hang Hau. It was once a small market town that served the whole of Clear Water Bay Peninsula, and was also a hub for ship breaking industries. When the new town was developed, residents of Hang Hau Town were resited into the Hang Hau Town Resite Area at the neighbourhood's northern edge, known presently as Hang Hau Village. The reclaimed part of Hang Hau is now home to a number of residential developments as well as community facilities such as the District Hospital and Sai Kung District Council facilities.

Tseung Kwan O Town Centre refers to the area to the south of Po Lam, southwest of Hang Hau and east of Tiu Keng Leng. Centered on MTR Tseung Kwan O station, this is the major growth area in the new town where new residential developments are being built. The development of the town centre commenced with the construction of Sheung Tak Estate in 1998. It has since been extended southwards to the shoreline of Junk Bay. Early private residential developments in the area include Sun Hung Kai Properties' Park Central (2002) and The Wings (2012), and Nan Fung Group's Tseung Kwan O Plaza (2004).

Tiu Keng Leng (formerly Rennie's Mill) was once a cottage area housing refugees who settled in Hong Kong after the Kuomintang's defeat in the Chinese Civil War. The refugee village was cleared before the handover. It has since been redeveloped into a mid-size high-rise residential neighbourhood.

== Demographics ==
The 2016 Population By-census records the population of Tseung Kwan O New Town at 398,479, a 7.12% increase from 2011. This is equivalent to 86% of Sai Kung District's total population.

Among the residents of Tseung Kwan O, 42% live in private housing, 34% in some form of subsidized home ownership housing (e.g. HOS courts) and 23% in public rental housing. Each of 4 more well-developed neighbourhoods in the new town, namely Po Lam, Hang Hau, Tseung Kwan O Town Centre and Tiu Keng Leng, is a combination of the above 3 types of housing clustering around a metro station. Private housing estates usually come in the form of podium-tower structures, where the podium levels are shopping malls. Most public housing estates in Tseung Kwan O are equipped with their own shopping malls as well, although mostly smaller in size than their private counterparts.

The LOHAS Park residential project in the southern part of the new town will become the largest single residential enclave in Hong Kong, with 50 high-rises skyscrapers from 46 to 76 floors high after its full completion in 2025.

A handful of pre-existing indigenous villages are also retained in the new town design.

== Economy ==
Tseung Kwan O displays the characteristics of a commuter town as only less than 10% of the workforce living there works within the same district, according to the 2016 Population By-census.

=== Industries ===
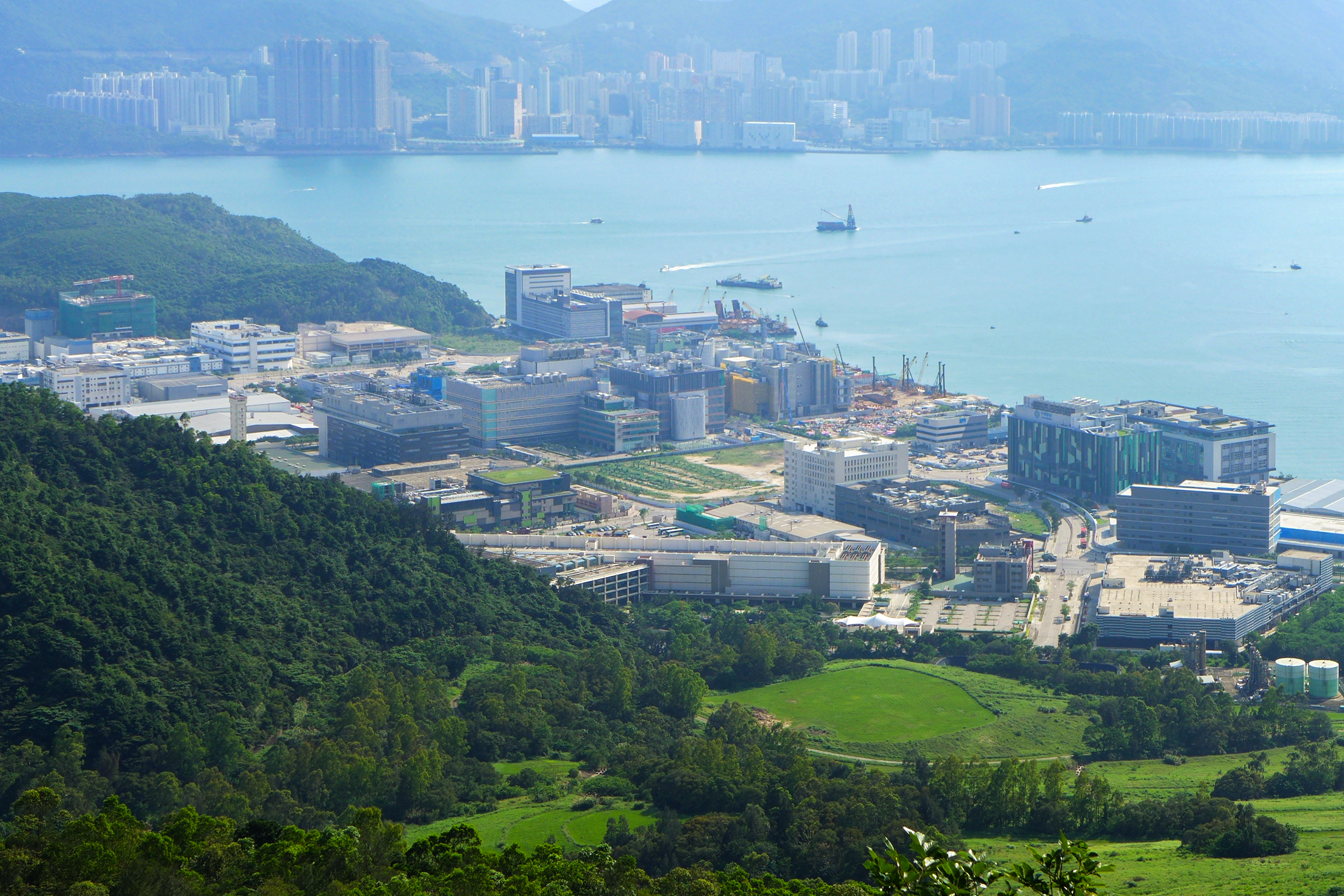
A bird's-eye view of Tseung Kwan O Industrial Estate

Tseung Kwan O Industrial Estate is located in the southeastern part of the town. Apart from various manufacturing industries that could not be housed in conventional multi-storey industrial buildings, the estate is also where a number of mass media outlets locate their headquarters at, including TVB City, the headquarters of Hong Kong's largest television broadcaster, and news agencies like Apple Daily (forcibly closed on 24 June 2021) and Sing Tao Daily. The industrial estate hosts a high concentration of data centres due to the fact that three out of the eight submarine communications cables connecting to Hong Kong make their landfall at the marine frontage of the estate.

Bus routes 797M (NWFB) and 298E (KMB) connect the industrial estate to southern Tseung Kwan O. A spur line of the MTR's Tseung Kwan O line to the LOHAS Park station was completed in July 2009 and provides easy access to the industrial estate from Kowloon and Hong Kong Island.

=== Shopping complexes ===
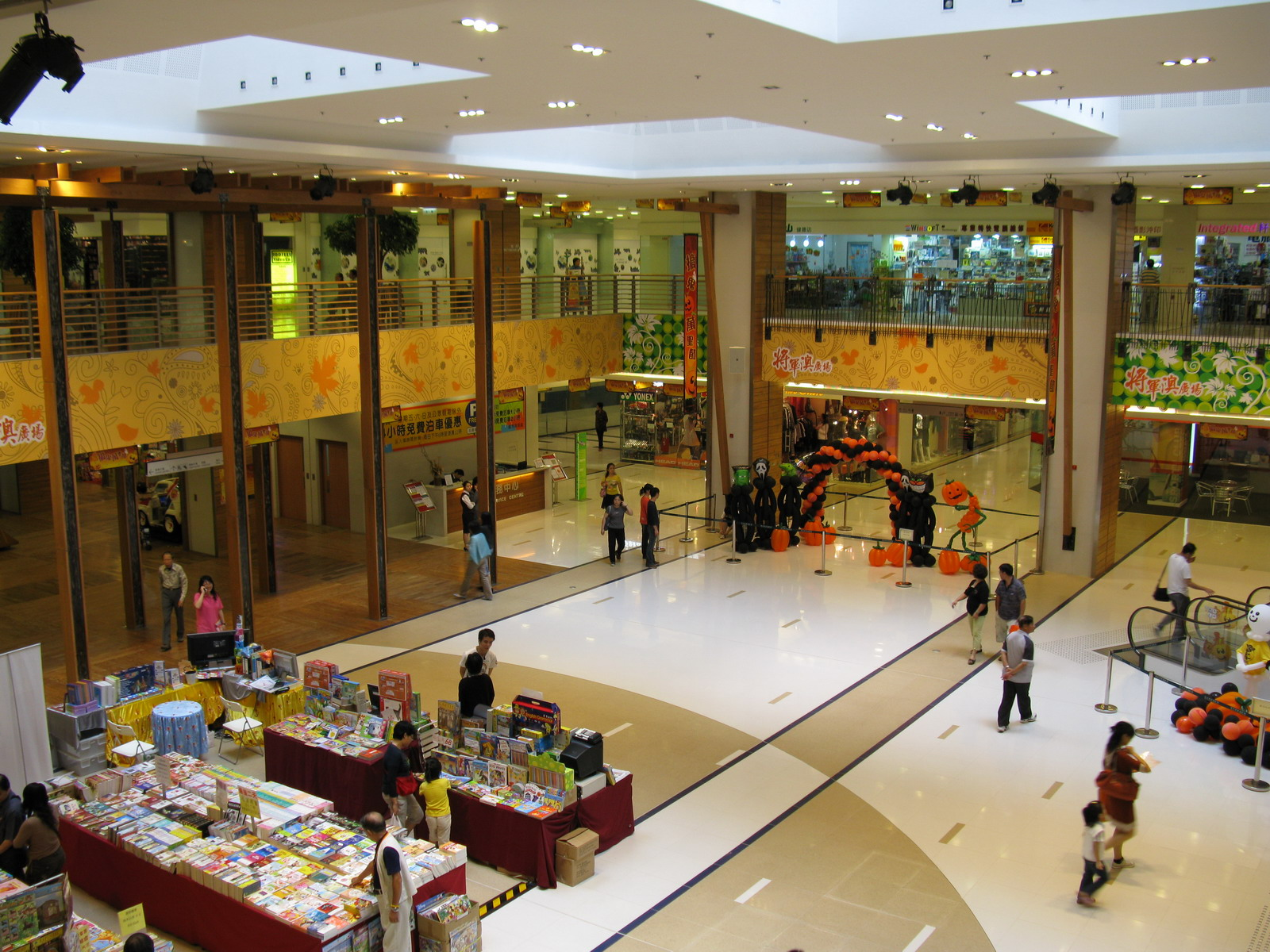
Shopping mall of Tseung Kwan O Plaza

Tseung Kwan O has several major shopping complexes, all sitting atop of or in close proximity to MTR stations. The largest shopping centre in the new town now is Metro City Plaza, which boasts three phases surrounding Po Lam MTR station.

Hang Hau MTR station is surrounded by a network of mid-sized shopping arcades linked by footbridges. A major part of this complex is East Point City.

Tseung Kwan O Town Centre (Tseung Kwan O MTR station) is home to Park Central, PopCorn, and Tseung Kwan O Plaza.

An iconic 480,000-square-foot MTR shopping mall The LOHAS has been built atop LOHAS Park station. It has one of the largest indoor ice rinks in Hong Kong as well as the largest cinema in Tseung Kwan O.

== Infrastructure ==
=== Transport ===
==== Rail ====
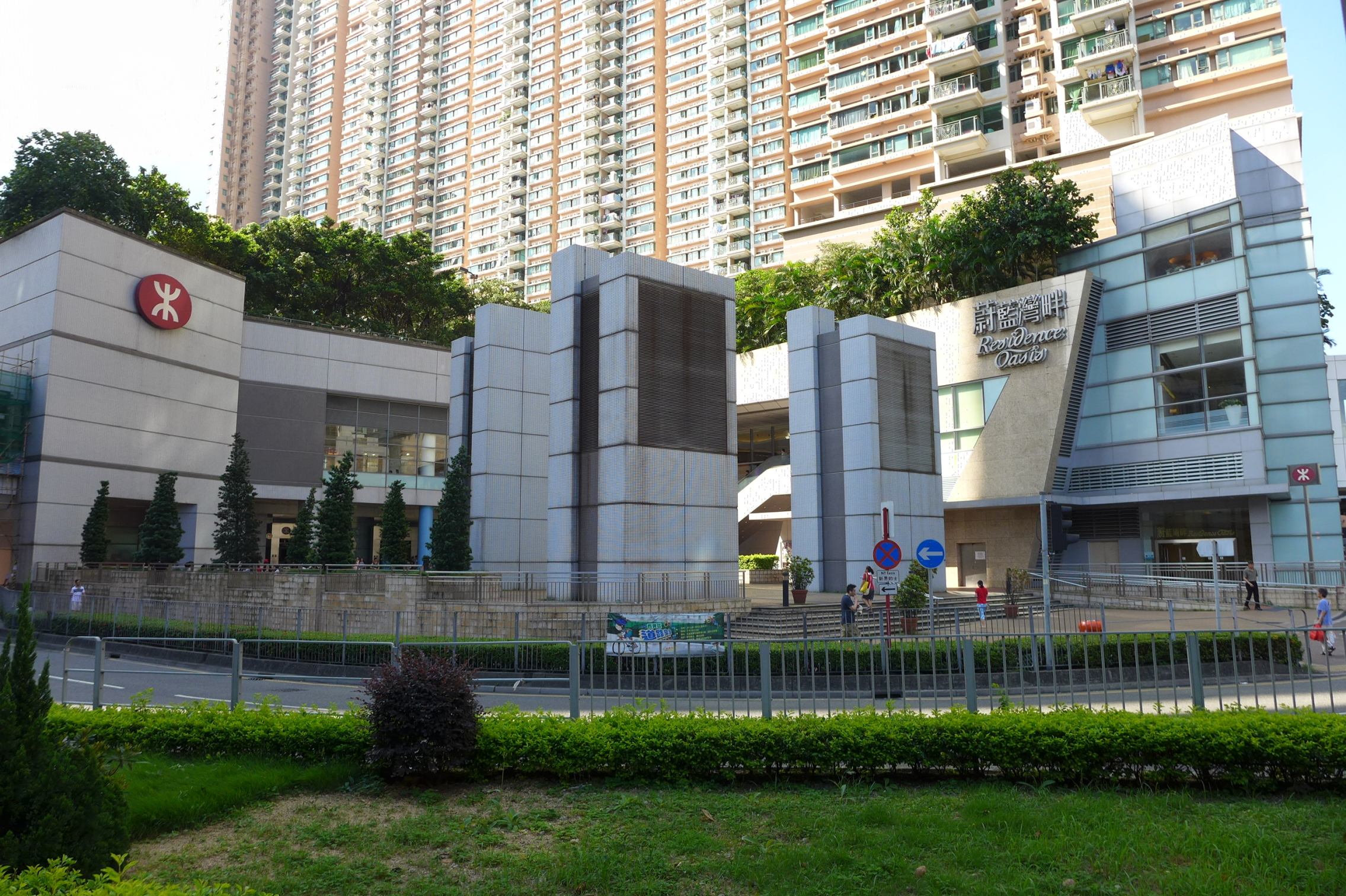
Hang Hau station on the lower levels of the Residence Oasis development

Tseung Kwan O is linked to urban Hong Kong Island by the namesake Tseung Kwan O line of the MTR metro system. The commutes from Po Lam and Tiu Keng Leng to Central District take 31 and 24 minutes, respectively. Currently the line calls at five stations in the new town: Tiu Keng Leng, Tseung Kwan O, Hang Hau, Po Lam, and LOHAS Park. Tiu Keng Leng station is also the terminus of MTR's Kwun Tong line which connects the town with Kowloon East. All MTR stations within the new town are either connected to or in the proximity of shopping centres and large private housing developments.

==== Bus services ====
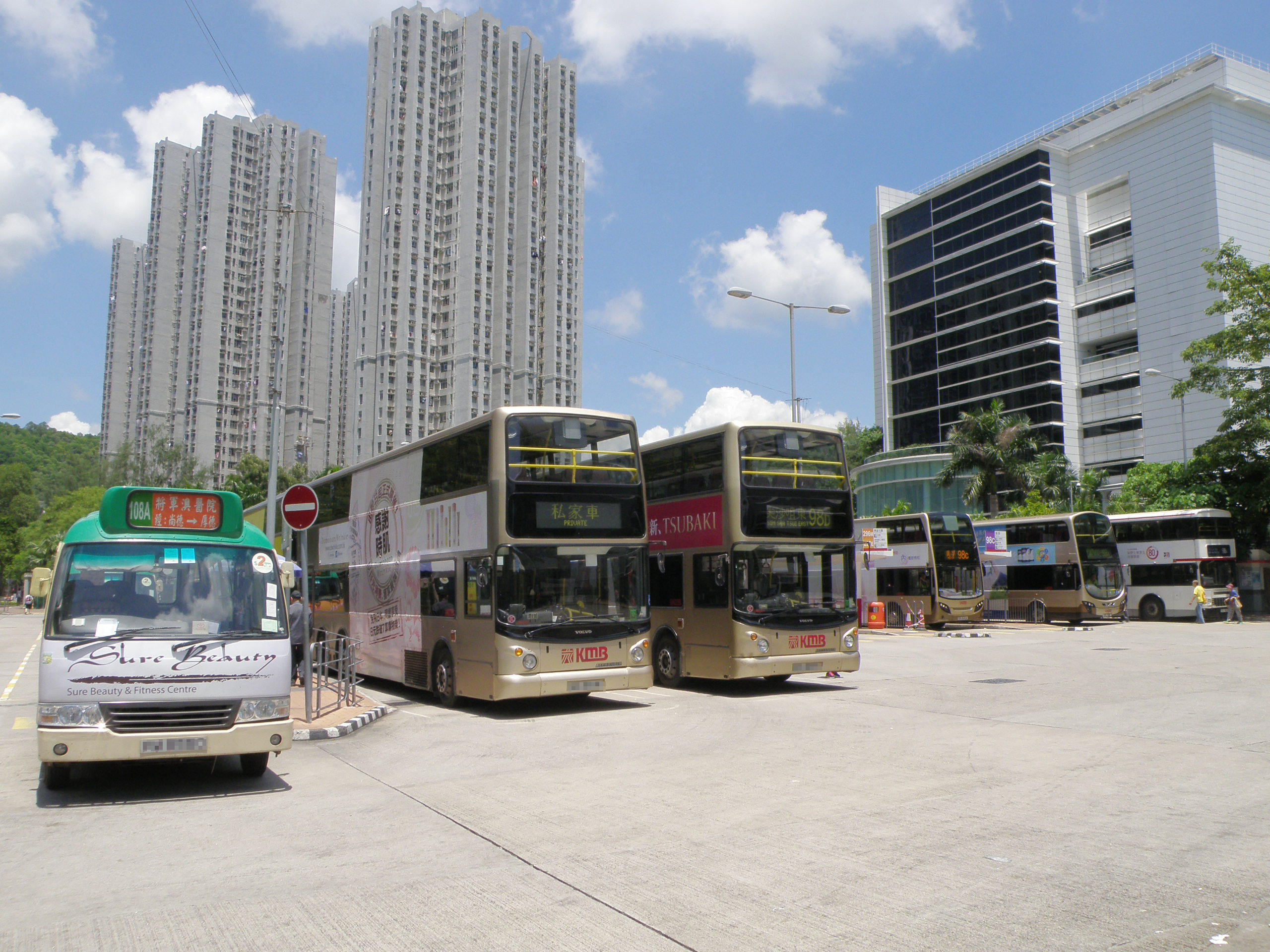
Hang Hau (North) Bus Terminus

The new town is also well-covered by the local public bus and minibus network. As of November 2019, a total of 50 bus routes ply between Tseung Kwan O and other districts of Hong Kong. Another 3 operate entirely within the new town. These are complemented by 37 green minibus routes. On the other hand, red minibuses are banned from entering Tseung Kwan O.

Hong Kong's three major bus operators all have routes serving Tseung Kwan O. Kowloon Motor Bus, the major bus operator in the New Territories, serves mainly Po Lam and Hang Hau areas. Having successfully tendered for a package of bus routes serving southern Tseung Kwan O, New World First Bus now operates an extensive network serving Tiu Keng Leng, Tseung Kwan O Town Centre and most of the town's southern part. The new town is linked to the airport at Chek Lap Kok by a handful of Citybus routes.

Bus termini could be found at Metro City Plaza in Po Lam; Tsui Lam Estate and Hong Sing Garden in Tsui Lam; Hang Hau station and Hang Hau (North) in Hang Hau; Tseung Kwan O station and Sheung Tak Estate in Tseung Kwan O Town Centre; Tiu Keng Leng station and Kin Ming Estate in Tiu Keng Leng; as well as at Oscar by the Sea, LOHAS Park and the Industrial Estate in the town's southeastern part.

==== Road network ====
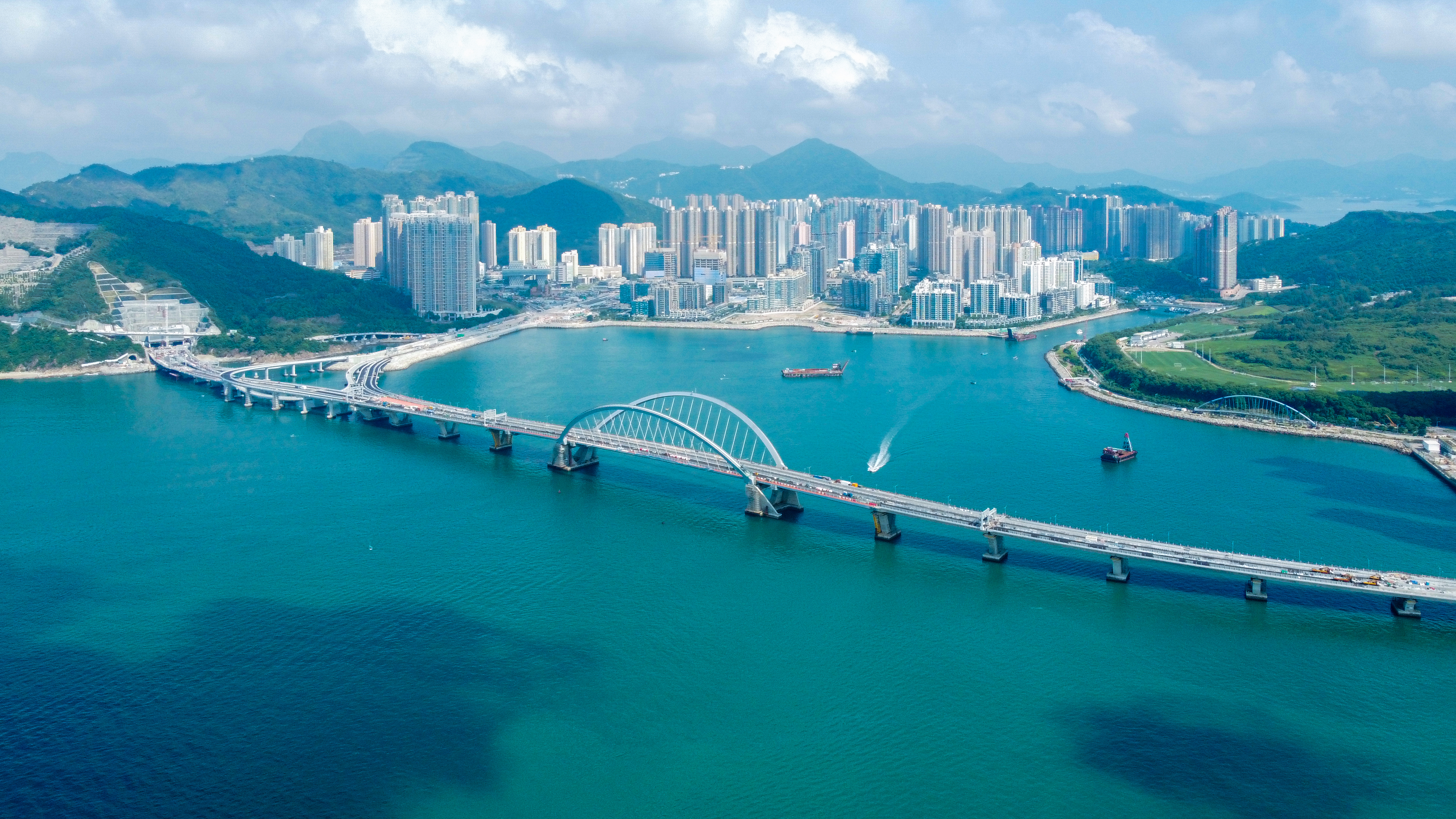
Tseung Kwan O Cross Bay Bridge

The new town is connected to urban Kowloon through two road tunnels. The Tseung Kwan O Tunnel acts as the major road link between Tseung Kwan O and Kwun Tong. Built to alleviate the heavy pressure on Tseung Kwan O Tunnel, the Tseung Kwan O – Lam Tin Tunnel opened to traffic in 2022 and offers a more direct linkage to the Eastern Harbour Crossing.

Other main roads leading to Tseung Kwan O include:

- Po Lam Road, connected to Kwun Tong.
- Hang Hau Road and Ying Yip Road, connected to Sai Kung and Clear Water Bay.
- Wan Po Road, connected to Tseung Kwan O Industrial Estate.

The Tseung Kwan O Cross Bay Bridge spans Junk Bay and is Hong Kong's first marine viaduct that boasts carriageways, a cycle track and a footway.

=== Healthcare ===
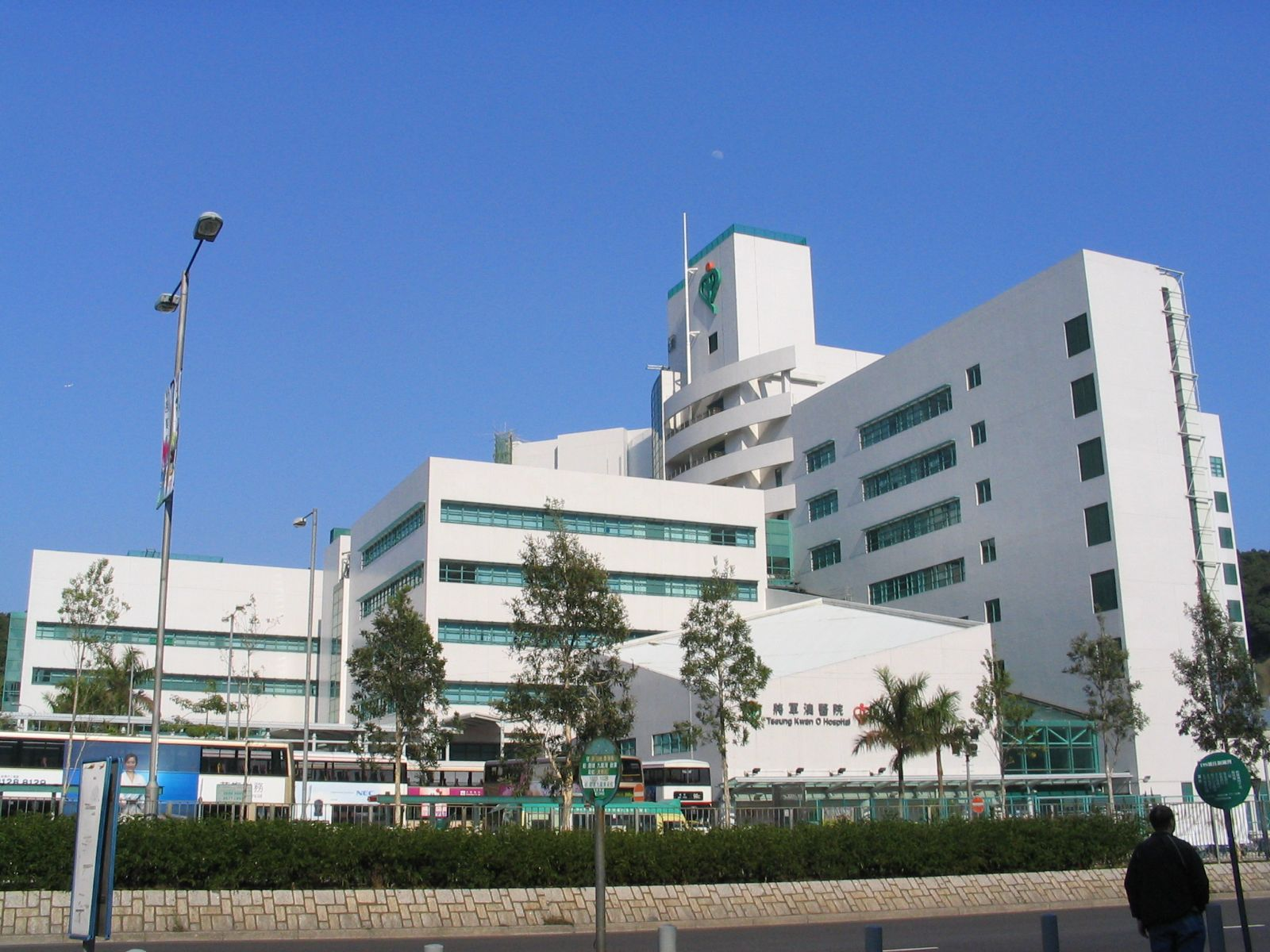
Tseung Kwan O Hospital

Tseung Kwan O Hospital in Hang Hau North is the only secondary care hospital within the new town boasting a 24-hour emergency department.

Situated on the western slopes of Tseung Kwan O is Haven of Hope Hospital, where subacute medical care, comprehensive rehabilitation and long-term care is provided.

The two hospitals are supplemented by public healthcare facilities like the Tseung Kwan O Jockey Club General Out-patient Clinic and Po Ning Road Health Centre, as well as the numerous private physician practices scattered among the various residential areas in the new town.

=== Waste management ===
East of the Tseung Kwan O Industrial Estate is the 10-hectare South East New Territories Landfill (SENT), one of the three remaining landfills in Hong Kong.

== Culture and recreation ==
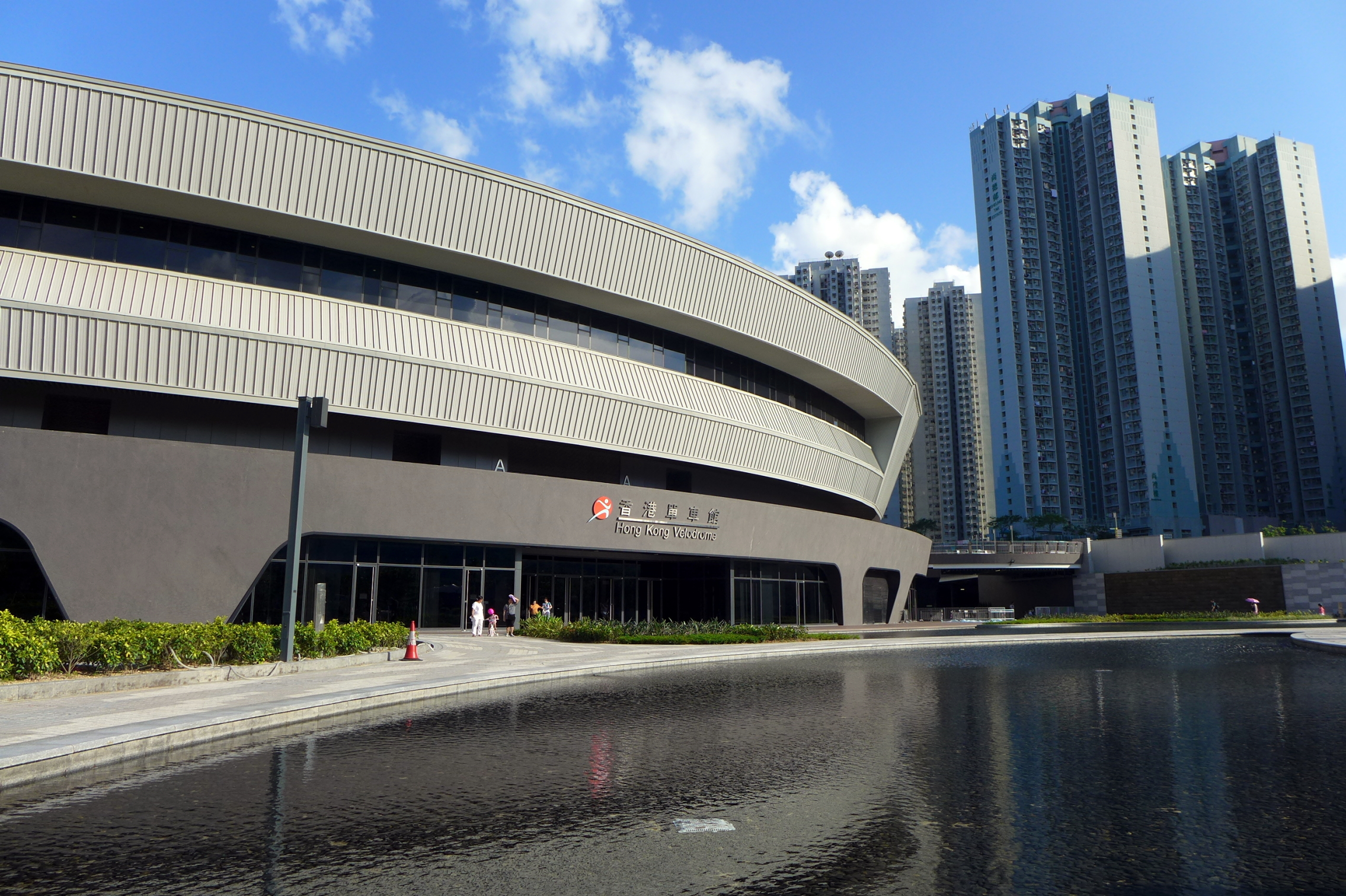
Hong Kong Velodrome

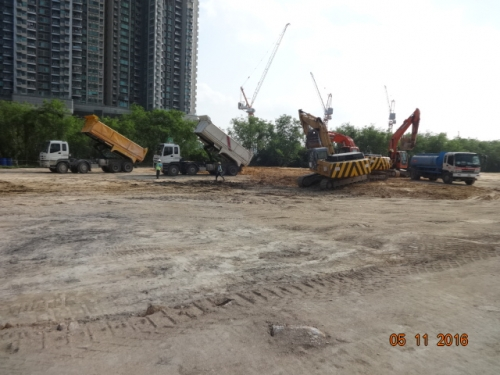
Tseung Kwan O Football Training Centre under construction

Tseung Kwan O's largest cultural and recreational complex is situated by the road interchange at the end of Tseung Kwan O Tunnel Road. It comprises a swimming Pool, an indoor games hall and a public library. Additional sports centres are available in Po Lam Estate, Hang Hau and Tiu Keng Leng, albeit smaller in size. Tseung Kwan O still lacks a performing arts centre, however.

Located between Tseung Kwan O Town Centre and Hang Hau, Tseung Kwan O Sports Ground was built for the 2009 East Asian Games. It was completed in early 2009 and started to host top-division football matches afterwards. The adjacent Hong Kong Velodrome has also hosted world-class cycling events like the 2017 UCI Track Cycling World Championships, since its completion in 2013.

Tseung Kwan O Football Training Centre is being developed to deliver six state of the art pitches; three artificial and three natural. It is being funded by the Hong Kong Jockey Club, spearheaded by Hong Kong Football Association, and constructed by Projexasia.

There are two public libraries in Tseung Kwan O. The amphitheatre-shaped Tseung Kwan O Public Library, which opened in 2001, is part of the new town's largest recreational complex mentioned above. It was the only library in the new town until 2015, when the Tiu Keng Leng Public Library was established. Both libraries belong to the Hong Kong Public Libraries system managed by the Leisure and Cultural Services Department.

== Education ==
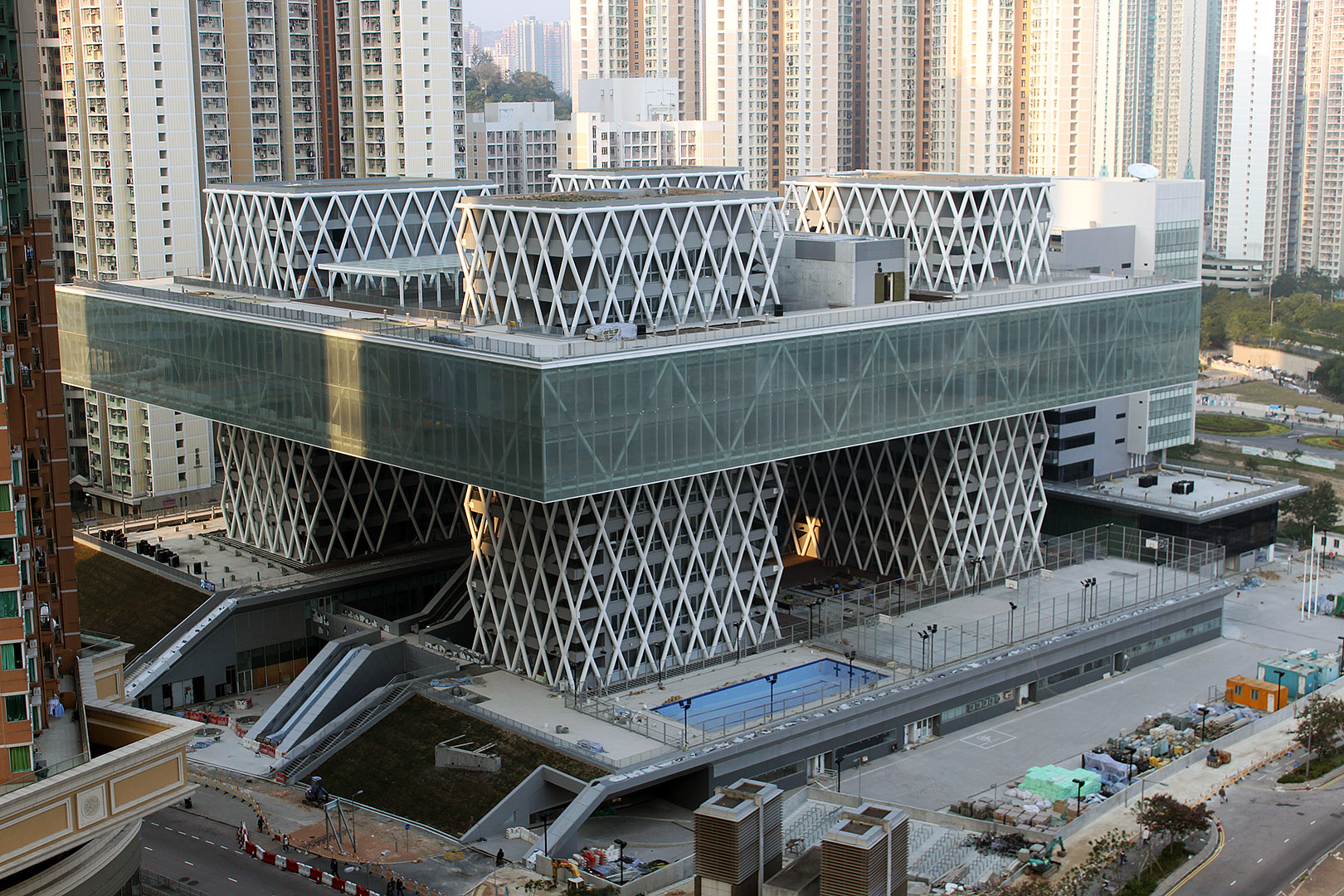
The purpose-built campus of the Hong Kong Design Institute in Tiu Keng Leng

Tseung Kwan O has an array of 24 primary schools and 24 secondary schools teaching the local curriculum, scattering across its major residential areas. There are also more than 40 kindergartens in the new town. In 2018, the French International School of Hong Kong (香港法國國際學校) and Shrewsbury International School Hong Kong (思貝禮國際學校) opened their campuses in the new town, in Areas 67 and 85 of Tseung Kwan O respectively.

Tseung Kwan O is in Primary One Admission (POA) School Net 95. Within the school net are multiple aided schools (operated independently but funded with government money) and one government school: Tseung Kwan O Government Primary School (將軍澳官立小學).

Hong Kong Public Libraries operates the Tseung Kwan O Public Library.

Tiu Keng Leng is home to the Hong Kong Design Institute and Lee Wai Lee Campus of the Hong Kong Institute of Vocational Education (IVE), two vocational education establishments operated by the Vocational Training Council. Caritas Institute of Higher Education is also located in the same neighbourhood. Although not located within the new town's boundaries, The Hong Kong University of Science and Technology is only a 10-minute ride from Hang Hau in the new town.

The Fire and Ambulance Services Academy, where all new recruits of the Hong Kong Fire Services Department are trained, is located in Pak Shing Kok of Tseung Kwan O South.

== Politics ==
The town is located within Sai Kung District and covered by a number of constituencies of the District Council. However, except several functions that are provided by the Home Affairs Department, the executive branch of the Hong Kong Government and its departments are not subdivided along the same borders as the districts and often have their own subdivisions. For example, the public hospitals of the town belong to the Kowloon East Cluster of the Hospital Authority.

== Climate ==
Climate data for Tseung Kwan O (1993–2020)
Month	Jan	Feb	Mar	Apr	May	Jun	Jul	Aug	Sep	Oct	Nov	Dec	Year
Mean daily maximum °C (°F)	19.0 (66.2)	19.7 (67.5)	21.5 (70.7)	25.1 (77.2)	28.8 (83.8)	30.7 (87.3)	31.9 (89.4)	31.8 (89.2)	31.1 (88.0)	28.7 (83.7)	25.2 (77.4)	21.0 (69.8)	26.2 (79.2)
Daily mean °C (°F)	15.5 (59.9)	16.5 (61.7)	18.7 (65.7)	22.0 (71.6)	25.8 (78.4)	27.8 (82.0)	28.4 (83.1)	28.1 (82.6)	27.3 (81.1)	24.9 (76.8)	21.5 (70.7)	17.4 (63.3)	22.8 (73.1)
Mean daily minimum °C (°F)	12.9 (55.2)	14.1 (57.4)	16.4 (61.5)	19.8 (67.6)	23.5 (74.3)	25.5 (77.9)	25.9 (78.6)	25.6 (78.1)	24.8 (76.6)	22.3 (72.1)	18.9 (66.0)	14.3 (57.7)	20.3 (68.6)
Average precipitation mm (inches)	24.4 (0.96)	33.3 (1.31)	88.8 (3.50)	128.4 (5.06)	331.7 (13.06)	491.7 (19.36)	344.4 (13.56)	369.3 (14.54)	338.4 (13.32)	97.4 (3.83)	49.9 (1.96)	23.6 (0.93)	2,321.3 (91.39)
Average relative humidity (%)	74.8	80.2	82.4	85.1	85.3	85.0	83.4	84.5	81.3	74.8	74.5	71.1	80.2
Source: Hong Kong Observatory

== See also ==
- List of places in Hong Kong
- Public housing estates in Tseung Kwan O
