= Public housing estates in Shek Kip Mei =

Public housing in Shek Kip Mei, Hong Kong

Public housing estates in Shek Kip Mei are public housing in an area originally known as Kap Shek Mi in New Kowloon on the North Eastern Kowloon Peninsula of Hong Kong.

== History ==
Hong Kong's public housing program was initiated by Governor Alexander Grantham following a major fire on 25 December 1953. The Shek Kip Mei area was the location of tens of thousands of makeshift homes of immigrants from Mainland China. The fire cost many lives, and left 53,000 people homeless.

The public housing program introduced "multi story building" with fire- and flood-proof construction. The clearance of the fire debris and demolition of the remaining makeshift houses paved the way for construction of the Shek Kip Mei Low-cost Housing Estate (石硤尾廉租屋邨).

== Overview ==
Name		Type	Inaug.	# Blocks	# Units
Chak On Estate	澤安邨	Public	1983	4	1,903
Nam Shan Estate	南山邨	Public	1977	8	2,849
Pak Tin Estate	白田邨	Public	1975/1993	20	8,758
Shek Kip Mei Estate	石硤尾邨	Public	1979/2007	11	7,363
Tai Hang Tung Estate	大坑東邨	Public	1980	9	2,101
Tai Hang Sai Estate	大坑西邨	Private	1965	8	

== Chak On Estate ==
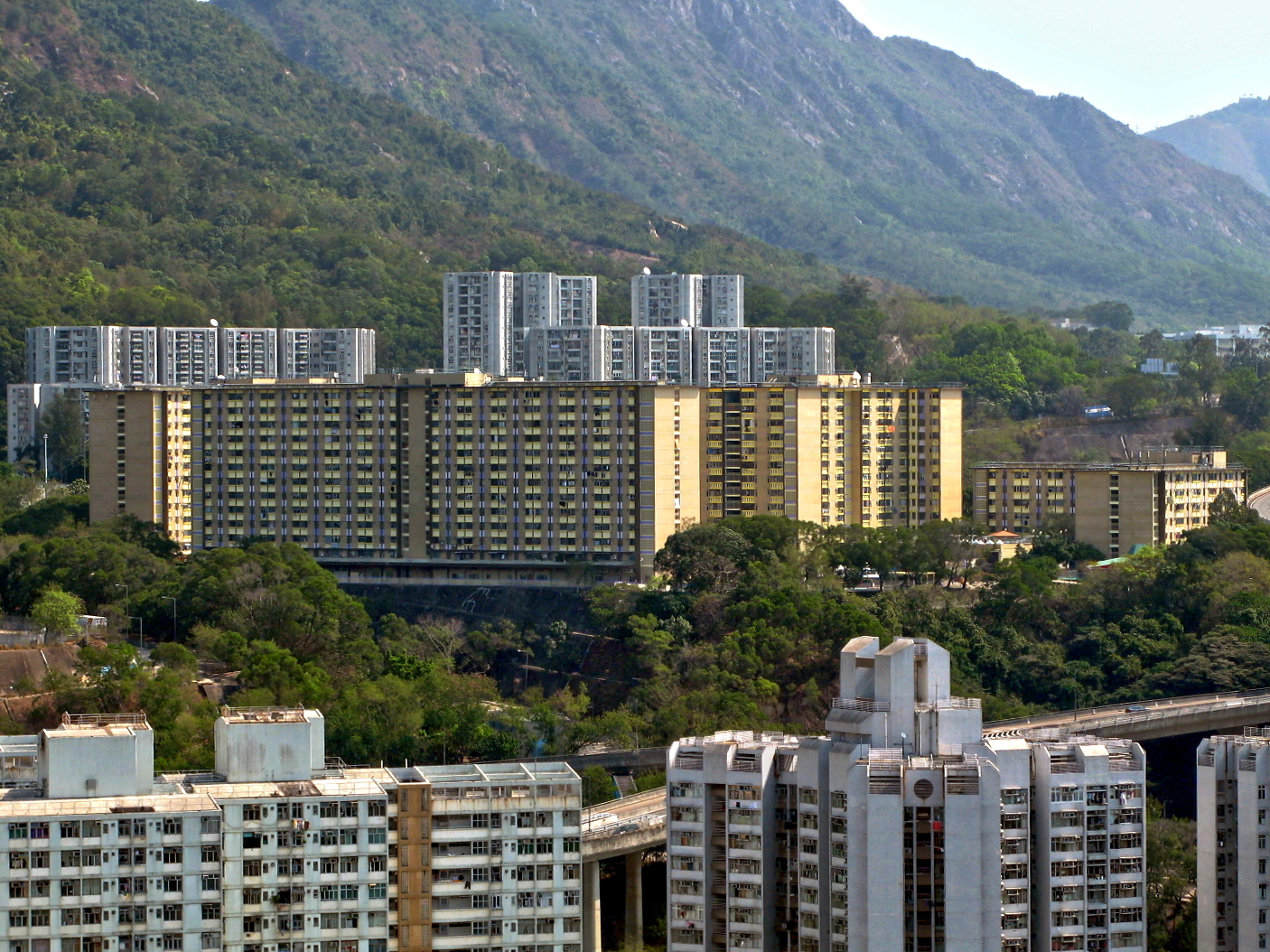
Chak On Estate

Chak On Estate (Chinese: 澤安邨) is a public housing estate in Tai Wo Ping, Shek Kip Mei. Formerly Tai Wo Ping Cottage Area (大窩坪平房區) and built at a hill near Lung Cheung Road, the estate consists of 4 residential blocks completed in 1983.

=== Houses ===
Name	Type	Completion
Lai Chak House	Single I	1983
Wah Chak House	Old Slab	1983
Fu Chak House	Old Slab	1983
Wing Chak House	Old Slab	1983

== Nam Shan Estate ==
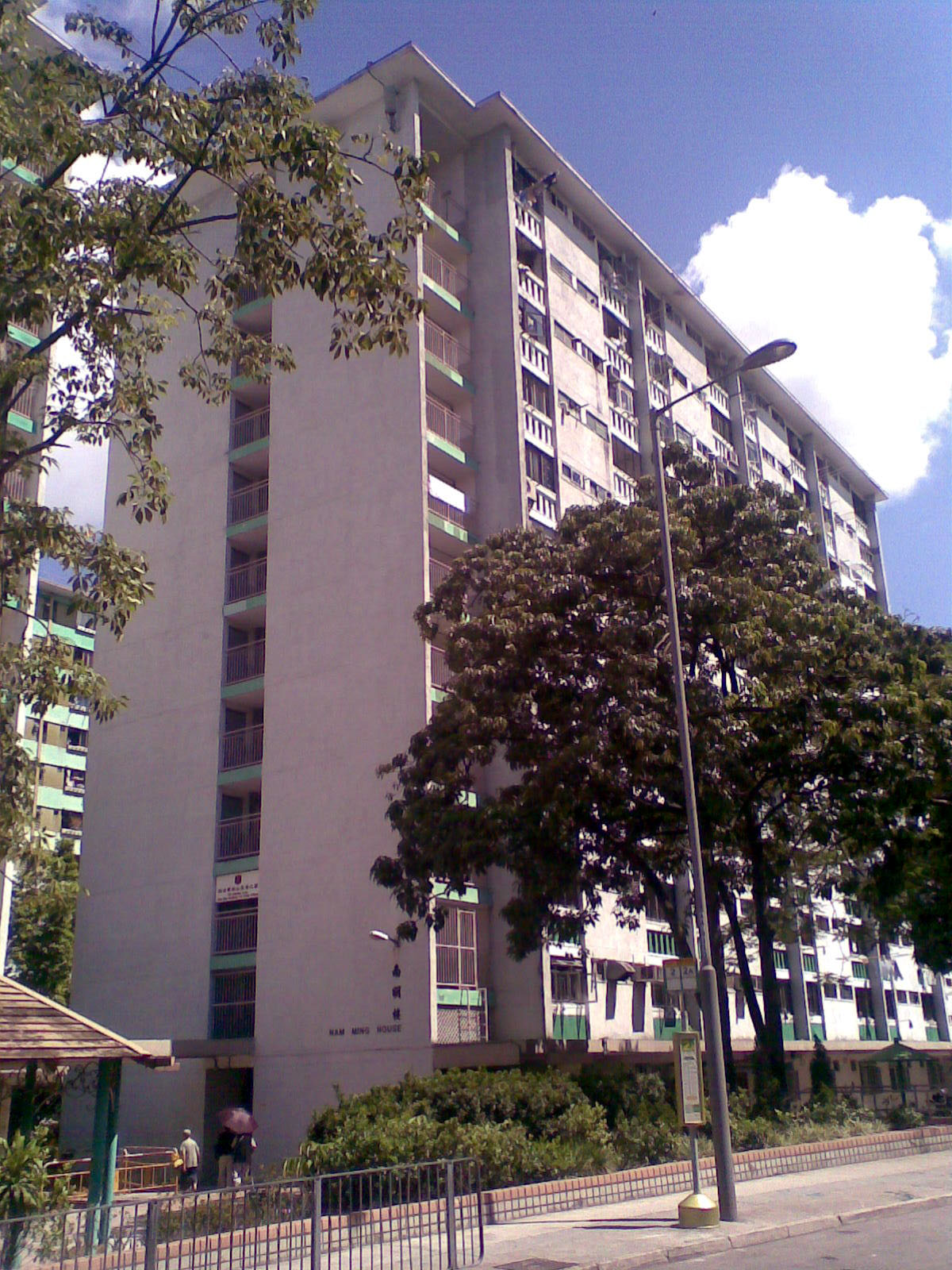
Nam Ming House, Nam Shan Estate

Nam Shan Estate (南山邨) is a public housing estate in Shek Kip Mei, located near Tai Hang Tung Estate, Tai Hang Sai Estate and Yau Yat Tsuen. It was formerly called "Kowloon Tsai". It comprises 8 residential blocks built in 1977.

=== Houses ===
Name	Type	Completion
Nam Fung House	Old Slab	1977
Nam On House	Old Slab	1977
Nam Wai House	Old Slab	1977
Nam Lok House	Old Slab	1977
Nam Ming House	Old Slab	1978
Nam Tai House	Old Slab	1978
Nam Yiu House	Old Slab	1978
Nam Yat House	Old Slab	1979

== Pak Tin Estate ==
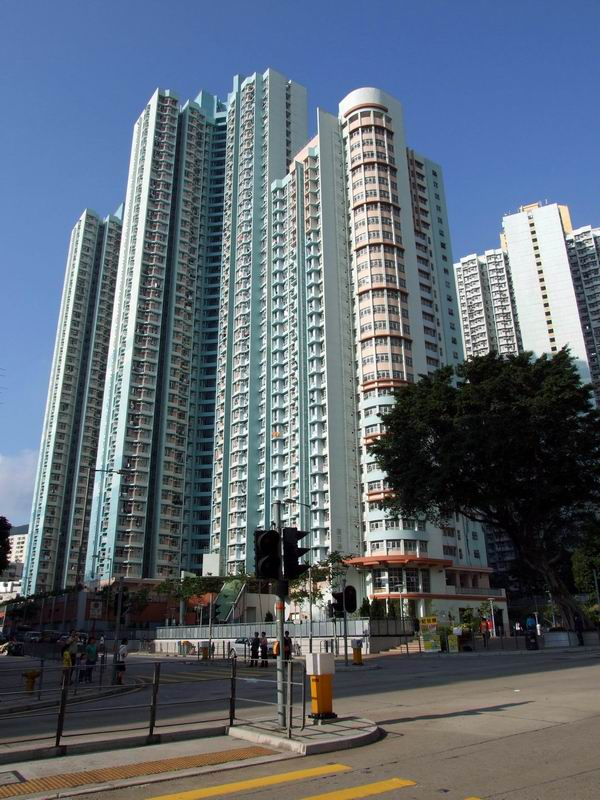
Pin Tak Estate Phase 3

Pak Tin Estate (白田邨) is a public housing estate in Shek Kip Mei, located between Shek Kip Mei Estate and Chak On Estate. It is currently the largest public housing estate in Shek Kip Mei.

== Shek Kip Mei Estate ==
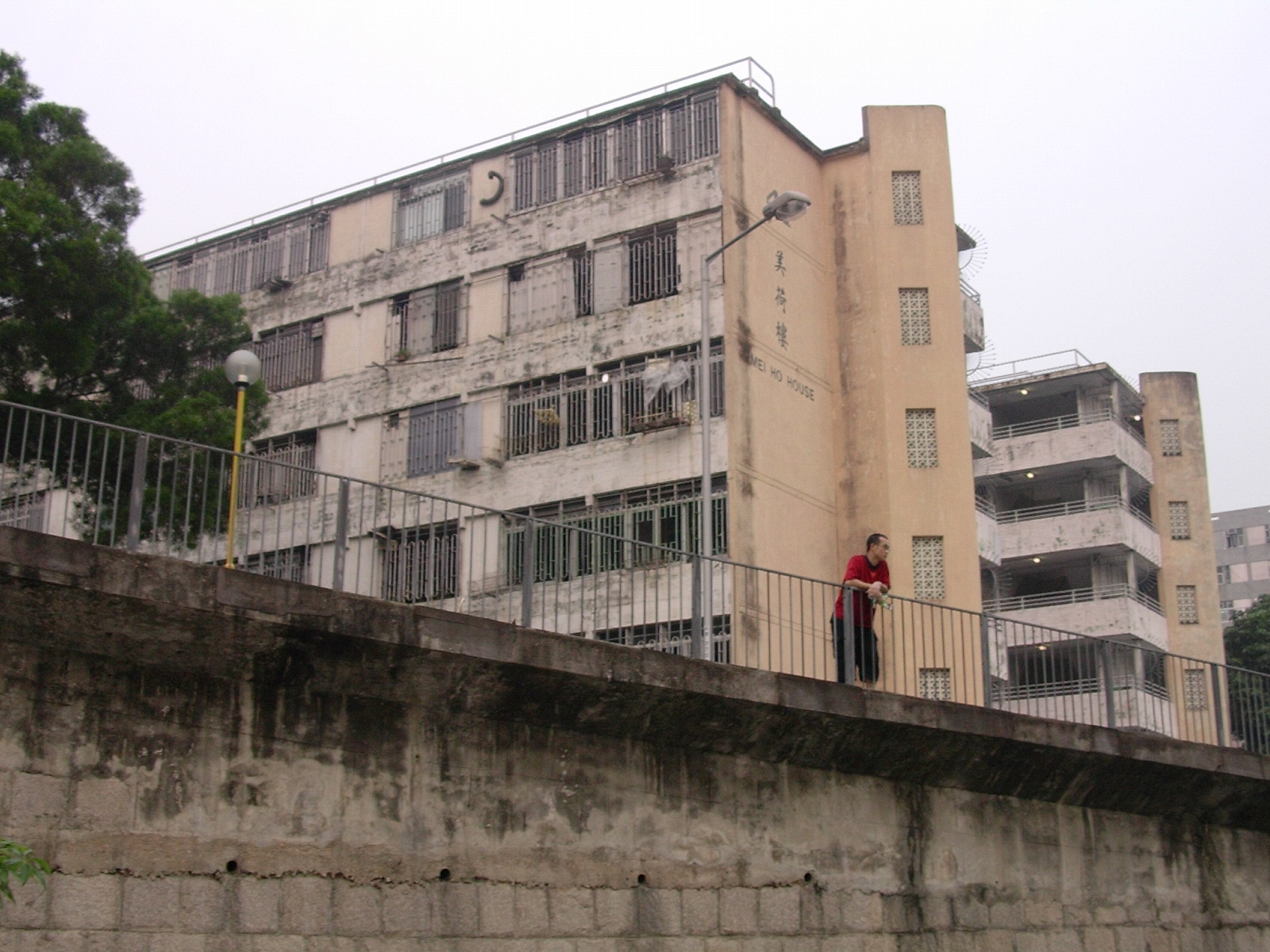
Mei Ho House, Shek Kip Mei Estate near Tai Po Road

Shek Kip Mei Estate (石硤尾邨) is the first public housing estate in Hong Kong. The estate was constructed as a result of a fire in Shek Kip Mei in 1953, to settle the families of inhabitants in the squats over the hill who lost their homes in one night.

== Tai Hang Tung Estate ==
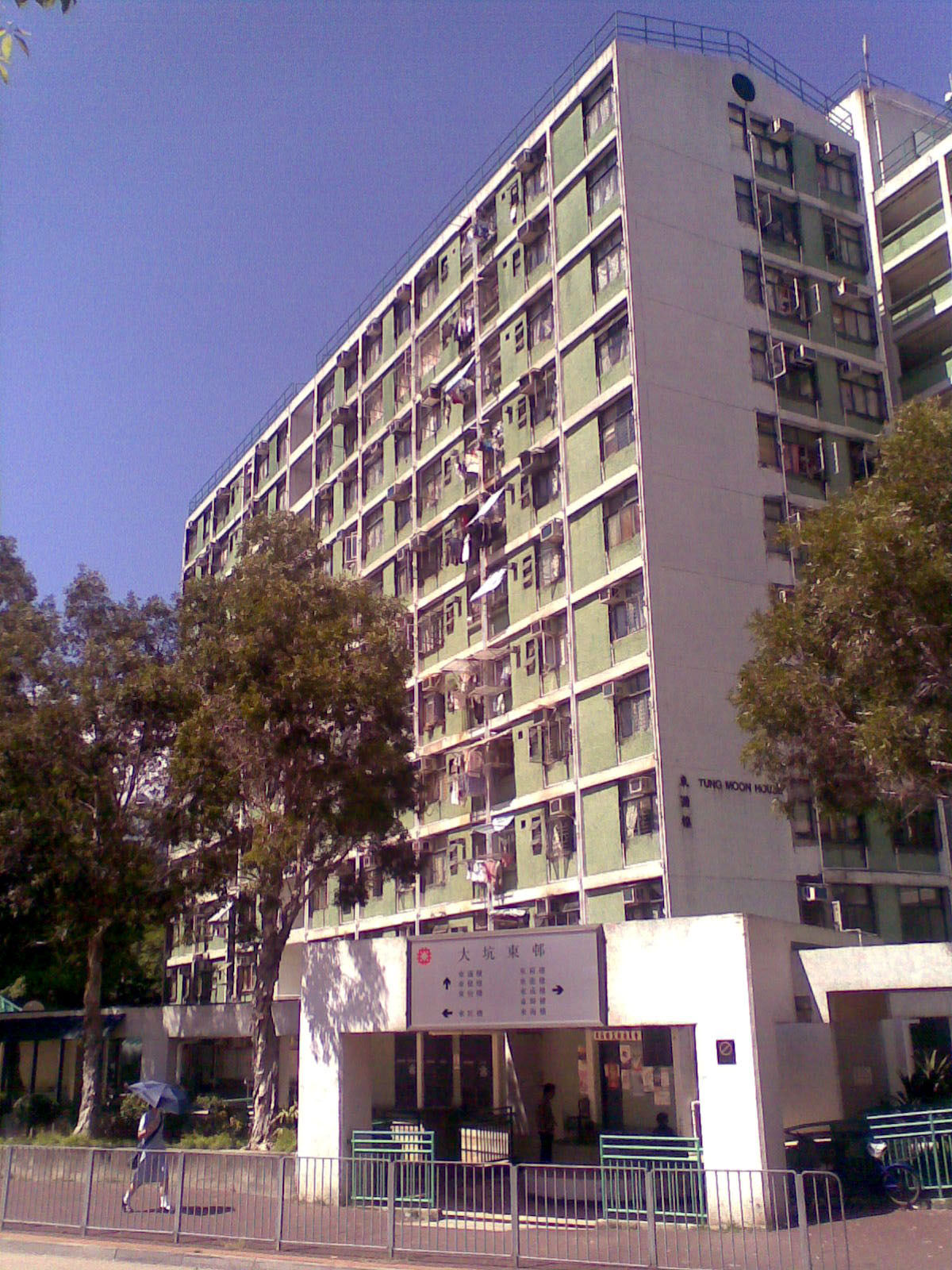
Tai Hang Tung Estate

Tai Hang Tung Estate (大坑東邨) is a public housing estate in Shek Kip Mei, located near Tai Hang Sai Estate and Nam Shan Estate.

== Tai Hang Sai Estate ==
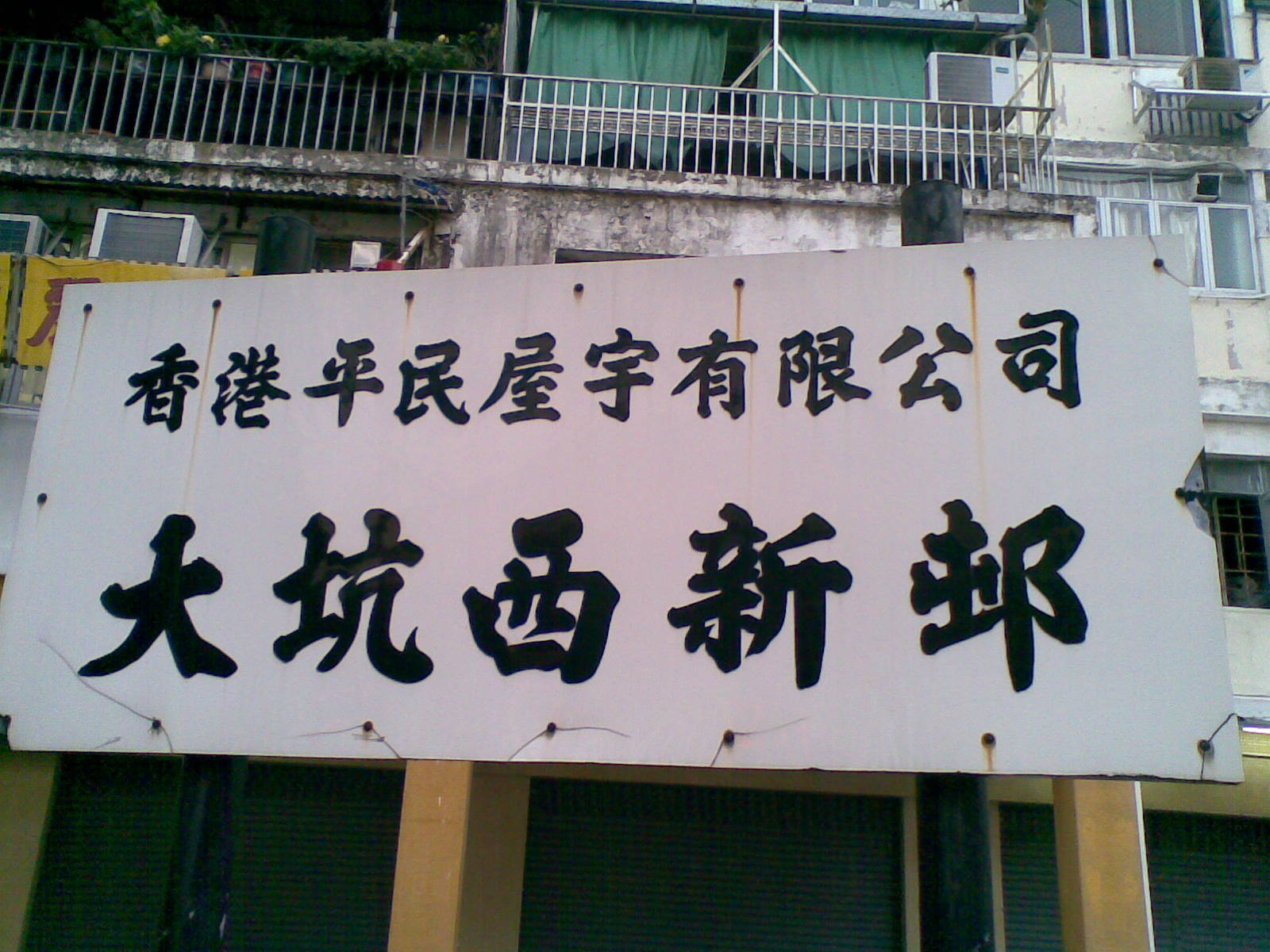
Tai Hang Sai Estate

Tai Hang Sai Estate (大坑西邨) is a private housing estate in Shek Kip Mei, located between Shek Kip Mei Estate and Tai Hang Tung Estate, near MTR Shek Kip Mei station. It consists of 8 residential buildings which were built in 1965 and 1977 respectively. The estate was built and managed by a privately owned company called "Hong Kong Settlers Housing Corporation Limited" (香港平民屋宇有限公司).

== See also ==
- Public housing in Hong Kong
- List of public housing estates in Hong Kong
