= Pak Tin Estate =

Public housing estate in Shek Kip Mei, Hong Kong

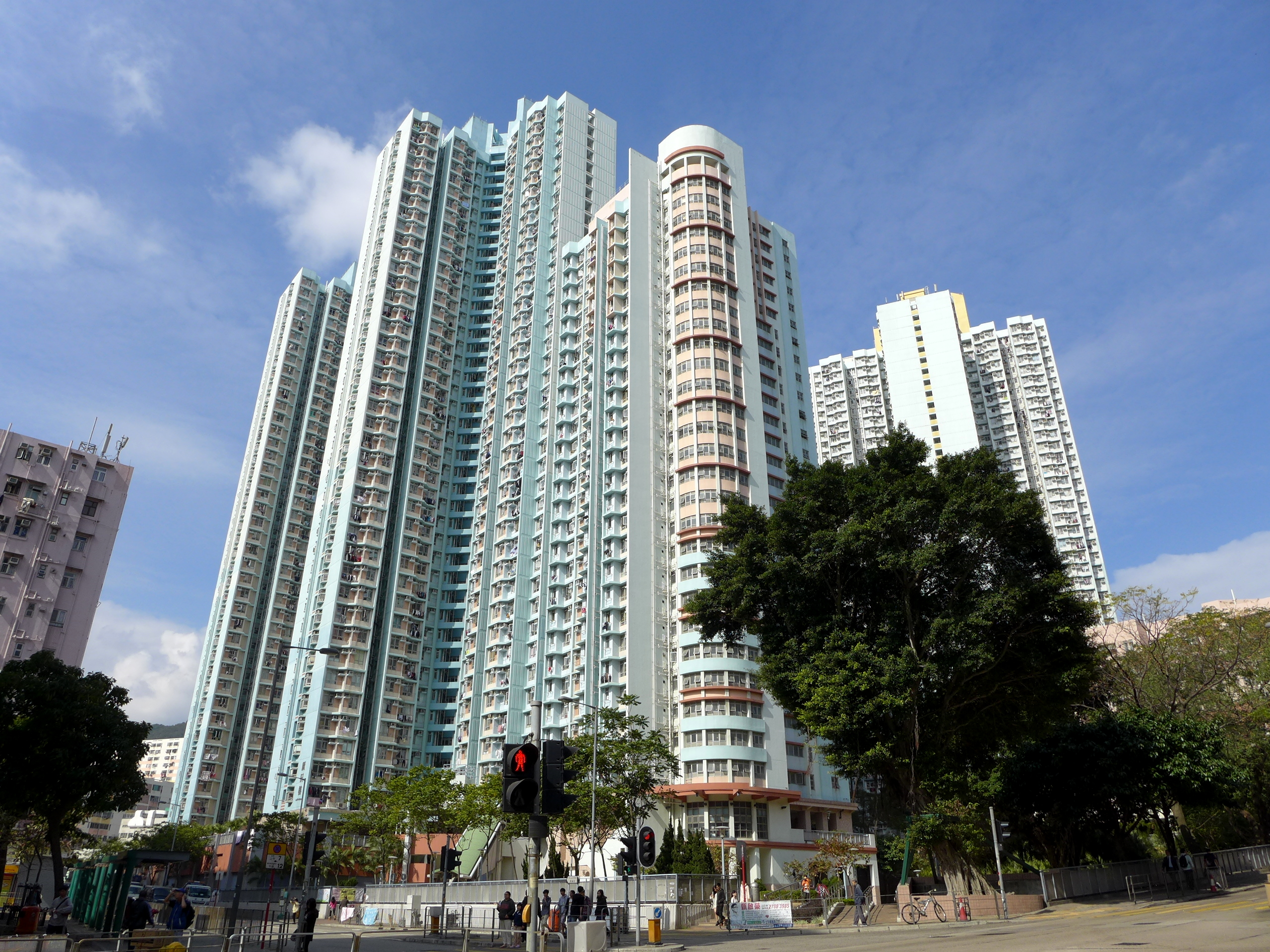
- Tai Tin House, Lai Tin House and Wan Tin House of Pak Tin Estate
- Interactive map of Pak Tin Estate

General information
- Location: 51 Pak Tin Street, Shek Kip Mei; Kowloon, Hong Kong
- Coordinates: 22.3364°N 114.1667°E
- Status: Completed
- Category: Public rental housing
- Population: 21,902 (2016)
- No. of blocks: 16
- No. of units: 8,758

Construction
- Constructed: 1979; 47 years ago
- Authority: Hong Kong Housing Authority

Pak Tin Estate (Chinese: 白田邨) is a public housing estate in Shek Kip Mei, Sham Shui Po, Kowloon, Hong Kong, located between Shek Kip Mei Estate and Chak On Estate.

== Background ==
Before redevelopment, Pak Tin Estate consisted of 17 residential blocks in total, which were built between 1969 and 1979. Block 1 to 3 and Block 7 to 17 were assigned to Upper Pak Tin Estate (Chinese: 白田上邨), while Block 4 to 6 were assigned to Lower Pak Tin Estate (Chinese: 白田下邨). In 1984, two estates were merged to form Pak Tin Estate. In 1985, the Hong Kong Housing Authority announced that the strength of the concrete of Block 14 to 16 had structural problems and they were firstly demolished in 1989. Block 4 to 8 and Block 17 were then demolished in the 1990s. Except Block 1 to 3 and Block 9 to 13, the demolished blocks are now replaced by new-typed buildings.

== Houses ==
Name	Type	Completion
Block 9	Old Slab	1979
Block 10	Old Slab	1979
Block 11	Old Slab	1979
Block 13	Old Slab	1979
Tsui Tin House (翠田樓)	Harmony 3	1993
Yue Tin House (裕田樓)	Harmony 3	1993
Chak Tin House (澤田樓)	Harmony 3	1997
Fu Tin House (富田樓)	Harmony 3	1997
Yun Tin House (潤田樓)	Harmony 1	1997
On Tin House (安田樓)	Small Household Block	1998
Shui Tin House (瑞田樓)	Housing for Senior Citizens	2000
Cheung Tin House (昌田樓)	Harmony 1	2000
Shing Tin House (盛田樓)	Harmony 1	2000
Tai Tin House (太田樓)	New Harmony 1	2004
Lai Tin House (麗田樓)	New Harmony 1	2004
Wan Tin House (運田樓)	New Harmony 1	2004

== Pak Tin Commercial Complex ==
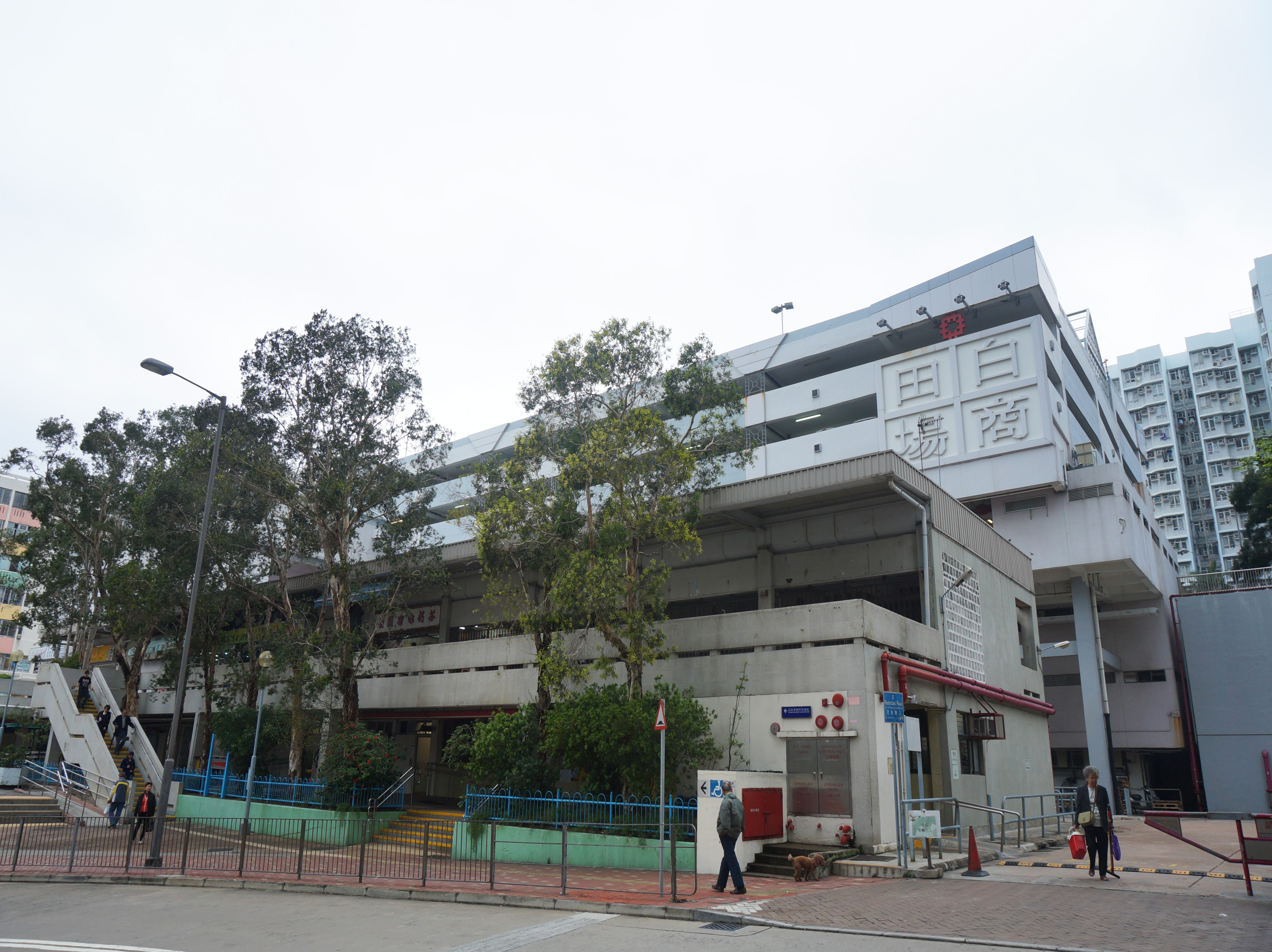
Pak Tin Commercial Complex

Pak Tin Commercial Complex (Chinese: 白田商場) is located in Pak Tin Estate, Sham Shui Po. It was built right at the time, when the 17 residential blocks of Pak Tin Estate were built. It is a 3-storey building and this property is managed by Synergis Management Services Limited.

The complex comprises 14 shops, four cooked food stalls and 69 market stalls with a total lettable area of around 2 000 square metres. In addition, there are 32 shops and 12 shop stalls on the ground level of the domestic blocks in Pak Tin Estate.

Pak Tin Commercial Complex is easily accessible. There is a car park inside the complex with 335 parking spaces and three other car parks at Pak Tin Estate which consist of 354 parking spaces. It is well served by public transport including many bus routes. The MTR Shek Kip Mei station is nearby and a bus terminal is located in Pak Tin Estate.

Year of Completion:	1979
No. of Floor(s):	3
Total Lettable Area (m^{2}):	2 000

== See also ==
- Public housing estates in Shek Kip Mei
- Shek Kip Mei Park
