= Nam Shan Estate =

Housing estate in Shek Kip Mei, Hong Kong

- Chinese: 南山邨
- Cantonese Yale: Nàahm sāan chyūn
Transcriptions
Yue: Cantonese
- Yale Romanization: Nàahm sāan chyūn
- Jyutping: Naam4 saan1 cyun1

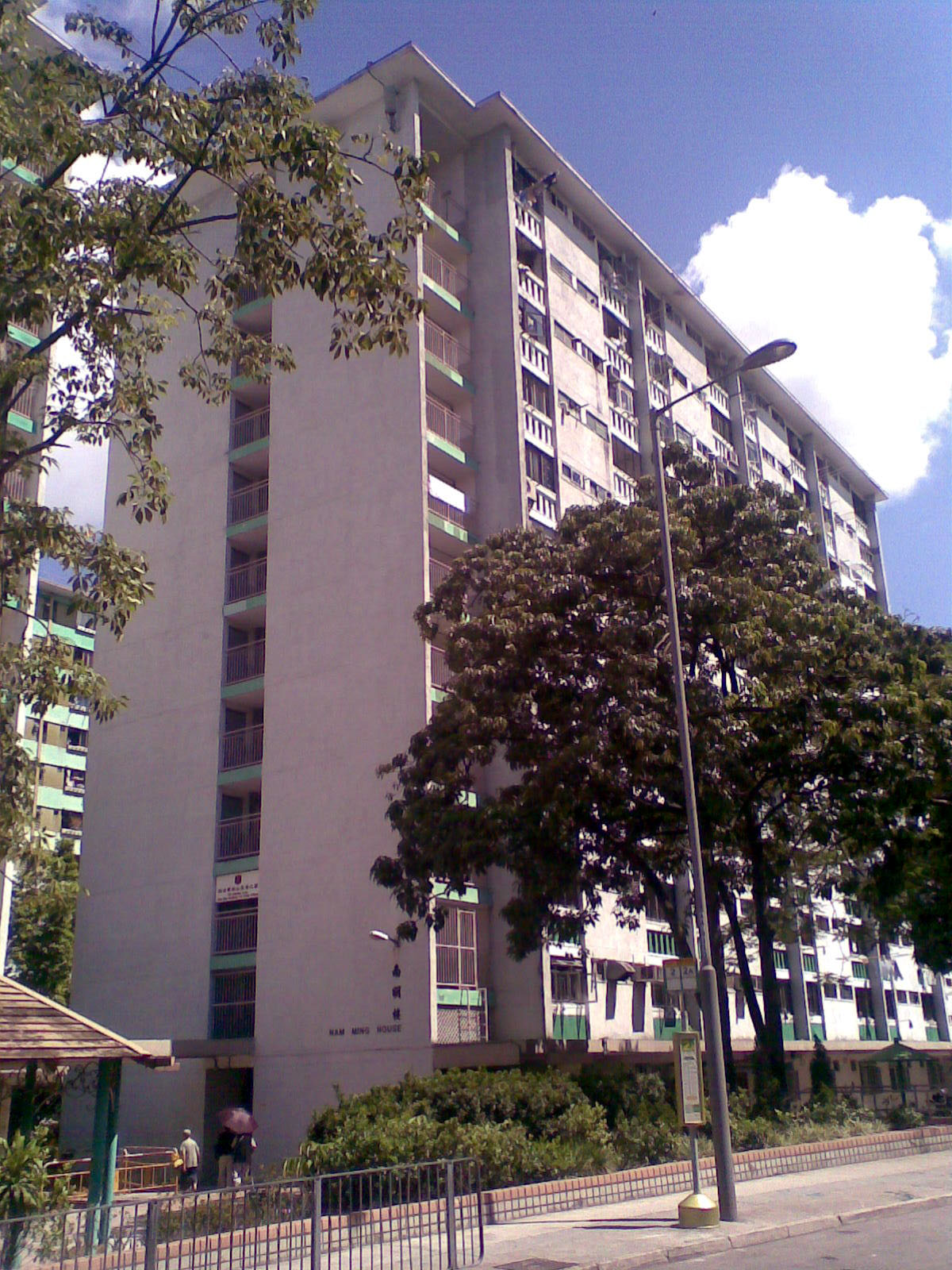
Nam Ming House, Nam Shan Estate

Nam Shan Estate is a public housing estate in Shek Kip Mei, Hong Kong, located near Tai Hang Tung Estate, Tai Hang Sai Estate, Yau Yat Tsuen and City University of Hong Kong. The estate is located at Shek Kip Mei and was formerly called "Kowloon Tsai". It comprises 8 residential blocks built in 1977. The apartments are self-contained units with private kitchen and toilet facilities.

== History ==
Nam Shan Estate is located at the former squatter area of Shek Kip Mei. The estate was built for the rehousing of residents affected by the redevelopment of the Tai Hang Tung estate after the fire at the squatter area of the old Tai Hang Tung estate. Its construction began in 1975 and started intake in 1977.

== Houses ==
Name	Type	Completion
Nam Fung House	Old Slab	1977
Nam On House	Old Slab	1977
Nam Wai House	Old Slab	1977
Nam Lok House	Old Slab	1977
Nam Ming House	Old Slab	1978
Nam Tai House	Old Slab	1978
Nam Yiu House	Old Slab	1978
Nam Yat House	Old Slab	1979

== Facilities ==
- Nam Shan Estate Market
- Nam Shan Shopping Centre
- Nam Shan Estate Multi-storey car park
- Nam Shan General Out-patient Clinic
- Nam Shan District Kai-Fong Welfare Association
- Yang Memorial Methodist Social Service Nam Shan Supported Hostel

== Food in Nam Shan Estate ==
As time passes by, changes occur in the historic estate. Yet, due to the wide age range of residents, Nam Shan Estate stays a mixed culture of past and now.

=== Noodles ===
Old Hong Kong fashion restaurants have been selling local cart noodle since the 1970s. Local toppings, such as pig skin, Chinese radish and fish balls are offered over eras.

=== Ice-cream ===
Ice cream vendors began selling ice-cream from carts in Nam Shan Estate many years ago up until now. Traditional iced-pineapple could also be found from these vendors.

=== Night hawkers ===
At night, hawkers with food carts will gather in Nam Shan Estate selling local food. Food carts are one of the unique food cultures in Hong Kong. Hawkers would prepare food on their own carts and sell them upon order.

=== Egg waffle ===
Freshly made Egg waffles could be found in areas of Nam Shan Estate and is popular among the neighbourhood

=== Curry sauce squid and barbecue meat ===
Solely produced squid sticks and barbecue meat which are made with local recipes are available.

=== Dim Sum ===
Traditional Chinese dim sum are sold at mid-night in Nam Shan Estate.

=== Chinese restaurants ===
Traditional Chinese restaurants could be found in Nam Shan Estate, providing low-priced local food to the neighbourhood.

== Nam Shan Estate and City University of Hong Kong ==
=== Food and shops ===
Nam Shan Estate has a nickname called ‘City University’s canteen’ since the old estate is close to the University which is within 10 minutes on feet and many students dine there. The amount of snack stores is also one of the reasons why Nam Shan Estate got its nickname. Nam Shan Estate is also one of the places where students of City University of Hong Kong purchase stationery for academic purpose since there are few stationery shops available within the area.

=== Academic use for City University of Hong Kong ===
In 2012, due to the construction work City University of Hong Kong is having, in order to relieve the overpopulation problem, City University of Hong Kong rent about half of the parking lot in Nam Shan Estate, reconstructed the top four floors as academic classrooms and remain running of carpark on the lowest four floors.

Before renting the parking lot to City University of Hong Kong, the Hong Kong Housing Authority has consulted and received the approval from the Sham Shui Po District Council and Nam Shan Estate Committee. The Town Planning Board has also authorized the alternation of the parking lot, the area for academic use and related facilities is approximately 3900 square meter. Total 260 parking space has been reserved and is claimed that it is sufficient to satisfy the daily consumption.

== Transportation ==
Nam Shan Estate is located near the exit B2 of Shek Kip Mei station and could be reached within 10 minutes walk.

== Demographics ==
According to the 2016 by-census, Nam Shan Estate had a population of 6,592. The median age was 49.7 and the majority of residents (96.8 per cent) were of Chinese ethnicity. The average household size was 2.4 people. The median monthly household income of all households (i.e. including both economically active and inactive households) was HK$18,000.

== Politics ==
Nam Shan Estate is located in Nam Shan, Tai Hang Tung & Tai Hang Sai constituency of the Sham Shui Po District Council. It was formerly represented by Tam Kwok-kiu, who was elected in the 2019 elections until July 2021.

== See also ==
- Public housing estates in Shek Kip Mei
