= Tai Hang Sai Estate =

Housing estate in Hong Kong

Coordinates: 22.3323°N 114.1696°E

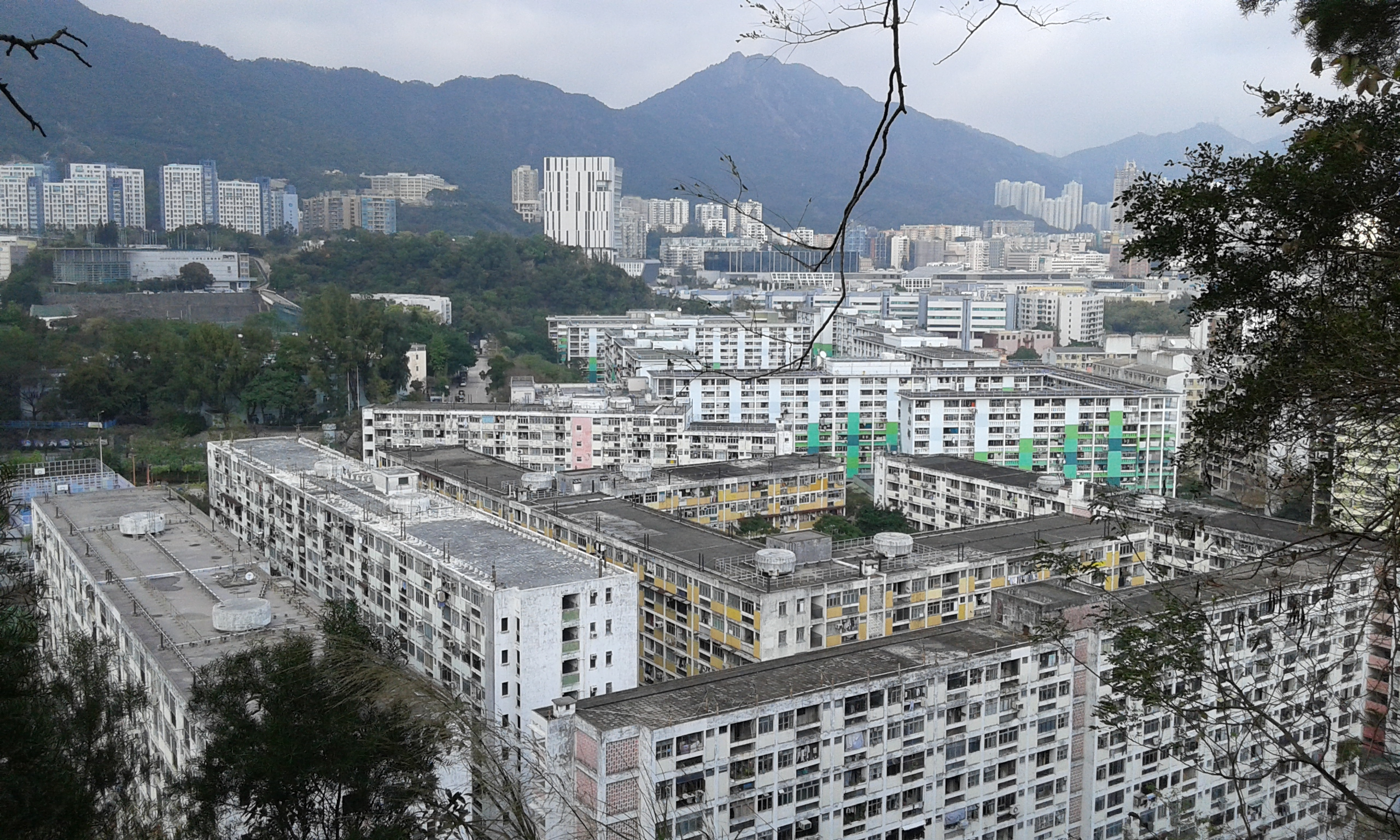
Tai Hang Sai Estate (foreground) viewed from Woh Chai Shan.

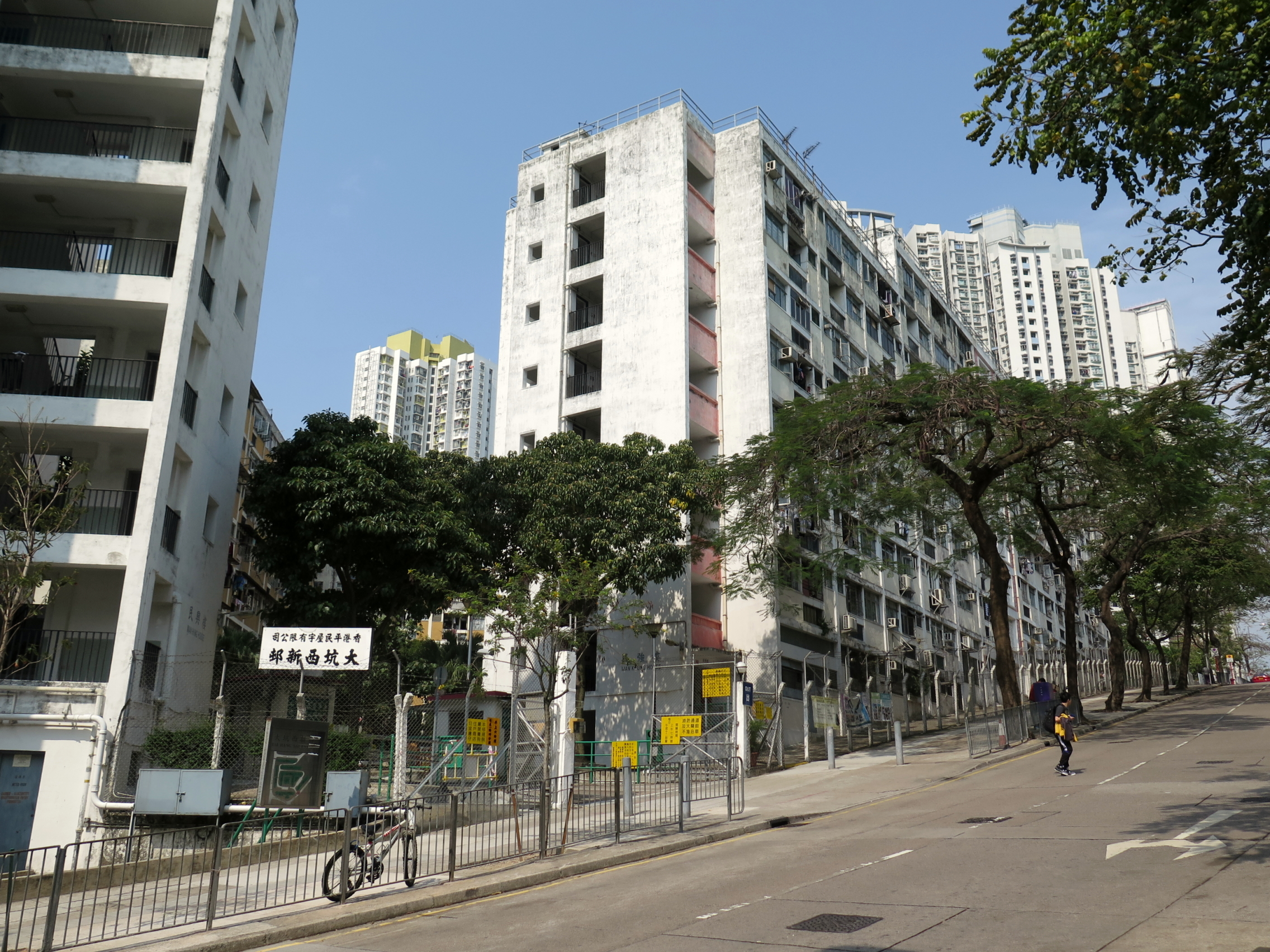
Tai Hang Sai Estate

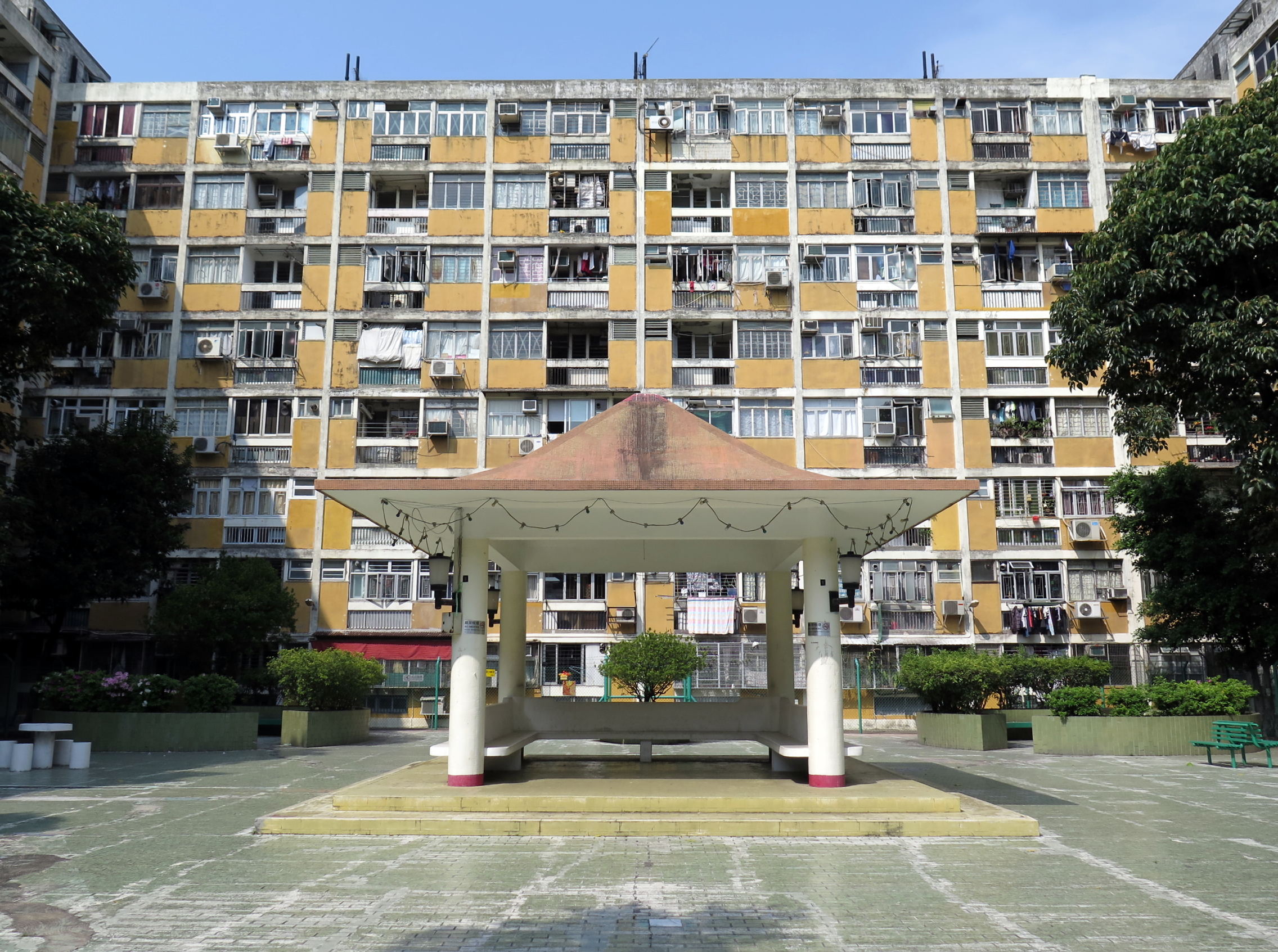
Tai Hang Sai Estate

Tai Hang Sai Estate (Chinese: 大坑西邨) is a private housing estate in Shek Kip Mei, Kowloon, Hong Kong. It is located between Shek Kip Mei Estate and Tai Hang Tung Estate, near MTR Shek Kip Mei station. It consists of 8 residential buildings which were built in 1965 and 1977 respectively. Although it is rental housing, it was developed by a privately owned company, unlike other public housing estates which are built and managed by either Hong Kong Housing Authority or Hong Kong Housing Society.

== History ==
In 1961, the British Hong Kong Government granted a piece of land at concessionary premium to the Hong Kong Settlers Housing Corporation Limited (香港平民屋宇有限公司), founded in 1952 by Dr Lee Iu Cheung and others, to build and then manage the present Tai Hang Sai Estate in order to rehouse tenants affected by clearance of the then Tai Hang Sai Resettlement Area.

In 1965, the Corporation constructed seven buildings with a total of 1603 flats and let them out at rents below market levels to tenants on low incomes. This was the only instance in Hong Kong that Government granted land to a private company to build rental housing.

In 1977, just after the opening of Shek Kip Mei station, the eighth building, Man Tai House, was completed.

== Demographics ==
According to the 2016 census, Tai Hang Sai Estate had a population of 2,639. The median age was 49.4 and the majority of residents (94.8 per cent) were of Chinese ethnicity. The average household size was 2.5 people. The median monthly household income of all households (i.e. including both economically active and inactive households) was HK$28,800.

== Politics ==
Tai Hang Sai Estate is located in Nam Shan, Tai Hang Tung & Tai Hang Sai constituency of the Sham Shui Po District Council. It was formerly represented by Tam Kwok-kiu, who was elected in the 2019 elections until July 2021.

== Redevelopment ==
As early as 2011, the Hong Kong Government along with Hong Kong Settlers Housing Corporation Limited (HKSCL), has been proposing to demolish and redevelop Tai Hang Sai estate into a new low cost housing estate and private housing for sale.

In March 2021, the Hong Kong Government has given approval for HKSCL and the Urban Renewal Authority to jointly implement the Tai Hang Sai Estate Redevelopment project. The project will provide 3,300 units upon completion, 1,300 of which will be used for re-housing the original tenants of Tai Hang Sai Estate, and 2,000 to be sold as private residential flats at a price discounted to market value.

Before the project's proposed completion date in 2029, the affected residents are asked to find temporary housing by themselves, or apply for transitional flats with the help of the area's social work service team.

The residents are also given compensation money as follows:

- For tenants eligible and plan to move back after redevelopment - HK$540,000 in rent subsidies and HK$30,000 compensation for relocation for single persons; HK$864,000 in rent subsidies for a family of four.
- For tenants eligible but plan not to move back after redevelopment - one time grant 25% more than that of returning tenants.
- For tenants ineligible to move back after redevelopment - one time compensation with a minimum of HK$100,000 up to HK$700,000.

== Protests ==
Although some residents support the redevelopment project, many are unsatisfied by the lack of consensus between HKSCL and the residents, the poor treatment of the tenants led to recurring protests by residents and grassroots activists from 2021-2024.

In December 2021, a group of mostly elderly residents and the Residents' Right Concern Group of Tai Hang Sai Estate demonstrated by holding banners and chanting slogans such as: "One house for one house; relocation needs common agreement. We only want to enjoy the old age; we don't want to drift from place to place." The Residents' Right Concern Group of Tai Hang Sai Estate criticized HKSCL for not reaching consensus with the residents before going forward with the redevelopment plan, and when they demanded to meet with the company face to face, they avoided confrontation by only replying written letters.

In August 1 2023, a press conference of over 100 attendees was held by residents to express their concerns. Resident representatives claimed that HKSCL's compensation policy was not enough, that they did not fulfill the condition stated in the plan that proper rehousing arrangements for existing tenants will be provided. In addition, over 80 percent of residents were over 70 years old, many without proof of income, making it very hard to rent a unit. Despite concern groups urging the government to provide residents with public rental housing, the government held firm on the stance that residents of Tai Hang Sai Estate will not be eligible for public rental housing.
