= Tai Hang Tung Estate =

Public housing estate in Hong Kong

Coordinates: 22.3327°N 114.1718°E

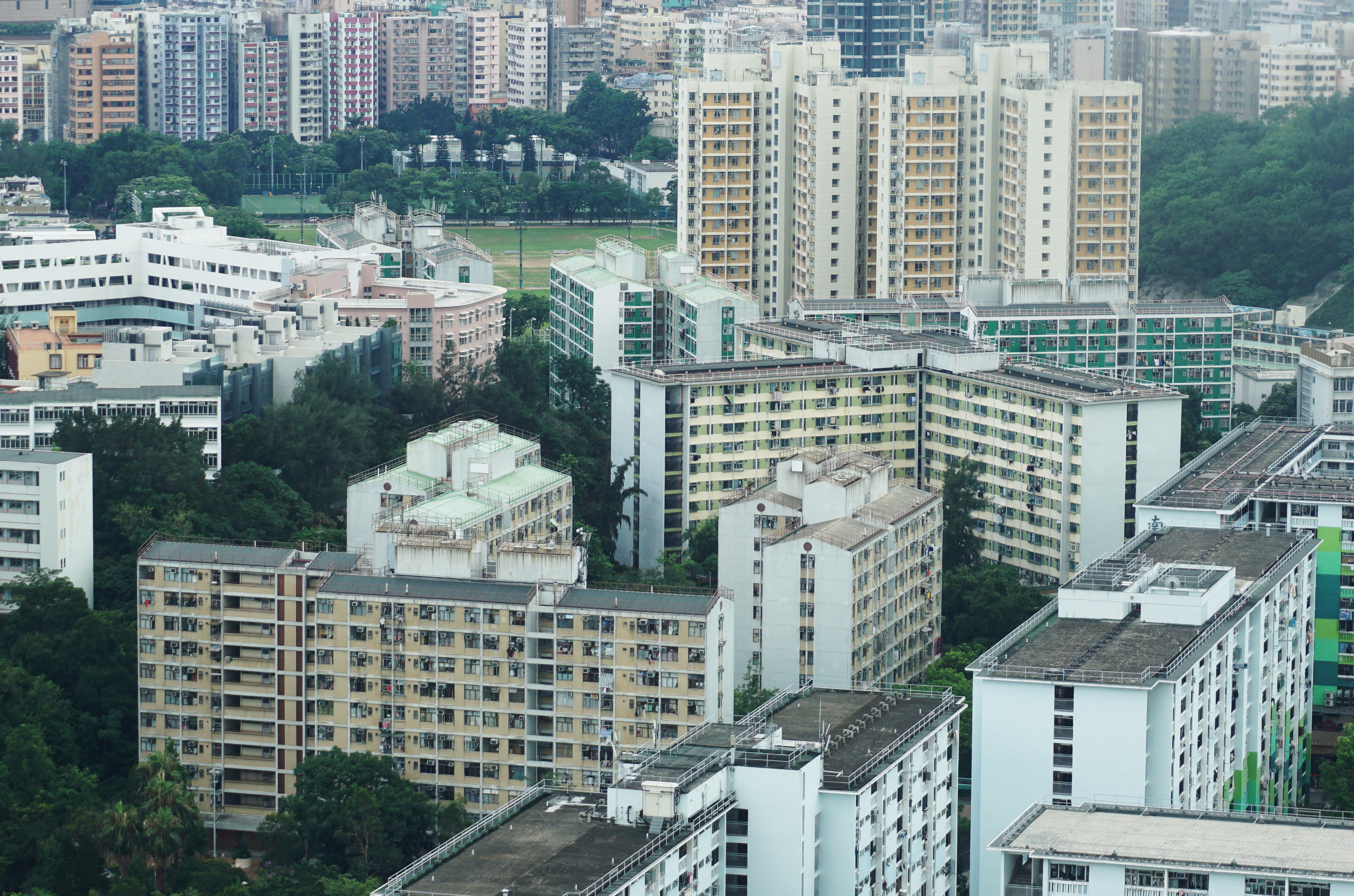
Tai Hang Tung Estate

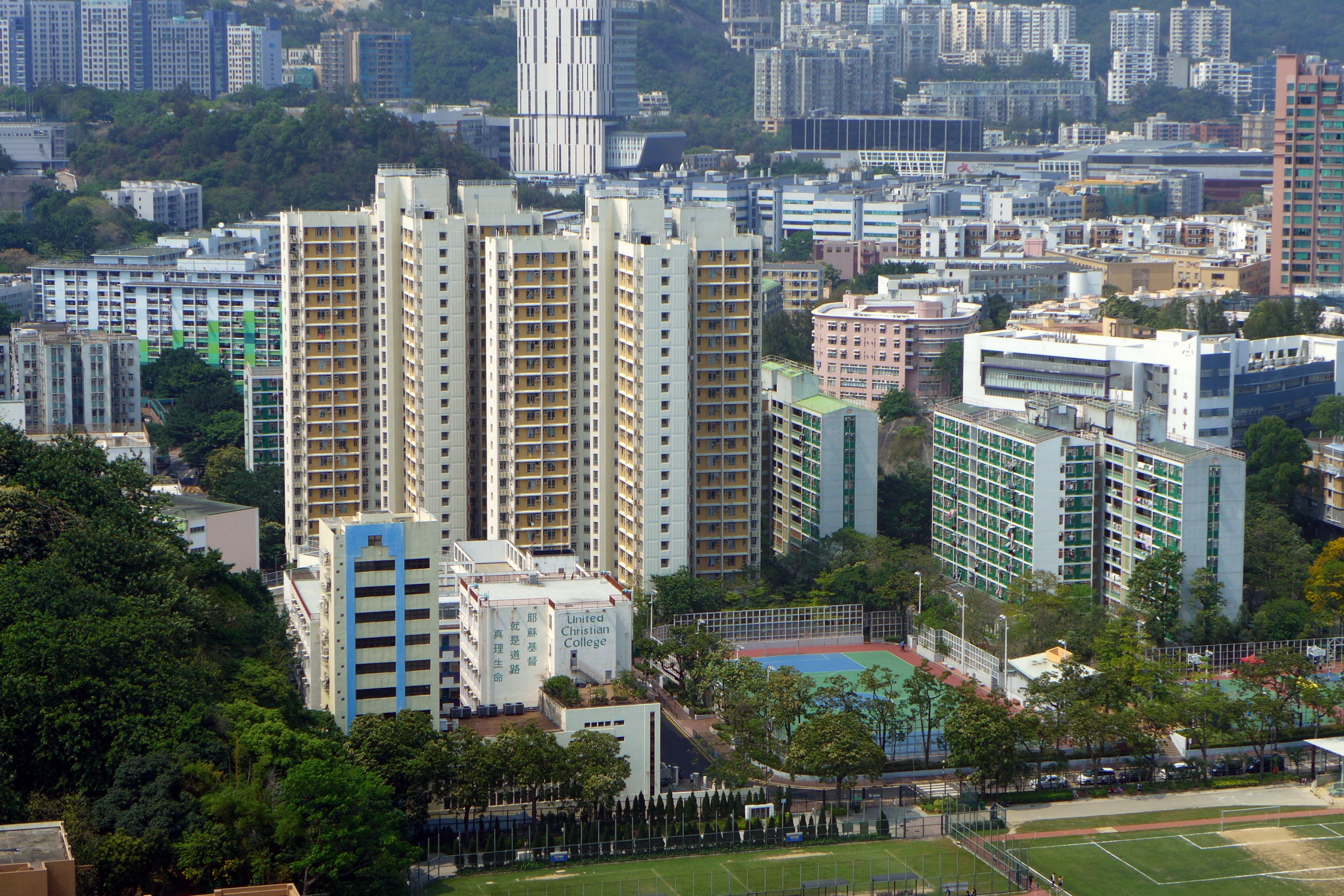
Tai Hang Tung Estate

Tai Hang Tung Estate (Chinese: 大坑東邨) is a public housing estate in Kowloon Tong, Sham Shui Po District, Kowloon, Hong Kong, located near the Tai Hang Sai and Nam Shan Estates as well as Shek Kip Mei station.

== History ==
The Tai Hang Tung Estate was a resettlement estate built by the British Hong Kong government in 1955, after devastating fires broke out in the squatter areas of Tai Hang Tung in 1952 and 1954, and Shek Kip Mei in 1953. The estate started redevelopment and rehabilitation in the 1970s. The first batch of redeveloped buildings were constructed in 1983 and 1986 respectively. The last four old blocks, Tung Fu House, Tung Wing House, Tung Wan House and Tung Wo House, were demolished in 2003. Two buildings in Redevelopment Phase 1, Tung Kin House and Tung Yi House, were built in 2002.

== Houses ==
| Name | Type | Completion |
|---|---|---|
| Tung Lung House | Old Slab | 1983 |
| Tung Fai House | Linear 1 | 1986 |
| Tung Hoi House | Linear 1 | 1986 |
| Tung Moon House | Linear 1 | 1986 |
| Tung Wong House | Linear 1 | 1986 |
| Tung Yu House | Linear 1 | 1986 |
| Tung Shing House | Linear 1 | 1986 |
| Tung Yi House | Small Household Block | 2002 |
| Tung Kin House | Small Household Block | 2002 |

== Demographics ==
According to the 2016 by-census, Tai Hang Tung Estate had a population of 4,562. The median age was 51.2 and the majority of residents (96.8 per cent) were of Chinese ethnicity. The average household size was 2.3 people. The median monthly household income of all households (i.e. including both economically active and inactive households) was HK$19,250.

== Politics ==
Tai Hang Tung Estate is located in Nam Shan, Tai Hang Tung & Tai Hang Sai constituency of the Sham Shui Po District Council. It was formerly represented by Tam Kwok-kiu, who was elected in the 2019 elections until July 2021.

== See also ==
- Public housing in Hong Kong
- Public housing estates in Shek Kip Mei
