= Hong Kong Dragon Garden =

Private heritage garden in Hong Kong

Coordinates: 22.3634°N 114.0510°E

- 龍圃花園
- Interactive map of Hong Kong Dragon Garden
- Type: Chinese garden
- Location: 32-42 Castle Peak Road, Tsing Lung Tau, Sham Tseng, Tuen Mun District, New Territories
- Area: 8 hectares (20 acres)
- Designated

Hong Kong Graded Building – Grade II
- Founder: Lee Iu-cheung
- Owner: Dragon Garden Charitable Trust

Hong Kong Dragon Garden
- Traditional Chinese: 龍圃花園
- Simplified Chinese: 龙圃花园
Transcriptions
Standard Mandarin
- Hanyu Pinyin: lóng pǔ huā yuán
Yue: Cantonese
- Yale Romanization: Lùhng bóu fa yùhn
- Jyutping: Lung4 bou2 fa3 jyun4

The Hong Kong Dragon Garden is an 8 hectares (20 acres) private heritage garden located at No. 32-42 Castle Peak Road, Tsing Lung Tau, in the backdrop of Sham Tseng in the west of the Tsuen Wan District in the New Territories of Hong Kong, founded by Lee Iu-cheung.

It is the biggest existing private park in Hong Kong. This modern-day Chinese garden features architectural design from the Song, Ming and Qing dynasties and is intricately tinted with touches of Buddhist, Taoist and Confucian elements. There are over 100 plant species in the garden, and it is home to more than 30 of likely the largest Buddhist pines in the city. It is also open to the public for guided tours.

== History ==
In 1949, Lee Iu Cheung purchased a barren hill in the New Territories from the Hong Kong Government. Lee spent the next 20 years planning, designing and landscaping the garden.

In July 2006, news surfaced that Dragon Garden was to be sold to developers after 60 years of private maintenance. Hong Kong's Conservancy Association appealed to the Town Planning Board against its demolition, claiming that the mansion ought to be kept as an edifice of heritage. On 25 September 2006, the garden was recognized as a Grade II Heritage Site by the Hong Kong Antiquities and Monuments Office.

In January 2008, Lee Shiu, youngest son of Lee Iu Cheung, expressed frustration towards the Hong Kong Government because it was stalling the finalization of its official agreement with him. Lee planned to present Dragon Garden to Hong Kong as a public park. However, the stalemate resulted from the government's reluctance to shoulder the cost of the garden's maintenance, which included restoring the garden's structures and installing visitor facilities to allow public touring. The Development Bureau said that the government welcomed the proposal of the Dragon Garden's donation to the public, but still needed more time to further negotiate with Lee on the best way to revitalize the garden.

In 2016, operational management of the garden was taken over by Lumina College, a private Christian academy, which maintained the site as a rural campus and organized guided tours for the public.. The collaboration completed in 2021 and management of the garden was returned to its owner.

== Description ==
The Dragon Garden integrates architectural features of both the East and the West. Apart from the characteristics of Sung, Ming and Qing dynasties and the influences from Confucianism, Buddhism and Taoism, it also incorporates some Western elements into the architecture. For example, the two colorful glass windows in the ancestral hall resemble a Catholic church. However, the clouds, birds and rectangular patterns on the windows are in Chinese style. Yet, the oil paintings are also Western-influenced.

Like other traditional Chinese gardens, the architecture of the Dragon Garden symbolizes the unity of man and nature. Following Chinese feng shui tradition, the order of nature is maintained in the garden so that it does not look wild or chaotic. The landscape is a miniature of the natural landscape with hills and valleys, bridges and rivers, winding paths, rock gardens and plants. The roofs of the ancestral hall and the pavilion are curved with the four corners pointing upward, which imitates the contour of nature. The wide and flat architectural design contrasts with the tall and slender buildings of the West.

The preservation of the garden's natural environment is inspired by the Chinese value of living in nature with fear and respect, never trying to intimidate it or challenge its power. The design of the Dragon Garden also follows the concept of harmony and balance. If divided into two equal halves, the ancestral hall and the pavilion appear identical from the inside and outside.

The animals on the four corners of the pavilion are mascots of luck and intend to protect people in the house against evil spirits. Technically, however, the little animals are used to cover the nail holes that secure the half-cylinder shaped tiles to the eaves. This prevents the wood structure from rotting.

In many ways, the architecture of the Garden is a reflection of Dr. Lee's life and the influences he received. The balanced blend of Chinese and Western influences reveal Dr. Lee's cultural upbringing as a Chinese as well as the time he spent studying in the United States and interacting with British officials in Hong Kong.

== Ownership ==
=== Founder – Dr. Lee Iu Cheung ===
Born in Hong Kong to a migrant family from Guangdong Province, China, Lee Iu-cheung (1896–1976) spent his childhood in the Sheung Wan district. Lee was awarded the Lugard Scholarship upon passing all his Cambridge University local examinations held in Hong Kong. He then joined the Faculty of Engineering at the University of Hong Kong (HKU) in 1913. Lee left for Cornell University, where he enrolled in a special study on River Conservancy and Sanitary engineering in 1919. However, upon the death of his father, he abandoned his studies and returned to Hong Kong, where Lee became a part-time lecturer in Hydraulic Engineering at his alma mater.

Dr. Lee served as a permanent advisor of the Tung Wah Group of Hospitals for 29 years. He received a Member of the Order of the British Empire) from King George VI in 1949. He was awarded an O.B.E (Officer of the Order of the British Empire) in 1952 and a C.B.E (Commander of the Order of the British Empire) in 1958 by Queen Elizabeth II. He was also conferred a LL.D. (honoris causa) by HKU in 1969.

== Dragon Garden Charitable Trust ==
In July 2006, Dr. Lee Iu Cheung's granddaughter, Cynthia Lee Hong Yee founded the Dragon Garden Charitable Trust after the garden was saved from being bought over by developers. Instigated by the preservation of the garden, the Trust aims to "preserve cultural and heritage property in Hong Kong, for public benefit." The Trust holds a number of activities, including guided walks, thematic talks, heritage exhibitions and sponsorships of student conservation projects. The Trust actively seeks to re-examine Hong Kong's outdated Antiquities and Monuments Ordinance in order to protect and preserve Hong Kong's cultural assets.

=== Trust sponsored events ===
==== Bi-city Biennale of Urbanism \ Architecture 2009 ====
The Trust was an Events Partner of the Hong Kong & Shenzhen Bi-city Biennale of Urbanism \ Architecture 2009, which was held in West Kowloon Waterfront Promenade from December 2009 to February 2010. Its sponsorship to the biennale followed its motto of elevating public concern on heritage preservation.

==== Dragon Garden Art Exhibition 2010 ====
In March 2010, the Dragon Garden Charitable Trust organised a fund-raising Art Exhibition at the Cat Gallery in Sheung Wan, where featured artists were commissioned to draw their inspiration from and present their vision of the Dragon Garden. All of the artworks were sold at the exhibition in aid of the conservation of the Dragon Garden heritage. Kay Tse, a famous local singer, helped the charity gain publicity as she worked with Olaf Mueller, one of the featured artists in his photo shoots and attended the opening of the Art Exhibition.

== Outlook ==
Meanwhile, the Leisure and Cultural Services Department has also expressed concern over the Trust's proposal as it involves not only the restoration of existing buildings as a heritage site but also the construction of new facilities for exhibition, organic farming, wedding and educational purposes. The fixed costs of implementing this proposal approximate HK$30 million, as evaluated by Wai-hung Cheng, surveyor and member of the Advisory Committee on Revitalisation of Historic Buildings.

== Access ==
Dragon Garden is located along Castle Peak Road, not near any MTR station. The closest is Tsuen Wan station on the Tsuen Wan line. At the station, the road is situated at the southern exit.

== In popular culture ==
The Dragon Garden was featured in The Man with the Golden Gun, a James Bond movie released in 1974, starring Roger Moore as James Bond. There are about twenty minutes of scenes with Dragon Garden as a backdrop. The Garden was also featured in Noble House
