= Shek Kip Mei Park =

Public park in Shek Kip Mei, Hong Kong

Coordinates: 22.3360°N 114.1698°E

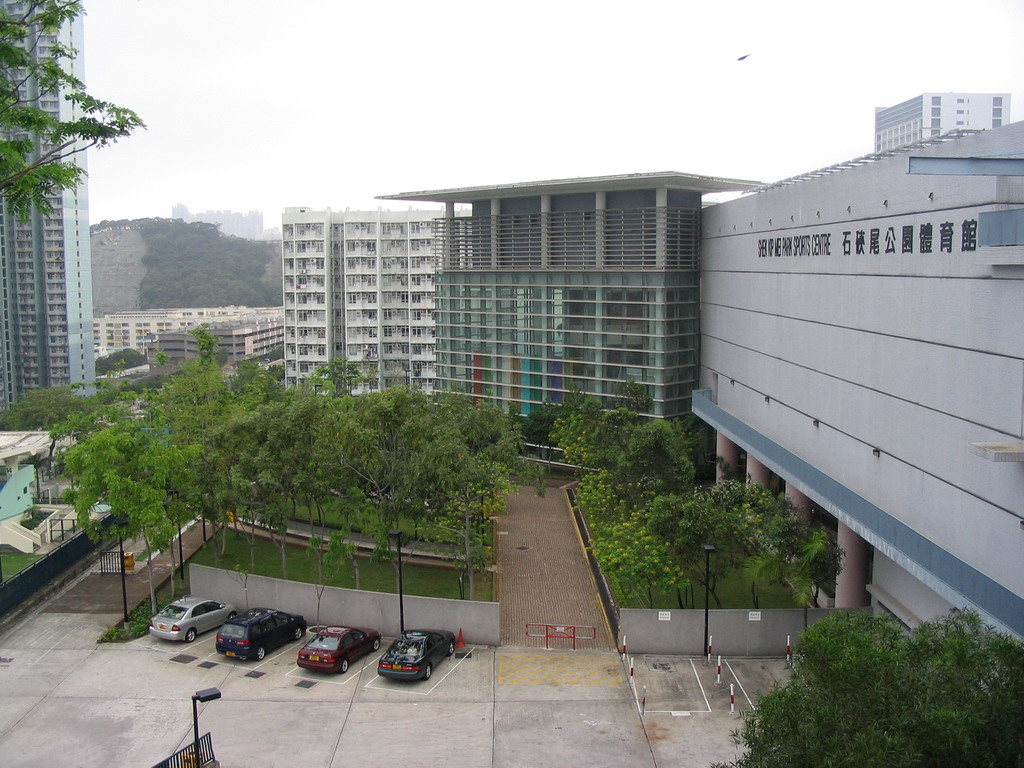
Shek Kip Mei Park Sports Centre

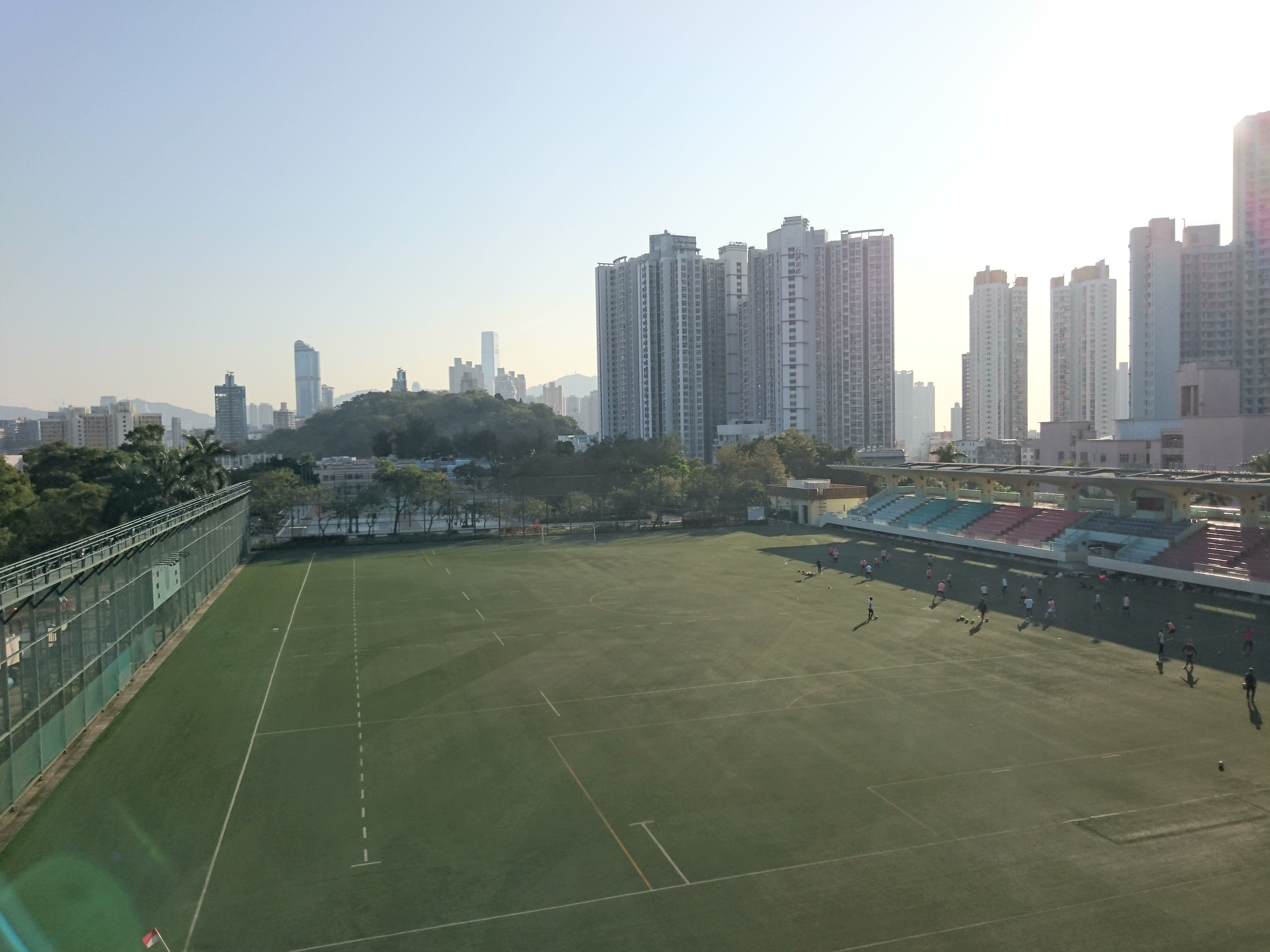
Shek Kip Mei Park

Shek Kip Mei Park (Chinese: 石硤尾公園) is an urban park located in Shek Kip Mei, Hong Kong near an area noted for its temporary housing built on a hillside. It is one of the largest parks in Sham Shui Po.

== Facilities ==
There is an indoor sports centre with a fitness room, activity rooms, and a children playroom.

Amenities include an outdoor artificial climbing wall, tennis courts, children's playground, fountain, artificial waterfall, amphitheatre, mini-soccer pitch with colour-coated hard surface, two colour-coated basketball courts, jogging track with fitness stations and a rest garden.

There is a natural grass rugby-cum-soccer pitch with a 1,446 person capacity spectator stand.

== See also ==
- Shek Kip Mei Estate
- List of urban public parks and gardens in Hong Kong
