= Lee Iu-cheung =

Dr. Lee Iu Cheung CBE JP (Chinese: 李耀祥, 1896–1976) was a businessman and former educator in Hong Kong, and a prominent philanthropist. In addition to his 29 years' service on the board of the Tung Wah Group of Hospitals, he is best known as the creator of the Dragon Garden.

== Biography ==
Born in Hong Kong to a migrant family from GuangDong Province, China, Lee Iu Cheung (李耀祥) spent his childhood in Sheung Wan district. Lee was awarded the Lugard Scholarship upon passing all his Cambridge University local examinations held in Hong Kong. He entered the Faculty of Engineering at the University of Hong Kong in 1913. After graduating in 1917, he married Chan Yuet King, daughter of a director of the Tung Wah Hospital. Concerned about the floods ravaging the Guangdong Province, Lee left for Cornell University in the United States to undertake a special study on River Conservancy and Sanitary engineering in 1919. However, he was forced to abandon his studies and return to Hong Kong upon his father's death. Upon his return, Lee became a part-time lecturer in Hydraulic Engineering at the University of Hong Kong.

In 1949, Lee purchased a barren hill in the New Territories from the Government of Hong Kong, and spent the next 20 years planning, designing and landscaping the garden known as Dragon Garden.

Dr. Lee is best known for his voluntary service "to about 50 associations and organisations aimed at improving the social and economic conditions of the Hong Kong people, especially after World War II." He joined the board of Kwong Wah Hospital in 1926, was member of the Po Leung Kuk Committee in 1929–30 and became chairman of the Tung Wah Hospital Board of Directors in 1940.

Dr. Lee's awards include an MBE (Member of the Order of the British Empire) by HM King George VI in 1949, an OBE (Officer of the Order of the British Empire) in 1952, and a CBE (Commander of the Order of the British Empire) in 1958, the latter both awarded by HM Queen Elizabeth II. He was also conferred a LL.D. (honoris causa) by his alma mater in 1969.
