= Shek Kip Mei station =

MTR station in Kowloon, Hong Kong

Shek Kip Mei 石硤尾
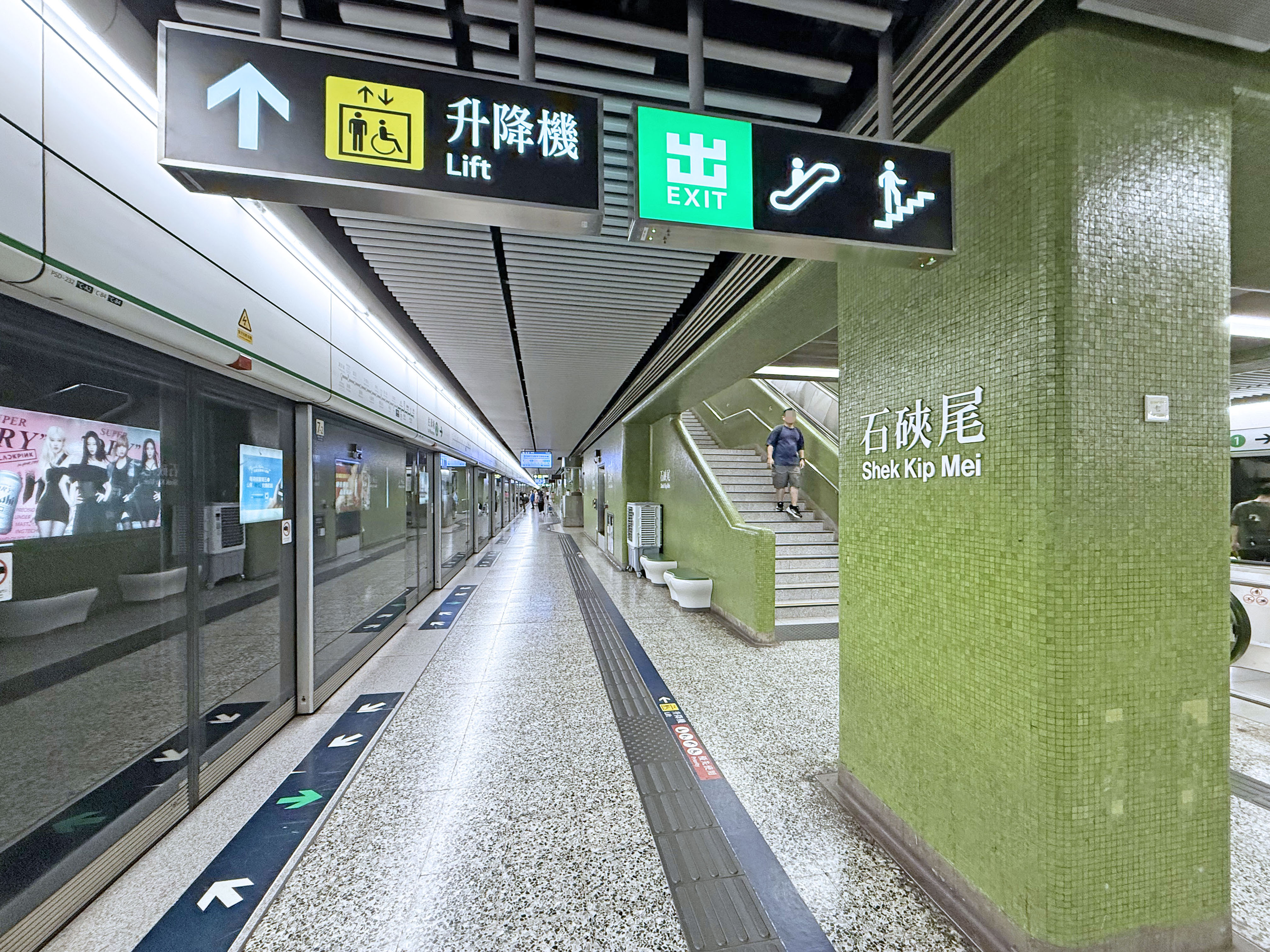
- Platform 2 of Shek Kip Mei station

Chinese name
- Traditional Chinese: 石硤尾
- Simplified Chinese: 石硖尾
- Cantonese Yale: Sehk gip méih
- Literal meaning: Gorge End
Transcriptions
Standard Mandarin
- Hanyu Pinyin: Shíxiáwěi
Yue: Cantonese
- Yale Romanization: Sehk gip méih
- IPA: [sɛk̚˨ kip̚˧ mej˨˧]
- Jyutping: Sek6 gip3 mei5

General information
- Location: Under Wai Chi Street, Shek Kip Mei; Sham Shui Po District, Hong Kong
- Coordinates: 22°19′55″N 114°10′07″E
- System: MTR rapid transit station
- Owner: MTR Corporation
- Operator: MTR Corporation
- Line: Kwun Tong line
- Platforms: 2 (1 island platform)
- Tracks: 2
- Connections: Bus, minibus

Construction
- Structure type: Underground
- Platform levels: 1
- Accessible: yes

Other information
- Station code: SKM

History
- Opened: 1 October 1979; 47 years ago

Services
Preceding station	MTR	Following station
Prince Edward towards Whampoa	Kwun Tong line	Kowloon Tong towards Tiu Keng Leng
Track layout
Location
- Location within MTR

Shek Kip Mei (Chinese: 石硤尾; Cantonese Yale: Sehk gip méih) is a station on the Hong Kong MTR Kwun Tong line. It is located in Shek Kip Mei.

== History ==
The station's construction under Contract 202 was given to Maeda Corporation.

The station served as a terminus of the 2nd phase of the Kwun Tong line (then known as the part of the Modified Initial System) until the services was extended to Tsim Sha Tsui station on 16 December 1979. (Shek Kip Mei to Kwun Tong, 1 October 1979 to 31 December 1979). The first train departed from this station on 1 October 1979.

A lift connecting the concourse and ground floor opposite of exit B was installed and put in service on 30 October 2013.

== Livery ==
The station's livery for the platforms is mainly green and white on the downwards end. For the concourse it is mainly white on both sides of the walls and green for short walls and lift cover. Exits had green, white, and light gray while green is the main color.

== Station layout ==
G	Ground level	Exits
L1	Concourse	Customer service, MTRshops
L1	Concourse	Vending machines, automatic teller machines
L2; Platform	Platform 1	Kwun Tong line towards Tiu Keng Leng (Kowloon Tong) →
L2; Platform	Island platforms, doors will open on the right
L2; Platform	Platform 2	← Kwun Tong line towards Whampoa (Prince Edward)

== Entrances and exits ==
- A: Nam Cheong Street, Shek Kip Mei Market
- B1: Woh Chai Street, Tai Hang Tung Estate
- B2: Woh Chai Street, Nam Shan Estate
- C: Wai Chi Street, Shek Kip Mei Park, Shek Kip Mei Park Sports Centre, Shek Kip Mei Estate
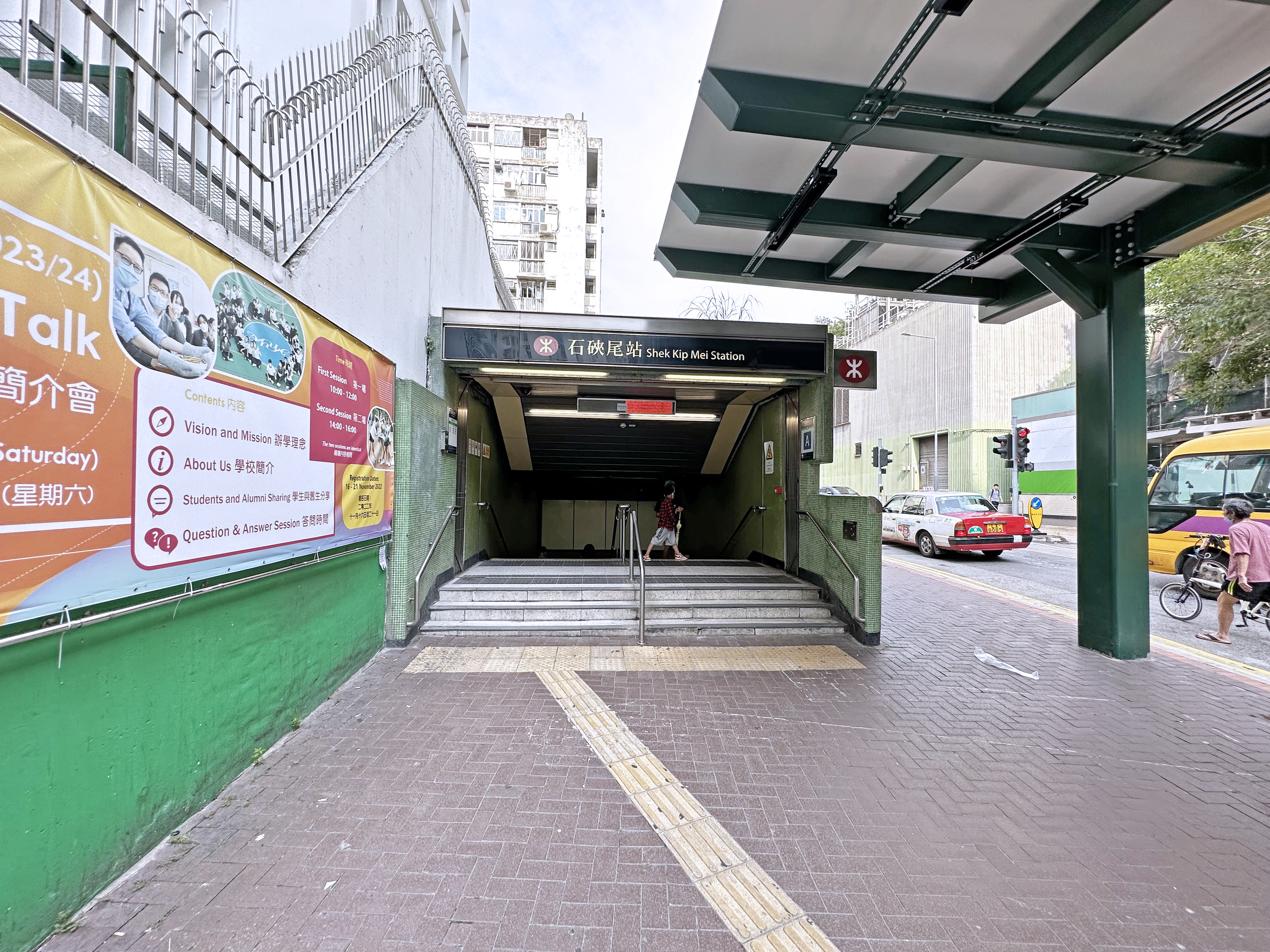
Exit A

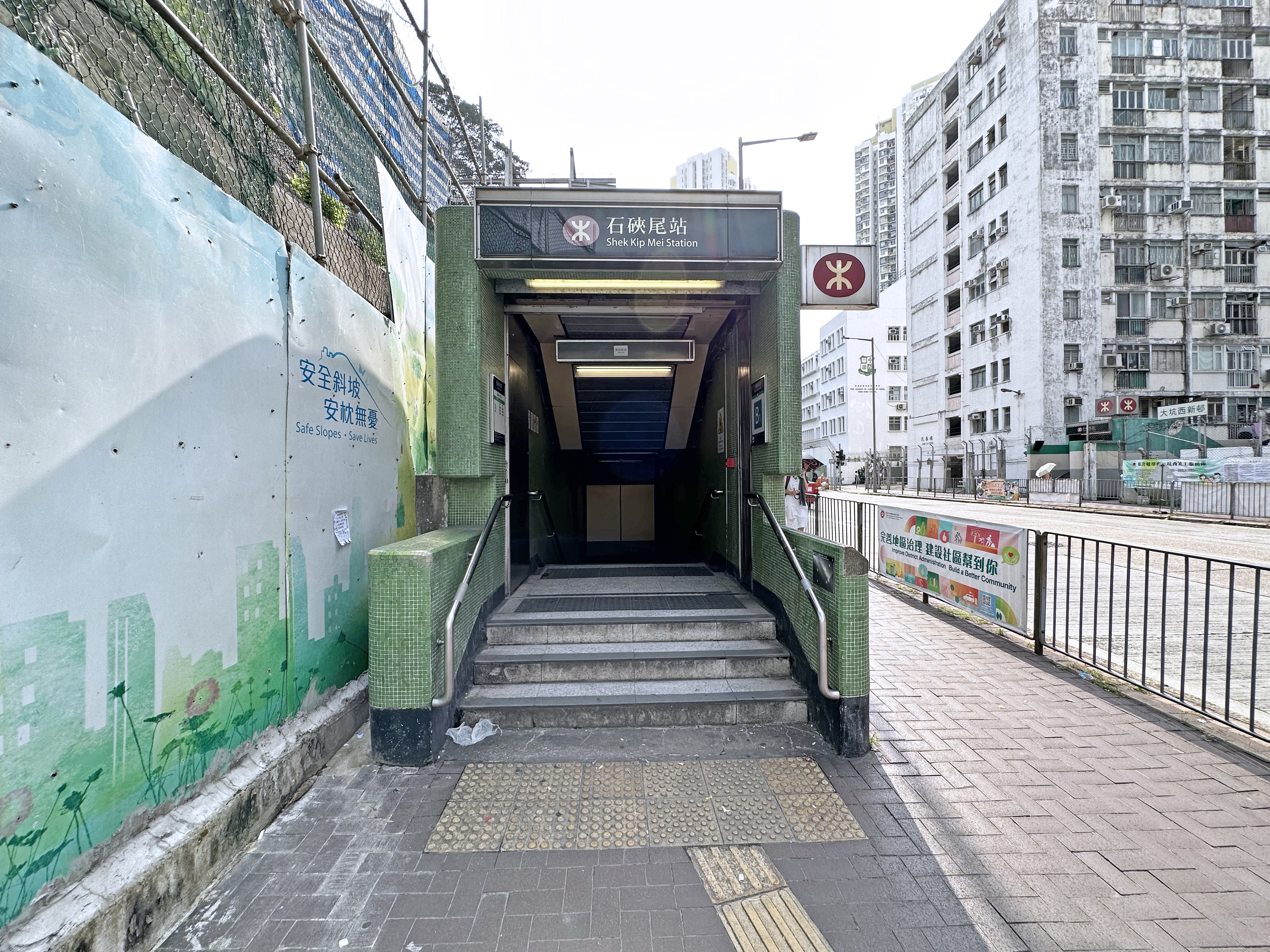
Exit B1

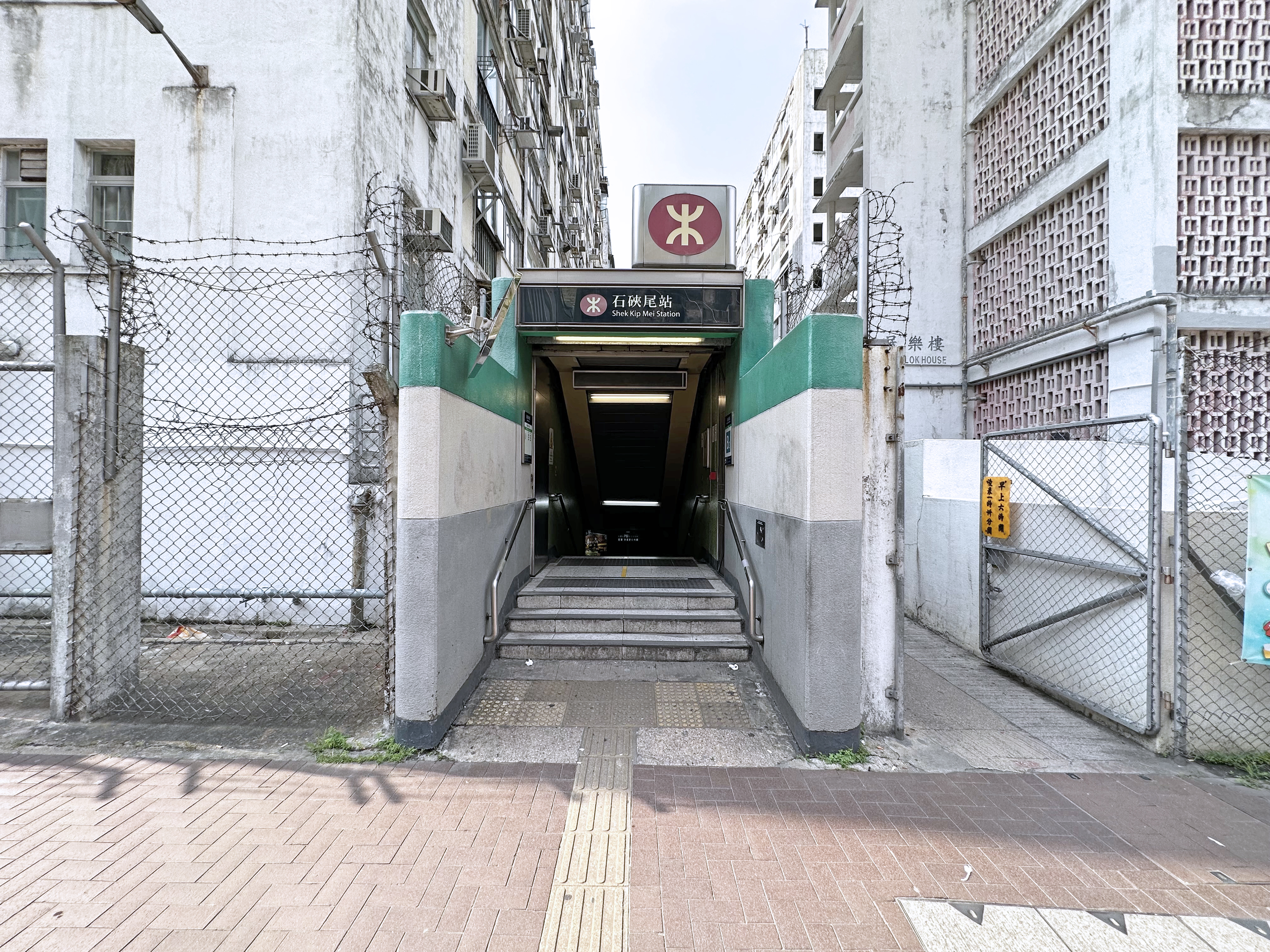
Exit B2

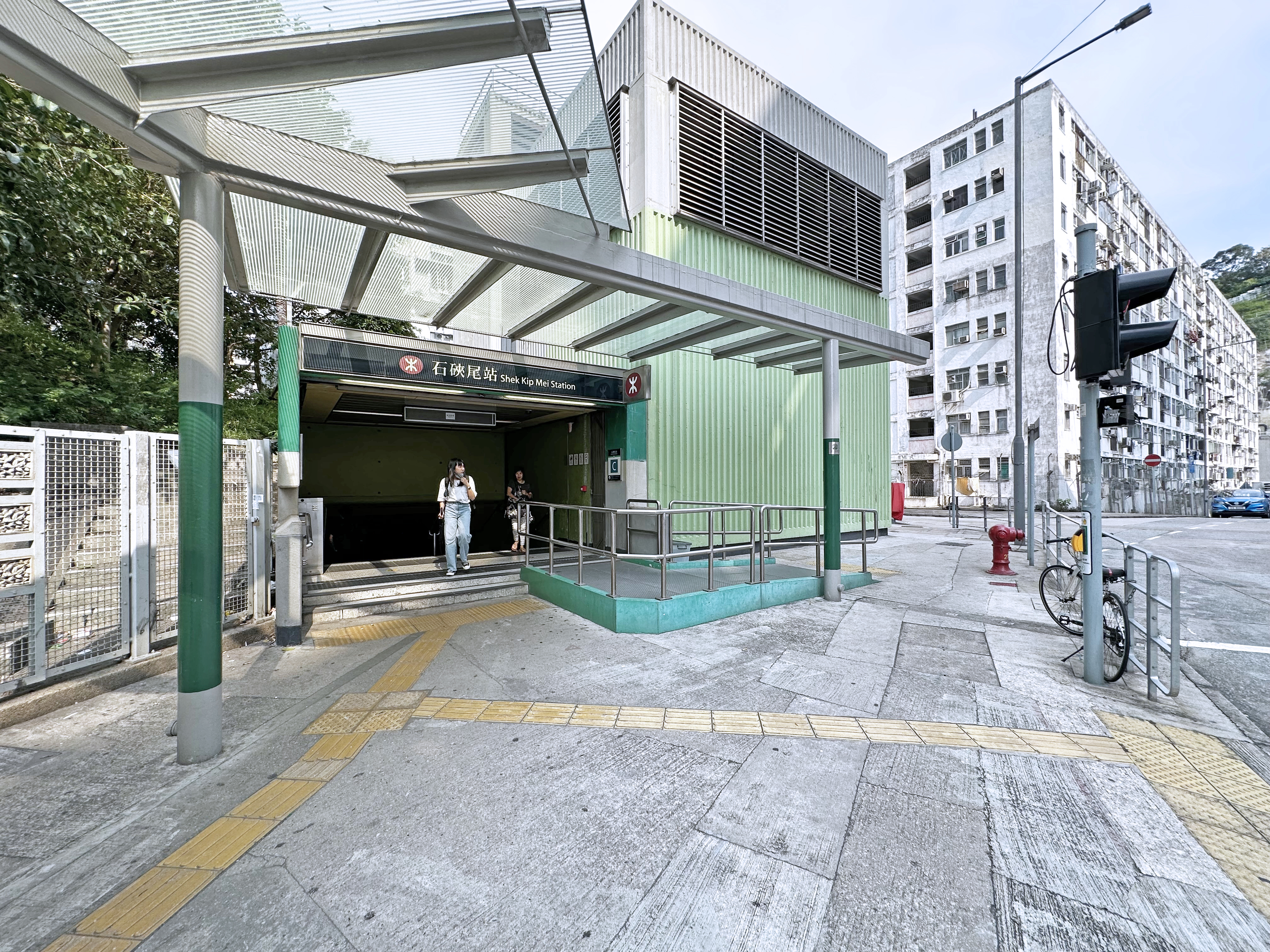
Exit C

== Gallery ==
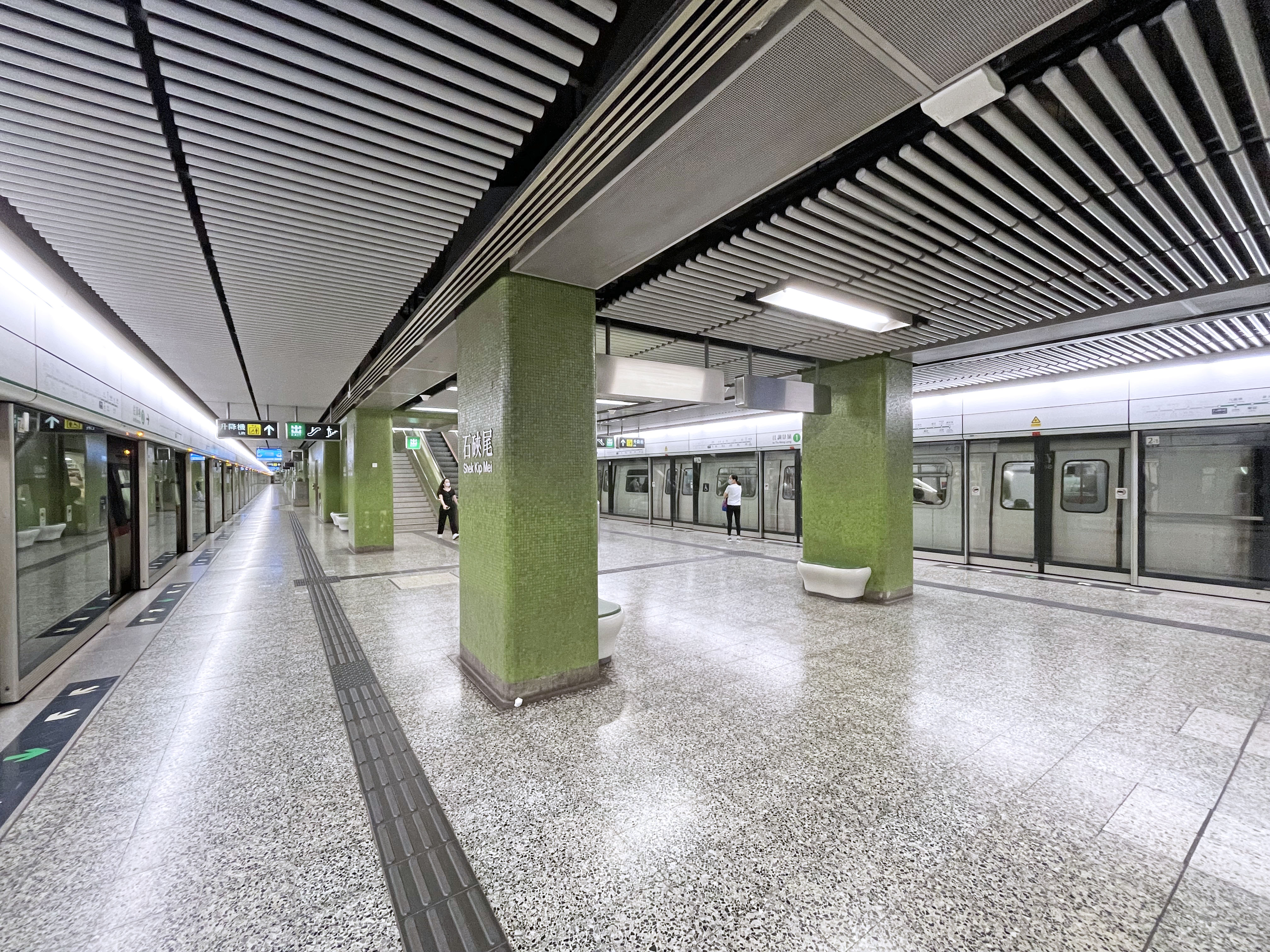
Platforms (2022)

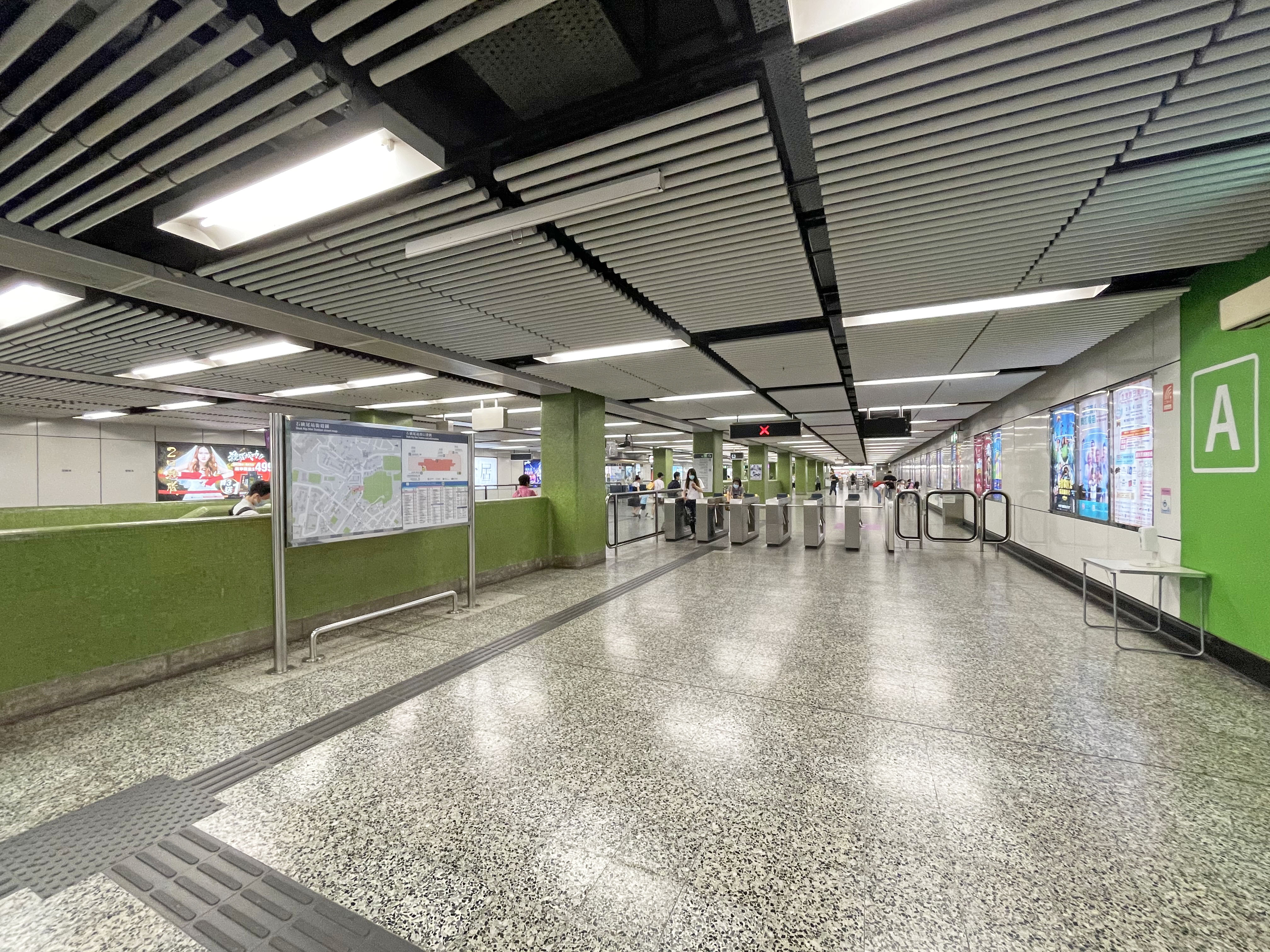
Concourse, near Exit A (2021)

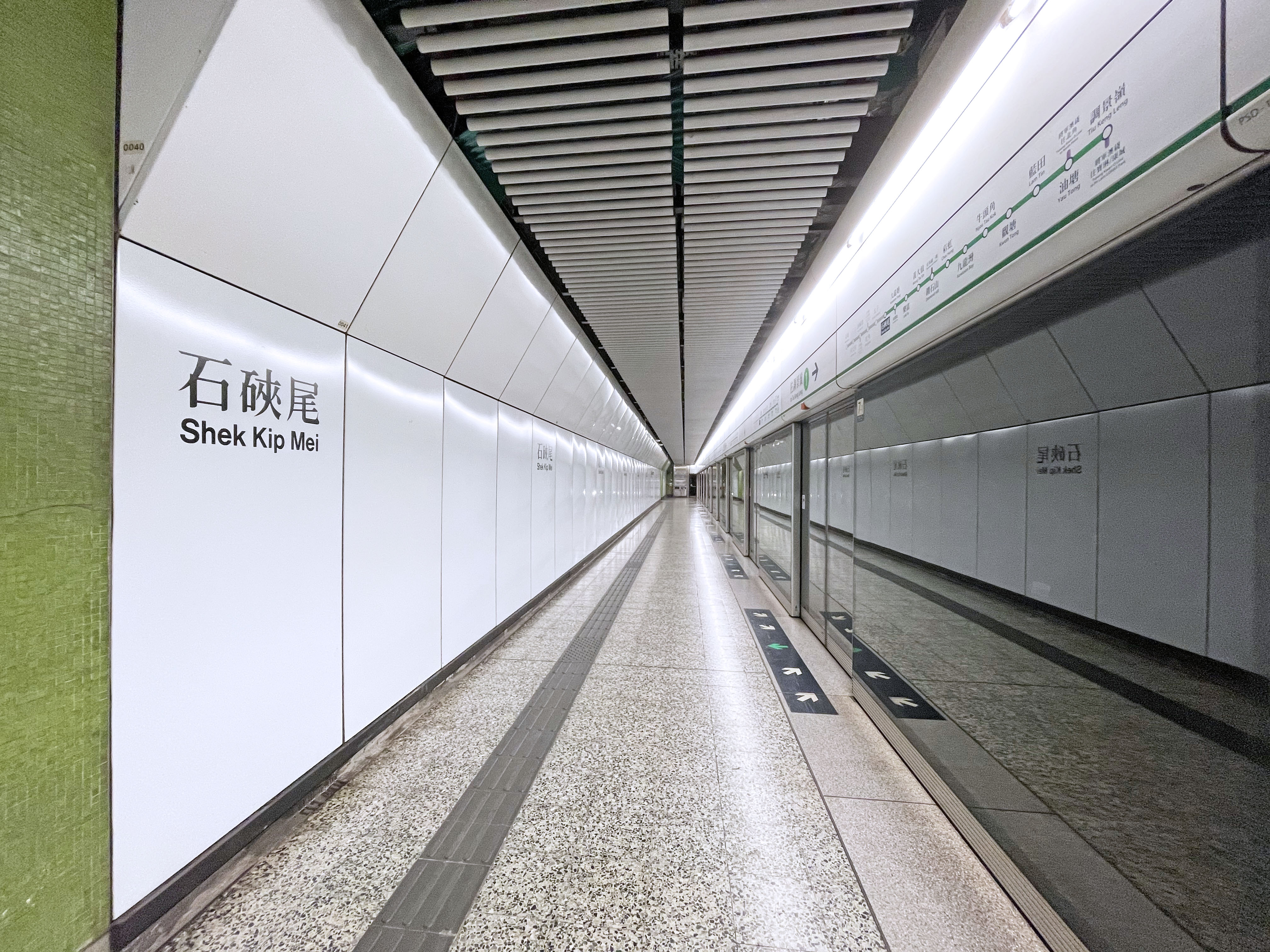
New white panels installed after refurbishment (2021)

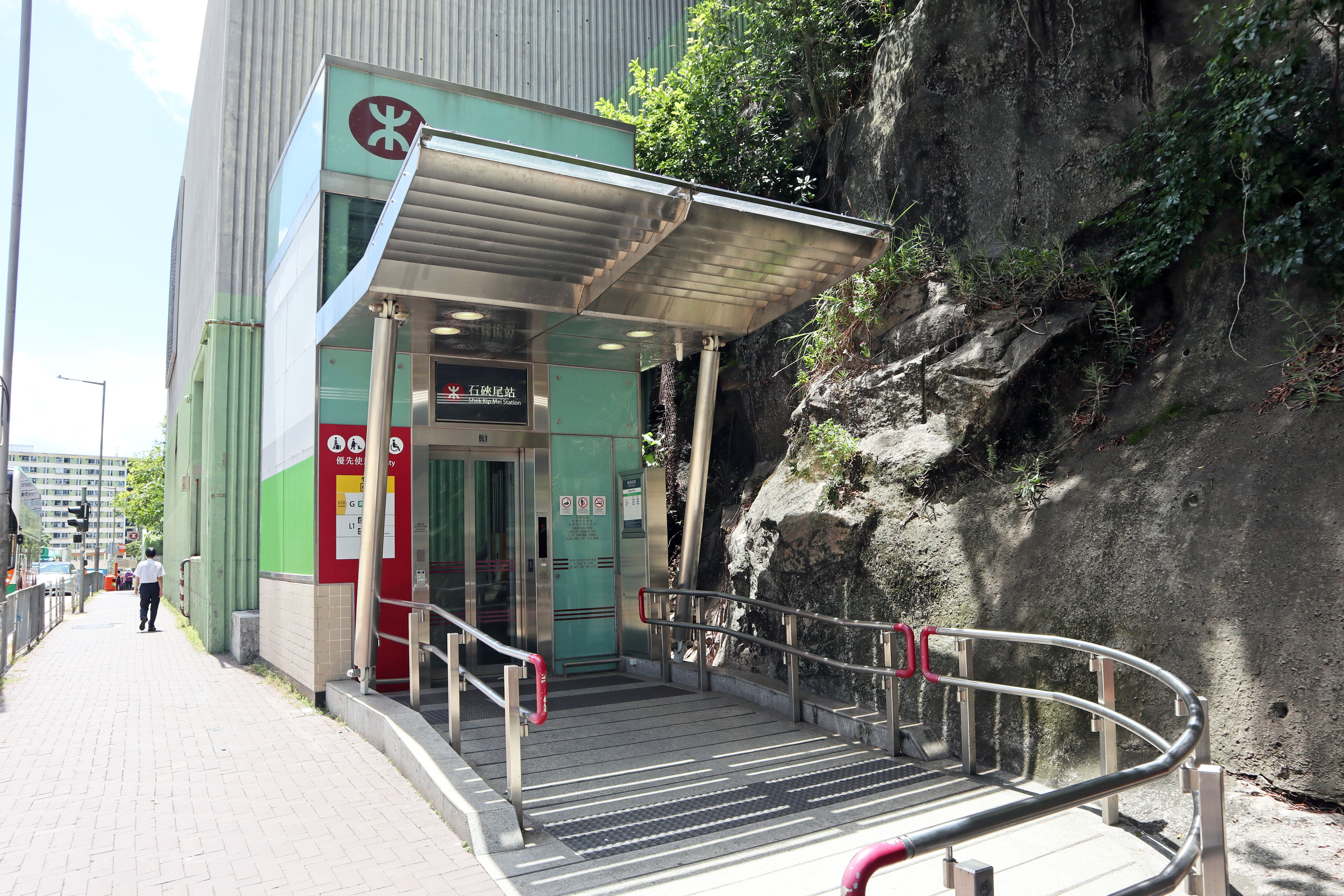
Lift access to the station (2020)

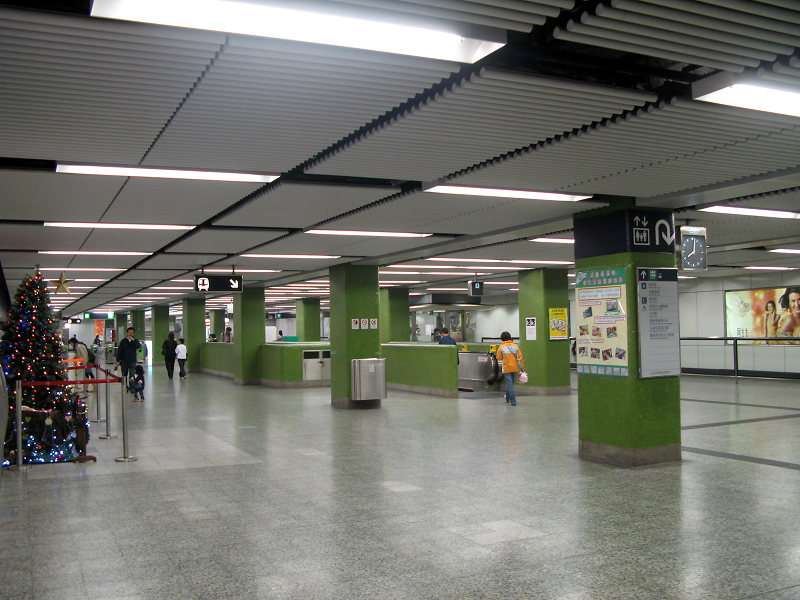
Shek Kip Mei station Concourse in December 2007
