= Shek Kip Mei =

Area in New Kowloon, Kowloon Peninsula, Hong Kong

Coordinates: 22.33426°N 114.16881°E

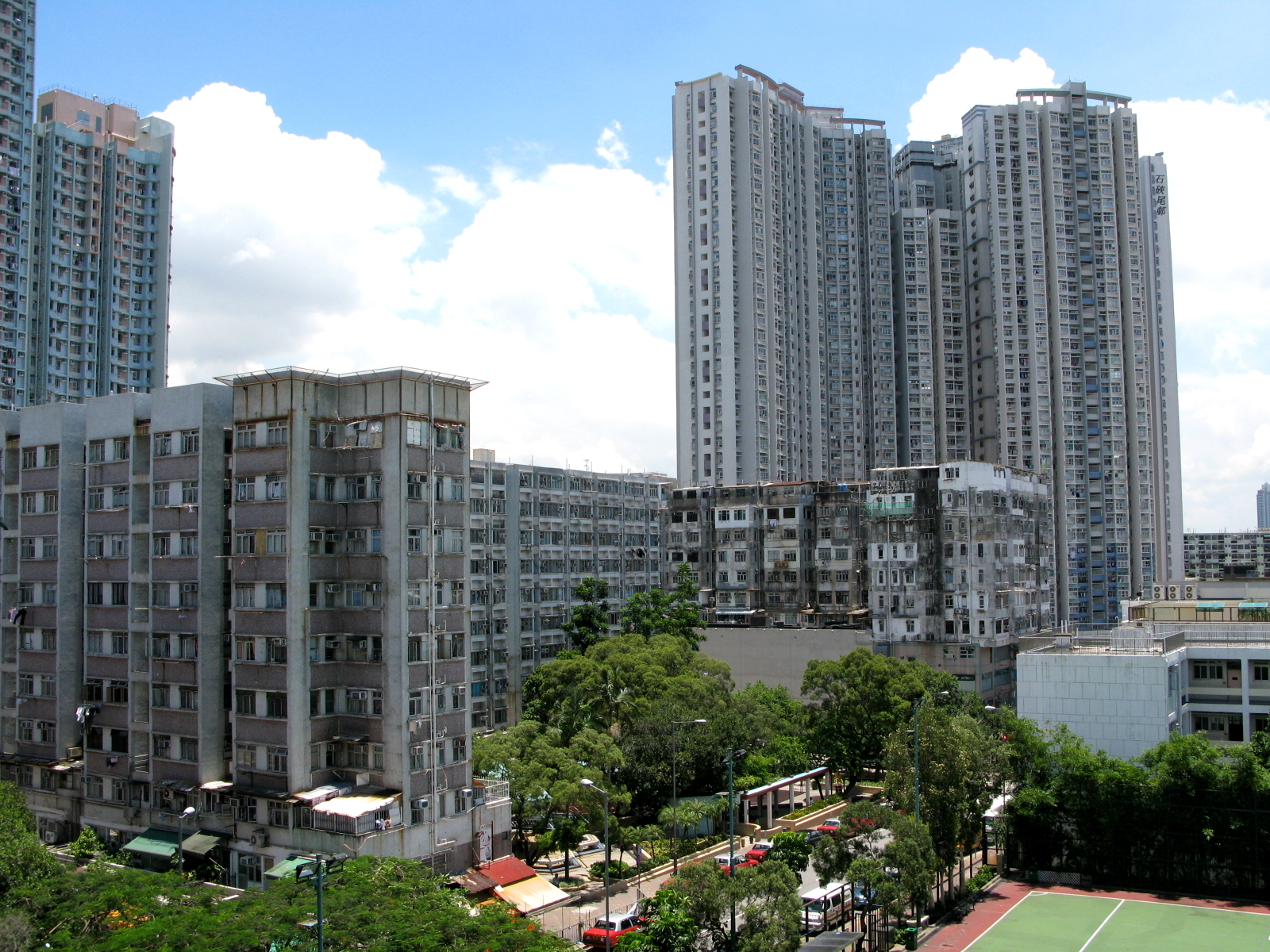
- Shek Kip Mei in 2009
- Traditional Chinese: 石硤尾
- Simplified Chinese: 石硖尾
- Literal meaning: Gorge End
Transcriptions
Standard Mandarin
- Hanyu Pinyin: Shíxiáwěi
- IPA: [ʂɻ̩̌ɕjǎwèɪ]
Yue: Cantonese
- Yale Romanization: Sehk gip méih
- Jyutping: Sek^{6} gip^{3} mei^{5}
- IPA: [sɛ̀ːkkɪ̄pme̬i]

Shek Kap Mei
- Traditional Chinese: 石甲尾
- Simplified Chinese: 石甲尾
Transcriptions
Yue: Cantonese
- Yale Romanization: Sehk gaap méih
- Jyutping: Sek^{6} gaap^{3} mei^{5}

Shek Kip Mei, originally known as Shek Kap Mei, is an area in New Kowloon, to the northeast of the Kowloon Peninsula of Hong Kong. It borders Sham Shui Po and Kowloon Tong.

== History ==
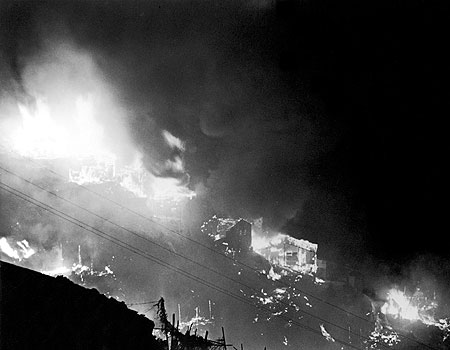
The 1953 Shek Kip Mei fire

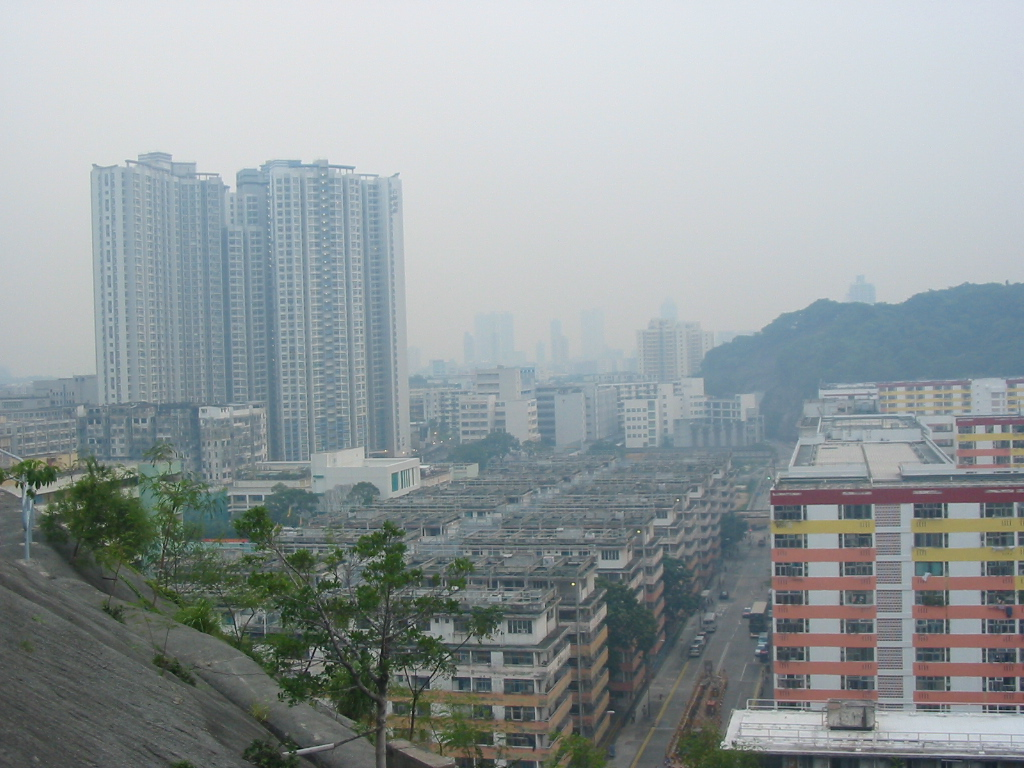
Shek Kip Mei Estate (foreground) in 2006. The area on the left has since been redeveloped to new Shek Kip Mei Estate in 2012

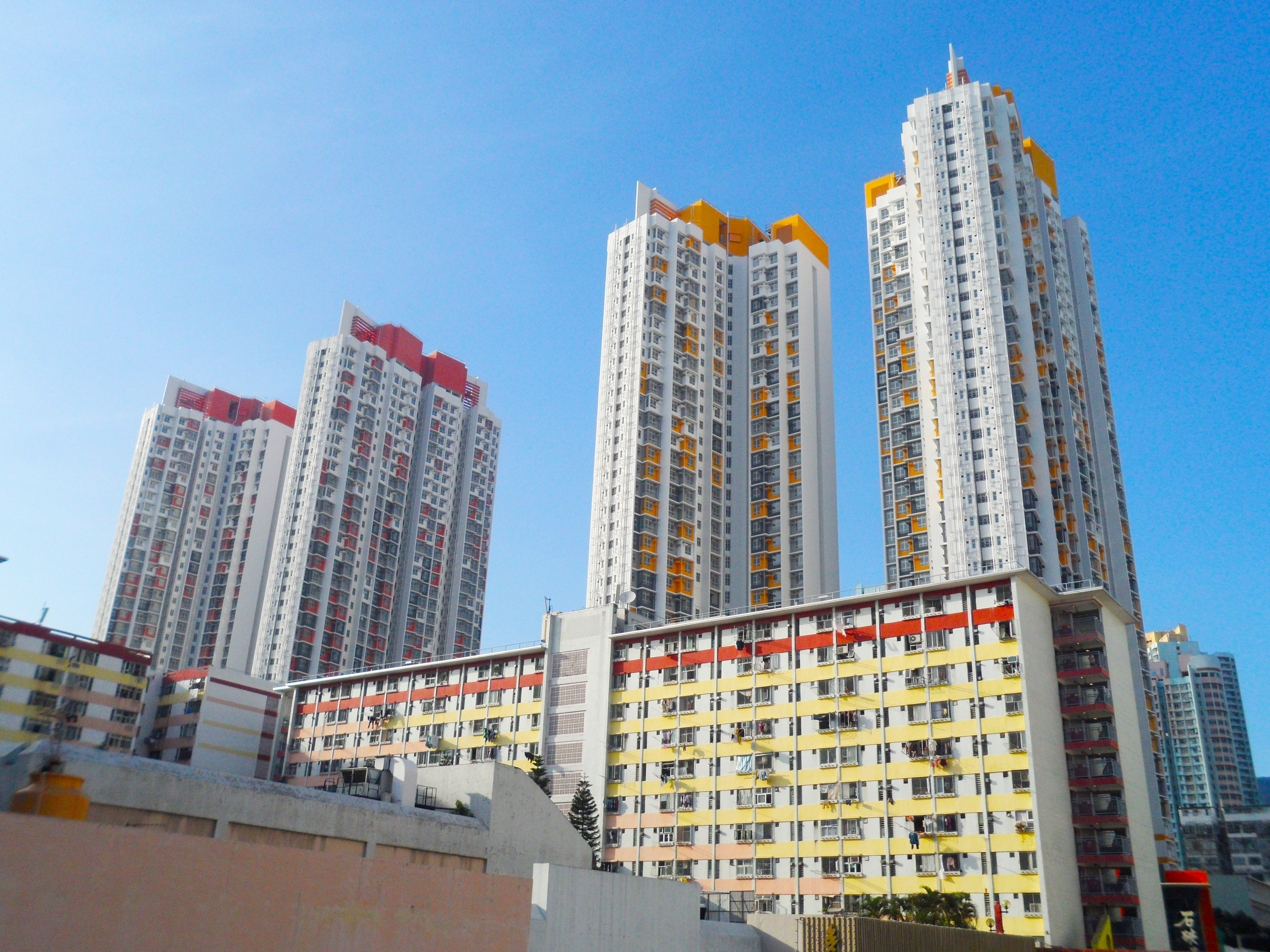
new Shek Kip Mei Estate in 2012

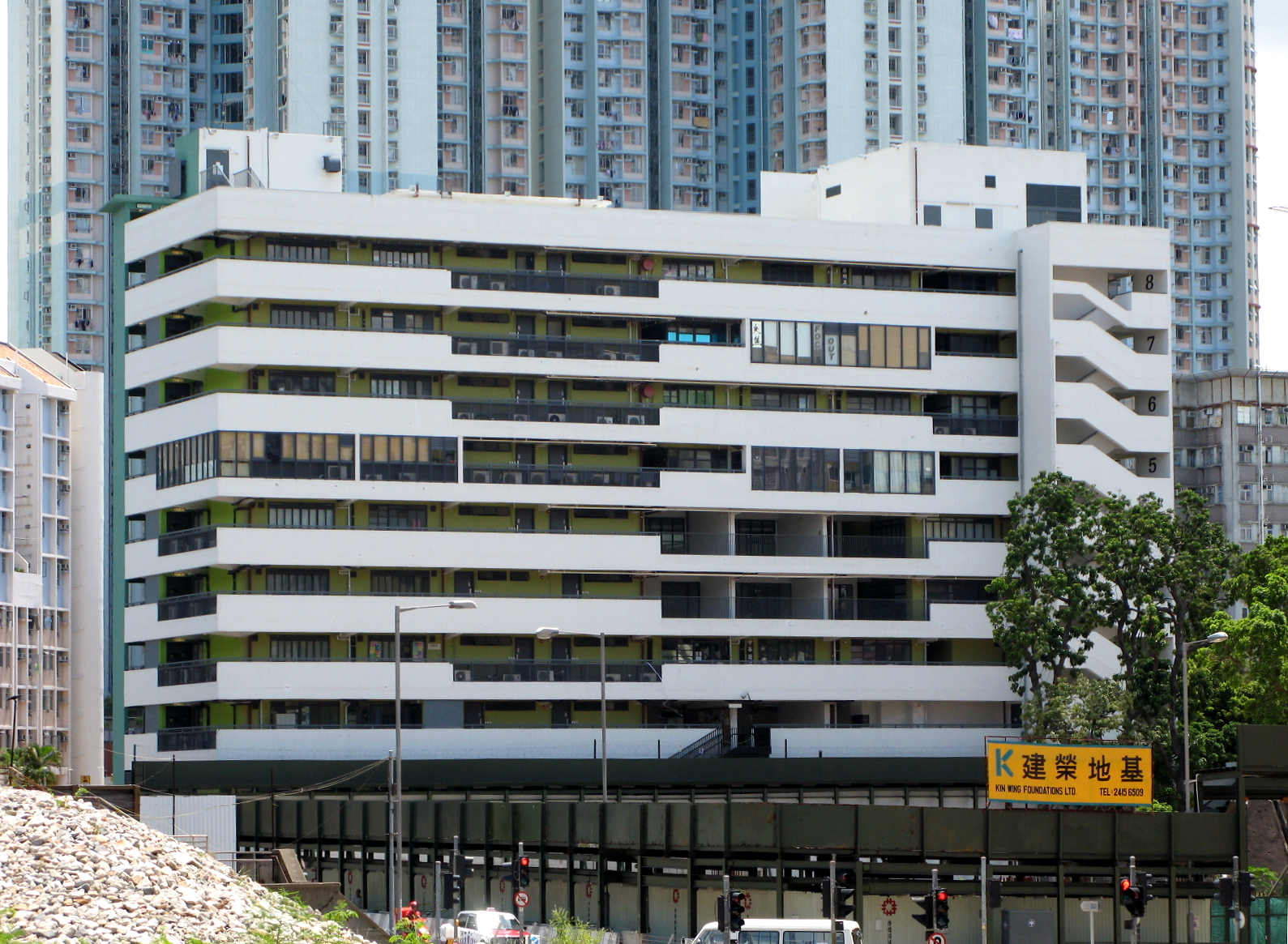
The Jockey Club Creative Arts Centre (JCCAC) is the main art studio and gallery inside Shek Kip Mei

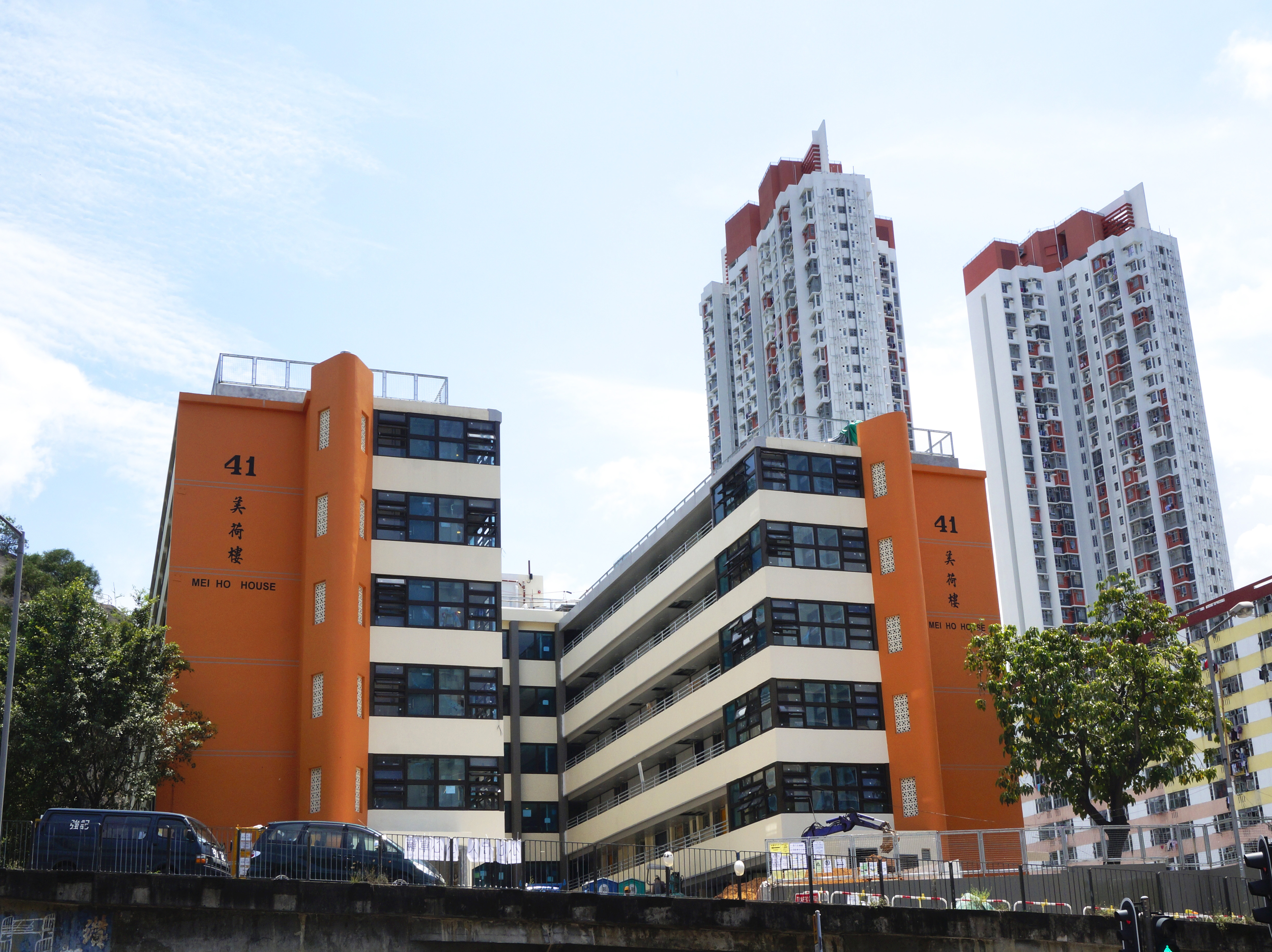
Revitalisation of Mei Ho House as City Hostel

At the time of the 1911 census, the population of Shek Kip Mei was 72.

A major fire on 25 December 1953 destroyed the Shek Kip Mei shanty town of immigrants from Mainland China who had fled to Hong Kong, leaving 53,000 people homeless.

After the fire, the governor Alexander Grantham launched a public housing programme to introduce the idea of multi-storey building for the immigrant population living there. The standardised new structures offered fire- and flood-resistant construction to previously vulnerable hut dwellers. The programme involved demolishing the rest of the makeshift houses left untouched by the fire, and the construction of the Shek Kip Mei Low-cost Housing Estate in their stead. The apartments were small, only about 300 square feet (28 m^{2}). Each unit could house five people, and each building had a capacity of 2,500 residents. The rent was HK$17 per square foot per month, while the rent for a commercial store downstairs was HK$100 per month. Foreign tourists visiting the apartment complexes referred to them as "prisons". Some scholars have argued that the government has been overstating the role of the fire in the history of public housing in Hong Kong.

At the north of Shek Kip Mei is Tai Wo Ping (大窩坪), along Beacon Hill. This was a cottage area (a type of resettlement accommodation) from the 1950s to 1970s, but it has been developed into a public housing estate, Chak On Estate (澤安邨), and two private housing estates, Beacon Heights (畢架山花園) and Dynasty Heights (帝景峰).

== Present ==
The Government has backed off from its plans to redevelop the area, following great opposition from many who believe they symbolised the history of Hong Kong. An alternative plan to renovate it for use as a hostel and museum has been completed. The museum includes restored rooms, resident stories and photos, and documentation of the history of public housing estates.

Shek Kip Mei now has several types of housing including the public apartments, Pak Tin Estate and private housing such as Beacon Heights and Dynasty Heights. Several malls and churches can also be found in the area now.

The old Shek Kip Mei Factory Estate was renovated and now serves as the Jockey Club Creative Arts Centre.

== Transportation ==
Since 1 October 1979, it has been served by Shek Kip Mei station on the MTR at Woh Chai Street and Wai Chi Street.

Route 7 passes to the north of the area and accessed via Nam Cheong Street.

KMB and Citybus (formerly New World First Bus) operates a number or routes that travel within the area.

== Education ==
Shek Kip Mei is in Primary One Admission (POA) School Net 40. Within the school net are multiple aided schools (operated independently but funded with government money) and two government schools: Fuk Wing Street Government Primary School and Li Cheng Uk Government Primary School.

Hong Kong Public Libraries maintains the Shek Kip Mei Public Library in the Shek Kip Mei Estate.

== See also ==
- Public housing in Hong Kong
- Shek Kip Mei Estate and Mei Ho House
- North Kowloon Magistracy
- Woh Chai Shan aka. Shek Kip Mei Hill aka. Bishop Hill, a hill in Shek Kip Mei
