= Parc Oasis =

Housing estate in Kowloon, Hong Kong

Coordinates: 22.3339°N 114.1740°E

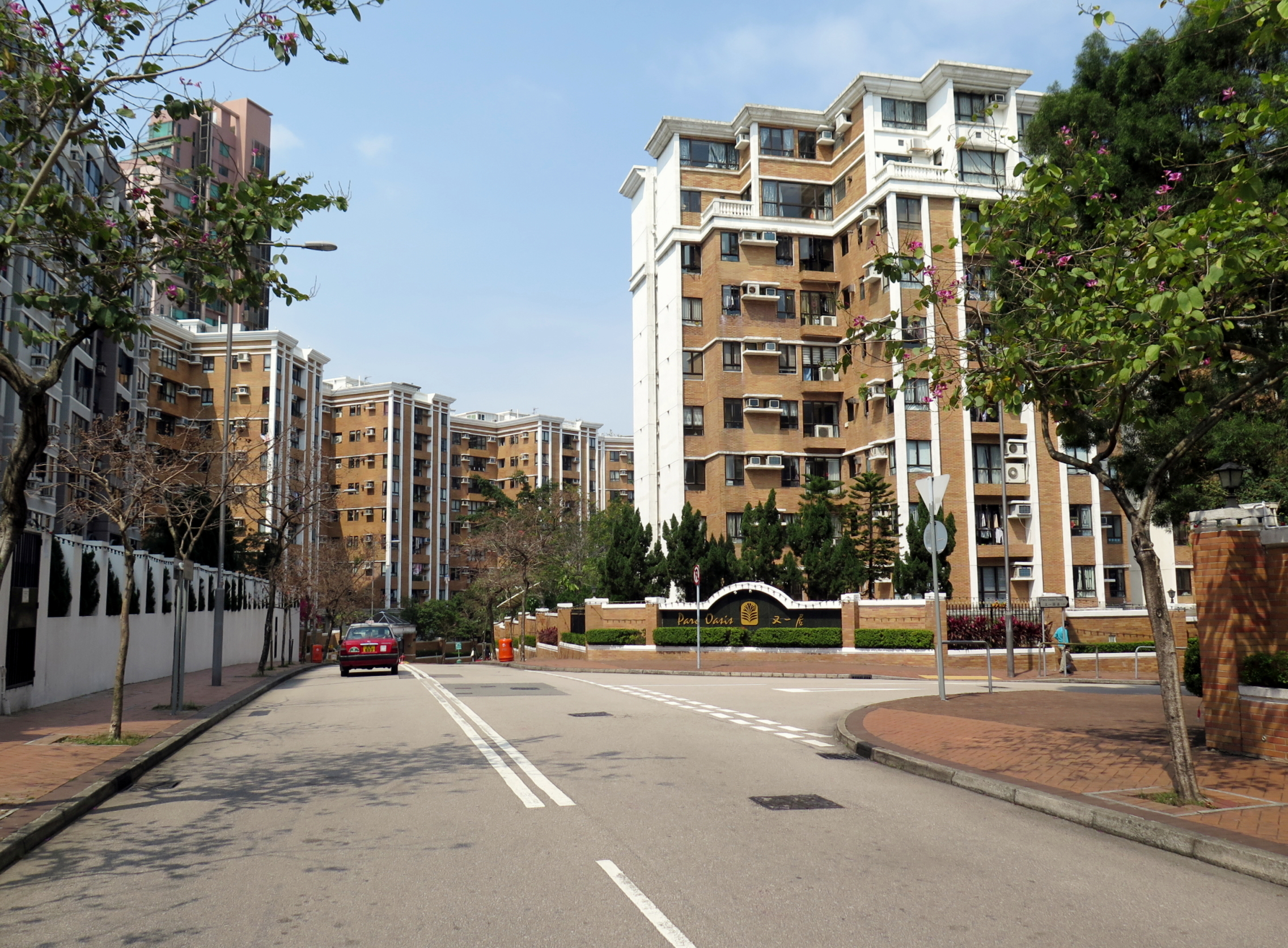
Parc Oasis, near the junction of Parc Oasis Road and Grandeur Road

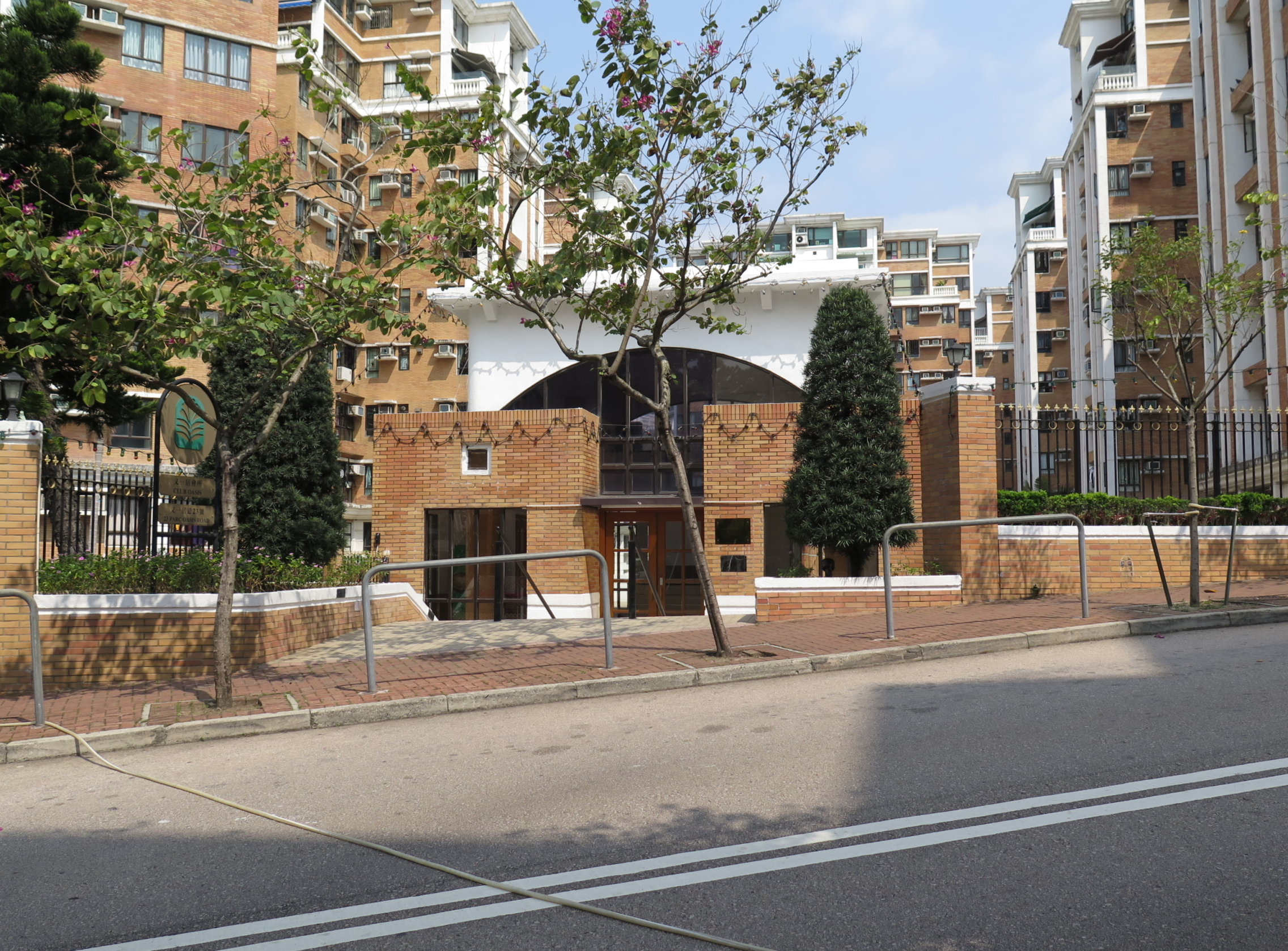
Entrance of Parc Oasis Club House

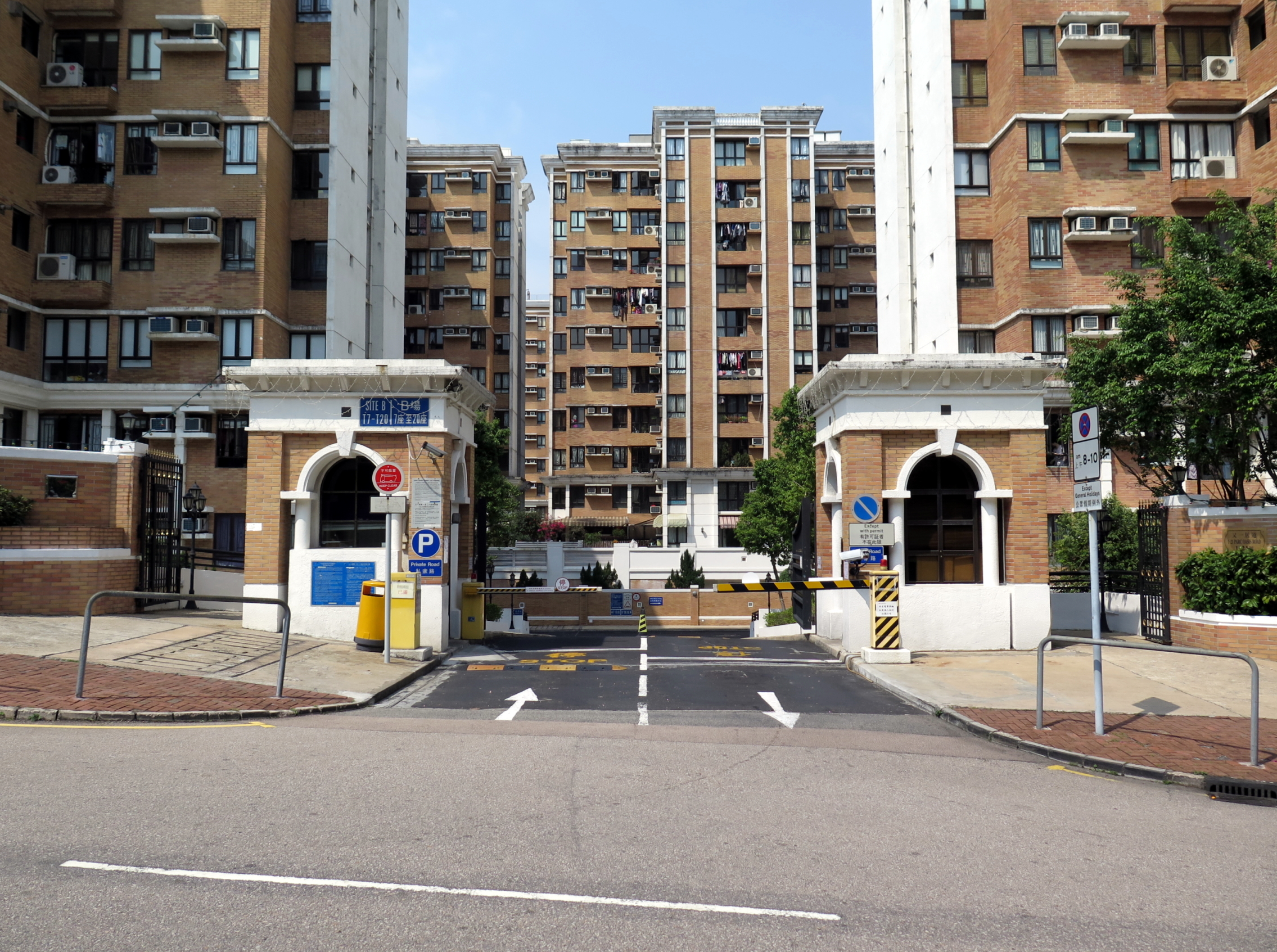
Entrance of Parc Oasis car park

Parc Oasis (Chinese: 又一居) is a private housing estate in Yau Yat Chuen, Kowloon, Hong Kong, located near MTR Kowloon Tong station. It is one of the largest development in Yau Yat Chuen. After the completion of the Festival Walk in 1998, shopping, watching movies and dining were more convenient. Nearby area in Kowloon Tong is a place of many famous kindergartens, primary and secondary schools.

== Overview ==
The estate consists of 33 residential blocks in three phases with a total of 1,822 units. Phase 1 consists of Tower 1 to Tower 20, Phase 2 consists of Tower 21, 22, 23 and 25 and Phase 3 consists of Tower 26 to Tower 33. It was jointly developed by Wheelock & Co. and Sino Land.

== History ==
In December 1989, Realty Development Corporation (RDC), a later subsidiary of Wheelock & Co, purchased the Parc Oasis development site for HK$1.06 billion at a government land auction.

== Resident facilities ==
- Indoor Gym
- Outdoor swimming pool
- Tennis courts
- Sauna
- Children playrooms

== Transportation ==
Parc Oasis residents typically walk or ride a minibus to the Kowloon Tong station. After the completion of Sha Tin to Central Link segment, it would take only around ten minutes to travel from the Kowloon Tong station directly to the Exhibition Centre and Admiralty station, it would be convenient for residents working in Wan Chai, Admiralty and Central district in Hong Kong Island. On the other hand, traveling to Mong Kok shopping area is only about ten minutes drive away.

== Nearby ==
- Festival Walk
- City University of Hong Kong
- Yau Yat Chuen
