= Cucchiara =

Cucchiara is an Italian surname which is most prevalent in the region of Sicily and is also to be found among the American, Argentinian, German and French Italian diaspora. Notable people with the surname include:

- Frank Cucchiara (1895–1976), Italian-American mafioso
- Joseph Cucchiara (1889–1966), Italian missionary
- Rita Cucchiara (born 1965), Italian electrical and computer engineer
- Tony Cucchiara (1937–2018), Italian folk singer-songwriter, playwright and composer
