= Tak Nga Secondary School =

Secondary school in Hong Kong

Coordinates: 22.3305°N 114.1752°E

Tak Nga Secondary School (Chinese: 德雅中學) is a Hong Kong aided secondary school founded in 1962, a subsidised Girls' Catholic School sponsored by Sisters Announcers of the Lord.

The school is located in 18 Tat Chee Avenue, Yau Yat Chuen, Sham Shui Po of the Kowloon District of Hong Kong.

The school was founded by Rev. Joseph Cucchiara.

== Motto ==
- Wisdom (智): to pursue knowledge
- Courage (勇): to accept challenges and responsibilities
- Diligence (勤): to be a lifelong learner
- Perseverance (奮): to achieve targets

== Founder ==
Joseph Cucchiara (郭怡雅)
Sisters Announcers of the Lord (顯主女修會).

Joseph Cucchiara (郭怡雅) was born on the island of Sicily in Italy in 1889. He joined the Salesians of Don Bosco in 1907. After the outbreak of World War I, he followed the armies and served in hospitals.

He was delegated to the diocese of Shiu Chow of Kwangtung (Guangdong) in 1911. He founded many churches and schools in the area. After communists came to the area, most of these structures fell under the control of the communists. He was then sent to work at the Aberdeen Technical School in Hong Kong. In the meantime, he helped the sisters of Sisters Announcers of the Lord from Shiu Chow to Hong Kong. He dedicated much effort to help the sisters open Tak Nga Primary School and Tak Nga Secondary School. He died in Canossa Hospital on 18 December 1966 and was buried in Happy Valley, Hong Kong.

The sisters from Sisters Announcers of the Lord founded a school on Tsing Yi Island and named it Father Cucchiara Memorial School to remember his contribution.

== School History ==
In 1954, the Sisters of the Announcers of the Lord, following the fervent and enthusiastic preaching of St Theresa, formally began their missionary activities in Cheung Sha Wan. Under the leadership of the late Salesian Priest Reverend Father Joseph Cucchiara, the services provided by the Sisters were broadened. On 25 July 1956, which was the feast day of St. Jacob, the Sisters were granted permission by the late Bishop of Hong Kong, His Excellency Bishop Bianchi, to establish a school in Hong Kong.

The word ‘Tak’ was derived from the Chinese name of St. Theresa to denote the Sisters’ desire to teach youngsters to follow the good example of St. Theresa, so that they would become good children of the Lord and fine citizens of society. The word ‘Nga’ was taken from the Chinese name of St. Jacob because the Sisters wanted to commemorate the spirit of St. Jacob. These were the origins of the name of our school ‘Tak Nga’.

The founder of our school, the late Reverend Father Joseph Cucchiara, was determined to surmount all difficulties in establishing the school. On 15 November 1958, a parcel of Crown land of 13755 square feet on Tat Chee Avenue in Yau Yat Chuen was granted by the Hong Kong Government to build Tak Nga Primary School. The construction of Tak Nga was started on 25 February 1960. In order to commemorate the 30th anniversary of the martyrdom of Bishop Versiglia, Founder of the Congregation of Sisters ‘Announcers of the Lord’, the school was named ‘Bishop Versiglia Tak Nga School’.

The construction of the school building was almost finished in September 1960 when three classrooms were generously offered by the parish priest of St. Teresa’s Parish for the school’s temporary use. Tak Nga was moved to the new school building on 20 February 1961 when the construction was completed. Mr. Corkburn, Assistant Director of Education, and Mrs. Corkburn were the guests of honour in our opening ceremony in September 1961, which signified the beginning of Tak Nga’s contribution to the education in Hong Kong.

In its early years, Tak Nga only ran a primary section. Thanks to the insight of Father Joseph Cucchiara, who showed concern about the further education of Tak Nga’s pupils, the building of the secondary section of Tak Nga was then planned. Permission was granted by the Director of Education to build a secondary section on 1 May 1962. Lessons in the secondary section started in the same year. On 9 March 1963, the government granted a site of 19410 square feet adjacent to the primary section for the building of our secondary section, which was completed in 1964 and was blessed by His Excellency II Nuncio monseigneur Caprio on 3 November in the same year. On 11 January 1965, all students started to have their lessons in the new building of the secondary section, and Bishop Bianchi officially blessed the school during a Thanksgiving mass on 3 July 1965.

Tak Nga Secondary School first ran both a Chinese middle school and an English Secondary Section to suit the students’ needs. Later in 1976, the English Secondary Section increased her capacity while the Chinese middle school places were reduced due to the changing needs of society and the desires of parents. In the autumn of 1980, Tak Nga became entirely an English Secondary School.

== Class structure ==
The school has four classes from S1 (Secondary One) to S3 (Secondary Three), each form consisting of 160 students; four classes in S4 to S5, each form consisting of 160 students having 1 Science classes, 1 Arts and 2 Arts and Commerce classes; two classes in Form 6 and 7, each form 1 science class consisting of 28 students and 1 Arts class consisting of 32 students.

== Curriculum ==
The school uses English as the medium of instruction. The policy is implemented through tri-lingual assemblies, English and Chinese extensive reading schemes, activities in English Corner, Society of Eloquence, English Week and Putonghua Club.

Curriculum reform and planning are carried out by the Academic Committee. Some subject panels participate in pilot schemes run by the Curriculum Development Institute of EDB.

Selected subjects under planning for the New Senior Secondary (NSS) curriculum in the 2009/10 s.y.: Economics, Geography, Chinese History, History, Ethics & Religious Studies, Biology, Chemistry, Physics, Combined Science, Business, Accounting and Financial Studies, Information and Communication Technology, Visual Arts.

== Facilities ==
There are 26 classrooms, 16 special rooms, an assembly hall, a basketball court, a multi-media learning centre, language room, dancing room and a library. All rooms are air-conditioned and equipped with multi-media teaching facilities. To help students learn through the Internet, the school has installed 1G Fiber Optics network and 54M wireless LAN network. Students can use any computer to access Internet through our 30M broadband. There are computers and projectors in every classroom and a special room to assist teachers in using IT in their teaching.

== Club and Societies ==
- Community Youth Club
- Art Club
- Badminton Club
- Basketball Club
- Cookery Club
- Dance Club
- Drama Club
- Girl Guides
- Hong Kong Air Cadet Corps
- Library Society
- Pop Dance Club
- Red Cross
- Latin Dance Club
- Society of Eloquence
- Table-Tennis Club
- Volleyball Club
- Catholic Society

== School Administration Team ==
Supervisor:

- Sr Chan Wai Fan Mabel

Principal:

- Ms Cheung Ka Wai Winnie

Vice-principals:

- Ms Lo Yin Tao (in charge of learning and teaching)
- Mrs Wong Wu Kwan Fong (in charge of student formation)

Assistant Principal:

- Ms Chang Ka Man

== School Song ==
<poem> O dear Shepherd E'er so loving, so kind so pious Bishop Versiglia. On the fold on the flock of Tak Nga obtain Jesus' and Mary's blessing. (x 2)

(Chorus:) Tak Nga School, O happy family, in flamed by our Martyr's deeds. To God, our Father, give honour, glory and thanks for gifts so blessed as these.

To be Christians, Strong & gay, and to our Baptism always true. That's our aim for ev'ry day. O God, our Father, help us too.

(Repeat chorus once)
