= Kowloon Tong station =

MTR interchange station in Kowloon, Hong Kong

Kowloon Tong 九龍塘
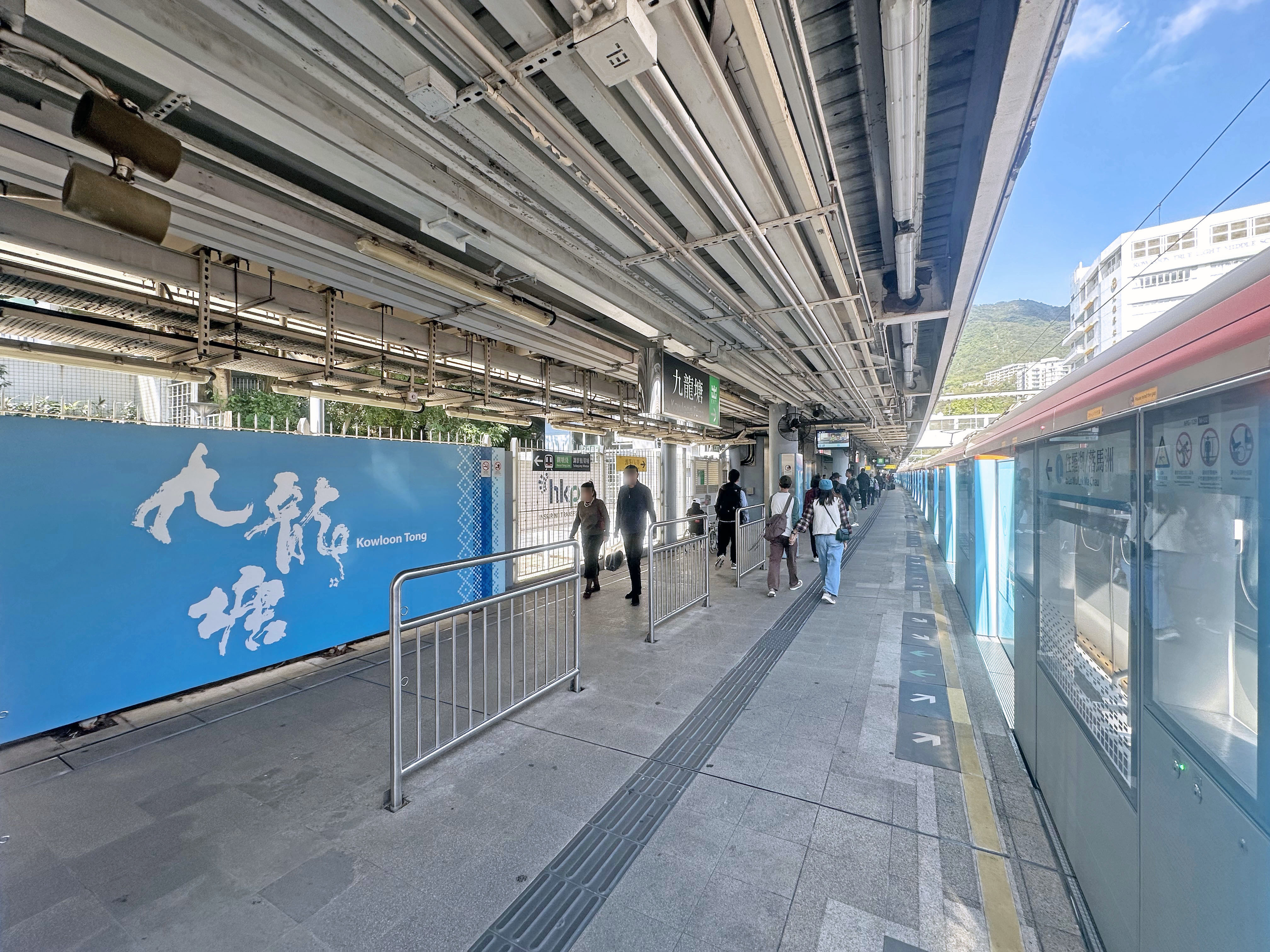
- Kowloon Tong Station East Rail Line Platform (December 2024)

Chinese name
- Traditional Chinese: 九龍塘
- Simplified Chinese: 九龙塘
- Jyutping: Gau2lung4tong4
- Hanyu Pinyin: Jiǔlóngtáng
- Literal meaning: Nine Dragons Pond
Transcriptions
Standard Mandarin
- Hanyu Pinyin: Jiǔlóngtáng
Yue: Cantonese
- Yale Romanization: Gáulùngtòng
- IPA: [kɐw˧˥lʊŋ˩tʰɔŋ˩]
- Jyutping: Gau2lung4tong4

General information
- Location: Suffolk Road / To Fuk Road, Kowloon Tong; Kowloon City District, Hong Kong
- Coordinates: 22°20′13″N 114°10′34″E
- System: MTR rapid transit station
- Owner: Kwun Tong line: MTR Corporation; East Rail line: KCR Corporation
- Operator: MTR Corporation
- Lines: Kwun Tong line; East Rail line
- Platforms: 4 (1 island platform on Kwun Tong line and 2 side platforms on East Rail line)
- Tracks: 4
- Connections: Bus, minibus

Construction
- Structure type: Kwun Tong line: Underground; East Rail line: At-grade
- Platform levels: 2
- Accessible: Yes

Other information
- Station code: KOT

History
- Opened: Kwun Tong line: 1 October 1979; 47 years ago; East Rail line: 4 May 1982; 44 years ago
- Electrified: East Rail line

Services
| Preceding station | MTR | Following station |
|---|---|---|
| Shek Kip Mei towards Whampoa | Kwun Tong line | Lok Fu towards Tiu Keng Leng |
| Mong Kok East towards Admiralty | East Rail line | Tai Wai towards Lo Wu or Lok Ma Chau |
| Mong Kok East Terminus | East Rail line Some rush hour trips | Tai Wai towards Lo Wu or Lok Ma Chau |
Proposed (2039)
| Northeast Kwai Chung towards Kam Sheung Road | Central Rail Link | Terminus |
Track layout
Location
- Location within MTR

Kowloon Tong is a station on MTR's Kwun Tong line and East Rail line in New Kowloon, Hong Kong. Its livery is sky blue. The station serves Kowloon Tong and its vicinity, including Yau Yat Tsuen, the Festival Walk shopping centre, City University of Hong Kong and Hong Kong Baptist University.

The station straddles the boundary between Kowloon City District and Sham Shui Po District.

This station serves as one of four interchange stations for the East Rail line, leading up to the New Territories and entry point to mainland China. Therefore, it is one of the busiest stations in the system.

== History ==
On 1 October 1910, the KCR British Section opened, including Beacon Hill Tunnel, but without any station at Kowloon Tong. Kowloon Tong station on the KCR opened on 4 May 1982, serving as an interchange point with the MTR.

On 1 October 1979, the first phase of the MTR's Kwun Tong line opened to the public, including Kowloon Tong station. Kumagai Gumi is the main contractor under Contract 205.

A new underground southern concourse for the East Rail line was opened on 15 April 2004 to increase the station's capacity. The project included a new 60-metre (196 ft 10 in) subway linking to the MTR concourse (meaning the station now has two subways for transferring passengers). The new 1,800-square-metre (19,375 sq ft) concourse also included a new entrance (entrance D) on To Fuk Road. A passenger lift was also installed at entrance E at this time.

On 2 December 2007, the MTR–KCR merger took place, and Kowloon Tong became solely operated by MTR, but the turnstiles separating the respective concourse of the Kwun Tong line and East Rail line were not removed until 28 September 2008.

== Station layout ==
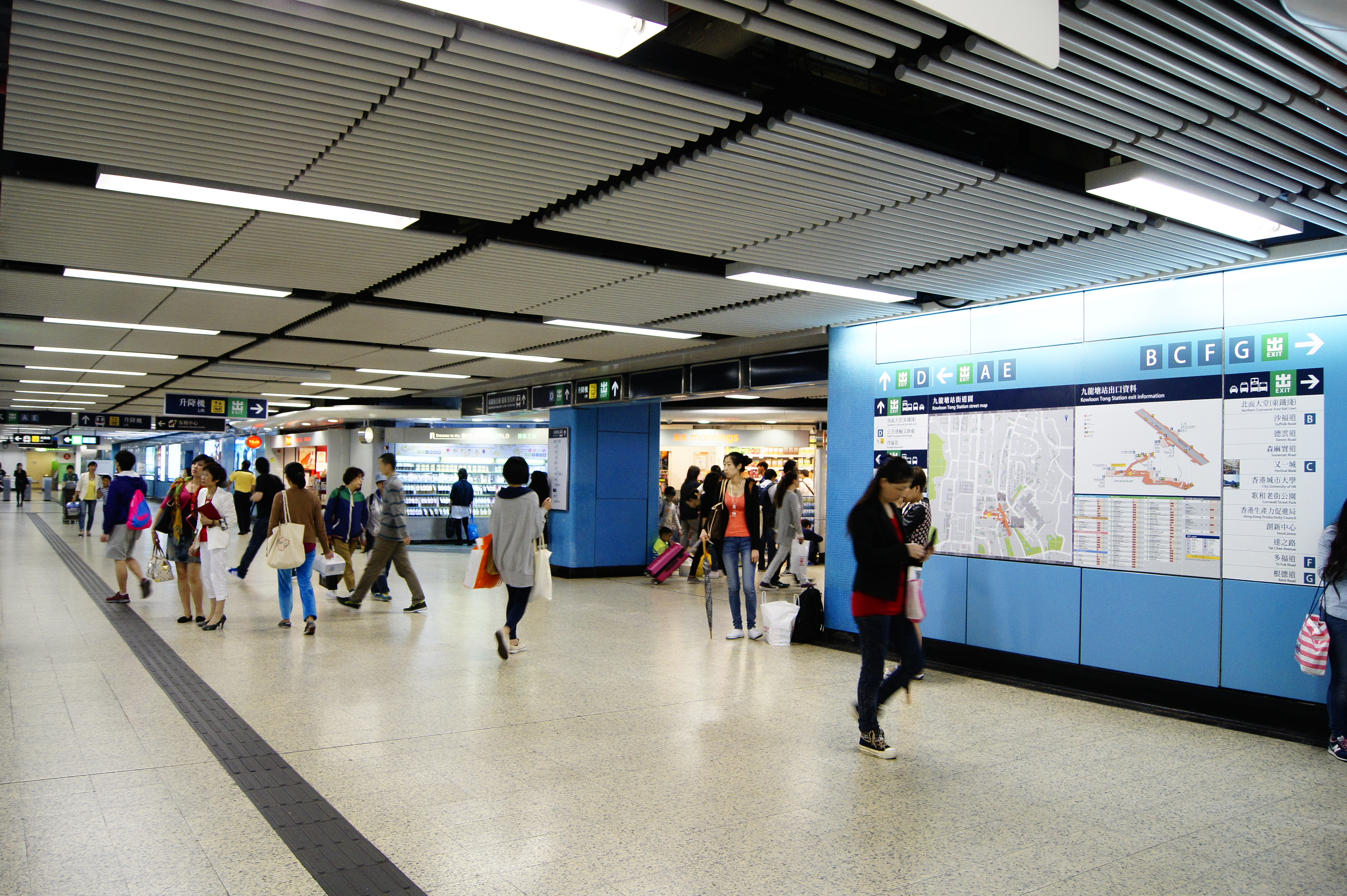
Kwun Tong line concourse in March 2014

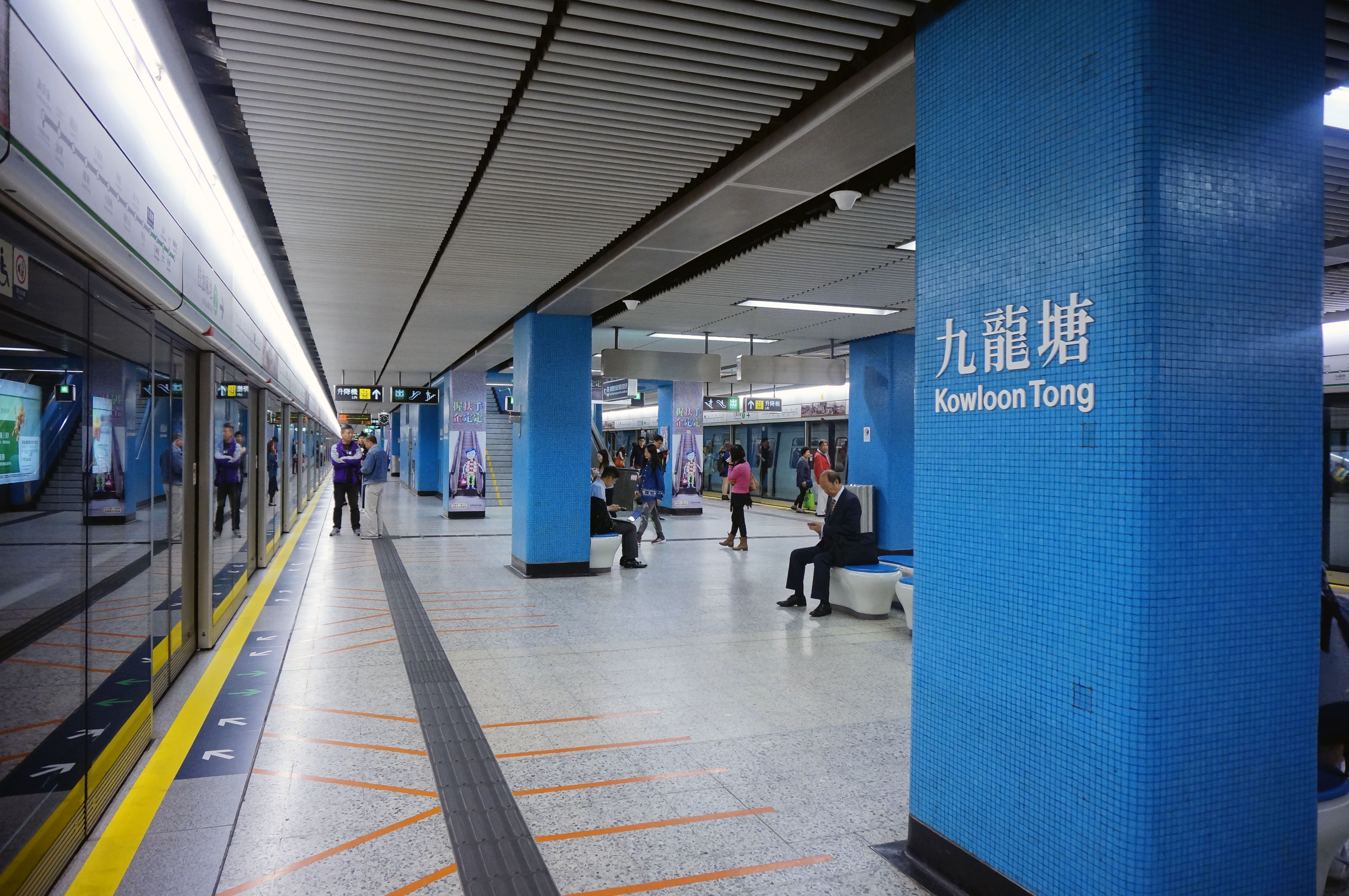
Kwun Tong line platforms in April 2014

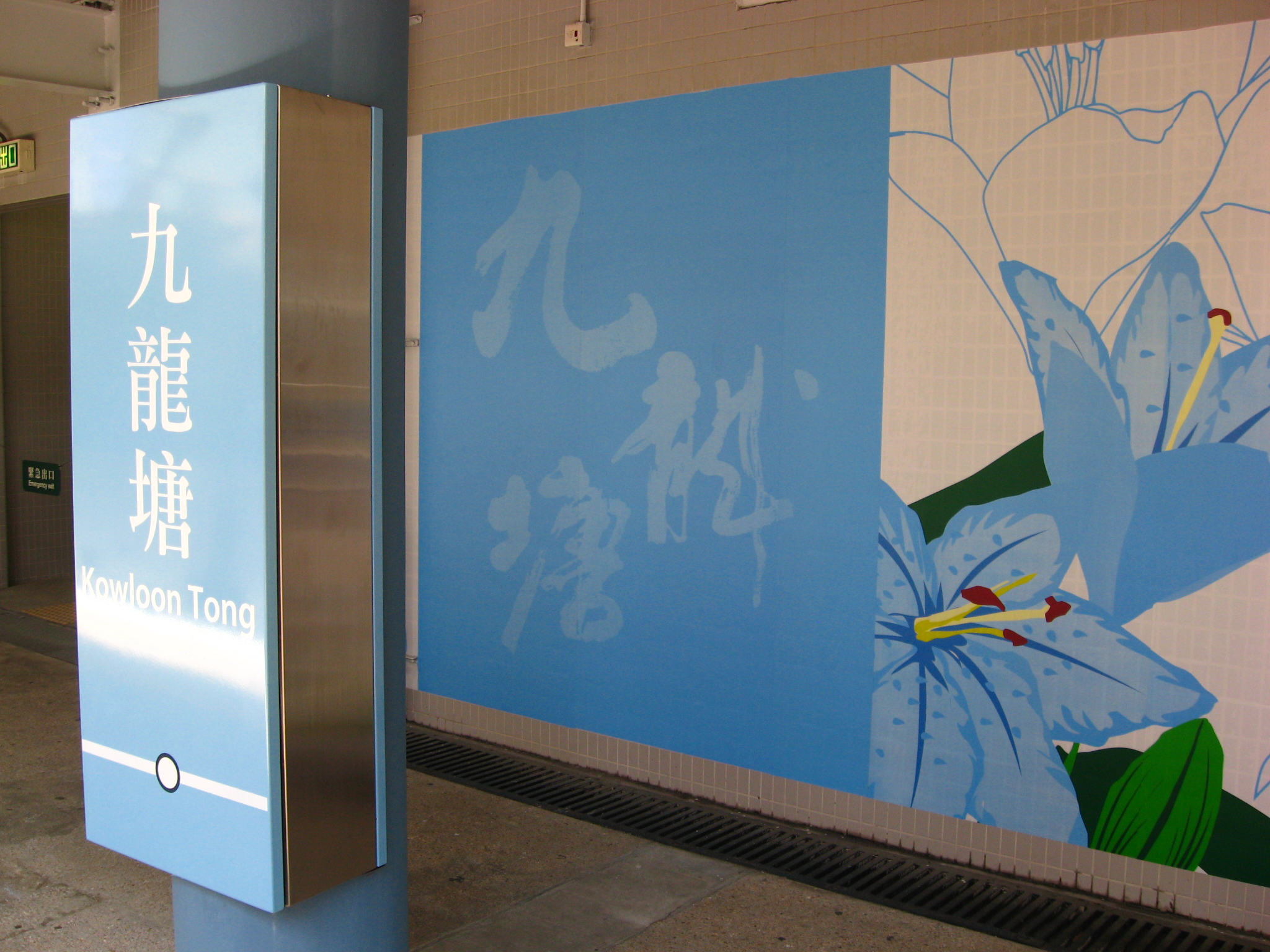
Decorations in East Rail line platforms in October 2008

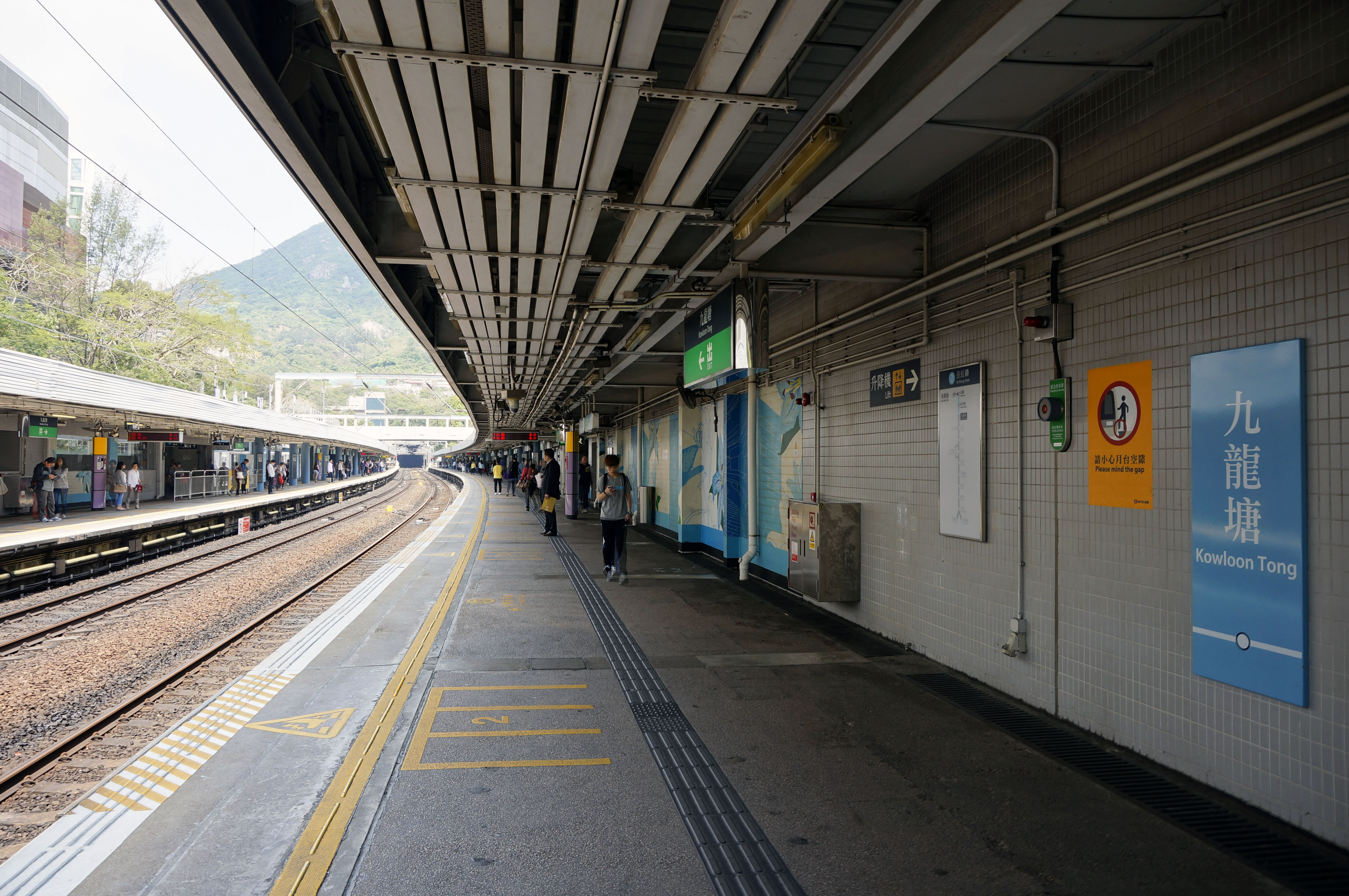
East Rail line platforms in April 2014

There is a reserved space for a track connecting the East Rail line and the Kwun Tong line in the westbound tunnel just outside Kowloon Tong station towards Shek Kip Mei. The space was originally designed to allow the Metro Cammell EMUs to be transferred to the Kwun Tong line when they were unloaded at Hung Hom, but the track was never built as the MTR decided to use lorries to carry all of its train carriages to the Kowloon Bay Depot.

Note that the platforms for both the East Rail line and the Kwun Tong line are called platforms 1 and 2.

| U1 | overlying buildings | Education Bureau Kowloon Education Service Centre |
| footbridge | East Rail line platforms | footbridge connecting East Rail line platforms, Festival Walk, Suffolk Road |
| GUpper Platform | Exit H | exit, customer service centre, shops |
| GUpper Platform | side platform, doors will open on the left |
| GUpper Platform | Platform 1 | East Rail line towards Lo Wu or Lok Ma Chau (Tai Wai) → |
| GUpper Platform | Platform 2 | ← East Rail line towards Admiralty (Mong Kok East) |
| GUpper Platform | side platform, doors will open on the left |
| GUpper Platform | Exit G | exit, transport interchange, taxi stand, customer service centre, shops |
| GUpper Platform | Kwun Tong line concourse | exits, transport interchange |
| C/L1/B | East Rail line northern concourse | customer service centre, shops, toilets, vending machines, automatic teller machines |
| C/L1/B | Kwun Tong line concourse | customer service centre, vending machines, automatic teller machines, shops, Octopus promotion machine, iCentre free internet service |
| C/L1/B | East Rail line southern concourse | customer service centre, toilets, shops, automatic teller machines |
| L2Lower Platform | Platform 1 | Kwun Tong line towards Tiu Keng Leng (Lok Fu) → |
| L2Lower Platform | island platform, doors will open on the right |
| L2Lower Platform | Platform 2 | ← Kwun Tong line towards Whampoa (Shek Kip Mei) |

== Entrances and exits ==
A pedestrian walkway connects the station with Festival Walk, a major shopping centre.

Kwun Tong line concourse

- A1: Suffolk Road
- A2: Hong Kong Baptist Hospital/Hong Kong Baptist University
- B: Suffolk Road
- C1: Hong Kong Productivity Council
- C2: Festival Walk/City University of Hong Kong
- E: EDB Education Services Centre

East Rail line southern concourse

- D: Public Transport Interchange

East Rail line northern concourse

- F: Kent Road

East Rail line platform 2 (ground level)

- G1: To Fuk Road
- G2: Festival Walk

East Rail line platform 1 (ground level)

- H: Hong Kong Productivity Council

Exit H is also accessible from the East Rail line northern concourse. It is possible to walk between Exit A and E in the vicinity of the station without entering the paid area. The same goes for Exit B, C, F and H.

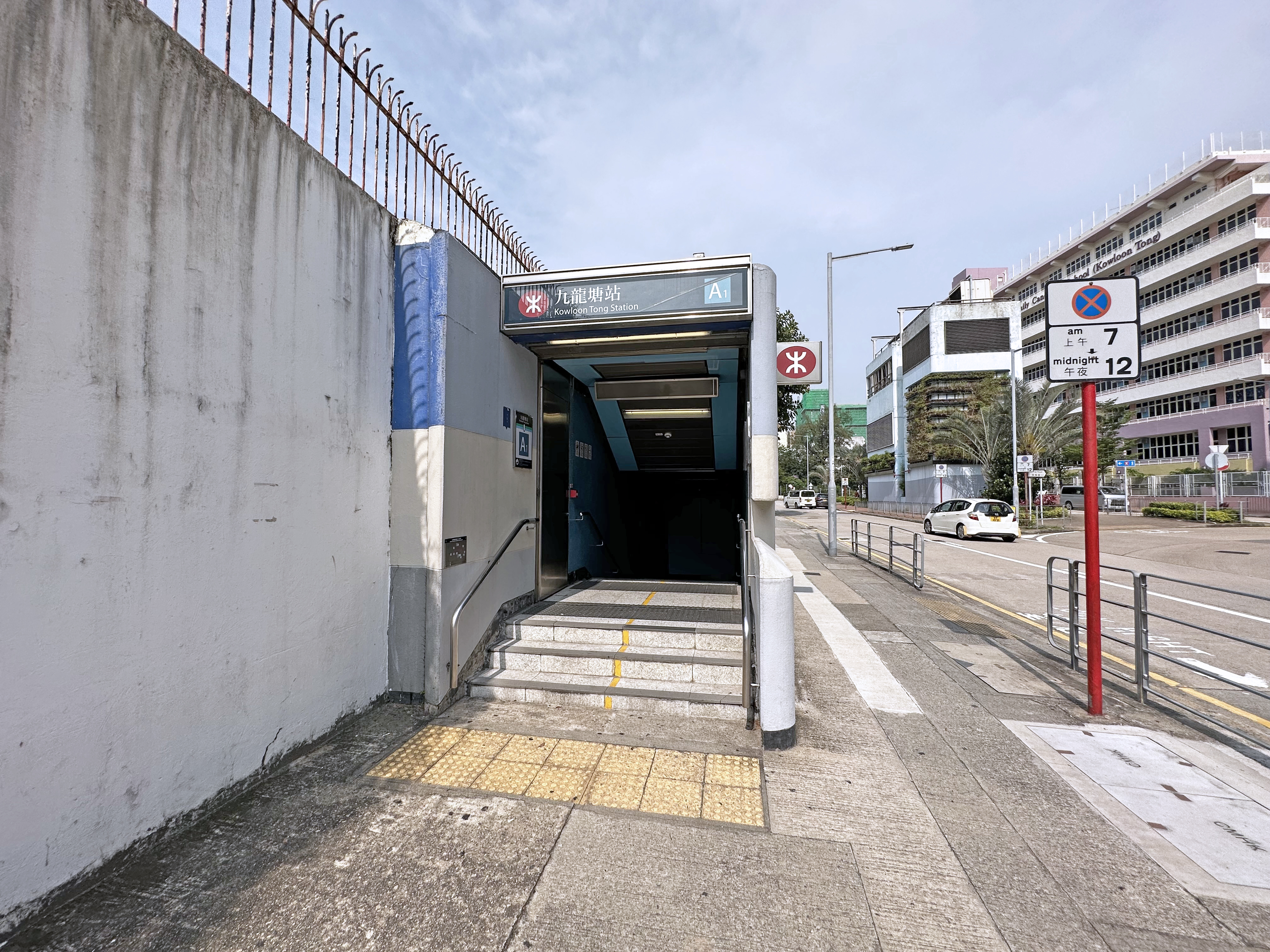
Exit A1

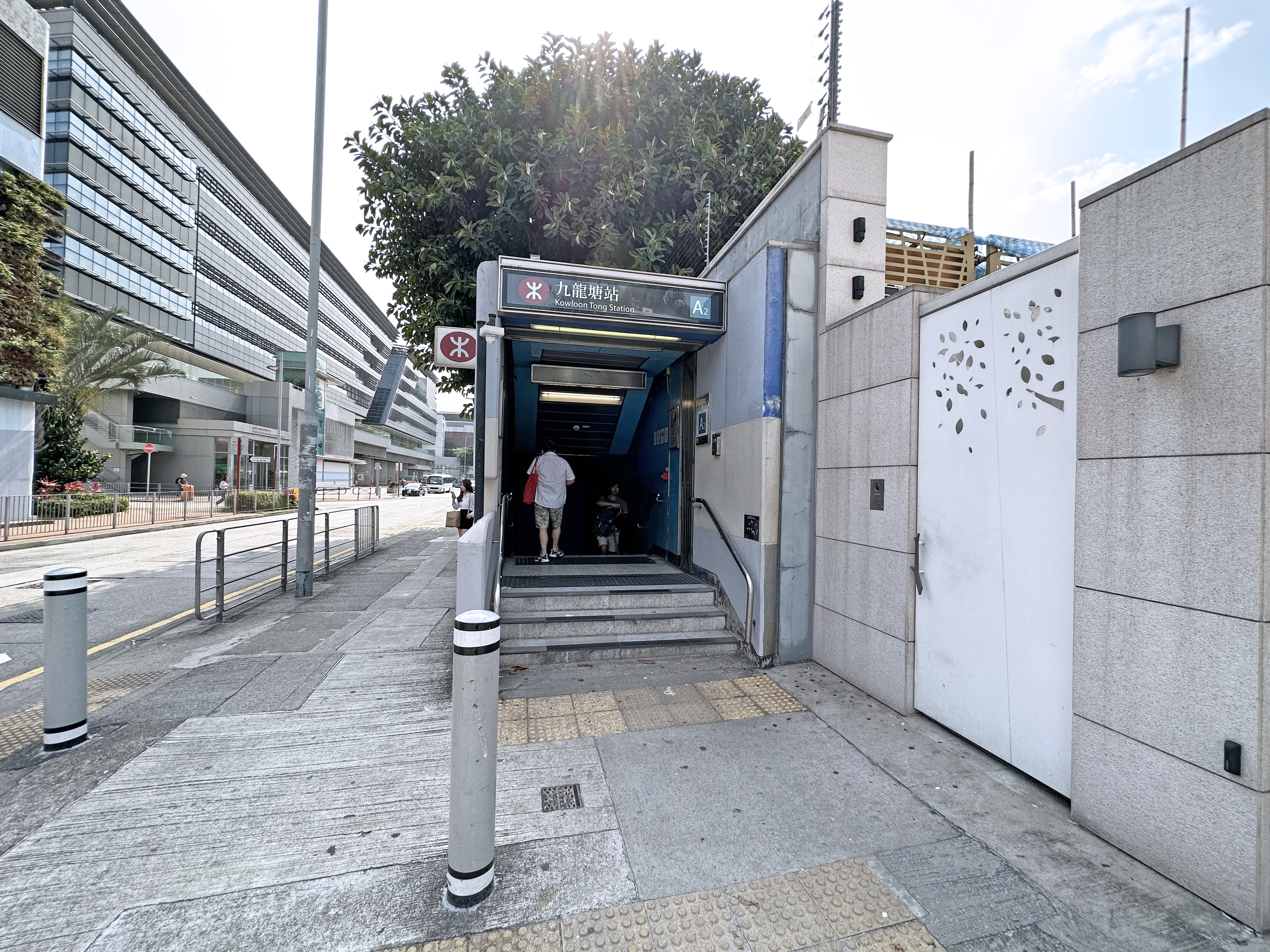
Exit A2

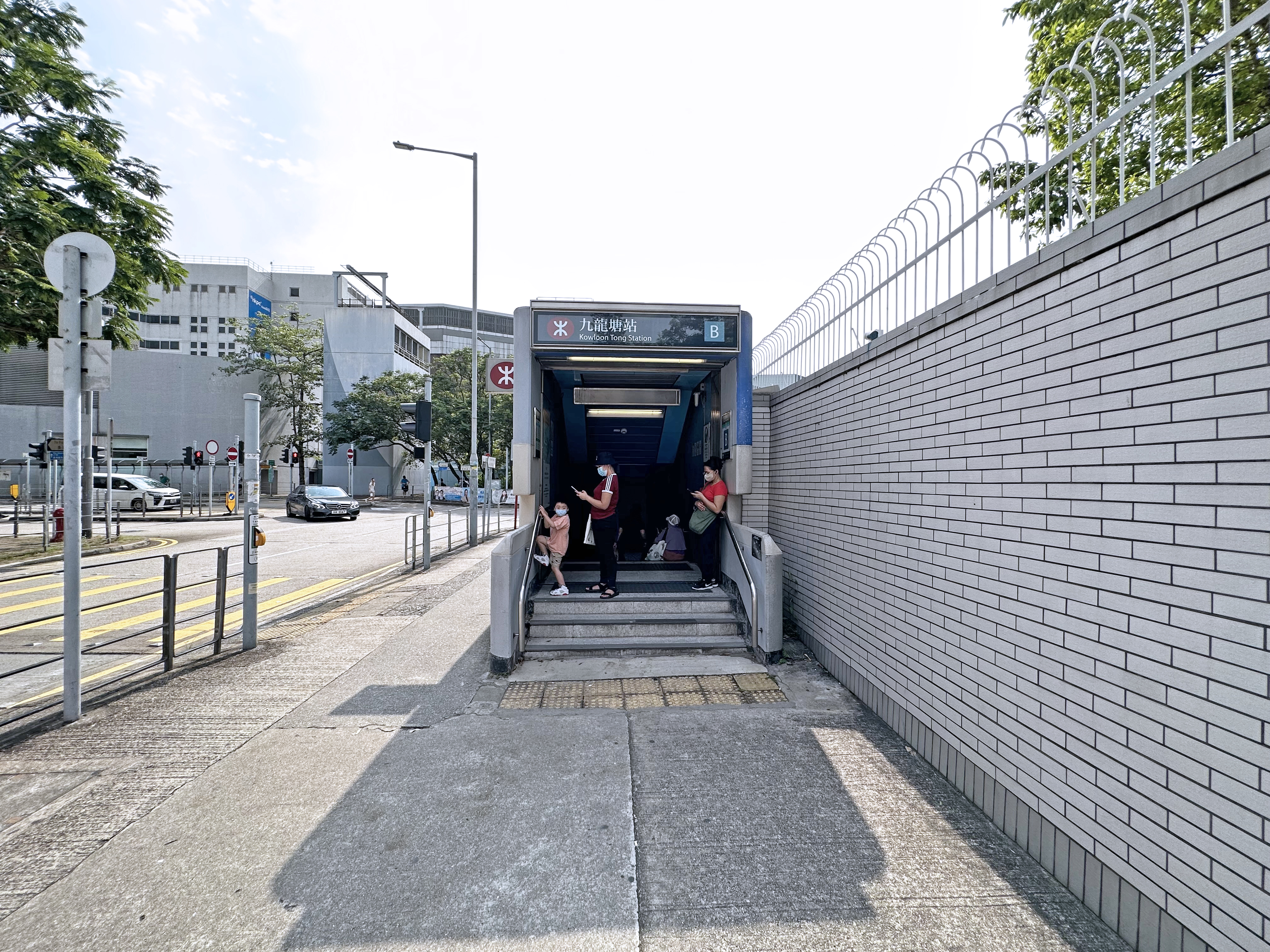
Exit B

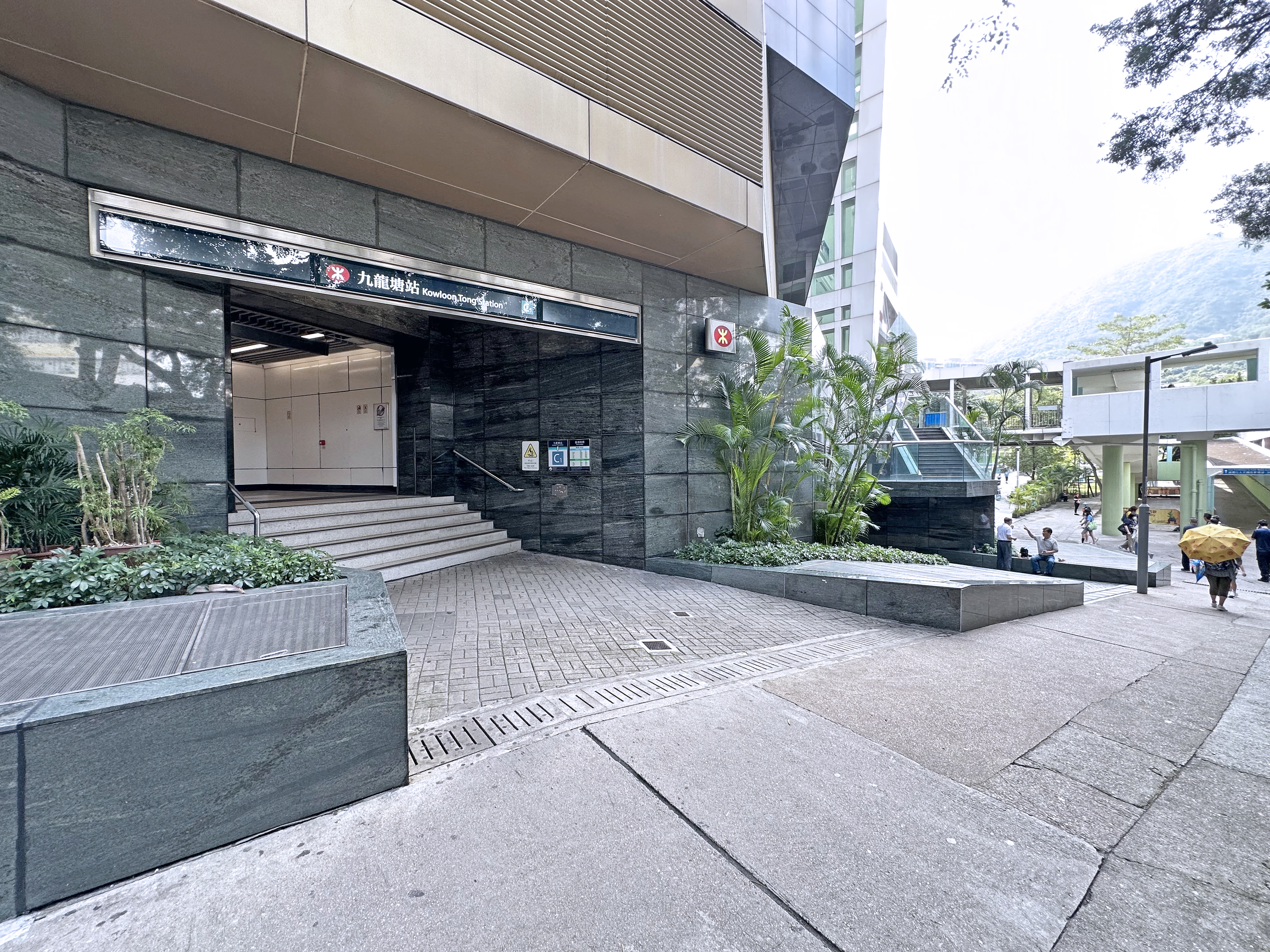
Exit C1

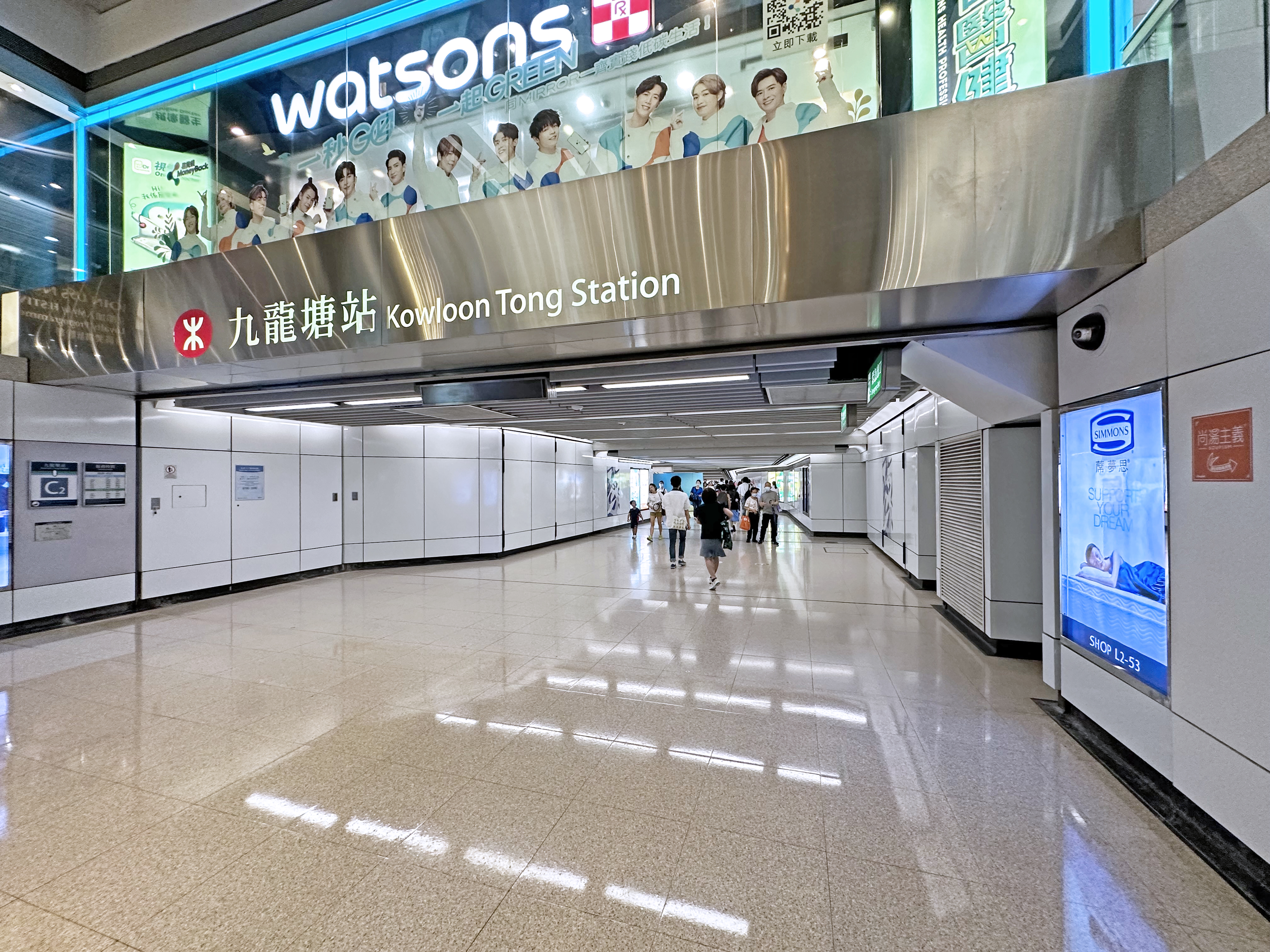
Exit C2

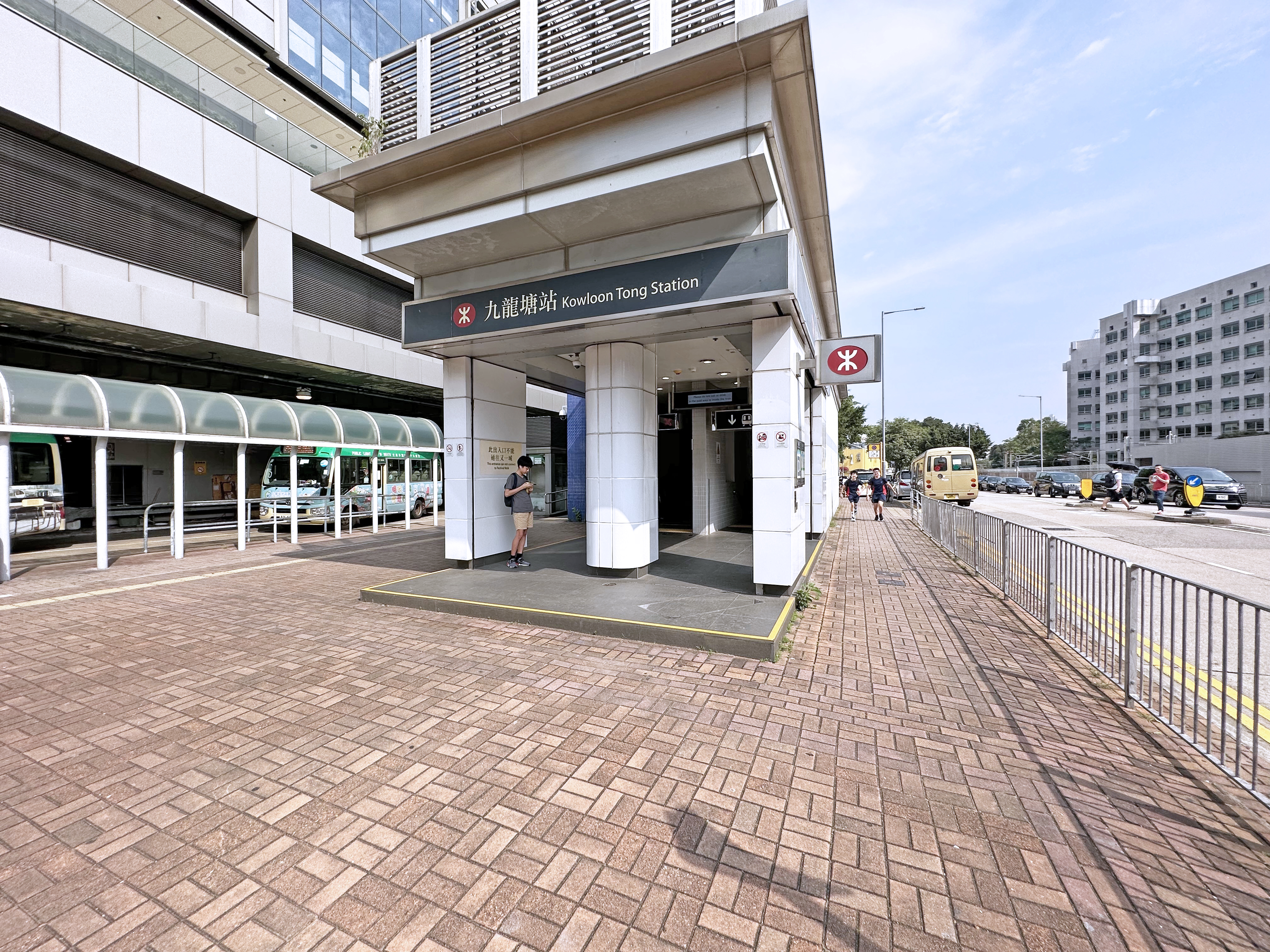
Exit D

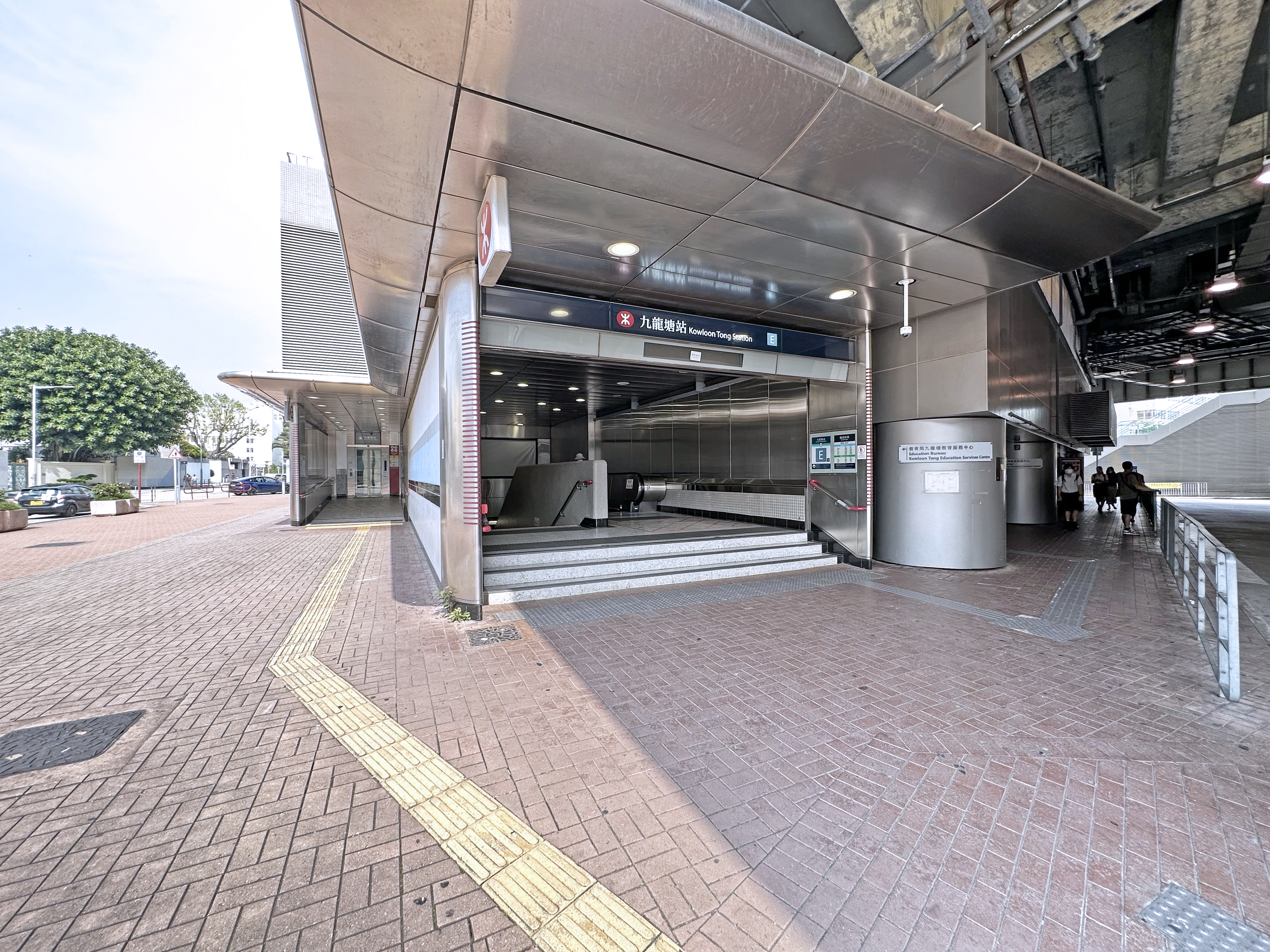
Exit E

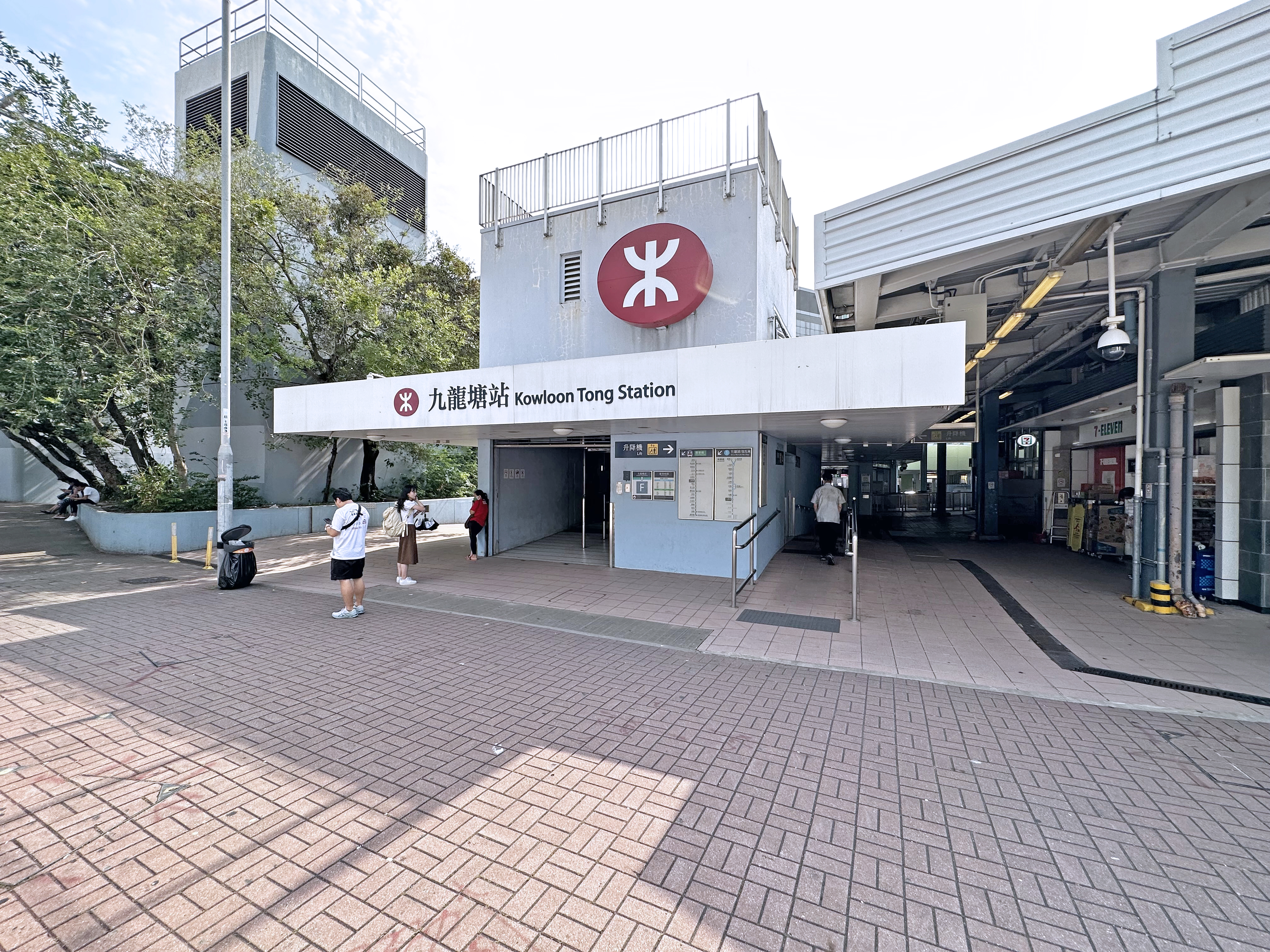
Exit F

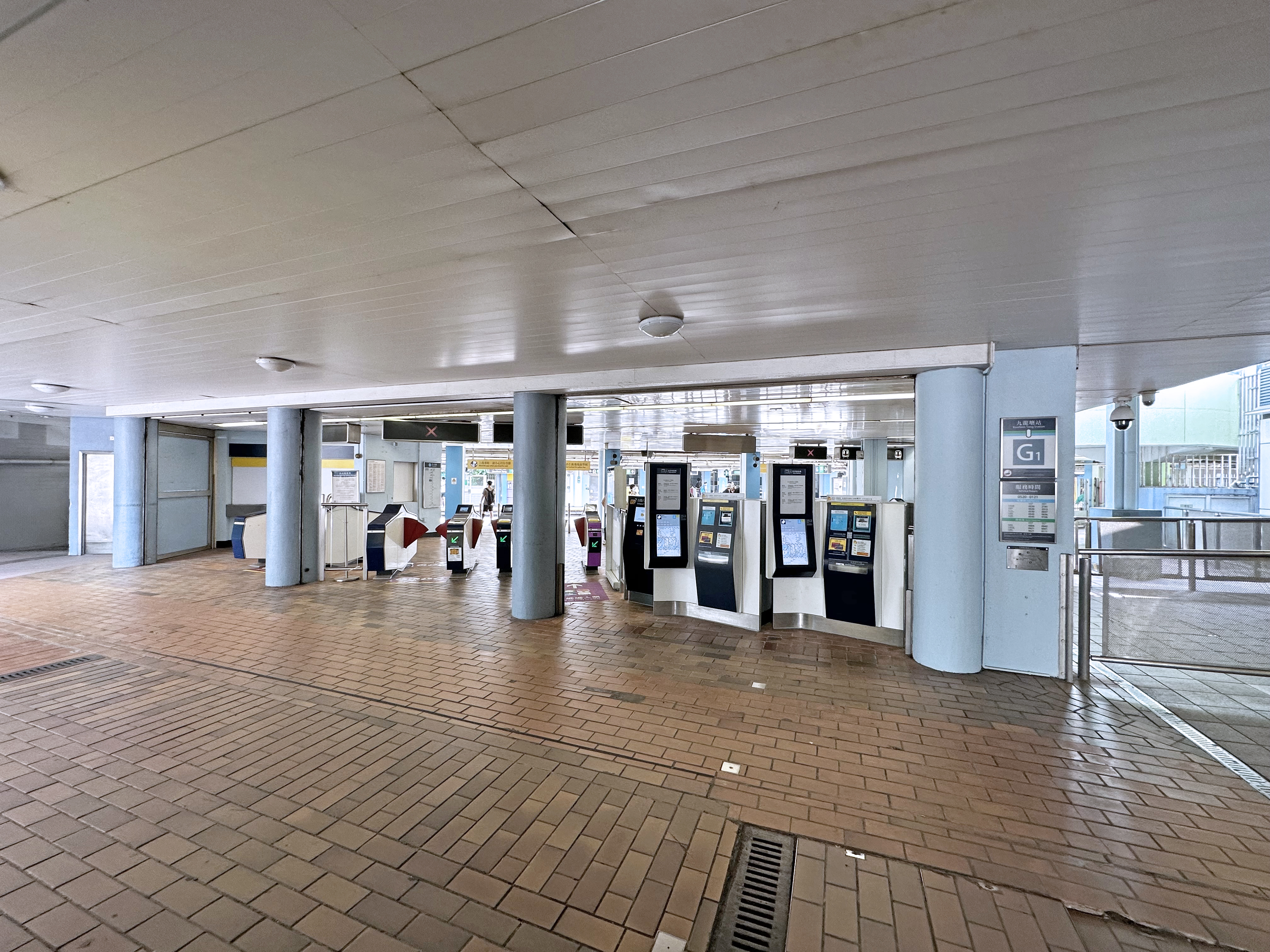
Exit G1

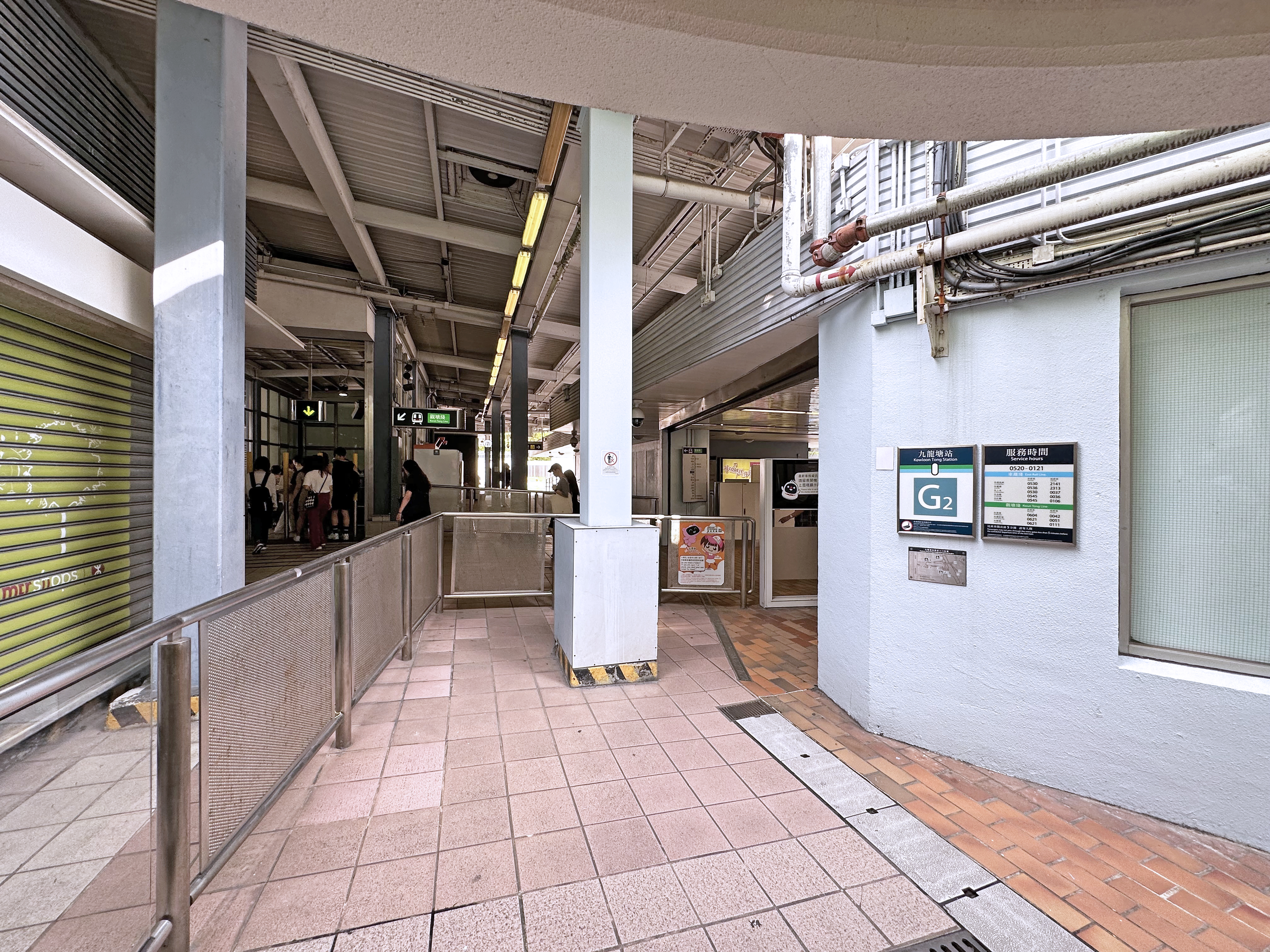
Exit G2

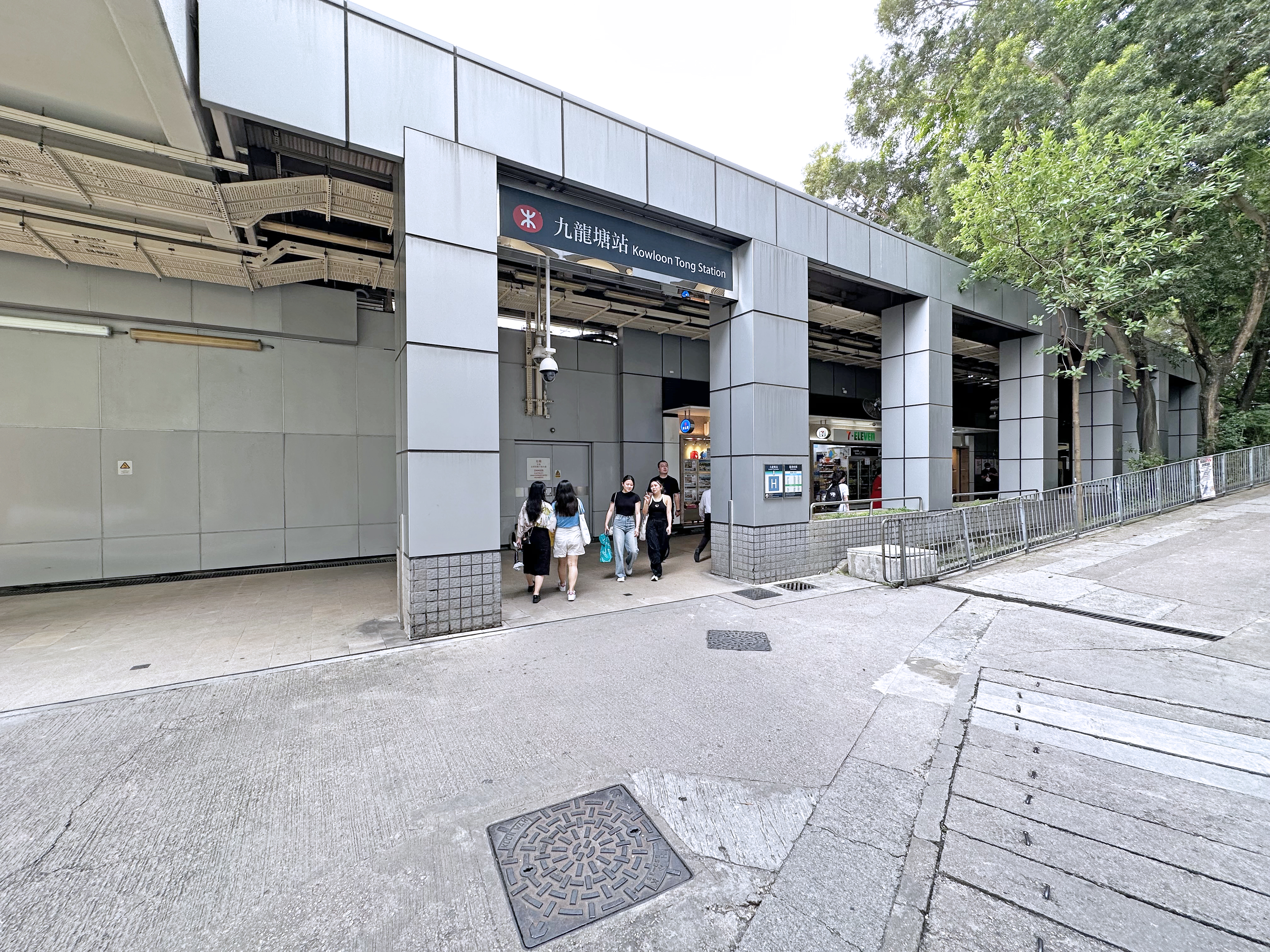
Exit H

== Gallery ==
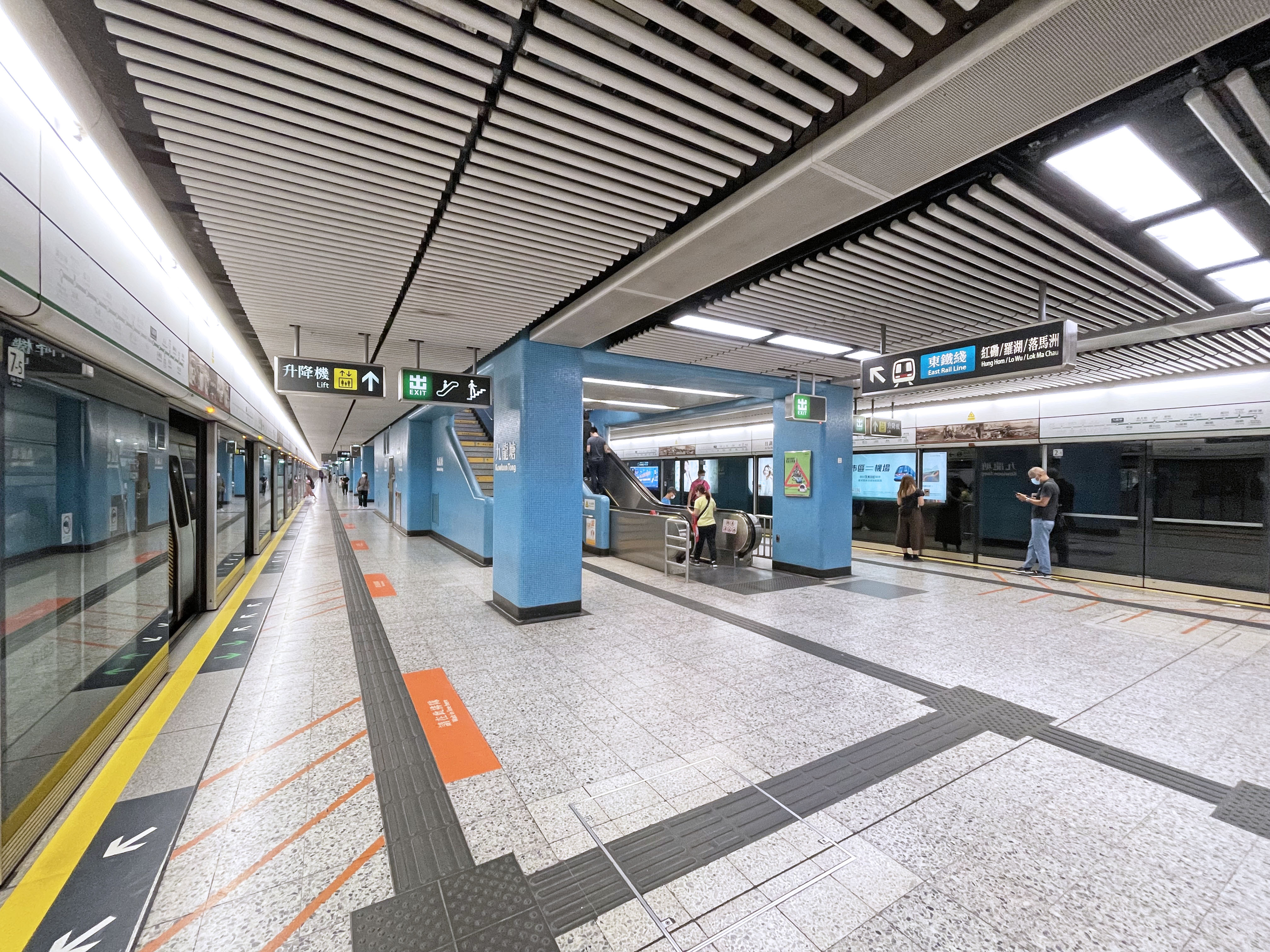
Kwun Tong line platforms (2022)

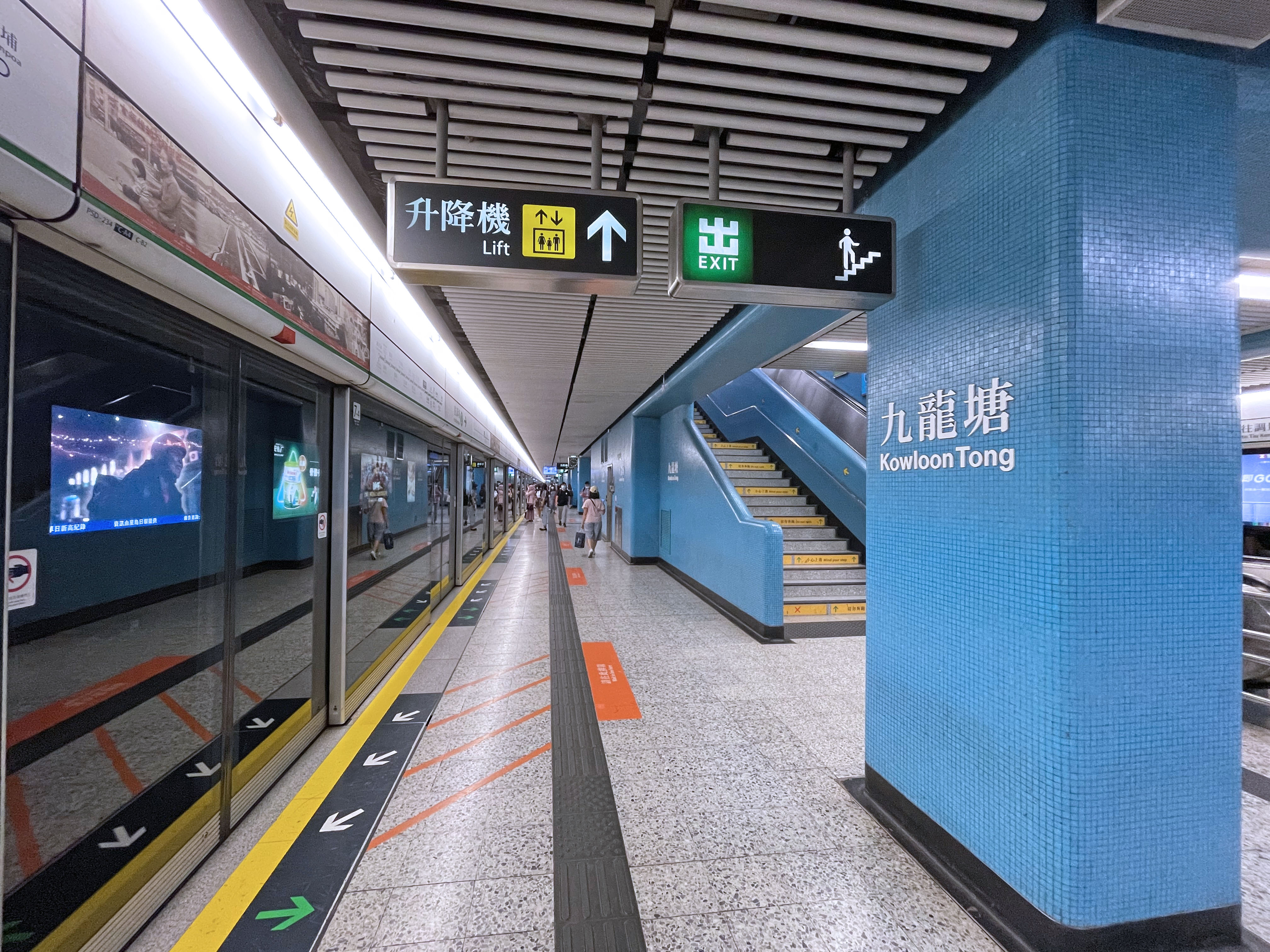
Kwun Tong line Platforms 4 (left) and 3 (right) (2021)

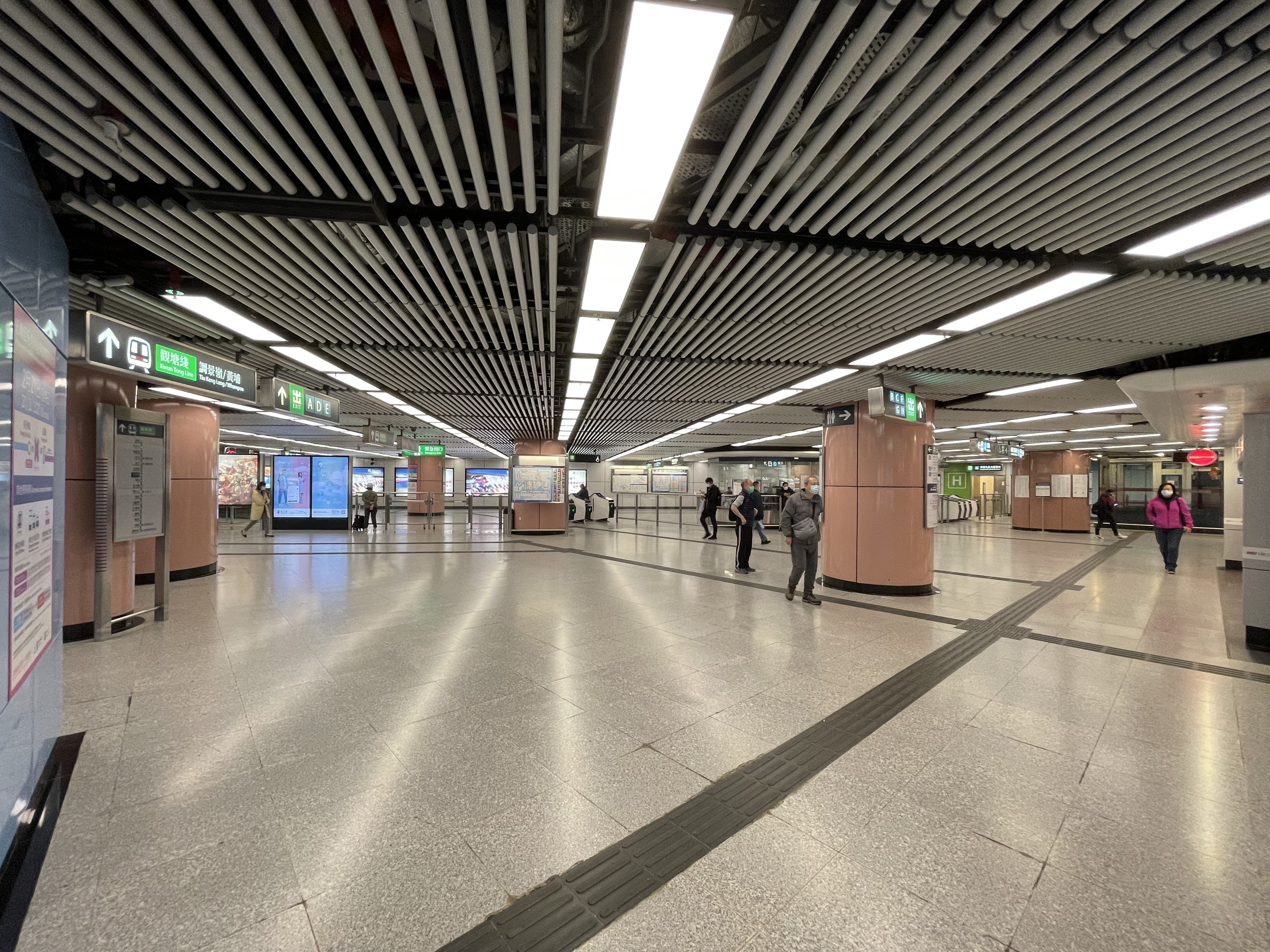
East Rail line northern concourse (2021)

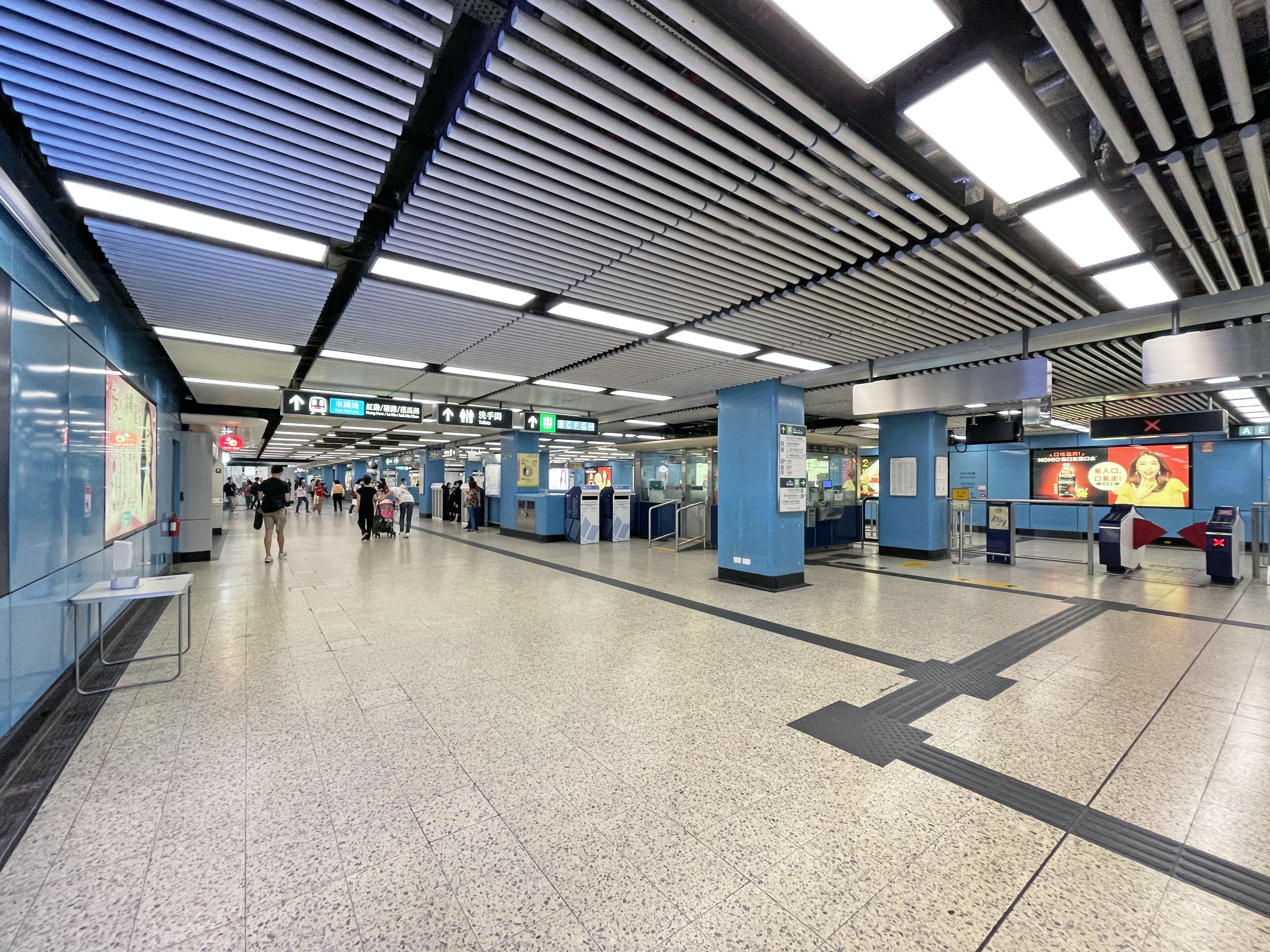
Paid area of the Kwun Tong line side concourse (2021)

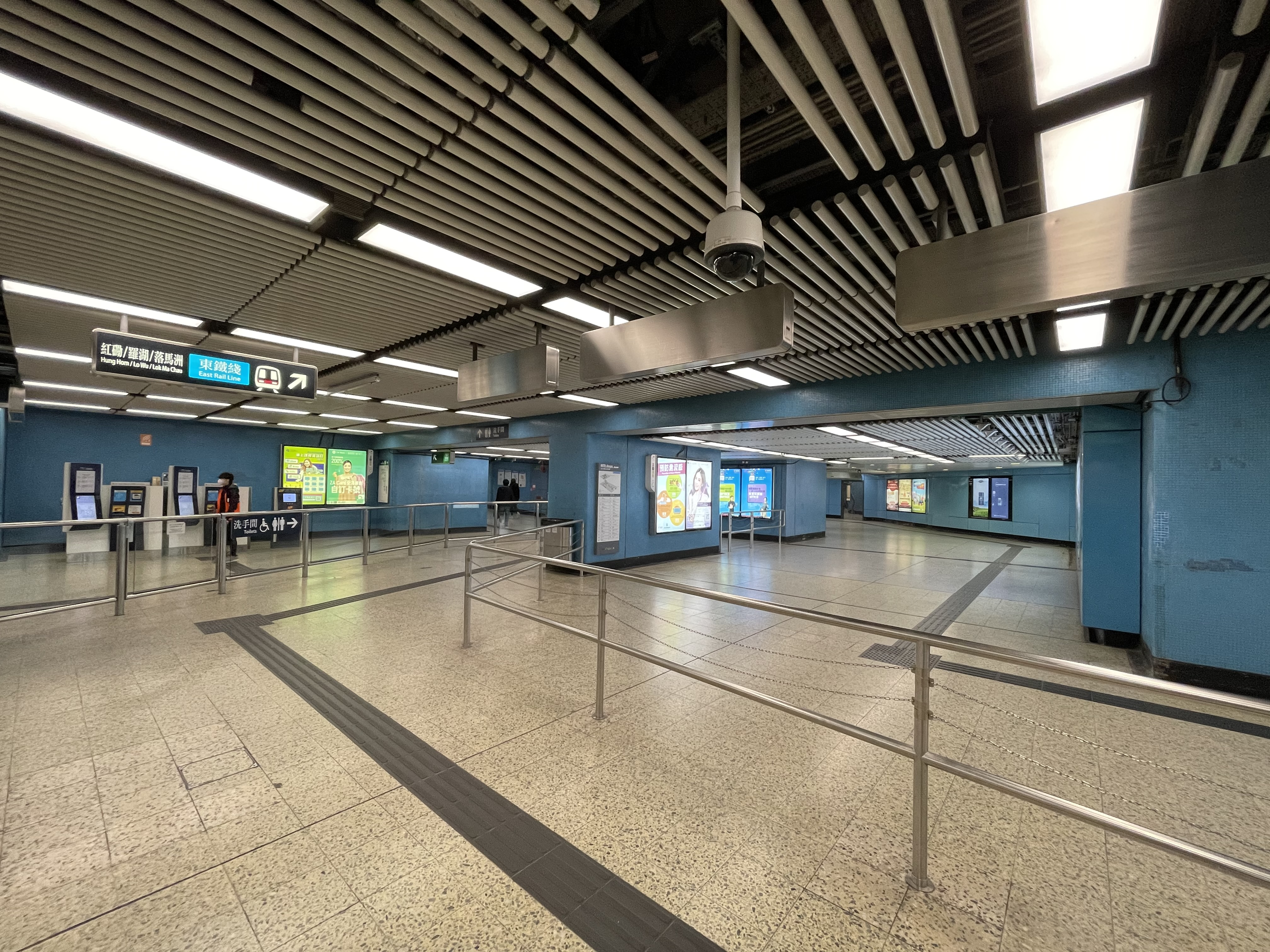
Transfer passageway between the Kwun Tong and East Rail line platforms (2021)

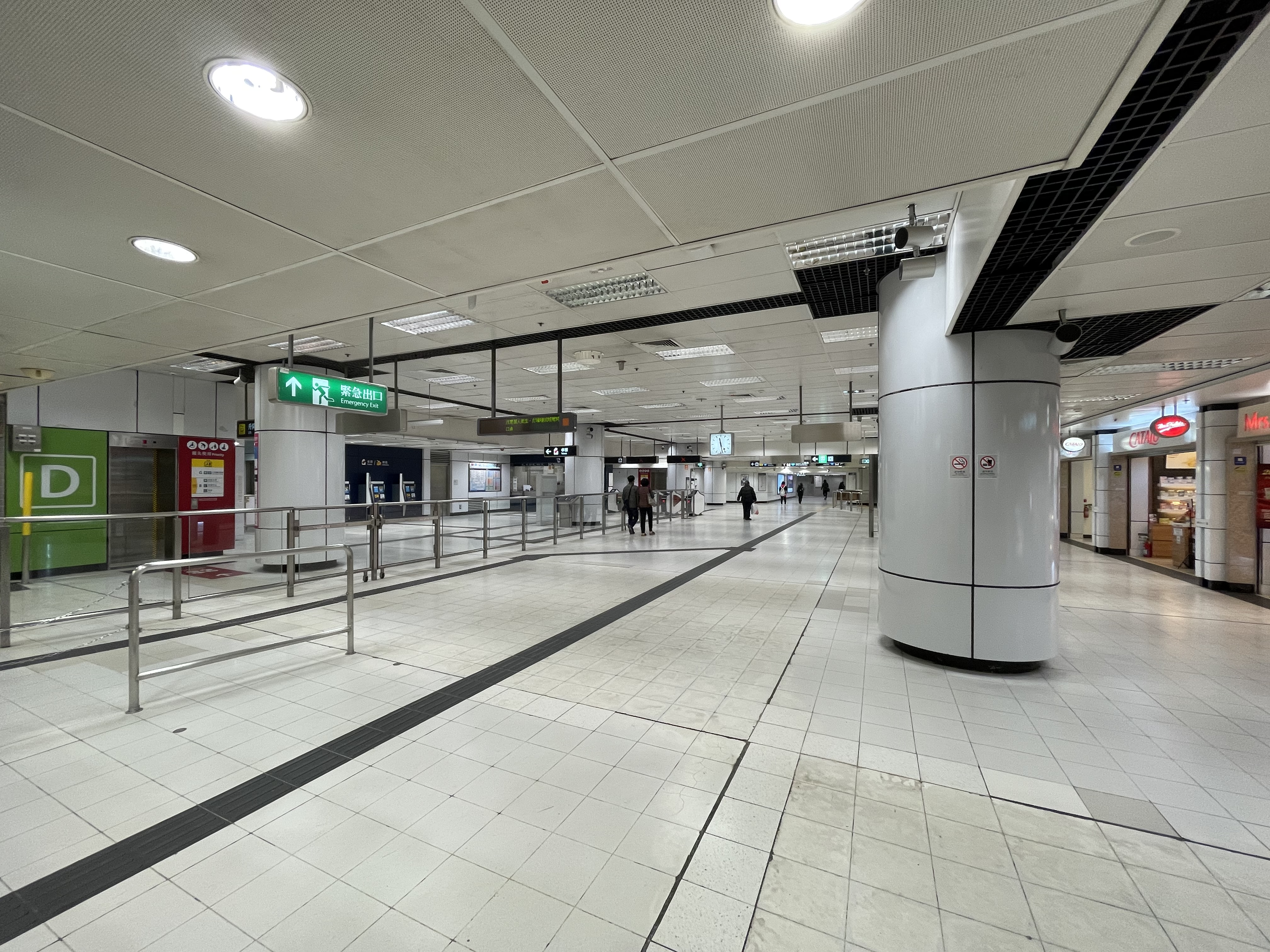
East Rail line southern concourse (2021)

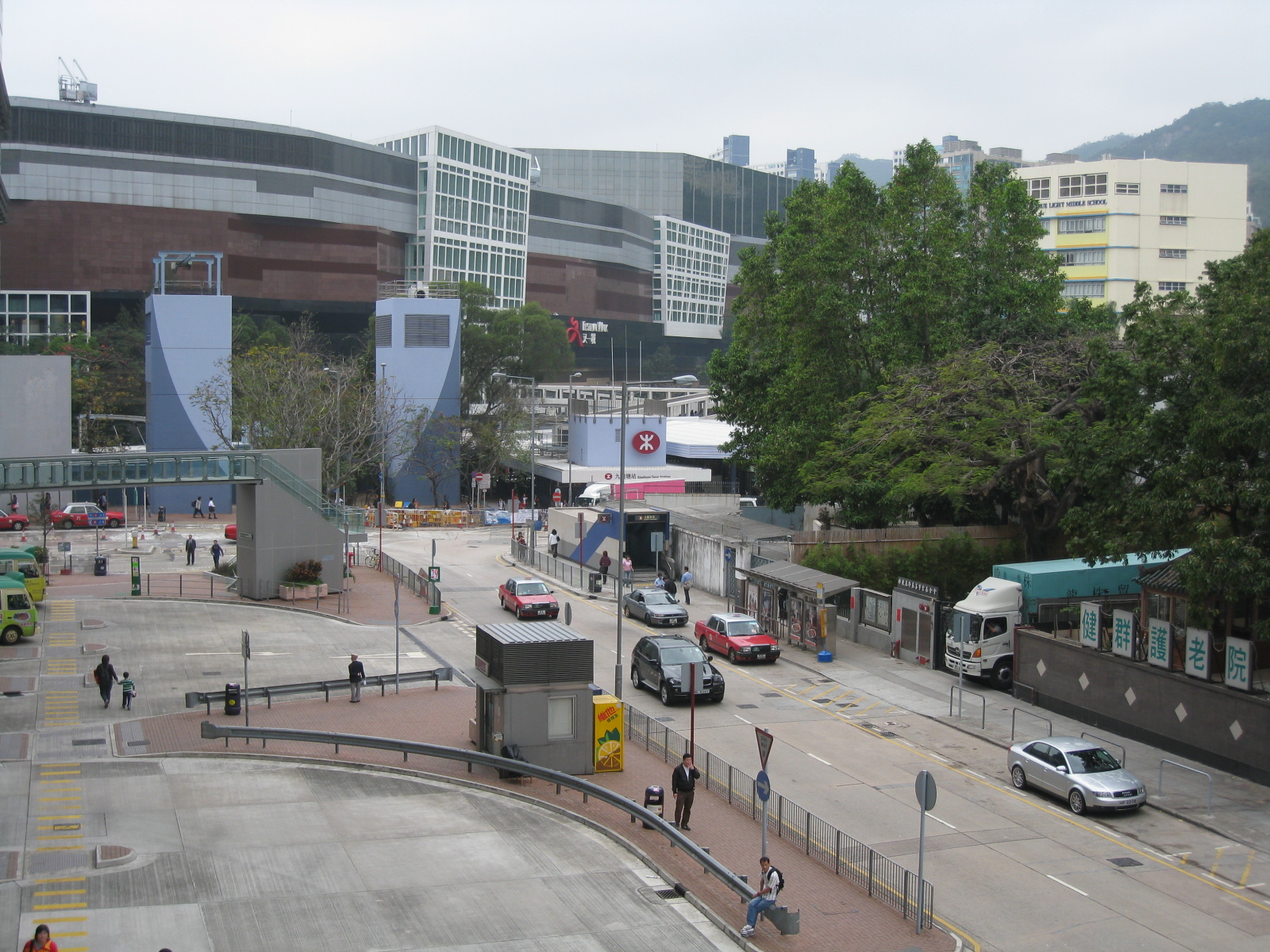
Ground level of Kowloon Tong station in February 2009
