= Festival Walk =

Shopping centre in Kowloon Tong, Hong Kong

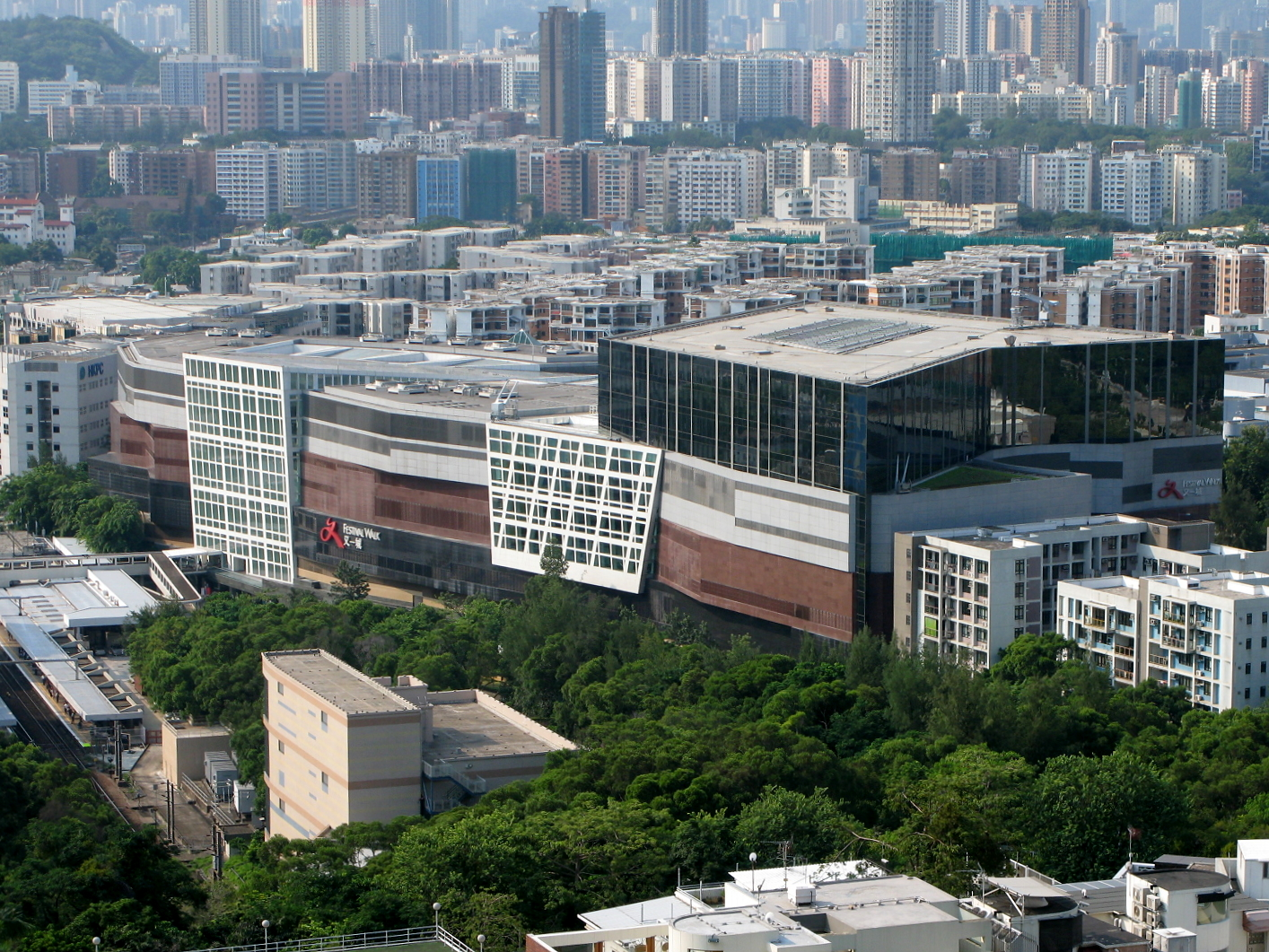
- Exterior view of Festival Walk
- Location: Yau Yat Chuen, Kowloon Tong, Hong Kong
- Coordinates: 22°20′13.92″N 114°10′28.89″E
- Address: 80 Tat Chee Avenue
- Opened: 13 November 1998; 27 years ago
- Developer: Swire Properties, CITIC Pacific
- Owner: Mapletree North Asia Commercial Trust
- Architect: Arquitectonica
- Num. of stores: 220
- Floor area: over 980,000 sq ft (91,000 m^{2})
- Floors: 7 floors
- Parking: 830 spaces
- Public transit: Kowloon Tong station
- Website: www.festivalwalk.com.hk

Festival Walk
- Chinese: 又一城
Transcriptions
Standard Mandarin
- Hanyu Pinyin: Yòuyīchéng
Hakka
- Romanization: yiu^{4}yat^{5}sang^{2}
Yue: Cantonese
- Yale Romanization: yau^{6} yat^{1} sing^{4}
- Jyutping: jau^{6} jat^{1} sing^{4}

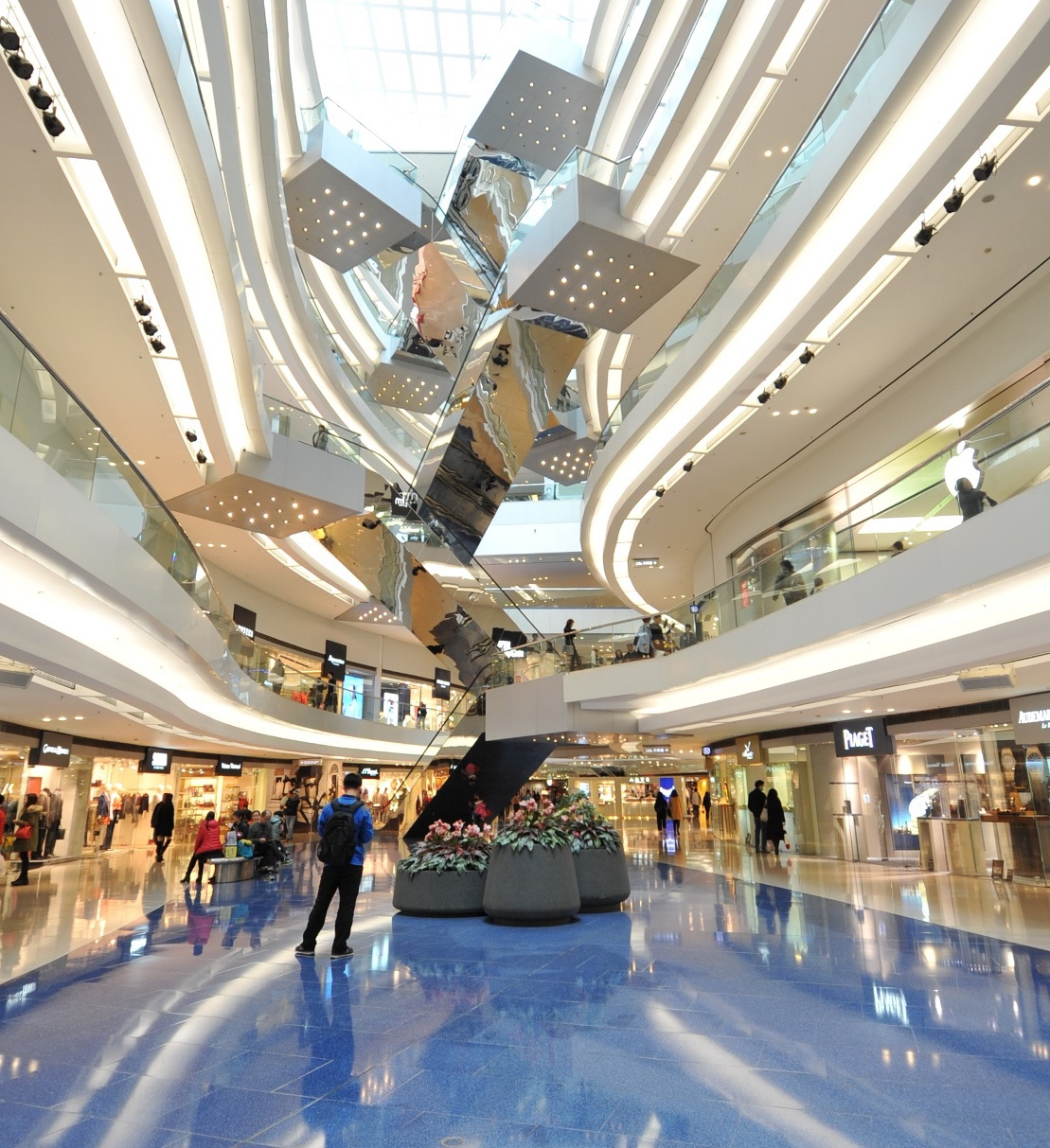
Criss-crossing escalators in the atrium

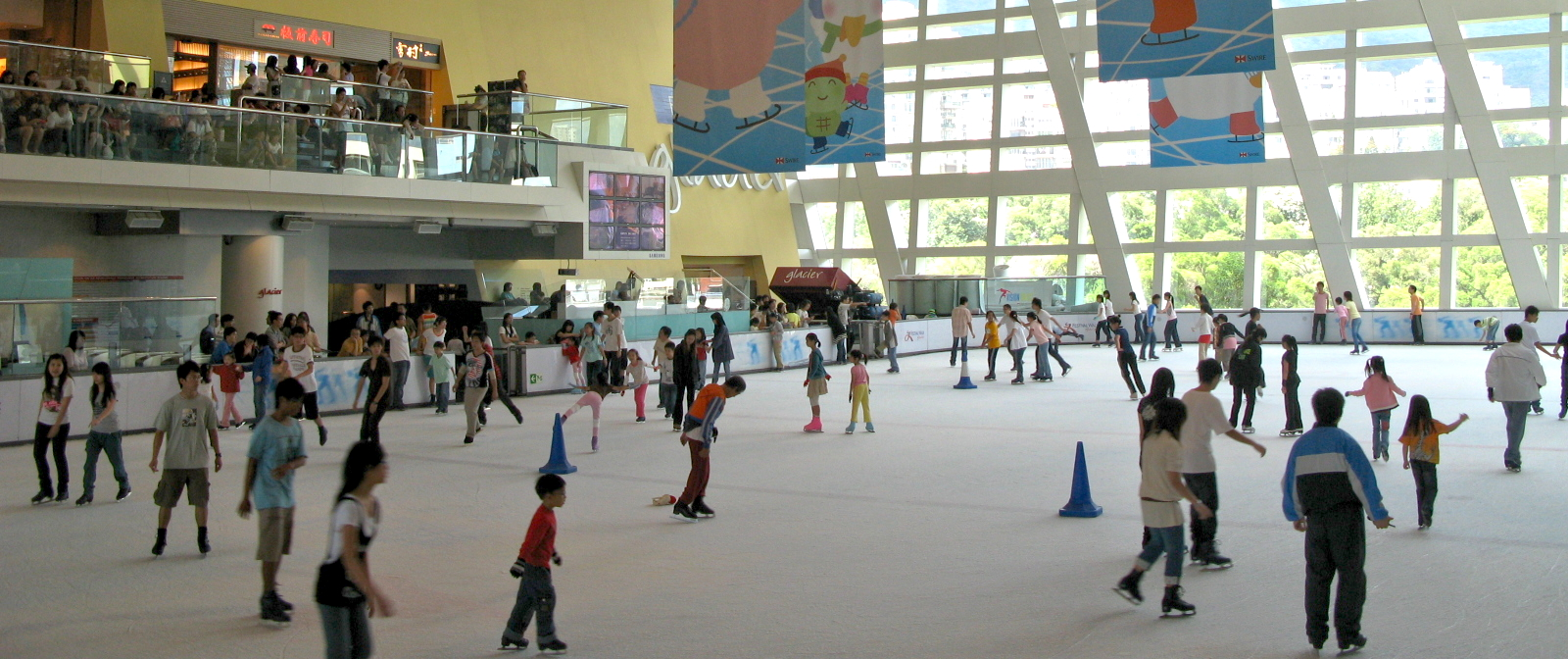
Glacier, the ice-skating rink

Festival Walk is a shopping centre in Kowloon Tong, Hong Kong developed jointly by Swire Properties and CITIC Pacific between 1993 and 1998. At the time of its opening in November 1998, it was the biggest shopping mall in Hong Kong. Festival Walk was acquired by Mapletree North Asia Commercial Trust ("MNACT"). There are also four floors of offices on top of the mall.

== Location ==
Festival Walk is located in Kowloon Tong, and is directly linked to Kowloon Tong station, which is an interchange station of the East Rail line and the Kwun Tong line of Hong Kong's Mass Transit Railway. It also has a pedestrian link to the City University of Hong Kong.

== History ==
Construction of the mall commenced in 1994 and was completed in 1998. Significant challenges were faced in the creation of the 21,000 m^{2} site due to its terraced land form as well as its narrow land shape. The tunnels for the Kwun Tong line of the MTR run through the full length of the site. During the construction of the building's four basement levels, 460,000 m³ of earth had to be removed.

Festival Walk was jointly owned by Swire Properties and CITIC Pacific until 2006, when Swire Properties bought out the 50% stake held by its partner. In July 2011, Mapletree Investments acquired the property for HK$18.8 billion (approximately US$2.4 billion), making it the world's largest retail real estate deal in 2011.

In 2015, it was announced that the AMC Cinema, a major anchor tenant, would move to Yuen Long due to a rent increase that the director of Broadway Circuit (operator of the AMC chain in Hong Kong) called "very astonishing". The AMC cineplex had been a tenant of Festival Walk for over 17 years. The cinema was replaced by an eight-screen Festival Grand Cinema in 2016.

== Stores and restaurants ==
Festival Walk has a variety of stores and restaurants on multiple levels.

== Configuration and positioning ==
Festival Walk comprises some one million square feet of retail space. It has approximately 220 shops and restaurants, a multiplex cinema and an ice rink. Located above the mall is an additional 220,000 square feet (20,000 m^{2}) of office space. Festival Walk's three level car park can accommodate up to 830 cars.

Festival Walk is positioned as a "comfortable" middle-market mall with the emphasis on service rather than price. The relatively spacious stores are mid-range to high-end and include brands such as Agnes B flagship store, Calvin Klein Jeans, Hollister, H&M, Juicy Couture and Kate Spade New York. Like malls in many western countries, Festival Walk has information booths to assist shoppers.

== Design and environmental features ==
The seven-storey shopping mall occupies three lower-ground levels, a ground level and three levels above ground. A six-level atrium, some 120 m long and 30 m wide atrium cuts longitudinally through the interior of the mall. A glass skylight over the atrium provides natural light to the interior of the building. There is a food court on the mall's topmost floor, with a view of the indoor skating rink.

Festival Walk is equipped with a waste management system for all food service outlets within the mall. An organic food digester was installed to accelerate the decomposition of food waste into waste water and food residue which is then discharged harmlessly into the sewerage system. The developers also installed a water-cooled air-conditioning system in 2002 at a cost of HK$13 million. The developer claims the system's high energy efficiency has saved 5 million kWh each year.

== Financial transactions ==
The development was a 50:50 joint venture between Swire Properties and CITIC Pacific. The partners secured the plot in a Government land auction in 1993 with a HK$2.9 billion bid, and developed it at an estimated cost of $2.2 billion. In January 2006, in Hong Kong's biggest property deal, Swire Properties paid HK$6.18 billion to buy out its partner's half share. In July 2007, it was announced that Swire Pacific was contemplating listing the property as a real estate investment trust. In July 2011, Mapletree Investments acquired Festival Walk at a property value of HK$18.8 billion which was the largest global retail real estate deal in 2011 In 2013, Festival Walk was divested to Mapletree's fourth real estate investment trust, the Mapletree Greater China Commercial Trust, as one of its two seed assets in 2013. In 2018, Mapletree Greater China Commercial Trust renamed as Mapletree North Asia Commercial Trust upon completion of acquisition of the Japan portfolio. The mall is now managed by Mapletree North Asia Property Management Limited.

== Incidents ==
=== 2014 roof damage ===
Water leaking into the mall

At approximately 9:00 pm (0800 GMT) on 30 March 2014 hailstones the size of golf-balls shattered the ceiling windows of Festival Walk during a heavy thunderstorm, causing rain to pour straight into the interior of the mall. Some sections of interior ceiling collapsed and ankle-deep flooding was reported. Water from the shopping mall overflowed into the attached railway station. Mapletree Greater China Commercial Trust Management, the manager of Mapletree Greater China Commercial Trust, which owns Festival Walk, said its staff were on site to render assistance. However, mall management were criticised for failing to alert the public through the mall's website and via relevant social media networks. Evacuation of the public was also done poorly, as at 10:00 pm the public was still on scene sending live images to social media networks.

=== 2019–2020 Hong Kong protests ===
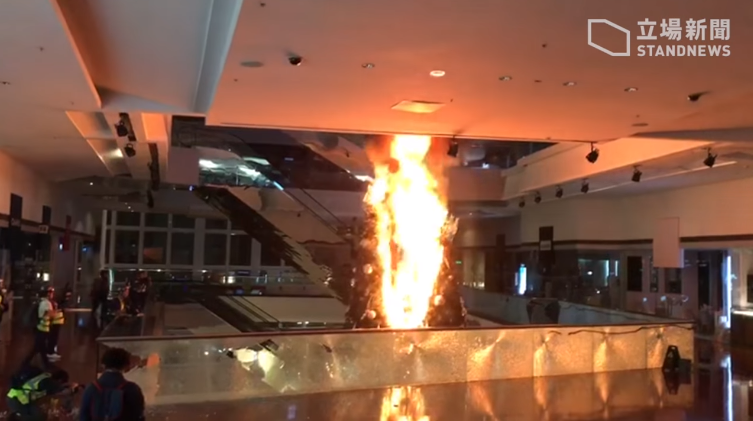
The Festival Walk Christmas tree set ablaze by protesters.

In the evening on a Tuesday, 12 November 2019, Festival walk was stormed and vandalized by protesters. Many of the glass barriers were shattered leaving broken glass scattered in the main areas of the mall, including the main entrance and bottom floors, most ground floor windows in the mall were also shattered or vandalized. The Christmas tree, set up every year inside Festival Walk to celebrate Christmas, was set on fire by rioters using Molotov cocktails and petrol bombs. The fire was dealt with using hoses.

== See also ==
- Ice rinks in Hong Kong
