= Yau Yat Tsuen =

Yau Yat Tsuen 又一村
- Area
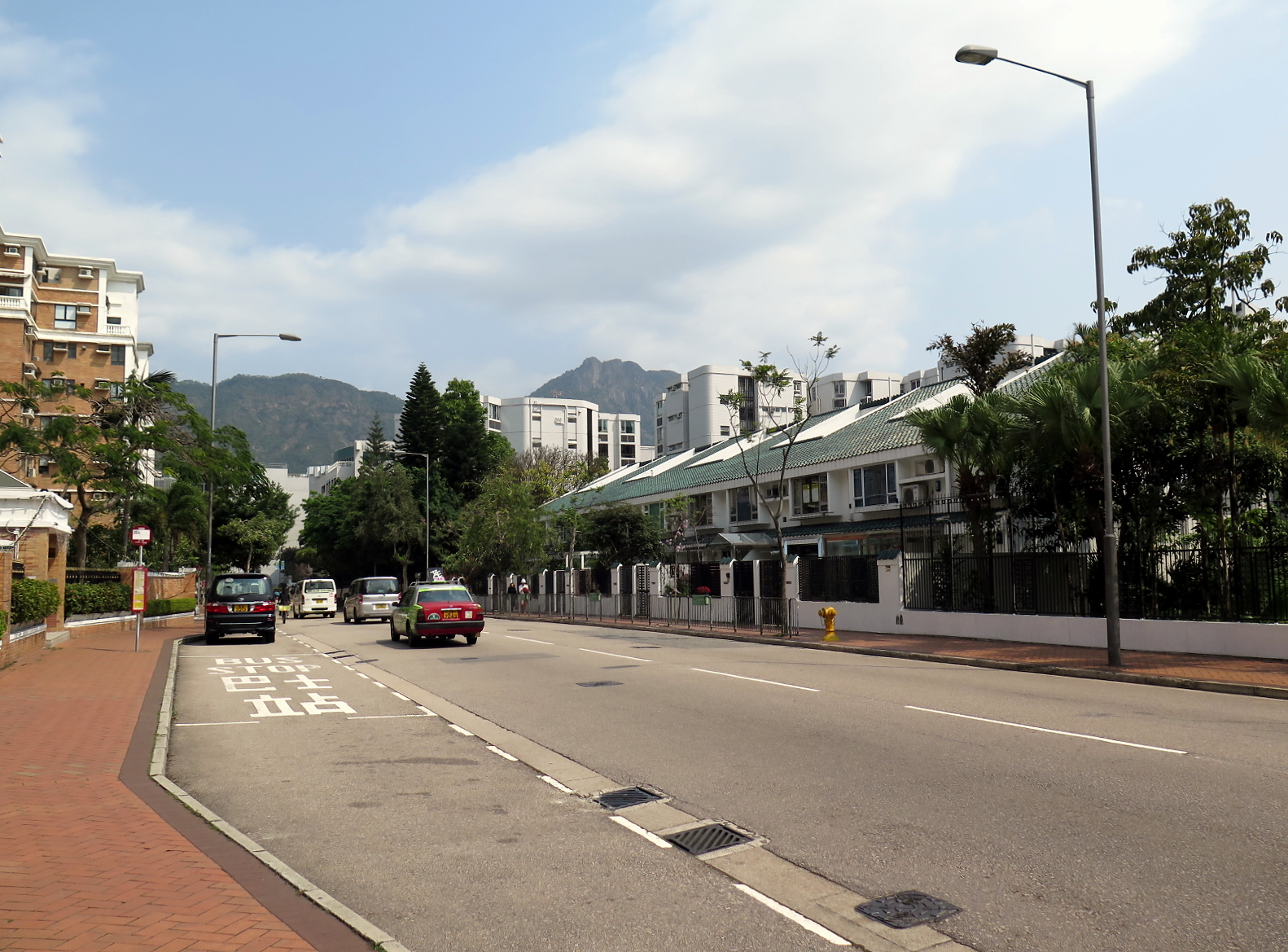
- Tat Chee Avenue, the main road in Yau Yat Tsuen

- Location within Hong Kong
- Coordinates: 22°19′51″N 114°10′26″E
- Country: Hong Kong
- Region: Kowloon
- District: Sham Shui Po
- Founder: Yu Tat Chi

Government
  - Type: District Council
  - Councillor: Dominic Lee Tsz-king (Liberal)

Population (2015)
  - Total: 16,484
- Time zone: UTC+08:00 (HKT)

Yau Yat Tsuen
- Traditional Chinese: 又一村
Transcriptions
Standard Mandarin
- Hanyu Pinyin: Yòuyīcūn
Yue: Cantonese
- Jyutping: jau6 jat1 cyun1

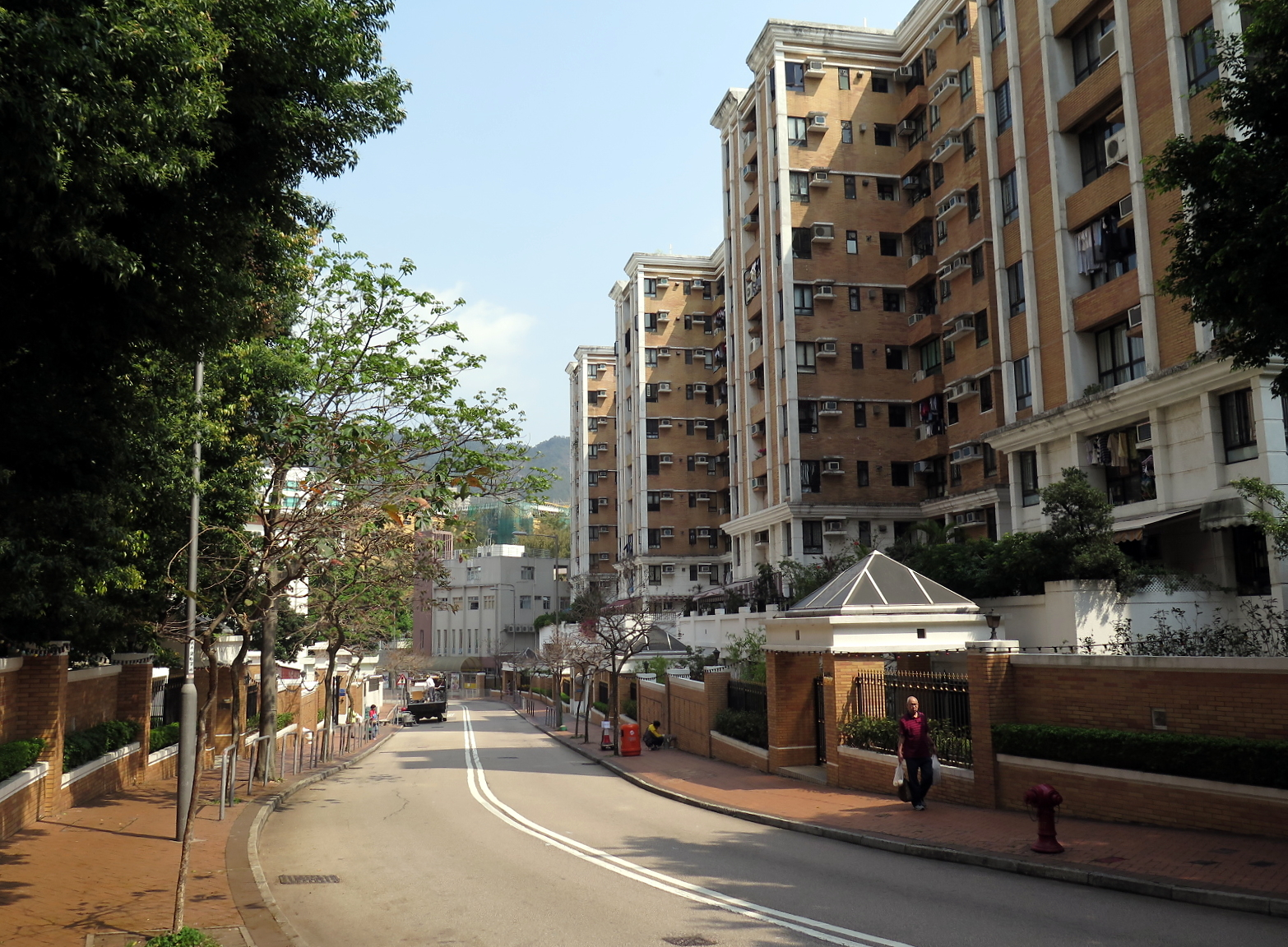
Parc Oasis is the main private housing inside Yau Yat Chuen

Yau Yat Tsuen or Yau Yat Chuen (Chinese: 又一村; Jyutping: jau6 jat1 cyun1) is one of the very few low density upscale neighbourhoods in the central urban area of Kowloon, Hong Kong. It is located in North Kowloon, at the foot of Beacon Hill. An electoral constituency of Sham Shui Po District is also named after the neighbourhood.

== Naming ==
The area's name comes from a poem by Southern Song era poet Lu You, titled Touring Shanxi Village. The name comes from the fourth verse in the poem (柳暗花明又一村; Láuh am fā mìhng yauh yāt chyūn), which translates to Then out of the shade of the willows, came bright flowers and another village. Hence, the area's name literally translates to "another village".

== Facilities ==
As a primarily residential area, there are relatively few services inside Yau Yat Tsuen. There is a small supermarket, a few property agents, a post office and a few other local stores. However a large shopping centre, Festival Walk, is on the edge of the village. It consists of 200 stores including a cinema and an ice-skating rink. The whole area of Yau Yat Tsuen is also within walking distance from the Kwun Tong line (Shek Kip Mei and Kowloon Tong) and East Rail line (Kowloon Tong) of MTR, the only mass transit railway operator of Hong Kong.

== History ==
After the Second World War, affluent families built large detached houses in the area of Yau Yat Tsuen. Since then, it has been expanded and covers a much larger area. Along with the neighbouring Kowloon Tong and Beacon Hill, the area has some of the most exclusive and expensive residential properties in Kowloon.

== Development ==
=== 1970s ===
In the 1970s, some of the large houses were subdivided into approximately ten flats in each block. However, with high property prices in Hong Kong, these 3 or 4 bedroom flats, which tend to cost more than 7 million Hong Kong dollars, are still prohibitively expensive for a large section of the Hong Kong population.

=== 1980s ===
In the 1980s, the large development scheme of Village Garden was constructed and more 1,000 to 2,400 square feet (93 to 223 m^{2}) flats and houses were built.

=== 1990s ===
In the early 1990s Yau Yat Tsuen continued to expand with the development of Parc Oasis, where more than twenty 10-storey blocks were developed. In 1992 the nearby Polytechnic gained University status and became the City University of Hong Kong.

== Education ==
- Chan Shu Kui Memorial School

Yau Yat Tsuen is in Primary One Admission (POA) School Net 40. Within the school net are multiple aided schools (operated independently but funded with government money) and two government schools: Fuk Wing Street Government Primary School and Li Cheng Uk Government Primary School.
