= Joseph Cucchiara =

Italian Catholic priest in China (1882 - 1966)

The Reverend Joseph Cucchiara SDB
- Priest
- Native name: Giuseppe Cucchiara
- Church: Catholic Church
- Diocese: Diocese of Shiu Chow; Diocese of Hong Kong

Orders
- Ordination: 1915

Personal details
- Born: December 19, 1882 Girgenti, Sicily, Kingdom of Italy
- Died: December 18, 1966 (aged 83) British Hong Kong
- Denomination: Catholic
- Occupation: Missionary

Joseph Cucchiara (Italian: Giuseppe Cucchiara; Chinese: 郭怡雅; 19 December 1882 – 18 December 1966) was a notable Italian Roman Catholic missionary to China. He was born in Girgenti, Sicily, Kingdom of Italy in 1882. He joined Salesians of Don Bosco in 1907. After the outbreak of World War I, he followed the armies and served in hospitals.

== Biography ==
Giuseppe Cucchiara was born in Girgenti, a city on the southern coast of Sicily. He joined the Salesians of Don Bosco in 1907 and was ordained priest in 1915.

He was delegated to the Diocese of Shiu Chow of Kwangtung (modern-day Guangdong) in 1919. He worked hard and founded many churches and schools in the area. Most of these structures were seized after communist invasion. He was then sent to work in Aberdeen Technical School in Hong Kong. At the meantime, he helped the sisters of Sisters Announcers of the Lord from Shiu Chow to Hong Kong. He dedicated much effort to help the sisters open Tak Nga Primary School and Tak Nga Secondary School. In 1931, he published Tre anni di bolscevismo in Cina: la missione salesiana di Shiu-chow durante il periodo 1926–1929, detailing the terror and destruction of Bolshevism in the Vicariate of Shiu Chow. He died in Canossa Hospital on 18 December 1966 and buried in Happy Valley, Hong Kong.

The sisters from Sisters Announcers of the Lord founded a school on Tsing Yi Island and named it Father Cucchiara Memorial School to memorise his contribution.
