= Thy Lab =

Independent art space in Hong Kong

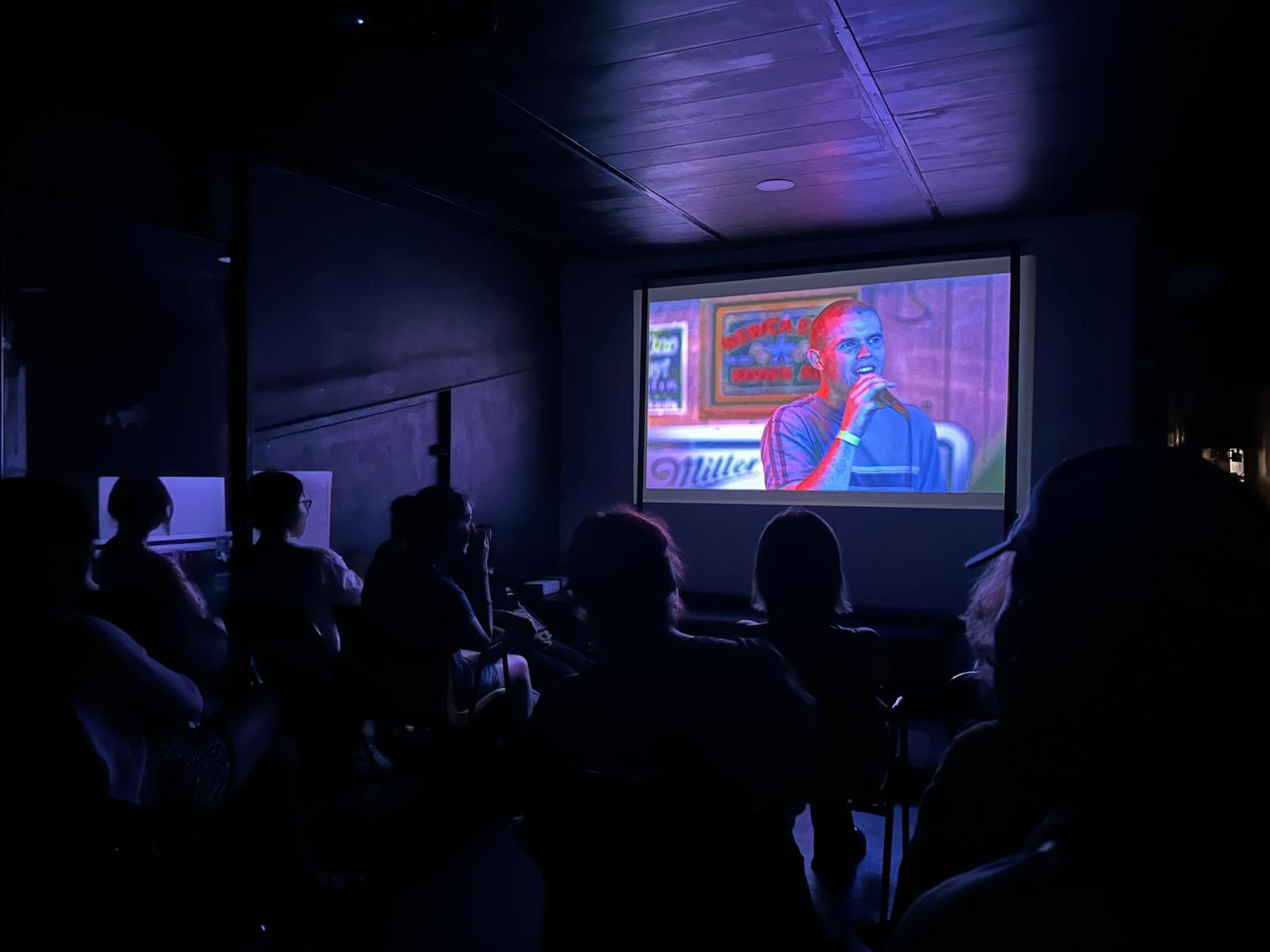
a screening at Thy Lab, Hong Kong.

Thy Lab (Chinese: 旲堂) is an independent art space in Hong Kong with a focus on visual research, film, performance art, and educational programs. It is home to a collection of Hong Kong home-made movies and family photographs, which constitutes the largest collection of found footage in Hong Kong, comprising 9.000 items donated by local residents.

Located in Sham Shui Po, the space is also used as an artist-run squat as it occupies a re-purposed Hong Kong rooftop slum that is turned into a theatre with free admission policy. Since 2013, the back alley space has been occupied, reclaimed as a 24-hour open-air public art museum, and renamed as Thy Lane Museum.

Hosting screenings, performances, and workshops, Thy Lab has produced collectively-authored films, performances and exhibitions, and has trained around 500 filmmakers and performers. Since 2013, the space hosted international artists and scholars, notably South Korean filmmaker Kim Ki Duk, Italian actor Marco Paolini, philosopher Gabriel Rockhill and Hong Kong actress Maggie Cheung. Through a series of retrospectives, it introduced the work of various master film and theatre artists to Hong Kong, including Jean Rouch., Romeo Castellucci, Richard Williams, Silvano Agosti, Gian Maria Volontè.

In 2024, it celebrated its 10-years anniversary with the immersive performative gala Thieves, An Auction of Stolen Art, and in 2025, Academia Sinica in Taipei organised a retrospective of its art and research work.

== Recognition and awards ==
Thy Lab's work has been presented at international theatre, film and arts festivals -including Slamdance Film Festival, Vienna Biennale, Hong Kong Art Festival, at National Museum of Ethnology Japan, Kunstkamera in St. Petersburg, Casa D'Italia in Montréal, Hong Kong History Museum. Its artistic and ethnographic practice was discussed at academic and research institutions worldwide including the Universities of Tokyo, Manchester, Bologna, Toronto, the Vienna Anthropology Days conference, the European Association of Social Anthropologists, and the main universities in Hong Kong.

Early works include Michelle, (presented at Vienna Biennale 2008) on the situation of the Jewish minority in Kaifeng, China; Xiao Pengke -in competition at Torino Film Festival and best director prize winner at Italian Cineclub Federation Festival 2009, a portrait of Shanghai-based female punk poetess of the same name; Angeles City philippines, (best documentary prize at Forli International Film Festival, audience award at Potenza International Film Festival, best Italian short film award at Cortoinbra Film Festival) a collective portrait of the largest destination for sex tourism in Asia; Kafi Och Babu, in competition at Days of Ethnographic Cinema Moscow on the integration of young Bengali migrants in Stockholm; Diary of a Sex Tourist, technical support winner at Filmbasen Film Stockholm AB Fund, in competition at Bergamo Film Meeting, an experimental montage entirely based on online found footage.

In 2020, the public art performance Via Dolorosa based on found photography, was presented at the Hong Kong International Photo Festival 2020.

The ethnographic film Azov (2016), a one-year observational documentary of the Ukrainian military unit of the same name Azov Regiment, a montage of soldiers' combat body cameras and footage, "exploring the relationship between nationalism and war" BBC News. The film screened simultaneously in universities across Europe on November 21, 2016, with a televised discussion moderated by Ukrainian youth, and has since been withdrawn citing "safety concerns for its protagonists".

Thy Lab's subsequent feature Dea was "a blend of feature and documentary, exploring the mechanisms of exploitation in today’s world and the industry of foreign domestic workers". It participated as a work in progress at the Visions du Reel market in 2020, and was invited to Royal Anthropological Institute International Festival of Ethnographic Film, the National Museum of Ethnology Japan and DMZ Docs Festival. Starring Indonesian actress Dea Panendra in the title role, the movie constitutes the last appearance of late Italian actor and writer Bruno Zanin -here in a semi-autobiographical role, previously known as the protagonist of Fellini's Amarcord. Dea won a special mention at the Cineteca di Bologna Visioni Italiane Festival in 2021, with the jury stating: "Crossing the line between fiction and documentary, Dea restages the events told in an acting workshop, and offers an intense and warm portrait of an Indonesian woman who migrated to Hong Kong." Montréal-based Cinema Cinéma Public invited the film for a special screening in 2024 describing it as "a rare example of a thoroughly independent Hong Kong (neo)realism: a Dardenne-esque portrait of a young woman from Indonesia that makes visible the lives of the overseas workers who enable Hong Kong’s middle-class to accumulate capital, who raise their children and do their groceries, while suffering the brunt of the city’s ungrateful, economic violence". Film writer Aidan Croft labeled it as "a totally new and revolutionary cinematic language that's microscopic and hypervigilant, expansive and inclusive, insurgent and anti-capitalist"; Variety: "the only film I know of where foreign domestic workers play an active role in telling their own experience in Hong Kong". Claira Curtis from Letterboxd reviewed "grounded in its authentic depiction of a reality thousands women are living at this very moment. I was onboard from start to finish".

In 2022, Artnet reported on Thy Lab's Uninvited Trilogy performance at 59th Venice Biennale in Italy, Documenta Fifteen in Kassel and Art Basel in Hong Kong "infiltrating the art world’s big three global events earlier this summer: the Venice Biennale, Art Basel in Switzerland, and Documenta Kassel. Site-specific performances tailored to hot takes surrounding each event. In Venice, the staged traveling “Scythian Pavilion” commented on the Biennale’s nationalistic approach; in Basel, the second iteration of their “Ghost of the Author” booth concerned speculation in the art market; and in Kassel, a new group edition of their Chicken Blood performance questioned who gets put into the art-historical canon".

In 2024 Art Forum reported on Thy Lab's tenth-anniversary Gala performance Thieves—An Auction of Stolen Artworks: "all the artworks were “stolen” (invisible), including Andy Warhol’s Invisible Sculpture and Maurizio Cattelan's Untitled, and all the auction proceeds went to benefit Thy Lab's operating budget". Italian art publication Exibart published the performance's menu of Invisible Food.

In September 2024, Thy Lab managed to access the long-unused Hong Kong Confucius Temple, setting a sound rendition of Dante's Inferno in the 1935 Grade 1 historic building. Produced by Italian theatre company Societas Raffaello Sanzio, the piece Exercises for Voice and Cello on Dante's Divine Comedy marked the Hong Kong debut of Societas founder Chiara Guidi, creating a convergence between Confucius and Dante "both on transcendence and self improvement".

On December 8, 2024, Thy Lab premiered immersive theatre performance Water Margin on the Woh Chai Shan mountain, activating its 1904 romanesque water reservoir. The piece engaged twenty performers among students of the Chinese University of Hong Kong and the elders who for decades built folk architecture on the mountain. The night show invited the audience to discover ethnographic performances around the mountain's dark forest with torches. Local cultural magazine The Culturist reviewed the work: "it combines creative imaging with social research, once again an exceptional art performance in a mysterious area of Hong Kong." An anthropological survey of the elderly, Water Margin was inspired by the students' private lives, using the mountain as a metaphor for Hong Kong. "The war dance choreography is inspired by Dembeat, as it was invented by university students in Hong Kong and is 100% local.”

== Selected works ==
• Michelle (short film, 2008)

• Xiao Pengke (documentary film, 2008)

• Angeles City, philippines (documentary film, 2009)

• Born To Live (documentary film, 2009)

• Amadeo, philippines (documentary film, 2009)

• Matrimony (documentary series, 2010)

• Diary of a Sex Tourist (experimental film, 2011)

• A po Vjen Prishtine (documentary film, 2011)

• Chinese Dreams I (screening series, 2012)

• The Man of the Crowd (performance, 2012-2014)

• Kafi och Babu (documentary film, 2012)

• This Summer in Kosovo (documentary film, 2012)

• THY Lane Museum (2013-2024)

• Chinese Dreams II (screening series, 2013)

• Skills Mismatch (documentary series, 2013)

• Wu Wen Guang: Hong Kong Folk Memory Project (screening and workshop series, 2014)

• Le Tour Des Balkans (documentary film, 2014)

• Fail to Succeed (documentary series, 2015)

• The Cinema of Claudio Caligari (screening series, 2015)

• Umbrella Memories (documentary, 2015)

• The Iranian New Wave: Naderi, Kiarostami, Makhmalbaf (screening series, 2015)

• The Cinema of Francesco Rosi (screening series, 2015)

• The Cinema of Dušan Makavejev (screening series, 2015)

• The Eel (short film, 2015)

• The European Election (documentary film, 2015)

• School of Reis (screening series, 2016)

• The Cinema of Alessandro Rossetto (screening and masterclass series, 2016)

• Regiment Azov (documentary film, 2016)

• Shooting, Developing and Splicing Workshop (course, 2017)

• Hu Tai Li, the first Hong Kong Retrospective (screening and masterclass series, 2017)

• КОСМИЧЕСКИЙ КОММУНИСТ ИИСУС (screening series, 2017)

• Imagined Realities: Japanese Approaches to the Real (screening series, 2017)

• Chicken Blood (performance, 2017)

• The First Hong Kong Retrospective of Jean Rouch (screening series, 2018)

• Double Negative (performance, 2018)

• Sakura (short film, 2018)

• Gian Maria Volontè, the First Chinese Retrospective (screening series, 2019)

• Safe Migration (documentary series, 2019)

• Richard Williams: The First Hong Kong Retrospective (screening series, 2020)

• Thy Lane Re-Development: Phase I Pre-Sale Event (art performance, 2021)

• Dea (film, 2021)

• Soil (performance, 2021)

• The Sweetest Coup (performance, 2021)

• The Ghost of the Author (performance, 2021)

• Silvano Agosti, the first Hong Kong Retrospective (screening series, 2021)

• Bewitching Noise: Chinese Female Sound Artists (experimental music concerts, 2021)

• Michael Rogge: The Esoteric Retrospective (film screenings, 2021)

• Peter Delpeut: The First Hong Kong Retrospective (film screenings, 2021)

• KULA RING: Centenary Spring Cleansing and Potlach (art performance, 2022)

• Propaganda Film Festival (screening series, 2022)

• Holy Spring! (performance, 2022)

• Raimo D. Nagel: MY MOM DIED AND ALL I GOT WAS THIS STUPID SOLO SHOW (Art exhibition, 2022)

• Chicken Blood Hühnerblut (performance, 2022)

• Prometheus Double Unbound (performance, 2022)

• Uninvited Residency at Tehching Hsieh's House (performance, 2022)

• Alberto Gerosa Vomits A Hamburger (inside MoMA) (performance, 2022)

• Godard is Dead! Long Live Godard! Marathon Retrospective (film screenings, 2022)

• A Maggian Apparition (screenings and performance, 2022)

• Ouroboros (performance, 2023)

• At Ease! China 1981-84. Photographs by Andrea Cavazzuti

• 一 Yat, Italy-China Diptychs from 1981-83 by Andrea Cavazzuti (photography exhibition, 2023)

• Symbiotic Urbanism (Art exhibition, 2023)

• OVA: Japanese Domestic Dreams (screening series, 2023)

• The Complete Retrospective of Mori Masaki (screening series, 2023)

• ROBOTA: A.I. Humachine Ancestors (screening series, 2022)

• The Gritty Realm (Art exhibition, 2024)

• Outsider Basics (Art exhibition, 2024)

• Theatre Anthropology and Performance Studies (course, 2024)

• Water Margin (performance, 2024)

• Romeo Castellucci: the First Hong Kong Film Retrospective (screening series, masterclasses, 2025)
