= La prova d'amore =

- Directed by: Tiziano Longo
- Cinematography: Franco Delli Colli
- Release date: 1974
- Country: Italy
- Language: Italian

La prova d'amore is a 1974 Italian film. It stars actor Gabriele Ferzetti.

== Cast ==
- Ely Galleani as Angela
- Bruno Zanin as Gianni
- Stefano Amato
- Gabriele Ferzetti
- Françoise Prévost
- Jenny Tamburi
- Adriana Asti
