= The Mistress Is Served =

- Directed by: Mario Lanfranchi
- Written by: Mario Lanfranchi; Pupi Avati
- Starring: Senta Berger; Maurizio Arena; Bruno Zanin
- Cinematography: Pasquale Fanetti
- Edited by: Alessandro Lucidi
- Music by: Stelvio Cipriani
- Production company: InterVision
- Release date: 1976
- Running time: 105 minutes
- Countries: Italy; West Germany
- Language: Italian

The Mistress Is Served (Italian: La padrona è servita, German: Die Herrenreiterin) is a 1976 Italian-West German comedy drama film directed by Mario Lanfranchi and starring Senta Berger, Maurizio Arena, and Bruno Zanin.

It was shot at the RPA - Elios Studios in Rome and on location in Guastalla in Emilia-Romagna.

== Cast ==
- Senta Berger as Angela / mother
- Maurizio Arena as Domenico / Angela's second husband
- Bruno Zanin as Daniele / Domenico's son
- Erika Blanc as Olga / Angela's daughter
- Barbara Nascimben as Claudia / Angela's daughter
- Barbara Vittoria Calori as Sultana / Angela's daughter
- Pina Cei as Fanny / Countess -Angela's mother-in-law
- Angiolina Quinterno as Lina / maid
- Luigi Casalini
- Bruno Lanzarini
- Patricia Weber
- Renzo Bianconi
- Patrizia De Clara

== Bibliography ==
- Bock, Hans-Michael & Bergfelder, Tim. The Concise CineGraph. Encyclopedia of German Cinema. Berghahn Books, 2009.
