= Bruno Zanin =

Italian actor and writer (1951–2024)

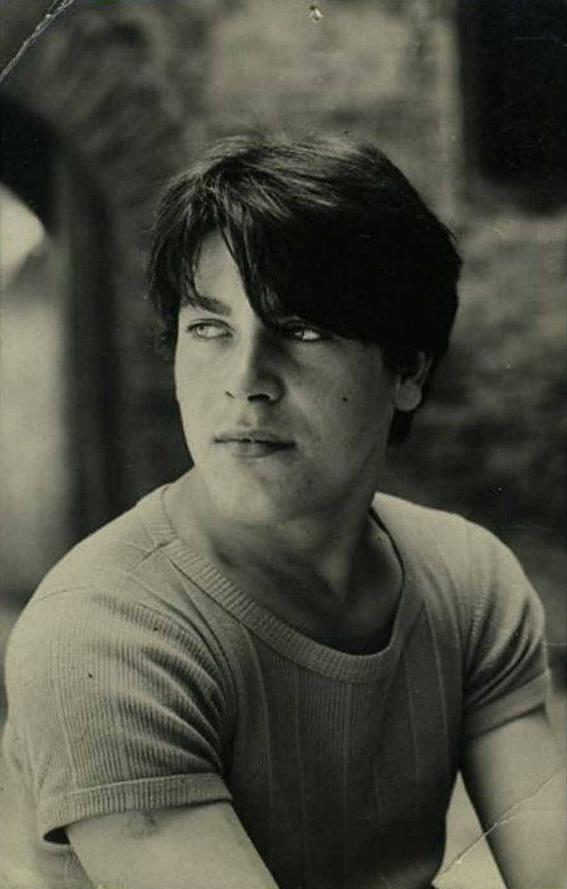
- Born: 9 April 1951; Vigonovo, Veneto, Italy
- Died: 7 July 2024 (aged 73); Domodossola, Piedmont, Italy
- Occupation(s): Actor, writer
- Years active: 1973–2024
- Spouse: Monique
- Children: Francesco; Fiorenzo

Bruno Zanin (9 April 1951 – 7 July 2024) was an Italian film, theatre, and television actor and writer.

== Life and career ==
Child of farmers and the sixth of seven brothers, Zanin studied at a school run by priests up to the age of fourteen, when an event occurred that made him leave (detailed in his novel, Nobody Must Know). After a life on the road, including time in jail, he became an actor by accident when Federico Fellini chose him among thousands of young men for the role of Titta in the film Amarcord. He went on to appear in numerous films, theatre plays and television series with Italian and foreign filmmakers such as Giuseppe Ferrara, Marco Tullio Giordana, Giuliano Montaldo, Franco Brusati, Luigi Faccini, Lucian Pintilie and Lina Wertmüller. In the theatre, he has worked with Giorgio Strehler, Luca Ronconi, Marco Sciaccaluga, Gianfranco De Bosio, Sandro Sequi, and Alfredo Arias, appearing chiefly in Venetian language plays by Goldoni but also in William Shakespeare's The Merchant of Venice.

In 2007, he published his first novel, an autobiographical work titled Nobody Must Know. The book obtained special mention at the Città di Latisana per il Nord Est, an Italian literary awards event. The novel was published in Spanish by Trotta editorial (Madrid) as Que no se entere nadie.

Zanin had two sons, Francesco and Fiorenzo. He lived in a log cabin in the woods at Vanzone con San Carlo, a mountain village below Monte Rosa, Piedmont.

Zanin died on 7 July 2024, at the age of 73.

== Filmography ==
Year	Title	Role	Director	Notes
1973	Amarcord	Titta	Federico Fellini	
1974	City Under Siege	Young Lover of Maria	Romolo Guerrieri	
1974	La prova d'amore	Gianni	Tiziano Longo	
1975	Killer Cop	Franco Ludovisi	Luciano Ercoli	
1975	The First Time on the Grass		Gianluigi Calderone	
1976	And Agnes Chose to Die	Figlio di Cencio	Giuliano Montaldo	
1976	The Mistress Is Served	Daniele Cardona, il figlio	Mario Lanfranchi	
1978	La borgata dei sogni		Daniele Pettinari	
1978	Mille e una vita		Gianfranco Mingozzi	
1982	Marco Polo	Giulio	Giuliano Montaldo	TV Mini-Series, 3 episodes
1982	The Good Soldier	Marco	Franco Brusati	
1983	Occhei, occhei		Claudia Fiorio	
1984	Notti e nebbie	Bonetti	Marco Tullio Giordana	TV movie
1985	Inganni		Luigi Faccini	
1986	The Moro Affair	2nd Brigadist	Giuseppe Ferrara	
1987	Treasure Island in Outer Space	Morgan	Antonio Margheriti	TV Mini-Series, 5 episodes
2000	Francesca e Nunziata	Beppe	Lina Wertmüller	TV movie
2000	La donna del delitto	Bruno D'Amato	Corrado Colombo	
2009	Reame del Nulla		Razi Mohebi	
2017	In Search of Fellini	Beppi	Taron Lexton	
2021	Dea	Bruno	Alberto Gerosa	

== TV theatre ==
- 1979: The Merchant of Venice, by William Shakespeare, dir. Gianfranco De Bosio with Sergio Fantoni, Andrea Giordana, Massimo Dapporto, Pino Ferrara, Lina Sastri, Bruno Zanin, Vittorio Stagni, Ilaria Occhini, Massimo Foschi, Gianrico Tedeschi, Antonio Garrani, Loris Loddi, (aired on 24 March 1979).

== Theatre ==
- 1974: Goldoni – La putta onorata and la buona moglie
- 1975: Goldoni – Il Campiello
- 1979: Shakespeare – Il Mercante di Venezia
- 1982: Goldoni – I pettegolezzi delle donne
- 1989: Goldoni – Il Ventaglio

== Writing ==
- 2006: Nobody must know (ed. Tullio Pironti)
