= Garden Hill (Hong Kong) =

Hill in Hong Kong

- 嘉頓山
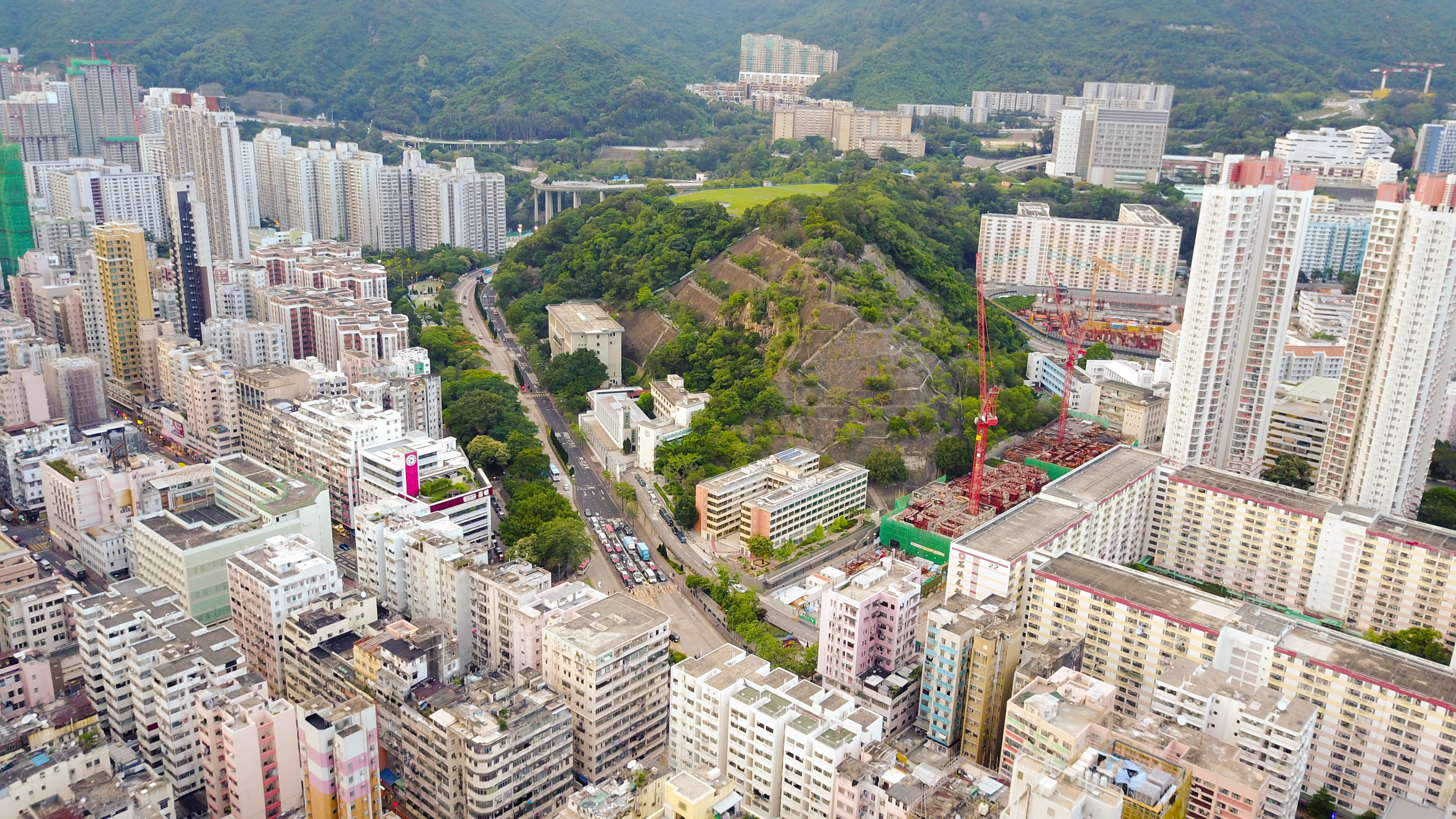
- View of Garden Hill

Highest point
- Elevation: 90 m (300 ft)
- Coordinates: 22°20′11.5″N 114°9′49.0″E

Geography
- Location within Hong Kong
- Location: Hong Kong

Garden Hill (Chinese: 喃嘸山; Cantonese Yale: nàahm mòuh shāan; or 嘉頓山; gā déun shāan) is a 300-foot-tall (91-metre) hill in the Sham Shui Po District in northwestern Kowloon, Hong Kong, near Un Chau, Om Yau and Pak Tin. Its summit is a popular place among photographers for its views of urban Hong Kong. One entrance to the trail leading to the summit can be found next to Grade II historic building Mei Ho House.

== Name ==
The hill's name comes from the nearby former headquarters of the Garden Company, known locally for its cookies and bakery products.

== See also ==
- Geography of Hong Kong
- List of mountains, peaks and hills in Hong Kong
- Sham Shui Po
- Shek Kip Mei
- Woh Chai Shan aka. Shek Kip Mei Hill aka. Bishop Hill, a nearby hill in Shek Kip Mei
