= Ex-Sham Shui Po Service Reservoir =

Reservoir in Sham Shui Po, Hong Kong

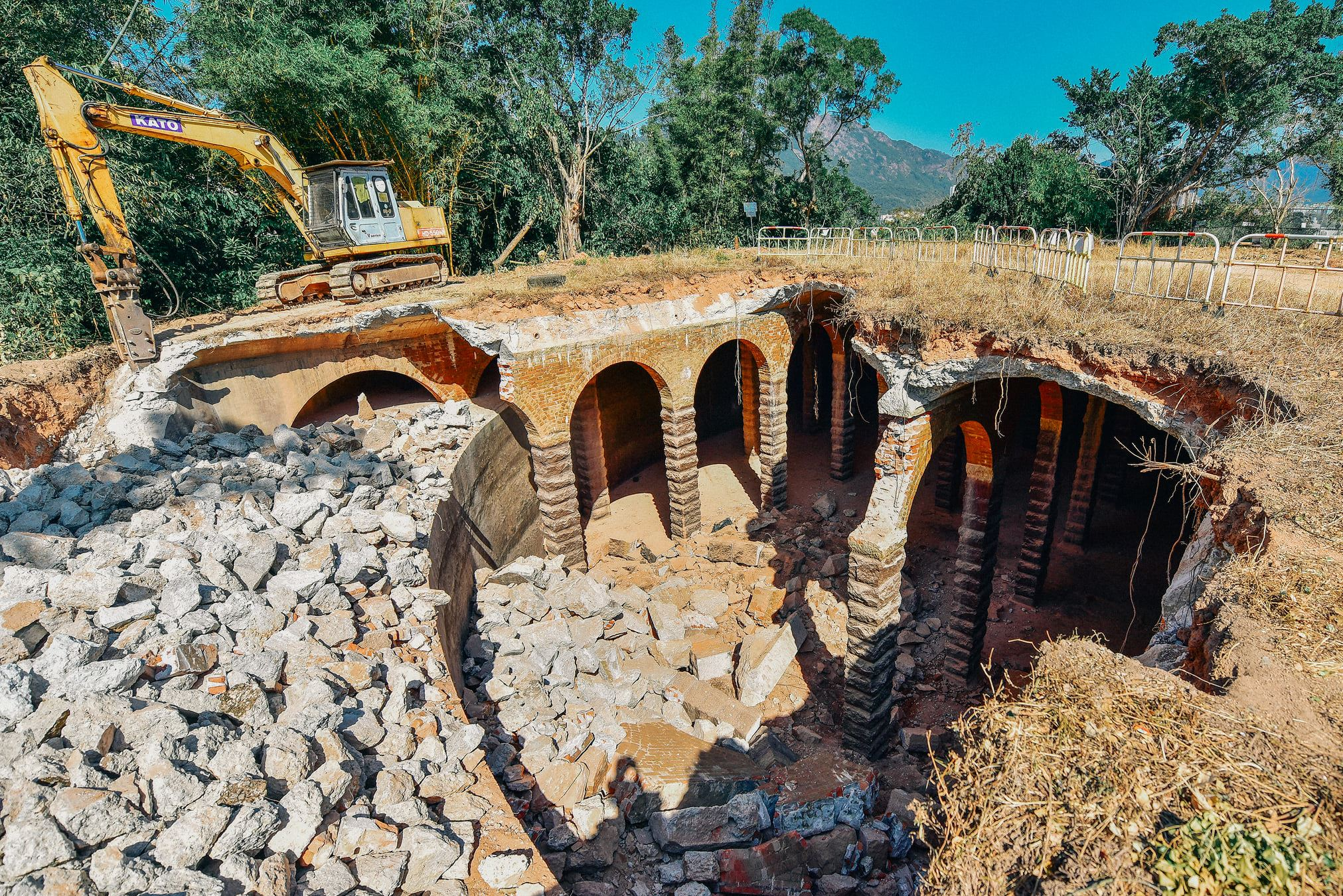
- Ex-Sham Shui Po Service Reservoir before its demolition was stopped

- Location within Hong Kong
- Location: Sham Shui Po, Hong Kong
- Coordinates: 22°19′46.2″N 114°10′04.0″E
- Built: 1904; 122 years ago

Ex-Sham Shui Po Service Reservoir
- Traditional Chinese: 前深水埗配水庫
Transcriptions

Ex-Sham Shui Po Service Reservoir is a service reservoir on Woh Chai Shan in Sham Shui Po, Hong Kong. The reservoir was completed in 1904 to service residents of Kowloon Tong, Sham Shui Po, and Tai Hang Tung. It was declared a Grade I historic building in 2021 by the Antiquities Advisory Board, a statutory board of Hong Kong.

== History ==
The Service Reservoir was completed on 10 August 1904 in the Romanesque architectural style, a building style which was thought to have arrived in Hong Kong from Britain who inherited it from ancient Rome. The reservoir terminated its service in 1970 when the larger Shek Kip Mei Fresh Water Service Reservoir, which had a larger storage, replaced its functions.

=== Halted demolition and conservation ===
In 2017, the Water Supplies Department (WSD) discovered cracks at the top of the underground reservoir and tree roots breached the dome of the reservoir, posing structural hazard to the entire establishment. After confirming the reservoir was no longer in use and receiving no objection from the Antiquities and Monuments Office (AMO), the WSD decided to demolish the Reservoir and redesignate the government land for general use by the Lands Department. The demolition work began in October 2020. By December 2020, the disused reservoir was revealed to contain brick arches and a cement roof of in the Romanesque architectural style.

On 28 December 2020, a concerned group of citizens noticed the imminent destruction of the reservoir. Determined to halt the demolition, some citizens approached the site and demanded the workers to stop the drilling, one even physically blocking the drilling machines from progressing. After much public outcry, the demolition was suspended the next day. In the aftermath, the Antiquities and Monuments Office defended criticisms that the board did not raise any objection to the WSD's plan in 2017 when the demolition was brought to its attention in a meeting, because the WSD described the reservoir as a disused "water tank". The WSD made no mention of its historic arches and cavernous architecture, and heritage officials thought it was "just a normal tank".

In June 2021, the Antiquities Advisory Board accorded the Service Reservoir with Grade I historical building status. The Government currently organises guided and virtual tours through the Water Supplies Department, and members of the public are able to visit the site with no reservation. It has since been revealed that two other century-old reservoirs — the Hatton Road Service Reservoir and the Magazine Gap Road Service Reservoir — were demolished in 2011 and 2010 respectively, with no objection from the AMO.

== Gallery ==
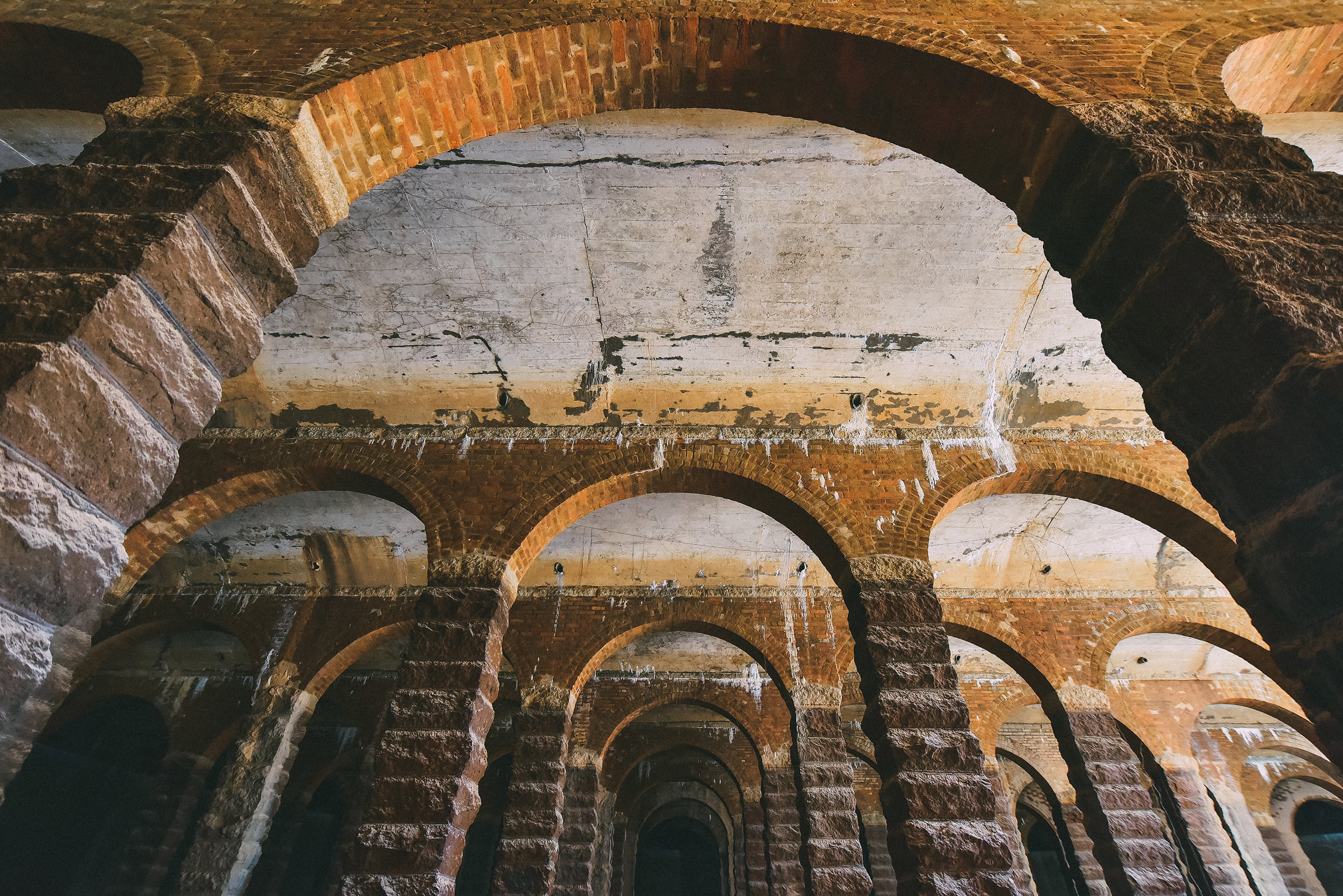
Brick arches

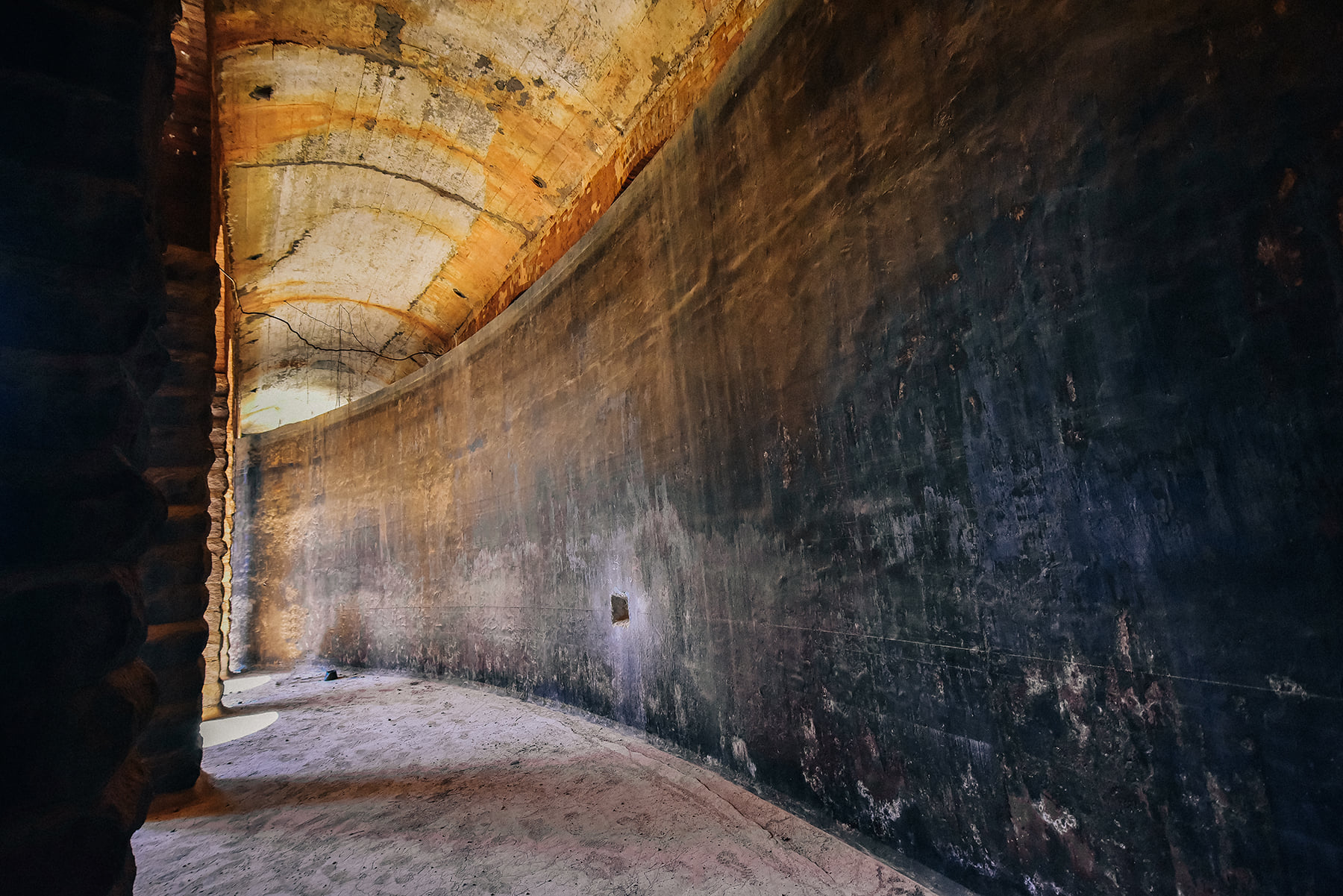
Concrete-reinforced wall

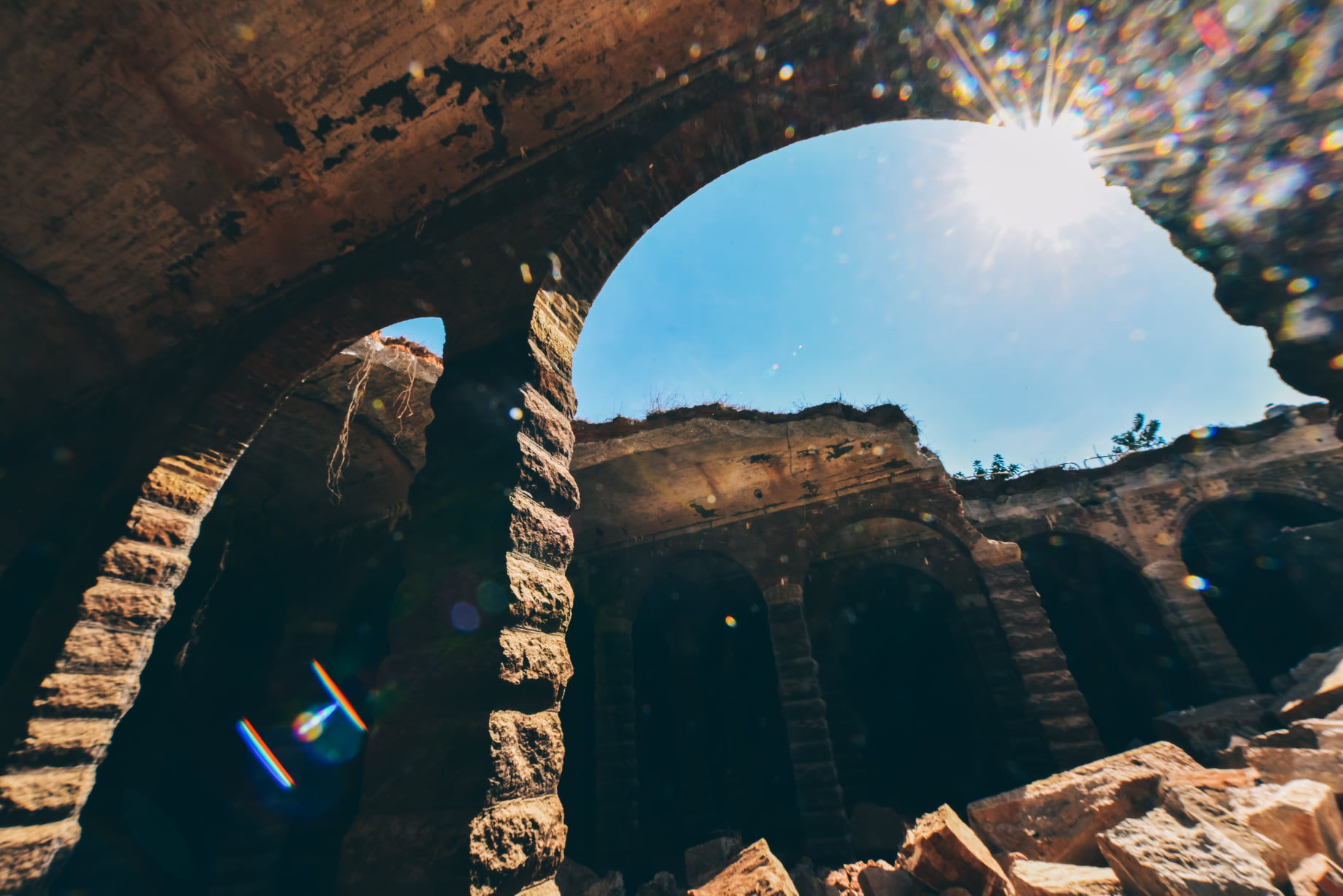
Roof-top arches destroyed by demolition

== See also ==
- List of reservoirs of Hong Kong
