= Woh Chai Shan =

Hill in Kowloon, Hong Kong

Coordinates: 22.329892°N 114.168794°E

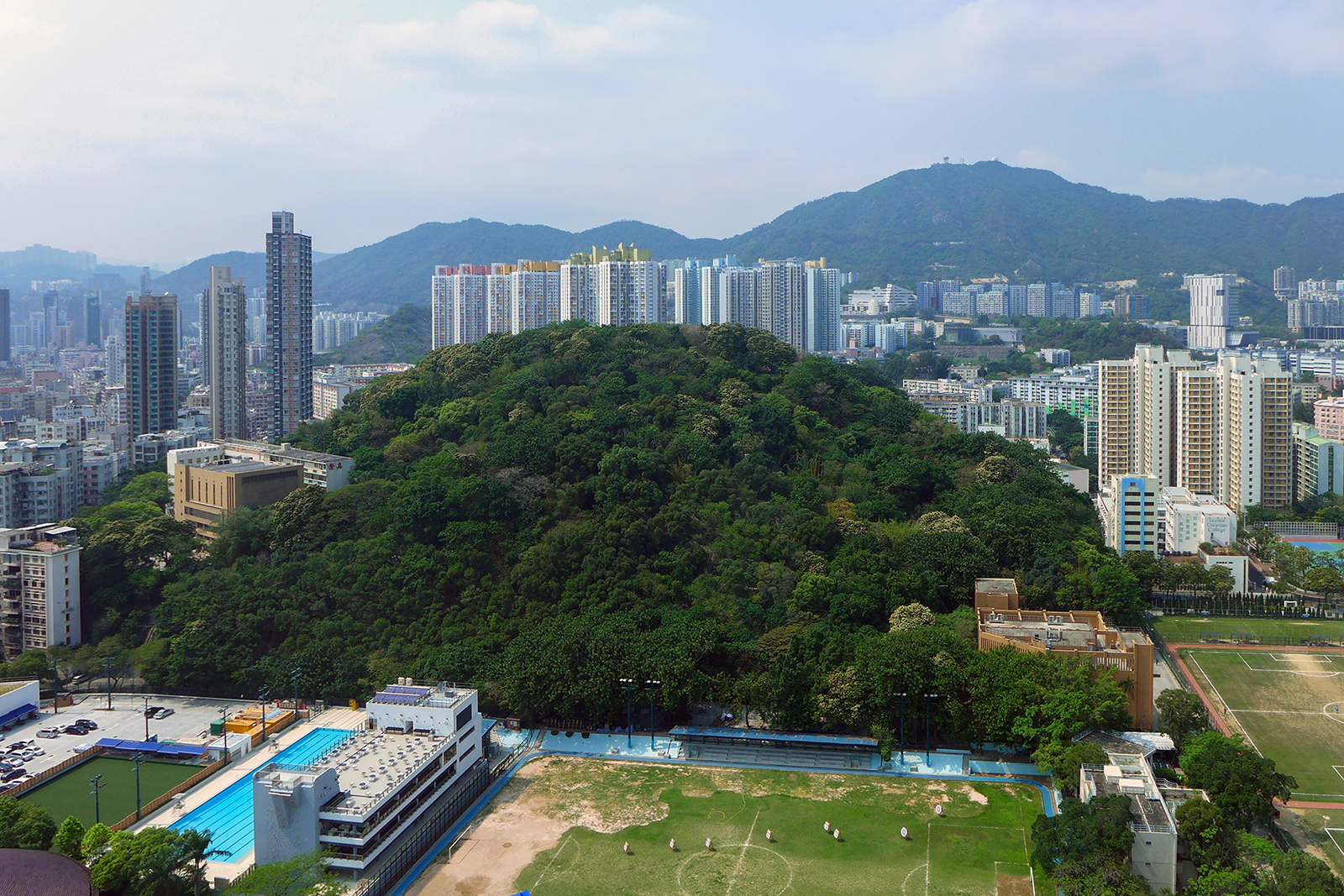
View of Woh Chai Shan in 2015.

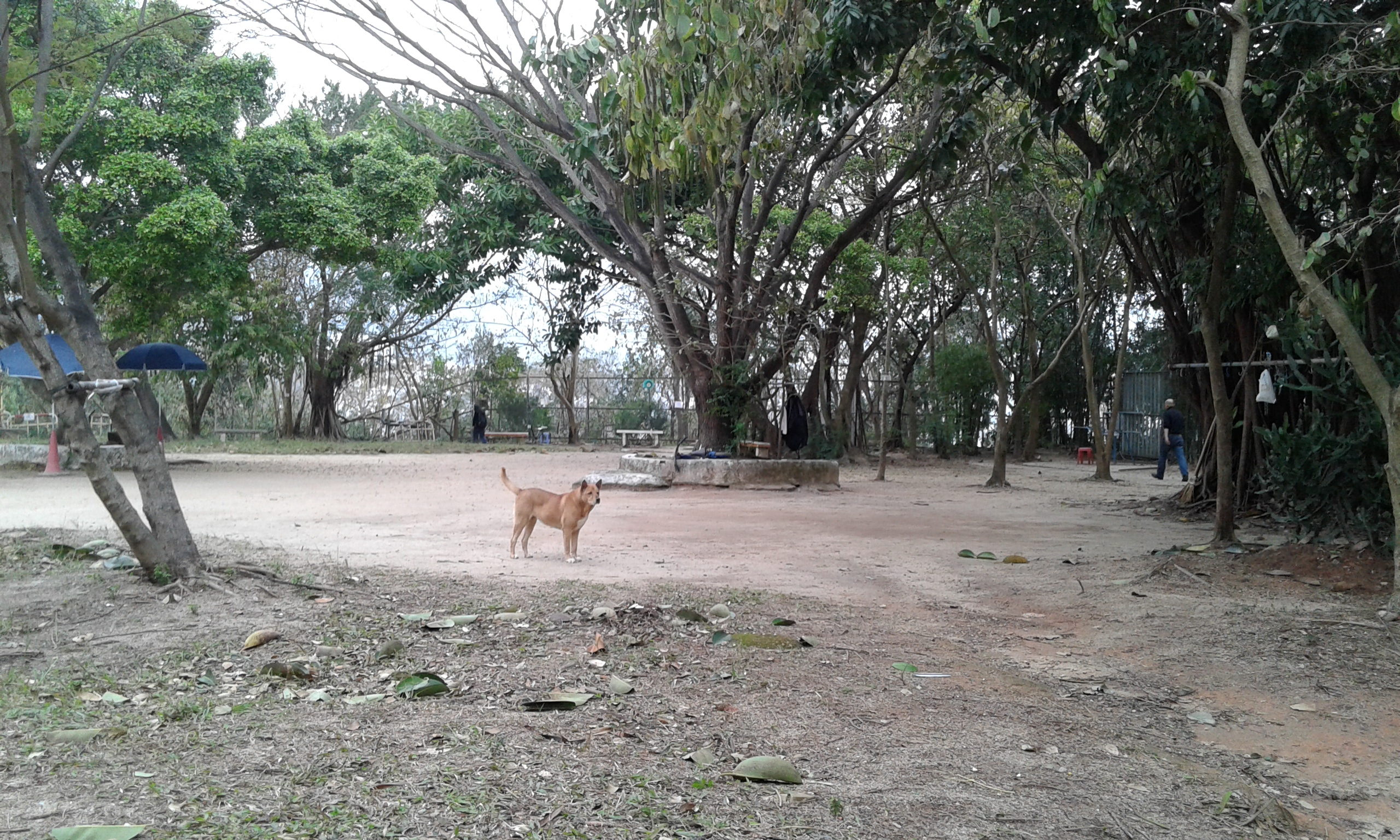
Open space at the top of the hill and above the service reservoir, in 2016.

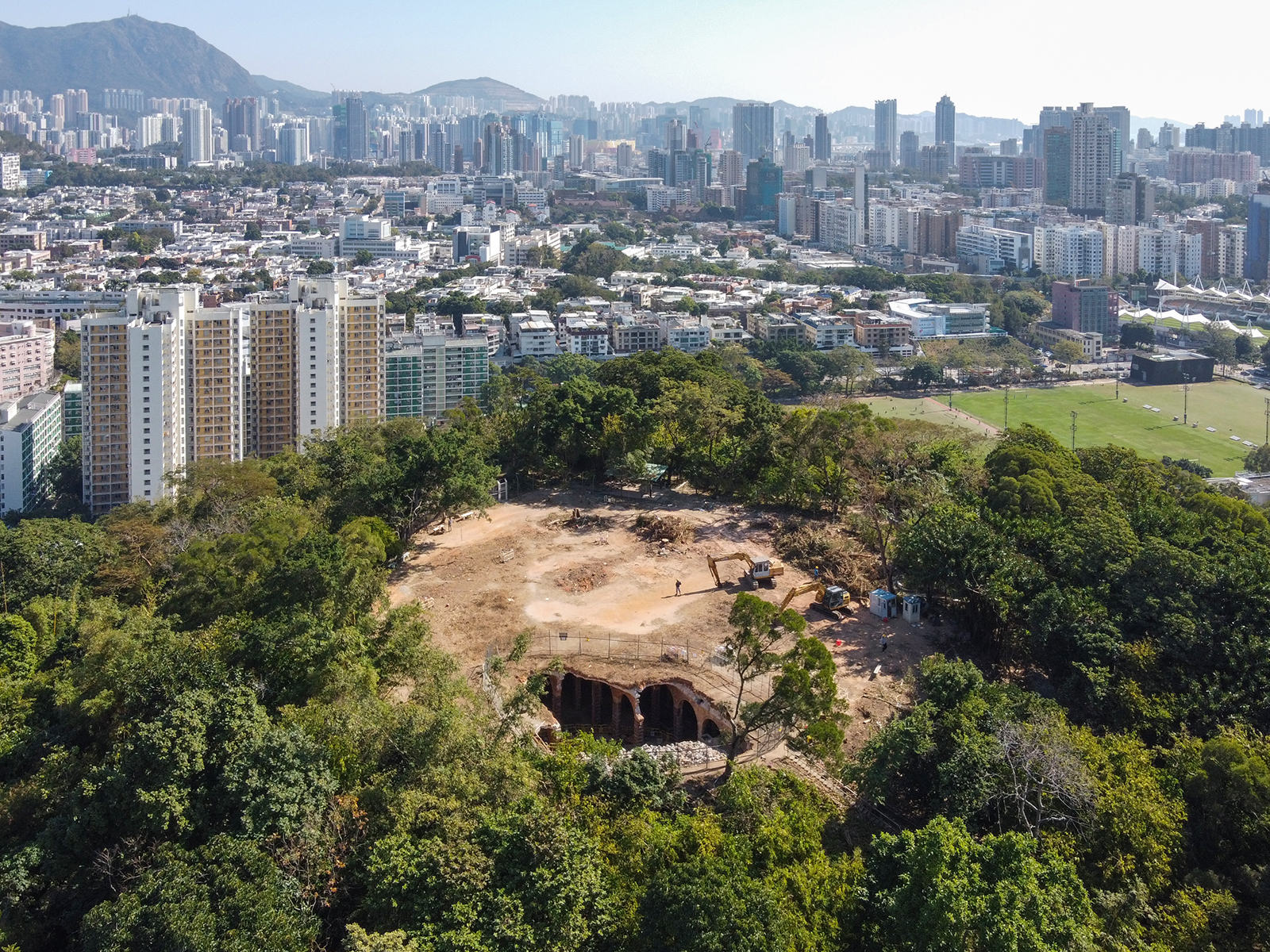
Woh Chai Shan in January 2021, with the excavated top of the ex-Sham Shui Po Service Reservoir visible.

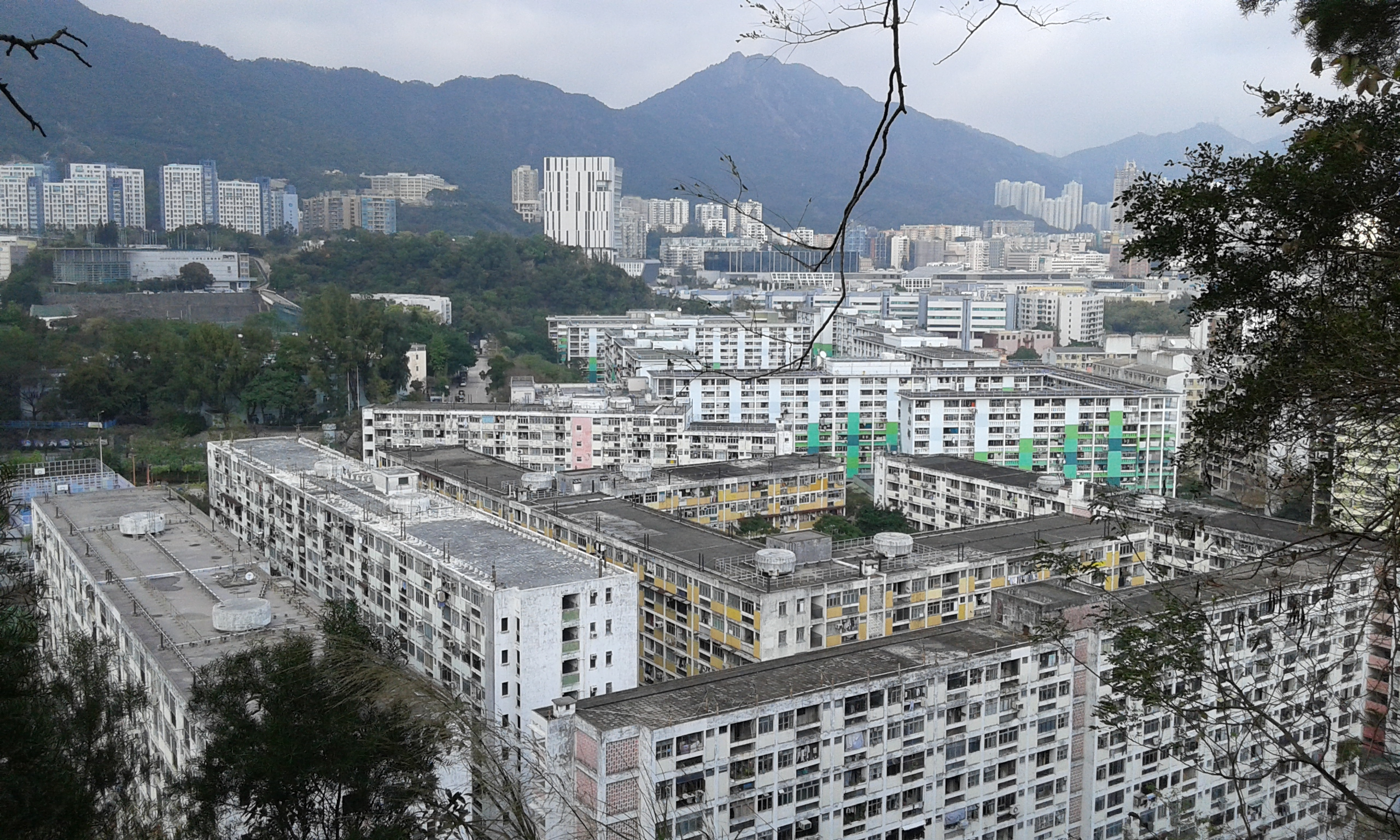
View from an open space near the top of Woh Chai Shan, looking north.

Woh Chai Shan (Chinese: 窩仔山), a.k.a. Shek Kip Mei Hill (石硤尾山), Mission Hill or Bishop Hill (主教山), is a hill in Shek Kip Mei, New Kowloon, Hong Kong. It is approximately 86 metres (282 feet) tall.

The hill is zoned as open space under Hong Kong's town planning system. It is mostly undeveloped and is used by some local residents for recreation and leisure. The Kwun Tong line of the Mass Transit Railway (MTR) runs beneath the hill.

== Service reservoir ==
The top of the hill is the site of a former service reservoir of the Water Supplies Department, officially known as Ex-Sham Shui Po Service Reservoir, previously known as the Sham Shui Po Fresh Water Break Pressure Tank, that was disused due to structural issues. Demolition of the covered (underground) reservoir began in December 2020, but was halted after the works revealed well-preserved Roman-style arches dating to 1904. The Antiquities and Monuments Office was summoned to assess the site. Heritage groups, lawmakers, district councillors, and members of the public have called for the structure's preservation. Comparisons have been made to Paddington Reservoir Gardens, in Sydney, a successful conversion of a similar historic reservoir to a public garden.

On 29 December 2020, the government announced that the reservoir would be preserved. Heritage commissioner Ivanhoe Chang apologised for the incident and pledged to "make sure that this will not happen again". Sham Shui Po district councillor Kalvin Ho blamed the Water Supplies Department for furnishing misleading and "very dark" photos to the council prior to the commencement of demolition.

On 5 January 2021, the Water Supplies Department began tidying the site and temporarily strengthening the structure in preparation for "future rehabilitation and conservation". On 10 June 2021, the Ex-Sham Shui Po Service Reservoir was listed as a Grade I historic building.

== See also ==
- Garden Hill, a nearby hill in Sham Shui Po District sometimes also called "Shek Kip Mei Hill"
