= The Shouty Track =

Single by Lemon Jelly

from the album '64–'95
- Released: 24 January 2005
- Genre: Big beat, electronic rock
- Length: 3:41
- Label: XL Recordings
- Producer(s): Nick Franglen

Lemon Jelly singles chronology
"Stay With You" (2004)	"The Shouty Track" (2005)	"Make Things Right" (2005)

Professional ratings
Review scores
Source	Rating
Drowned In Sound	4/10 stars

"The Shouty Track" is a single by English electronic music duo Lemon Jelly, taken from their second album '64–'95.

It samples the track "Horrorshow" by post-punk/new wave band Scars. As with the other tracks on '64–'95, "The Shouty Track" differs from their previous albums, Lemonjelly.KY and Lost Horizons, displaying a heavier, darker sound.

"The Shouty Track" spent 2 weeks on the UK Singles Chart, peaking at number 21 in February 2005.

== Track listing ==
=== CD1 ===
1. "The Shouty Track"
2. "Nice Weather for Ducks (unplugged)"

=== CD2 ===
1. "The Shouty Track"
2. "Baby Battle Scratch"
3. "The Shouty Track" video

== Music video ==
The animated video for "The Shouty Track", produced by Airside, consists of two cartoon-like characters being drawn by an unseen hand, who then begin to head-bang to the beat of the music. Other elements include rapid montages of images related to the headbangers' lives such as barbecue and getting tattoos, but foremost, gratuitous violence – notably both the perpetrators and victims remain mostly unfazed by the punches exchanged.

The video is included on the DVD release of '64–'95, along with animated videos for the other tracks.
