= King Tai Court =

Housing estate in San Po Kong, Hong Kong

- Chinese: 景泰苑
Transcriptions
Standard Mandarin
- Hanyu Pinyin: Jǐngtài Yuàn
Yue: Cantonese
- Jyutping: ging2 taai3 jyun2

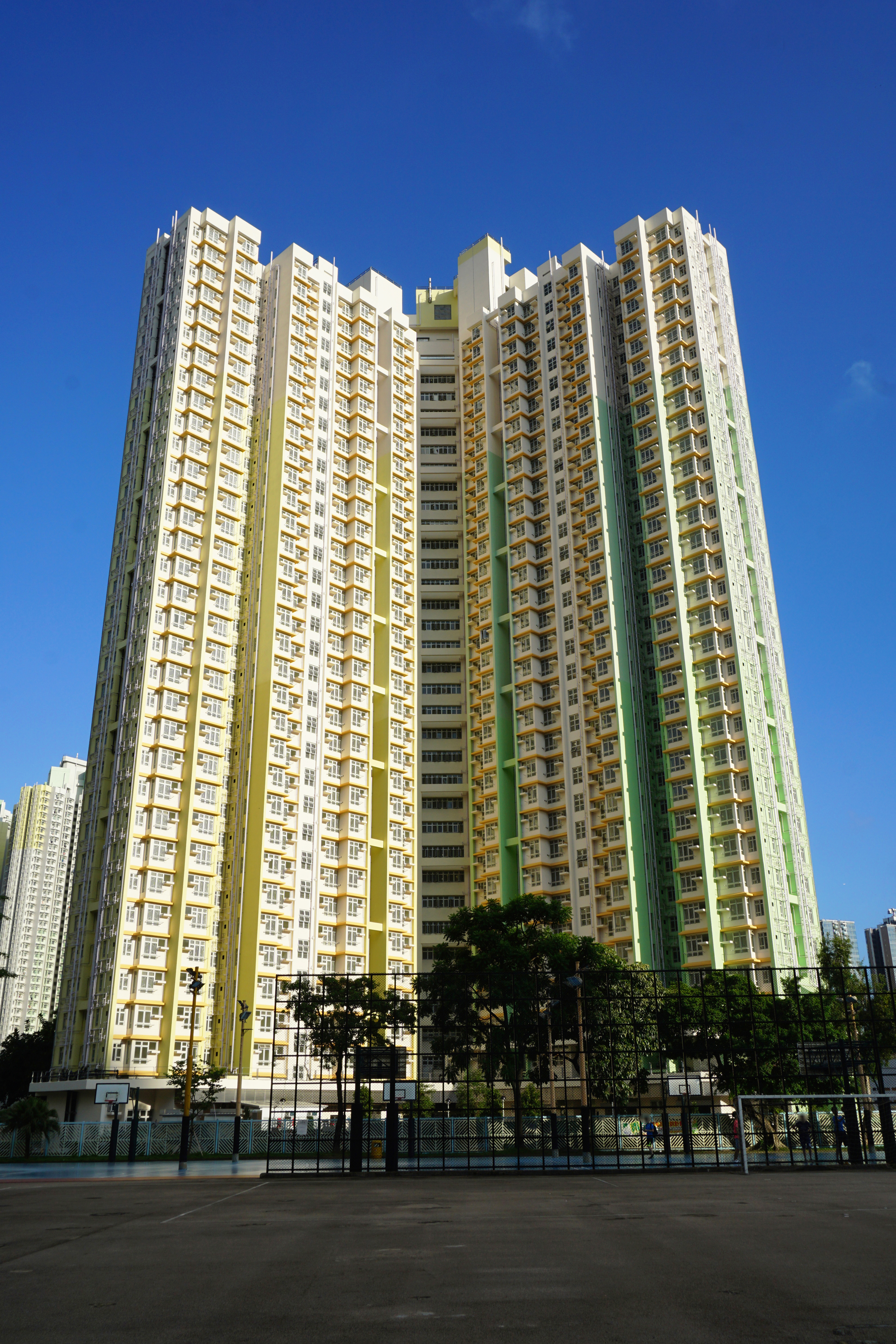
King Tai Court

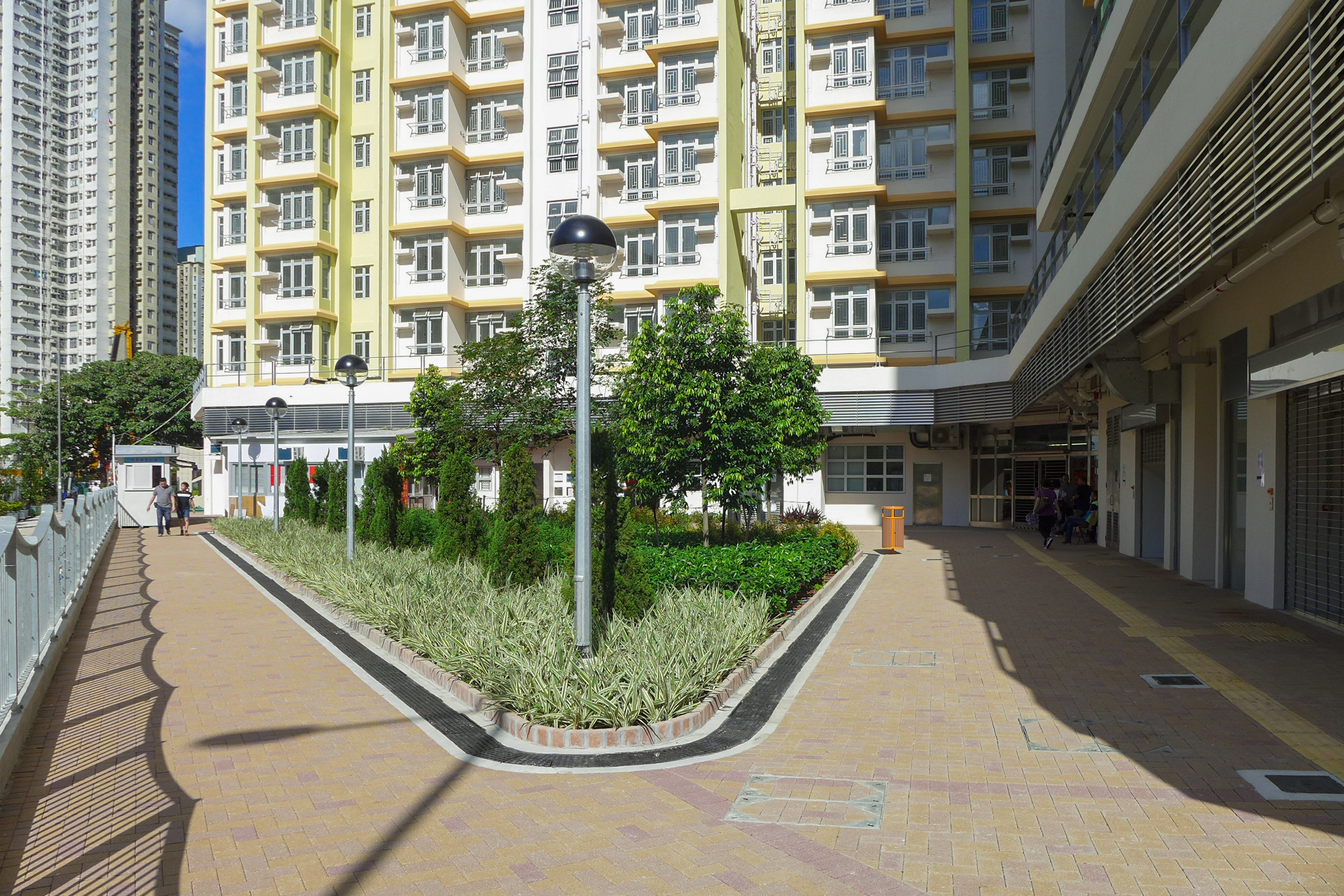
Garden at entrance

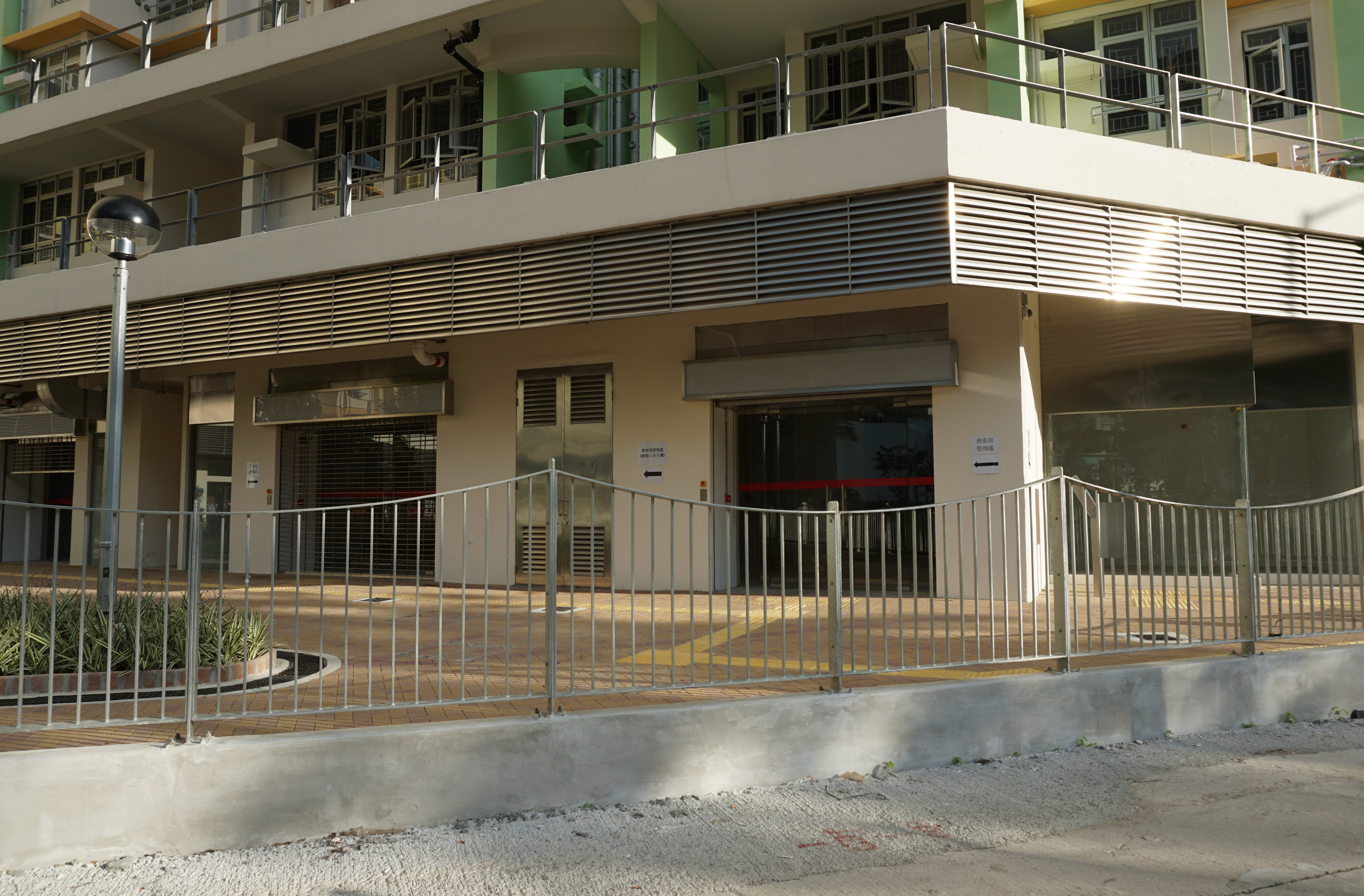
Shops

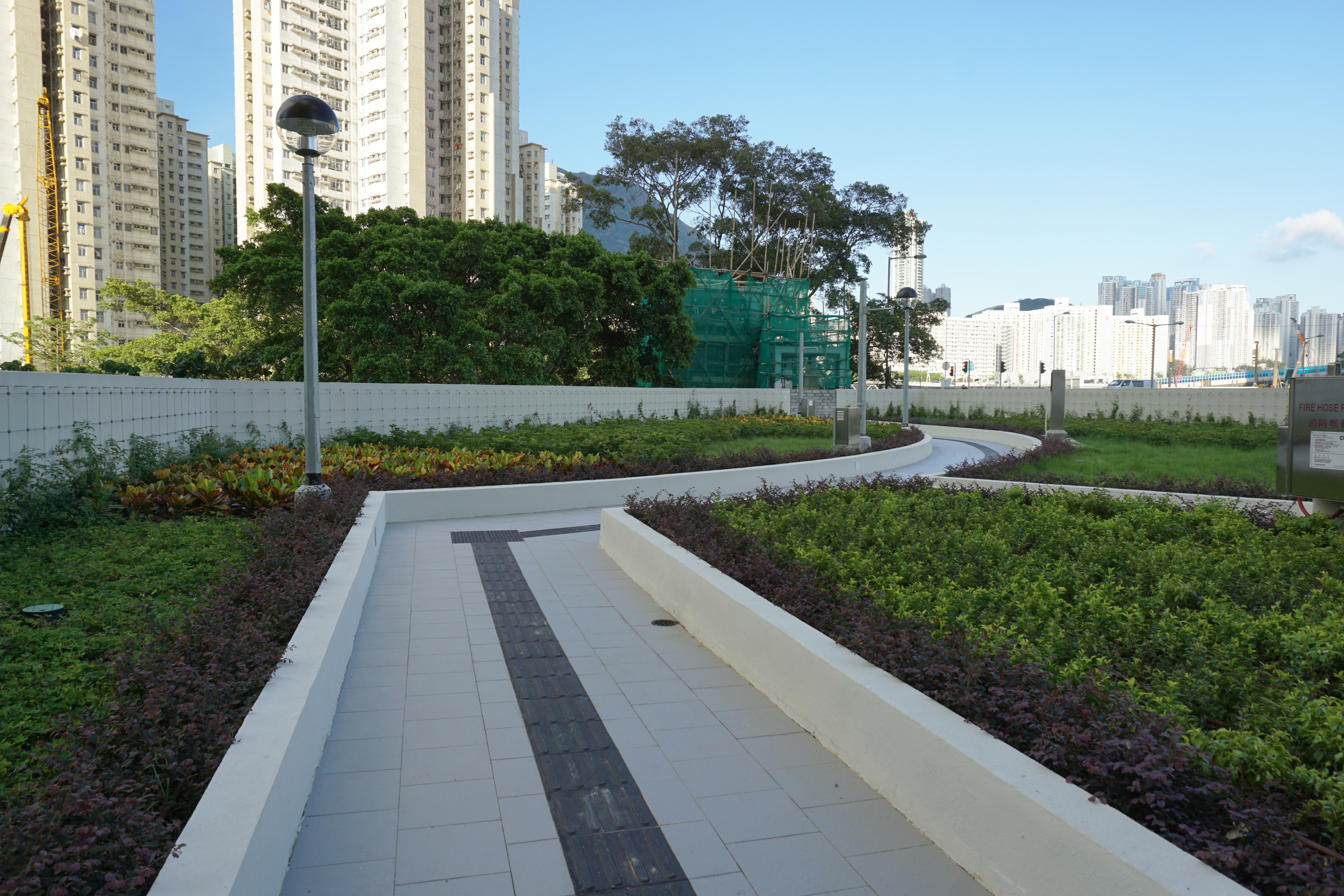
Platform garden at the first floor

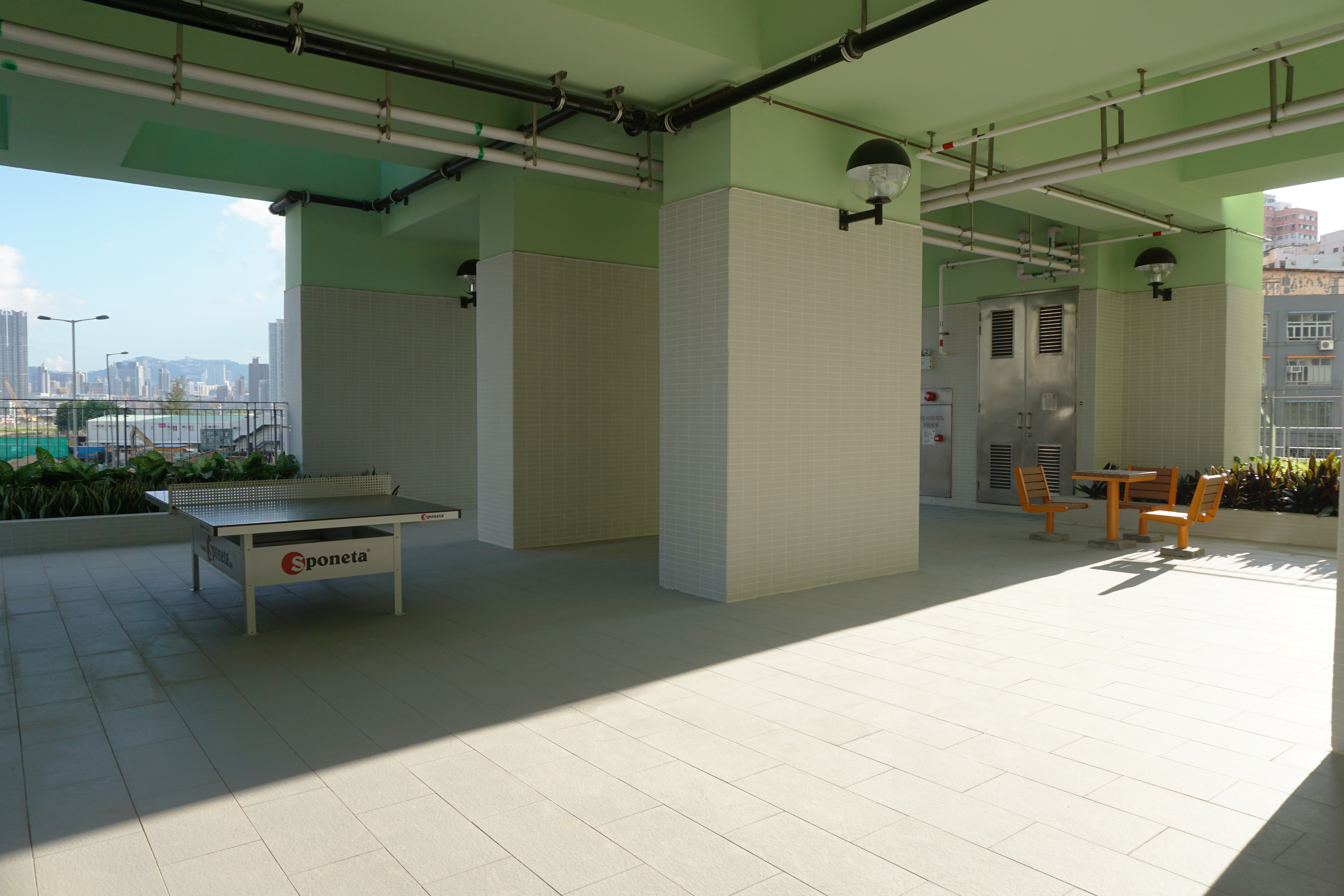
Table tennis table and chess area at the first floor

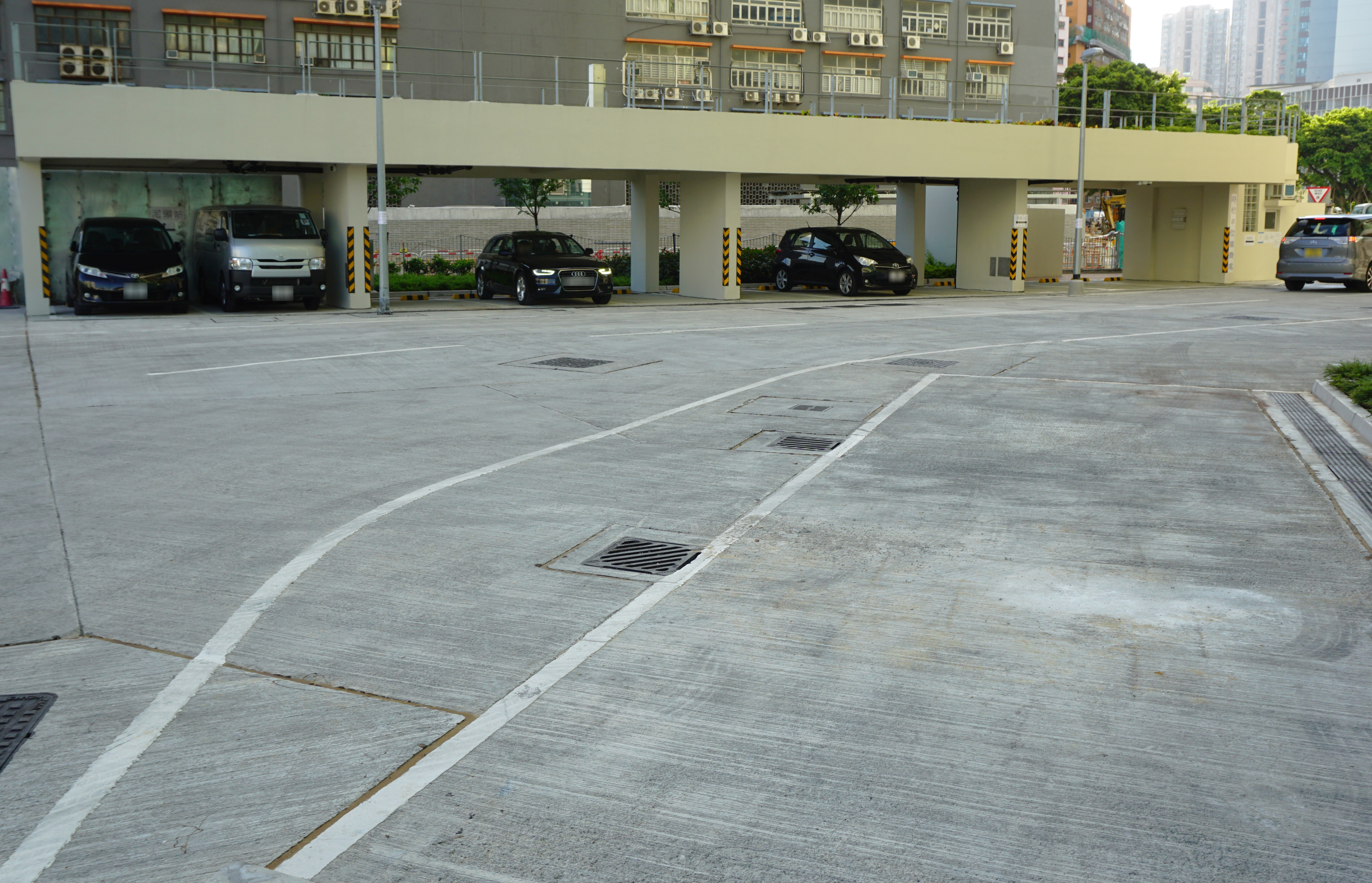
Car park

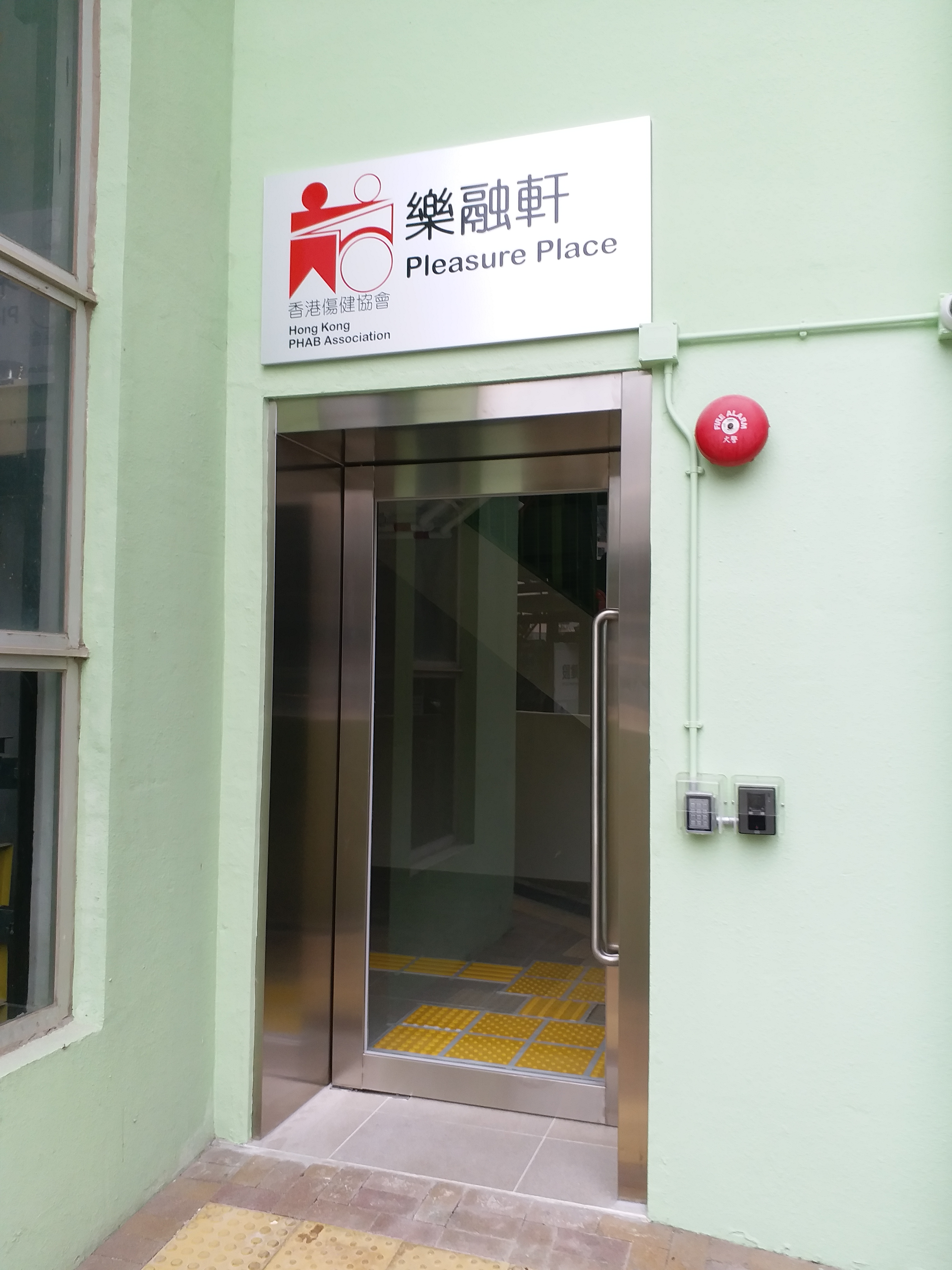
Pleasure Place

King Tai Court (Chinese: 景泰苑) is the first Green Form Subsidised Home Ownership Scheme court developed by the Hong Kong Housing Authority and located at King Fuk Street, San Po Kong of Wong Tai Sin District, Kowloon, Hong Kong. It commenced in June 2017.

Formerly the site of demolished San Po Kong Factory Estate and originally planned as a public housing estate, the court occupies a site of around 6,800 square metres (73,000 sq ft) and comprises one domestic tower block, providing 857 residential flats in 32 domestic storeys of saleable floor area from 192 to 494 square feet (17.8 to 45.9 m^{2}). Since it is built along the busy Prince Edward Road East, fixed windows are installed in flats facing the road side to block the roadway noise as far as possible. Other amenities include retail, ancillary parking space, recreational facilities, property management office, and supported hostel for physically disabled (Pleasure Place).

The flats were sold out in May 2017 to sitting tenants of Public Rental Housing and applicants eligible for Public Rental Housing at a starting price of HK$940,200 (equivalent to about US$158,461 in 2025).

== Education ==
King Tai Court is in Primary One Admission (POA) School Net 43. Within the school net are multiple aided schools (operated independently but funded with government money) and Wong Tai Sin Government Primary School.

== Nearby buildings ==
- Diamond Hill station
- Kai Tak station
- Rhythm Garden
- Choi Hung Estate
- The Latitude
- Kai Ching Estate
- SOGO
- AIRSIDE
