= Airside (disambiguation) =

Airside is a controlled part of an airport.

Airside may also refer to:

- Airside (company), a defunct design studio in London
- Airside (building), a skyscraper in Hong Kong
- Airside, a 2023 novel by Christopher Priest
- Airside, a 2022 novel by James Swallow
