= Blacksand =

UK musical group

Blacksand is a British guitar-based electronic music duo consisting of Nick Franglen of Lemon Jelly and C.J. Casey of Akasha.

They are noted for the unusual places in which they play their improvised music, which include down a mine, on a submarine and in an abandoned industrial testing facility. They released their first album, Barn, in May 2008.
