= Ramblin' Man =

Ramblin' Man or Rambling Man may refer to:

== TV ==
- Ramblin' Man, reissue title of TV movie Concrete Cowboys

== Music ==
- The Ramblin' Man, a 1974 album by Waylon Jennings
- Ramblin' Man, a 1992 compilation by The Allman Brothers Band
- Ramblin' Man, a 2014 album by Hank Williams III
- Ramblin' Man (Campbell and Lanegan album), a 2005 EP by Isobel Campbell and Mark Lanegan

=== Songs ===
- "Ramblin' Man" (Hank Williams song), a 1951 song later covered by grandson Hank Williams III and The Melvins in 1999
- "Ramblin' Man" (The Allman Brothers Band song), 1973
- "Ramblin' Man", a song from Lemon Jelly's 2002 album Lost Horizons
- "Rambling Man", a song by Laura Marling from album I Speak Because I Can
- "Ramblin' Man/Theme from Ramblin' Man", a song from Steve Martin album, Let's Get Small

== See also ==
- "I'm a Ramblin' Man", a 1967 song by Ray Pennington also covered by Waylon Jennings
- "Ramblin' Gamblin' Man" a 1968 song by Bob Seger System
