= Scars (band) =

Scottish post-punk band from Edinburgh

- Origin: Edinburgh, Scotland
- Genres: Post-punk
- Years active: 1977–1982; 2010–2011
- Labels: Fast Product; Pre Records; Charisma Records; Stiff America
- Members: Robert King; Paul Research; John Mackie; Calumn Mackay; Steve McLaughlin
- Website: The Scars' website

Scars (originally known as The Scars) were a Scottish post-punk band from Edinburgh, Scotland, and were a part of that city's music scene of the late 1970s and early 1980s.

== History ==
The original Scars lineup performing live at the Meadows Festival in 1979, featuring original drummer Calumn Mackay

Fronted by Robert King and featuring Paul Research on lead guitar, John Mackie on bass, and Calumn Mackay on drums, the band's first single was in 1979 on Fast Product; "Horrorshow"/"Adult/ery". The band's song "Your Attention Please" appeared as a free gold flexi-disc in the first issue of the London-based style magazine i-D. This song was later included in the band's 1981 (and sole) album Author! Author!. The Scotsman ranked the album number 75 in the list of the top 100 Scottish rock and pop albums of all time. John Peel invited the band to record two of his Sessions, once in February 1980 and another in May 1981.

The group was part of a literary art-punk scene that centred on a pub called the "Tap o' Lauriston" at 80 Lauriston Place, Edinburgh (near Edinburgh College of Art), along with The Fire Engines and The Cubs.

In 1982, Scars supported The Church.

== Post break-up ==
Lemon Jelly used samples of "Horrorshow" in their song "'79 aka The Shouty Track" on the album '64–'95 in 2005. The song was the second single released from that album. When Lemon Jelly toured in support of '64–'95, they invited Scars (with original drummer Calumn Mackay) along to play live the sampled parts of "79 – The Shouty Track" in selected dates, including Edinburgh.

Scars appeared on BBC2's TOTP2 on 3 March 2007, which aired a live version of "All About You" from a 1981 episode of The Old Grey Whistle Test that featured Scars as special guests. Scars played a one-off reunion gig in Edinburgh on 29 December 2010, their first live appearance in 25 years.

The history of Scars is covered in 2015 documentary film, Big Gold Dream.

== Discography ==
- "Horrorshow"/"Adult/ery" (7", Fast 1979)
- "They Came and Took Her"/"Romance By Mail" (7", Charisma 1980)
- "Love Song"/"Psychomodo" (7", Charisma 1980)
- "All About You"/"Author! Author!" (7", Charisma 1981)
- Author! Author! (LP, Charisma 1981), charted at #67 UK.
- Author! Author! (EP, Stiff 1981)
- Author! Author! (CD, PreVS 2007)
