= Nice Weather for Ducks =

Single by Lemon Jelly

from the album Lost Horizons
- B-side: "Soft"
- Released: 20 January 2003
- Genre: Electronic
- Length: 5:52
- Songwriters: Fred Deakin; Nick Franglen

Lemon Jelly singles chronology
"Space Walk" (2002)	"Nice Weather for Ducks" (2003)	"Rolled"/"Oats" (2003)

"Nice Weather for Ducks" is a song recorded by British electronic band Lemon Jelly, released on 20 January 2003 from their second studio album Lost Horizons (2002).

The song spent three weeks on the UK chart, peaking at number 16. The track is primarily built around a sample of John Langstaff's "All the Ducks", which is an English translation of the traditional Dutch children's song "Alle Eendjes Zwemmen in het Water". Lemon Jelly were unable to clear the rights for the use of Langstaff's voice and instead the vocals are performed by Scottish actor Enn Reitel.

== Track listing ==
No.	Title	Length
1.	"Nice Weather for Ducks"	5:52
2.	"Soft"

Track 2 is from the Soft/Rock single, and contains elements of "If You Leave Me Now" by Chicago.
