= The Midnight (EP) =

EP by Lemon Jelly
- Released: 17 July 2000
- Genre: Electronica
- Length: 25:02
- Label: Impotent Fury

Lemon Jelly chronology
The Yellow (1999)	The Midnight (2000)	Lemonjelly.ky (2000)

The Midnight is the third EP released by electronica duo Lemon Jelly, according to the insert of Lemonjelly.ky, on 17 July 2000. It was limited to 1,000 10-inch (25-centimetre) copies, the first 200 of which featured hand screen-printed sleeves. The tracks from the EP were later incorporated for more accessible listening into the critically acclaimed Lemonjelly.ky album. The cover had silver foil stamped on the inner sleeve and die-cut holes in the outer sleeve so when the record was pulled out of its sleeve, the stars twinkled in the night sky.

== History ==
From 1998 to 2000, Franglen and Deakin released three limited-circulation EPs (The Bath (1998), The Yellow (1999), and The Midnight (2000)) on their very own label, Impotent Fury. The EPs were a critical success, and led to the duo being signed to XL Recordings.

== Track listing ==
Unless otherwise indicated, Information is based on the Album’s Liner Notes

The Midnight track listing
No.	Title	Writer(s)	Length
1.	"Kneel Before Your God"	Fred Deakin, Nick Franglen	7:20
2.	"Page One"	Deakin, Franglen	9:12
3.	"Come"	Deakin, Franglen, Lani Hall	8:30
Total length:			25:02

== Personnel ==
Information is based on the Album’s Liner Notes

- Nick Franglen - band member, production
- Fred Deakin - band member, design, illustration, art direction
- Steve "Barney" Chase - audio mixing
- John Hallam - vocals on "Page One"
- John Paul Jones - guitar, mandolin on "Come"
