= Stay with You (Lemon Jelly song) =

Single by Lemon Jelly

from the album '64–'95
- Released: 22 November 2004
- Genre: Electronic
- Length: 6:10
- Label: Impotent Fury
- Producers: Nick Franglen; Fred Deakin

Lemon Jelly singles chronology
"Rolled"/"Oats" (2003)	"Stay with You" (2004)	"The Shouty Track" (2005)

"Stay with You" is a single by English electronic music duo Lemon Jelly. It samples "I Wanna Stay with You" by Gallagher and Lyle. It charted at number 31 on the UK Singles Chart in December 2004.

== Track listings ==
=== CD: Impotent Fury / IFXLS 201 CD United Kingdom ===
No.	Title	Length
1.	"Stay With You"	3:14
2.	"Rolled"	5:37
3.	"The Fruity Track"	4:33

- Also released on 10" (IFXLT 201)

=== DVD: Impotent Fury / IFXLS 201 DVD United Kingdom ===
No.	Title	Length
1.	"Stay With You (Video)"	3:14
2.	"Ramblin' Band (Mercury Prize acceptance video)"	2:32
