= Author! Author! =

Author! Author! may refer to:

== Literature ==
- Author! Author! (book), autobiographical work by P. G. Wodehouse first published in 1953
- Author! Author! (short story), 1943 short story by Isaac Asimov
- Author, Author (novel), 2004 novel by David Lodge

== Television ==
- "Author, Author", series episode of Frasier (season 1)
- Author, Author (Star Trek: Voyager), series episode

== Other fields ==
- Author! Author! (album), 1981 album by the Scottish post-punk band Scars
- Author! Author! (film), 1982 film starring Al Pacino
