= Lost Horizons (Lemon Jelly album) =

Studio album by Lemon Jelly
- Released: October 2002
- Recorded: 2001–2002
- Genres: Electronica, downtempo, trip hop
- Length: 59:44
- Label: XL
- Producer: Nick Franglen

Lemon Jelly chronology
Lemonjelly.ky (2000)	Lost Horizons (2002)	'64–'95 (2005)

Singles from Lost Horizons
- 1. "Space Walk" Released: 7 October 2002; 2. "Nice Weather for Ducks" Released: 20 January 2003

Lost Horizons is the second studio album from the British electronic duo Lemon Jelly, released in October 2002. Released by XL Recordings and produced by Nick Franglen, the album generated two charting singles in the UK, "Space Walk" and "Nice Weather for Ducks"; the latter has often been called the album's stand-out track. The album, which is built around a mix of organic instrumentation and idiosyncratic samples, was met with largely positive reviews by music critics, although it was somewhat criticised due to its near-constant mellowness.

In the United Kingdom, Lost Horizons peaked at number 20 on the Official Albums Chart, whereas in the United States, it peaked at number 24 on Billboard's Top Electronic Albums component chart. The album's two singles, "Space Walk" and "Nice Weather for Ducks", were also successful, peaking on the UK Singles Chart, at number 36 and 16 respectively. The album was nominated for the Mercury Music Prize and Brit Award in 2003, and was eventually certified gold by the British Phonographic Industry for shipments exceeding 100,000 copies.

== Music ==
Lost Horizons opens with "Elements", which "blends acoustic guitars, flugelhorns, synths, skittering breakbeat rhythms, a folksy harmonica, and ... a falsetto 'doo-doo' chorus". Overlaying the music is a voiceover, courtesy of English actor John Standing, that lists the basic "elements" that make up the world: earth, metal, water, wood, fire, and (eventually, later in the song) sky. The second track, "Space Walk", is set to a recording of Ed White's 1965 space walk on the Gemini 4 mission. Franglen and Deakin chose to use the sample after listening to an album called Flight to the Moon (1969); the two were struck by how moving and emotive many of the tracks were. Deakin later said: "'One small step' leaves me cold, because it was so obviously scripted. But the spacewalk… even after hearing it so many times, it's so vivid."

"Ramblin' Man" features a conversation between an interviewer (the voice of Michael Deakin—uncle of Lemon Jelly's Fred Deakin) and "John the Ramblin' Man" (the voice of Standing), during which he lists various places from around the world, ranging "from small Sussex villages to major world capitals." When listed in the order in which the locations are narrated, the message "Bagpuss Sees All Things" is spelled out midway through the song (from Brixton at four minutes ten seconds, to San José at four minutes 31 seconds) using the first letter of each location. The band had initially intended to use a sample of Errol Flynn talking about his travels, but since it only included four destinations they compiled a list of 200 places and recorded Standing reading them.

The fourth track, "Return to Patagonia", features several jazz-inspired elements. It also samples the opening lines to the 1974 film Swallows and Amazons The song "Nice Weather for Ducks" is built around a sample inspired by John Langstaff's song "All the Ducks". This song was based on the popular Dutch children's song, "Alle eendjes zwemmen in het water" (translated: "All the ducklings are swimming in the water"). Franglen later said that he and Deakin were drawn to Langstaff's recording because it "had a gentle madness to it, slightly unhinged". The duo had attempted to clear Langstaff's version for sampling, but were unable to. In the end, they had Enn Reitel re-record the vocal snippet. Franglen, while noting that Reitel's performance was good, said that once the sample was re-recorded, its "edge disappeared". "Experiment Number 6", arguably the album's darkest track, features a fictional field recording of a doctor documenting the side effects of an unnamed drug administered to a patient; the recording tells how the patient progresses from normalcy, to an "overwhelming sense of well-being and euphoria", before eventually dying. The album closes with "The Curse of Ka'Zar", which features "a two-part harmony chorus and jazzy drum loop".

== Artwork ==
The artwork for Lost Horizons was created by bandmember Fred Deakin and his London-based graphic design company Airside. The sleeve features a three-dimensional landscape of a city and countryside: The cover features the landscape during the day, which depicts the countryside as vibrant and the city as dull and grey. Conversely, the interior of the sleeve features the same landscape at nighttime; in this piece, the countryside is dark and the city is illuminated. The cover used a 3D model landscape constructed by Airside member Sam Burford, which Deakin then rendered into a computer-generated image.

== Reception ==
=== Critical reviews ===
Professional ratings
Aggregate scores
Source	Rating
Metacritic	81/100
Review scores
Source	Rating
AllMusic	4/5 stars
Blender	3/5 stars
Entertainment Weekly	B
The Guardian	4/5 stars
Muzik	4/5 stars
Pitchfork	6.6/10
Q	4/5 stars
Rolling Stone	3/5 stars
Stylus Magazine	A
Uncut	4/5 stars

Lost Horizons received mostly positive reviews from music critics, although several critics critiqued the album's near-constant mellowness. Stuart Mason of AllMusic called the album "a delightful but slightly faceless blend of lounge pop, subtle beats, found sound, with mellow jazz influences." A reviewer for Entertainment.ie praised the band for approaching electronica from a new angle, writing, "this London-based duo employ Playschool pianos, acoustic guitars and sprightly beats to create laid-back instrumentals guaranteed to soothe even the most restless of souls. [...] What really marks Lemon Jelly as exciting new talents is their quirky sense of humour, which they use to brighten up their sound with skilful use of nursery rhymes, brass bands and offbeat samples." Pascal Wyse of The Guardian wrote, "Everything is approachable and purely crafted, but Lost Horizons cheats banality with some choice quirks: Magnificent Seven strings, astronauts chatting, panoramic sound effects." Chris Dahlen of Pitchfork felt that the album was a little too saccharine at times, but that it is "the perfect disc to throw on after your four-disc Ultrachill Dub Groove Mix has put the whole party to sleep. It's like eight flavors of ribbon candy, beach balls hitting the ground like hail, and a big plastic clown face that blows helium."

Many reviews singled out "Nice Weather for Ducks" as the album's stand-out track. Mason selected the "dreamy, acoustic guitar-based" song as one of the album's highlights in his review. Dahlen described it as "the most likeable" on the album, and concluded that it is "a happy-slappy lollipop of a song that nicely sums this record up: Sunny, bright, and vaguely irritating." Wyse wrote, "When the flugelhorn arrives on 'Nice Weather for Ducks' it is impossible to believe there is any evil in the world."

Conversely, several critics felt that "Experiment Number Six" did not fit with the overall mood of the album. Wyse called it a "pool of darkness" that "comes as quite a shock". Dahlen felt that the song "is the only break in the [album's] mood". While he enjoyed the song's concept, calling it "so different and sinister that it's more intriguing than the rest of the album", he felt that it was "annoyingly displaced". Hermann, on the other hand, called the track "clever" and "spooky" with "music ... so well crafted that [the concept] works".

=== Sales and accolades ===
In the UK, the album charted at number 20 on the Albums Chart. In the US, it peaked at number 24 on the Billboard Top Electronic Albums chart. In both cases, it was the first Lemon Jelly album to do so. The album's two singles, "Space Walk" and "Nice Weather for Ducks", also managed to chart on the UK Singles Chart, at number 36 and 16 respectively. Again, this was a first for the band. On 20 December 2002 the album was certified Silver. Almost six months later, on 22 July 2003, it was certified Gold, denoting shipments of over 100,000. In 2003, the album was nominated for a Mercury Music Prize and a Brit Award.

== Track listing ==
All music is composed by Fred Deakin and Nick Franglen.

Lost Horizons – Standard edition
No.	Title	Length
1.	"Elements"	8:40
2.	"Space Walk"	7:00
3.	"Ramblin' Man"	7:08
4.	"Return to Patagonia"	8:40
5.	"Nice Weather for Ducks"	5:52
6.	"Experiment Number Six"	6:10
7.	"Closer"	7:24
8.	"The Curse of Ka'Zar"	9:00
Total length:		59:44

Lost Horizons – Japanese edition
No.	Title	Length
9.	"Pushy"	6:56
Total length:		66:40

== Credits and personnel ==
Band members and production

- Nick Franglen – band member, musical arrangement, additional music, production
- Fred Deakin – band member, musical arrangement, additional music, design, illustration, art direction
- Andy Diagram – train sound effects (4), trumpet (6)
- Adrian Hall – recording engineer (singing vocals on 1, choir vocals on 4)
- Cameron Jenkins – recording engineer (2–3, 6–8, music on 1, 4–5, speech on 1), audio mixing
- Dom Morley – recording engineer (vocals on 5)
- Nik Pugh – assistant recording engineer (choir vocals on 4)

Other personnel

- Doctor William Brook – speech (6)
- Michael Deakin – speech (3)
- Brian Foreman – bass guitar (1)
- Damian Hand – flutes (3, 6), saxophone (4)
- Nat Hunter – background vocals (6)
- Rory McFarlane – double bass (4, 6–7)
- Michael O'Connor – speech (2)
- Guy Pratt – bass guitar (5)
- Enn Reitel – vocals (5)
- Steve Sidwell – flugelhorns (1, 5), trumpets (5)
- John Standing – speech (1, 3)
- Carey Wilson – vocals (1), male choir vocals (4)
- Bob "Forever" Young – harmonica (1)
- Original Blend, Keith Abbs, Malcolm Abbs & Bob Hunter – vocals (1)
- Rory Blair & Melanie McFadyean – speech (4)
- Peter Bamber, Lindsay Benson, David Bevan, Michael Clarke, Bob Fardell, Fergus O’Kelley & David Porter-Thomas – Male choir vocals (4)
- Rita Campbell & Andy Kane – vocals (8)

== Charts ==
Chart performance for Lost Horizons
Chart (2002)	Peak position
UK Albums (Official Charts)	20
US Top Dance Albums (Billboard)	24

== Certifications and sales ==
Certifications for Lost Horizons
Region	Certification	Certified units/sales
United Kingdom (BPI)	Gold	100,000^{^}
^{^} Shipments figures based on certification alone.

== Bibliography ==
- Larkin, Colin (2006). The Encyclopedia of Popular Music: Kollington – Morphine. Muze. ISBN 9780195313734.
- Roberts, David (2006). British Hit Singles & Albums (19th ed.). London: Guinness World Records Limited. ISBN 9781904994107.
- Smith, Andrew (2005). Moondust: In Search of the Men who Fell to Earth. Bloomsbury. p. 438. ISBN 9780747563693.
