= Slow Train =

Slow train may refer to a regional rail service calling at all stations along the route.

Slow Train may also refer to:

- "Slow Train" (Flanders and Swann song), 1963
- "Slow Train" (Bob Dylan song), 1980
- "Slow Train", a 1974 song by Status Quo from their album Quo
- "The Slow Train", a 2005 song by Lemon Jelly from their album '64–'95
