= The Bath (EP) =

EP by Lemon Jelly
- Released: 24 August 1998
- Genre: Electronica
- Length: 20:07
- Label: Impotent Fury

Lemon Jelly chronology
The Bath (1998)	The Yellow (1999)

The Bath is the first EP released by electronica duo Lemon Jelly, according to the insert of Lemonjelly.ky, on 24 August 1998. It was limited to 1,000 10" copies, the first 200 of which featured hand screen-printed sleeves. The tracks from the EP were later incorporated for more accessible listening into the critically acclaimed Lemonjelly.ky album.

== History ==
From 1998 to 2000, Franglen and Deakin released three limited-circulation EPs (The Bath (1998), The Yellow (1999), and The Midnight (2000)) on their own label Impotent Fury. The EPs were a critical success, and led to the duo being signed to XL Recordings.

== Track listing ==
Unless otherwise indicated, information is taken from the Album’s Liner Notes

The Bath track listing
No.	Title	Writer(s)	Length
1.	"In the Bath"	Fred Deakin, Nick Franglen, Bert Kaempfert, Herbert Rehbein	6:41
2.	"Nervous Tension"	Deakin, Franglen, Lydia Wood, Tom Paxton, Peter J. Reveen	6:41
3.	"A Tune for Jack"	Deakin, Franglen, Jimmy Webb	6:45
Total length:			20:07

- "In the Bath" contains an element from "Tahitian Sunset", performed by Bert Kaempfert and his Orchestra.
- "Nervous Tension" contains elements from "The Last Thing on My Mind" and "Dance Till Your Shoes Fall Off Your Feet" performed by Nana Mouskouri and from "Relax With Reveen" performed by Peter Reveen.
- "A Tune for Jack" contains elements from "Wichita Lineman" performed by Johnny Pearson for Sounds Orchestral and from "My Baby" performed by Ken Nordine and the Fred Katz Group.

== Personnel ==
Information is taken from the Album’s Liner Notes

- Nick Franglen - band member, production
- Fred Deakin - band member, design, illustration, art direction
- Tricia Pank - additional vocals on "In the Bath"
