= Franglen =

Franglen is a surname. Notable people with the surname include:

- Nick Franglen (born 1965), British musician, record producer and installation artist
- Simon Franglen (born 1963), British composer, record producer, arrangeur and musician
