= The Yellow =

EP by Lemon Jelly
- Released: 6 September 1999
- Genre: Electronica
- Length: 22:16
- Label: Impotent Fury

Lemon Jelly chronology
The Bath (1998)	The Yellow (1999)	The Midnight (2000)

The Yellow is the name of the second EP released by English electronic music duo Lemon Jelly, according to the insert of Lemonjelly.ky, on 6 September 1999. It was limited to 1,000 10" copies, the first 240 of which featured hand screen-printed sleeves. The tracks from the EP were later incorporated for more accessible listening into the critically acclaimed Lemonjelly.ky album. When the inner sleeve was pulled out, the Lemon Jelly logo appears briefly through a series of die-cut holes in the outer sleeve creating a piece of real world animation.

== History ==
From 1998 to 2000, Franglen and Deakin released three limited-circulation EPs (The Bath (1998), The Yellow (1999), and The Midnight (Lemon Jelly EP) (2000)), on their own label Impotent Fury. The EPs were a critical success, and led to the duo being signed to XL Recordings.

== Track listing ==
Unless otherwise indicated, Information is taken from the Album’s Liner Notes

The Yellow track listing
No.	Title	Writer(s)	Length
1.	"His Majesty King Raam"	Fred Deakin, Nick Franglen, Henry Mancini, Barbra Streisand, Paul Williams, Antonio De Vita, Hal Shaper, Hal David, Leslie Bricusse	7:20
2.	"The Staunton Lick"	Deakin, Franglen	5:22
3.	"Homage to Patagonia"	Deakin, Franglen	9:34
Total length:			22:16

- "His Majesty King Raam" contains elements from "Evergreen", "Two for the Road", "Softly As I Leave You" and "The Greatest Gift" performed by Henry Mancini and his Orchestra.

== Personnel ==
- Nick Franglen - band member, production
- Fred Deakin - band member, design, illustration, art direction
- David Ashford - additional vocals (1)
- Steve "Barney" Chase - audio mixing
- Guy Pratt - additional bass played by (2)
- Earl Robinson - additional vocals (3)
- Steve Sidwell - flugelhorn (2)
- John Themis - additional guitar (2)

== See also ==
- Lemonjelly.ky
