= Mark Fry =

English painter and psychedelic folk musician (born 1952)

Mark Lewis Fry (born 4 November 1952) is an English painter and psychedelic folk musician. He is best known for his album Dreaming with Alice, released in 1972, which has been hailed as a psychedelic folk classic by critics and a diverse range of musicians.

== Early life ==
Mark Fry was born in Epping, Essex, into a family of artists descended from the Quaker founders of the Bristol-based chocolate business J. S. Fry & Sons. His father was the painter Anthony Fry. He is a cousin of Roger Fry, the artist, critic and member of the Bloomsbury Group.

Fry was educated at Dartington Hall School in Devon. On leaving Dartington in 1970 he enrolled at the Accademia di belle arti in Florence, Italy, where he studied painting under the Futurist Primo Conti.

== Dreaming with Alice ==
During Fry's time in Italy he was introduced to the record producer Vincenzo Micocci. On hearing some of Fry's songs, Micocci signed him to record label IT Dischi, a subsidiary of RCA. Dreaming with Alice was recorded by Fry and a band of session musicians in Rome over a three-day period in the summer of 1971. Following the recording session Fry toured Italy supporting singer Lucio Dalla.

Fry left Italy in autumn 1971 to return to England before the album was released. He was sent a box of the records following the release on IT Dischi records in Italy in 1972, and had no further dealings with the label. For several years, Fry continued to perform music with various musicians including drummer Pete Thomas (later of The Attractions), but without any associated record releases. In the early 1980s, after a long period of travel in the US and West Africa, Fry returned to London to pursue his career as an artist.

Unknown to Fry, the album had been developing cult status over the ensuing three decades as a psychedelic folk classic, garnering acclaim from critics and a new generation of musicians as diverse as Kieran Hebden (Four Tet), Colleen and Plastic Crimewave. Fry was to discover this by chance in the early 2000s.

Fry is featured in the anthology Galactic Ramble and in Seasons They Change: The Story of Acid, Psych and Experimental Folk.

The highest price paid at auction to date for an original copy of Dreaming with Alice was $4061 (£2968) in May 2013.

== Painting ==
Fry has achieved renown as a painter, with eight solo exhibitions since 1993 in London's West End and the Charleston Gallery. Fry's 2005 show "Into the Air" was reviewed by British periodical The Week, which wrote: "With simple lines and subtle effects of texture and shadow, Fry achieves a cool, lyrical elegance with its own dynamism."

== Recent work ==
In 2006, Sunbeam Records reissued a remastered version of Dreaming with Alice in the UK.

In January 2008, Fry released his second album, Shooting the Moon, an album of 15 songs penned over a number of years.

In November 2008, Fry was invited to appear at the fourth Million Tongues Festival in Chicago.

In February 2009, Fry collaborated with Nick Franglen of Lemon Jelly on a new version of the title song of Dreaming with Alice, which was released as a limited-edition vinyl single on Fruits de Mer Records.

In 2009 Fry was contacted by Dorset-based experimental musicians Michael Tanner and Nicholas Palmer, together known as The A. Lords. A musical collaboration ensued, and during 2009 and 2010 the three worked on new songs together, Fry adding lyrics and vocal parts to music composed and recorded by Palmer and Tanner. In May 2010 the trio played at Bush Hall in London, where they were introduced by critic Will Hodgkinson. The album I Lived in Trees by Mark Fry and The A.Lords was released in September 2011. It was well-received by critics and its release was followed by a London concert featuring Grasshopper of Mercury Rev, Guto Pryce of Super Furry Animals, Martin Smith of Tunng, Nicholas Palmer and Nick Franglen, who also produced the event.

In November 2012 the writer and producer John Lloyd chose Fry's song "Regrets" as one of the eight recordings he would like to take to a desert island in the long-running BBC Radio programme Desert Island Discs.

In April 2013 Fry played three concerts in Tokyo, which resulted in a live album, Mark Fry Live in Japan.

In September 2014 Fry released a further album, South Wind, Clear Sky.

In 2025 Mark Fry released the album Not on the Radar.

== Discography ==
=== Albums ===
- Dreaming with Alice LP (IT ZLST 70006), RCA / IT Dischi, 1971
- Dreaming with Alice CD (SBR CD5028), Sunbeam Records, 2006
- Dreaming with Alice LP (SBR LP5028), (includes two bonus tracks), Sunbeam Records, 2007 and 2010
- Shooting the Moon (IDLECD001), Boredidlebaby, 2008
- I Lived in Trees (SL013), Second Language, 2011
- Mark Fry Live in Japan (CT-1211/CT-710), Captain Trip Records, 2014
- South Wind, Clear Sky (SL032), Second Language, 2014
- Not on the Radar (SL050), Second Language, 2025

=== Singles ===
- "Dreaming with Alice" (A side) / "The Witch" (live) (B side), Fruits de Mer Vol. 5, (Crustacean06), Fruits de Mer, 2009

=== Compilation appearances ===
- "Mandolin Man" is included in Love, Peace & Poetry – British Psychedelic Music (QDKCD041), Normal Records, 2001
- "Song for Wilde" is included in Shifting Sands (SBRCD5075), Sunbeam Records, 2010
- "I Lived in Trees" is included in Vertical Integration (SL06), Second Language, 2010
- "Song for Wilde" is included in the October 2011 edition of the Late Night Tales series (ALNCD26), curated by US band MGMT
- "Dreaming with Alice" (single version) is included in Plankton (RCLP008), Record Collector, 2013
- "In Times Like These" is included in Music and Migration III (SL025), Second Language, 2013
- "The Witch" is included in Love Poetry and Revolution (CRSEGBOX025), Grapefruit Records, 2013

== Solo exhibitions ==
- Christopher Hull Gallery, London – 1993, 1995, 1998
- The Charleston Gallery, Sussex – 2006
- Archeus Fine Art, London – 2001, 2003, 2005
- Gallery 286, London – 2013
