= Mikiki =

Coordinates: 22.3337°N 114.1968°E

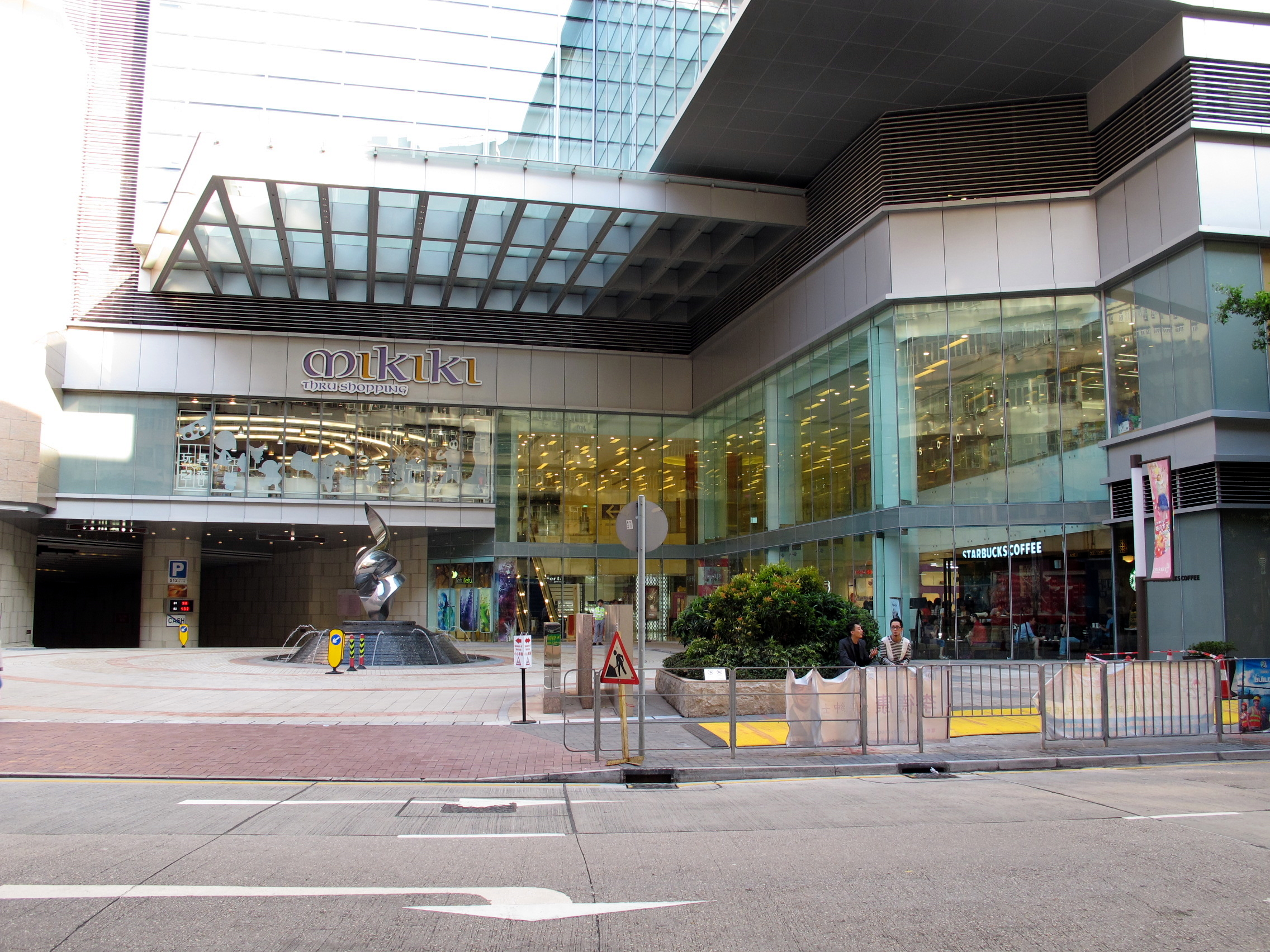
- Mikiki's entrance along King Fuk Street
- Location: 638 Prince Edward Road East, San Po Kong, Kowloon
- Opened: July 2011; 15 years ago
- Manager: Sun Hung Kai Properties & Hong Yip Service Co Ltd.
- Owner: Sun Hung Kai Properties
- Architect: AGC Design
- Floor area: 210,000 square feet (20,000 m^{2})
- Website: http://www.mikiki-mall.com.hk

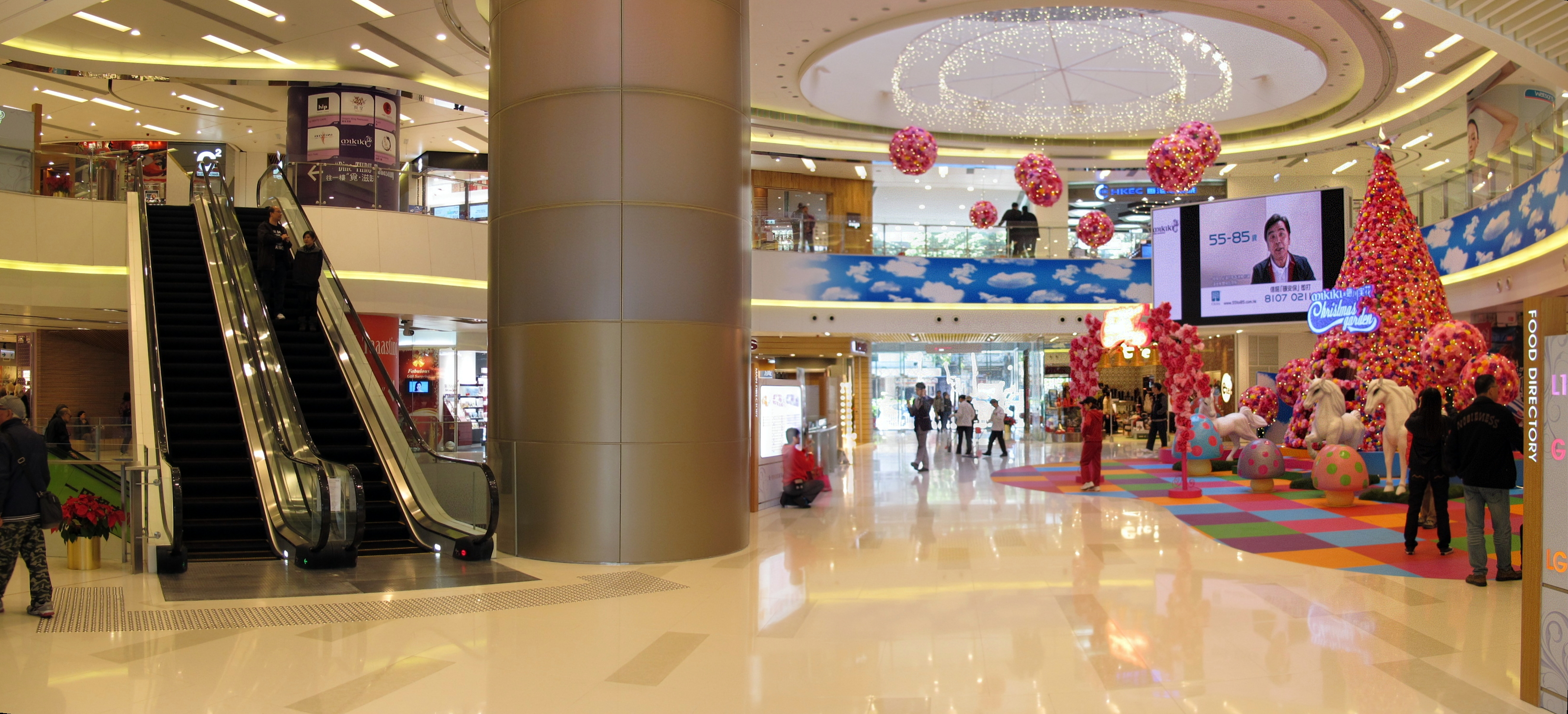
Mikiki's atrium

Mikiki is a shopping centre in San Po Kong, Kowloon, Hong Kong. It is owned by Sun Hung Kai Properties. Mikiki is directly connected to The Latitude, a private housing estate that was also developed by Sun Hung Kai Properties. Mikiki does not have a Chinese name, and its English name is based on the Japanese word for "knowledge". Mikiki covers an area of 200,000 square feet and has been opened to the general public since July 2011. Its official opening date was on 30 October that year. The mall is managed by Sun Hung Kai Properties and Hong Yip Service Co Ltd.

== Basic information ==
Mikiki covers an area of 200,000 square feet; the cost of construction and design was HK$160 million. The exterior design of Mikiki resembles a glass box. There are 98 stores in the mall, with 35 per cent of them being restaurants, 24 per cent clothing retail stores, 15 per cent supermarkets and convenience stores and 12 per cent furniture, CD and electronic stores. The target audience of the shops of the mall tends to be young customers.

According to a press release by the developer, Mikiki means "knowledge" or "experience" (見聞き/みきき) in Japanese.

== Mall design ==
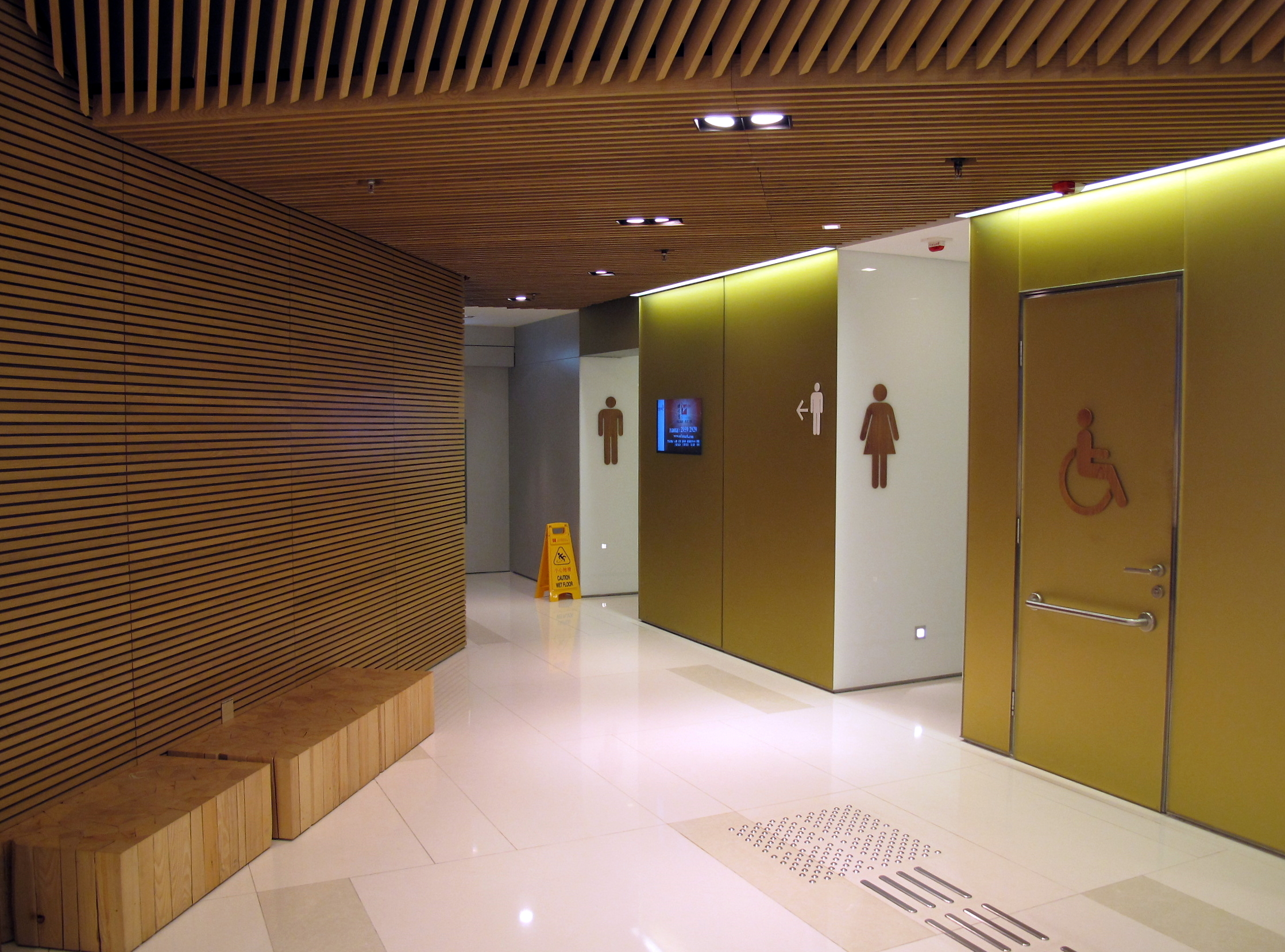
The public sitting area of the mall was originally situated outside the toilets' entrance. This sitting area was later removed.

The design of Mikiki resembles other malls built by Sun Hung Kai Properties, with its similar dropped ceiling, exterior walls and floor. The mall's interiors are mainly white in colour without decorations. These walls are used for advertising purposes to generate extra revenue. The mall has an ordinary design for its toilets.

Originally, there was a sitting area near the entrance to the toilets, but it was later removed. Nowadays, there's a sitting area on the LG floor at the parking lot where merchandise is loaded and unloaded, yet its exact location is undisclosed to the general public.

== Mall structure ==
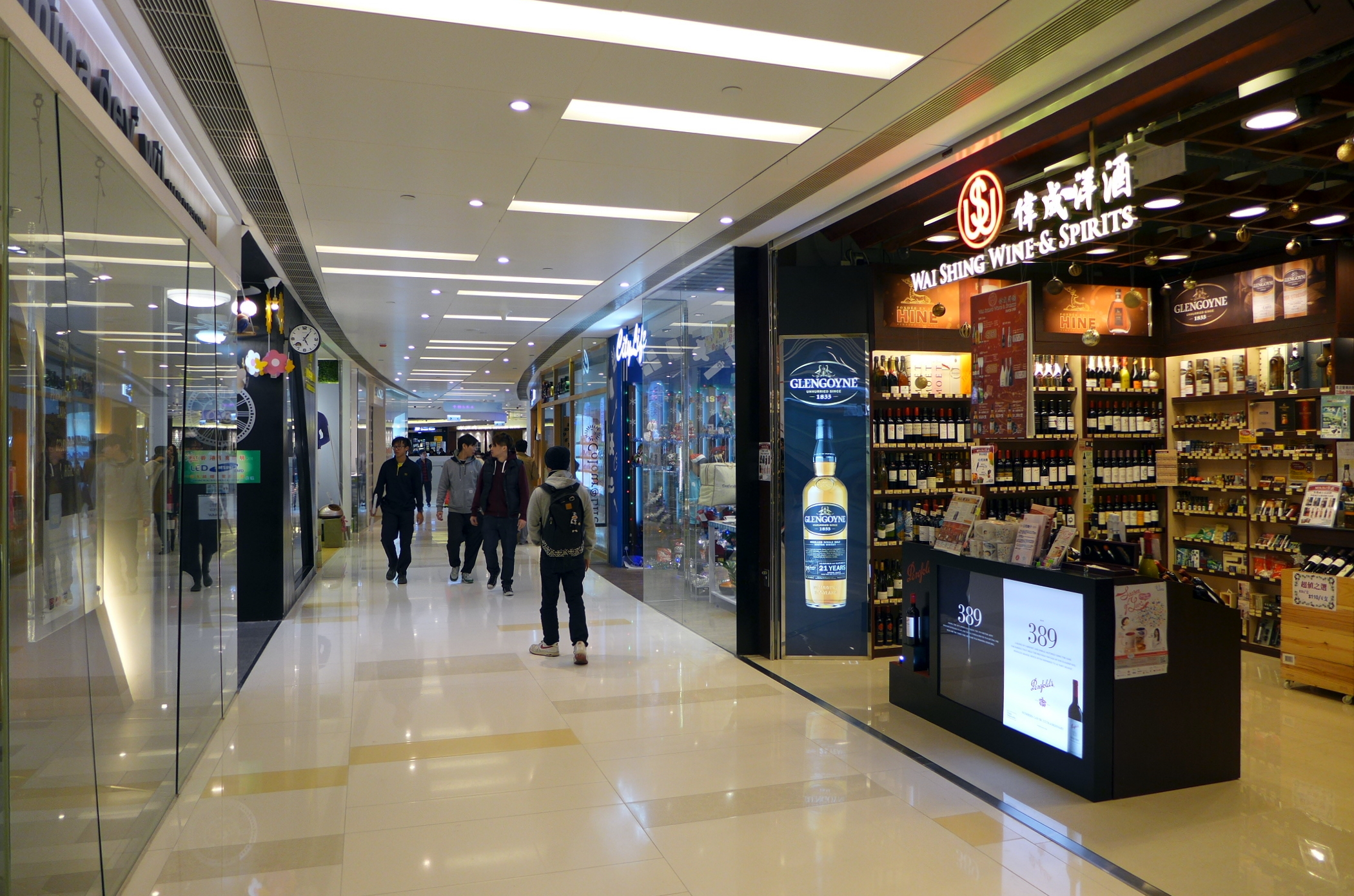
Level 1 Shops

=== LG ===
This floor has a food court which consists of six restaurants and a Yata store, which covers an area of 19,608 square feet. There is also a public minibus station with an escalator leading to the parking lot on this floor.

=== G ===
The main entrance is on the ground floor. There is a 1,200 sq. ft. Starbucks store located nearby with a theme related to Hong Kong's old Kai Tak Airport, which was located near the area of San Po Kong. There are also other stores which mainly sell snacks and food. Within the mall, there are clothing retail and sportswear stores.

=== L1 ===
The first floor's main tenant was the Metrobooks bookstore, which occupied an area of 3,200 sq. ft, with various furniture, eyewear, toy and electronic stores nearby. It has been replaced with the Daiso store.

== Public transport ==
A number of buses stop at the intersection of Prince Edward Road East and Choi Hung Road right outside Mikiki. A footbridge indirectly connected Mikiki with Exit B of the Kai Tak station of the MTR. As of 28 September 2023, the same footbridge now connects Mikiki with Exit C of the Kai Tak station via AIRSIDE.
