= Lemon Jelly (disambiguation) =

Lemon Jelly can be:

- Lemon Jelly, a British electronica duo.
- Lemon jelly, the lemon flavoured variety of a gelatin dessert known as jelly in most of the Commonwealth Nations, and generically as jello in the United States and Canada.
