= Kai Tak station =

MTR station in Kowloon, Hong Kong

Kai Tak 啟德
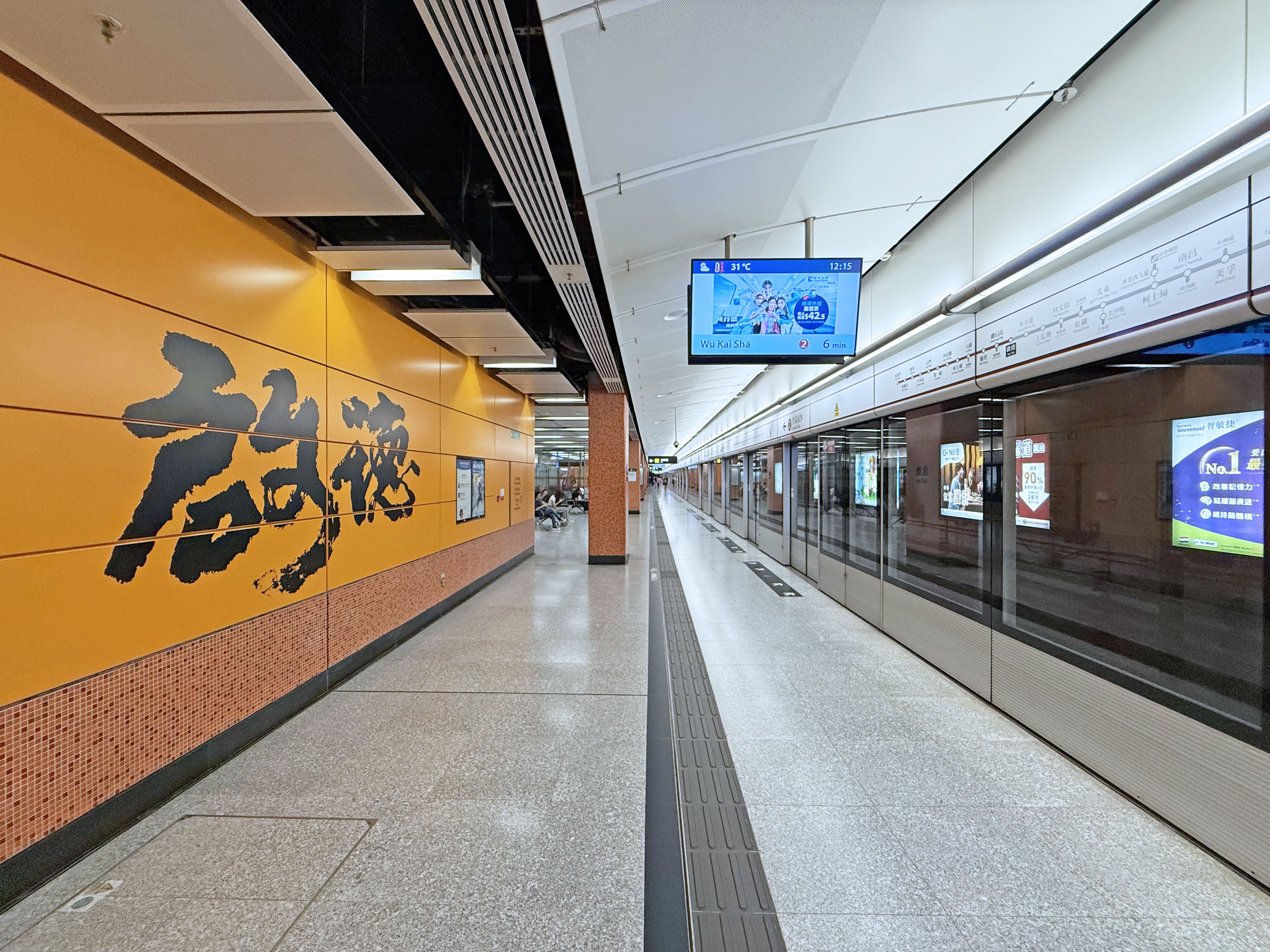
- Platform 2

Chinese name
- Traditional Chinese: 啟德
- Simplified Chinese: 启德
- Cantonese Yale: Káidāk
Transcriptions
Standard Mandarin
- Hanyu Pinyin: Qǐdé
- Wade–Giles: Ch'i^{3}-te^{2}
Yue: Cantonese
- Yale Romanization: Káidāk
- Jyutping: Kai^{2}dak^{1}

General information
- Location: Concorde Road, Kai Tak Development Area; Kowloon City District, Hong Kong
- Coordinates: 22°19′49″N 114°11′58″E
- System: MTR rapid transit station
- Owner: MTR Corporation
- Operator: MTR Corporation
- Line: Tuen Ma line
- Platforms: 2 (1 island platform)
- Tracks: 2

Construction
- Structure type: Underground
- Accessible: Yes

Other information
- Station code: KAT

History
- Opened: 14 February 2020; 6 years ago

Services
Preceding station	MTR	Following station
Sung Wong Toi towards Tuen Mun	Tuen Ma line	Diamond Hill towards Wu Kai Sha
Route map
Location
- Location within MTR

Kai Tak (Chinese: 啟德) is an underground MTR rapid transit station located on the Tuen Ma line, in the Kai Tak Development area of Hong Kong (near the old east apron of the former Kai Tak Airport in Kowloon City District). The station was opened on 14 February 2020 as part of the Tuen Ma line's first phase. It provides access to the multi-purpose Kai Tak Sports Park, as well as other facilities of the Kai Tak area. The station was built as part of the Sha Tin to Central Link (SCL). Its livery is orange.

== History ==
The contract to construct Kai Tak station (and the approach tunnels), valued at HK$1,422,000,000, was awarded on 25 April 2013 to the Kaden-Chun Wo joint venture. The station was built using the cut-and-cover method. A topping-out ceremony was held on 16 July 2015. It was the second SCL station to be topped out, after Hin Keng.

The station opened on 14 February 2020. It acted as the southern terminus for the Ma On Shan line (renamed Tuen Ma Line Phase 1 on the same day) until the entire Tuen Ma line opened on 27 June 2021.

The station was temporarily closed on 17 July 2020 after a wartime bomb was found nearby. The station reopened on the morning of the next day.

== Features ==
The station includes an artwork within the adit leading to Exit A. Entitled Memories of Kai Tak – 1925–1998, the piece comprises a display of more than 30 photos and other materials related to the former Kai Tak Airport. It was designed by Cliff Dunnaway, author of two books about Hong Kong's aviation history.

== Station layout ==
The station has two levels: a concourse level above a lower level with an island platform.

G	Ground level	Exits
L1	Concourse	Customer service, MTRshops
L2; Platforms	Siding	No passenger service
L2; Platforms	Platform 1	← Tuen Ma line towards Tuen Mun (Sung Wong Toi)
L2; Platforms	Island platform, doors will open on the left
L2; Platforms	Platform 2	Tuen Ma line towards Wu Kai Sha (Diamond Hill) →

=== Exits ===
- A: Kai Ching Estate/Tak Long Estate
- B1: The Twins Tower 1 (SOGO), AIA Finance Centre
- B2: Cullinan Sky, Cullinan Sky Mall
- C: AIRSIDE, Kai Tak Underground Shopping Street (opened 28 September 2023), Mikiki, The Latitude, Trade and Industry Tower, Inland Revenue Centre
- D: Kai Tak Sports Park, Kai Tak Arena, Kai Tak Stadium, Kai Tak Mall, OASIS KAI TAK, One Kai Tak, THE HENLEY, Henley Park, MONACO

== Gallery ==
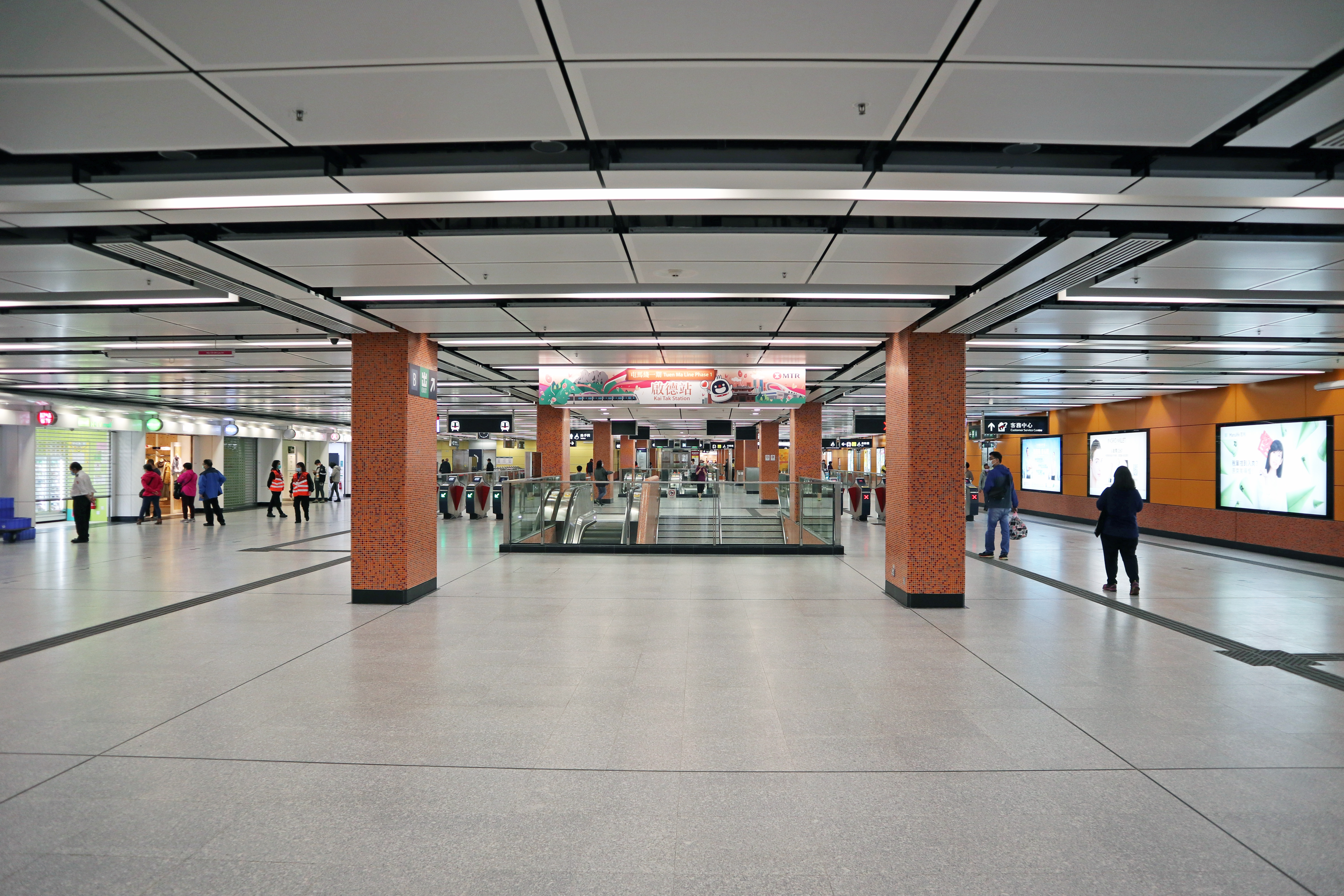
Concourse

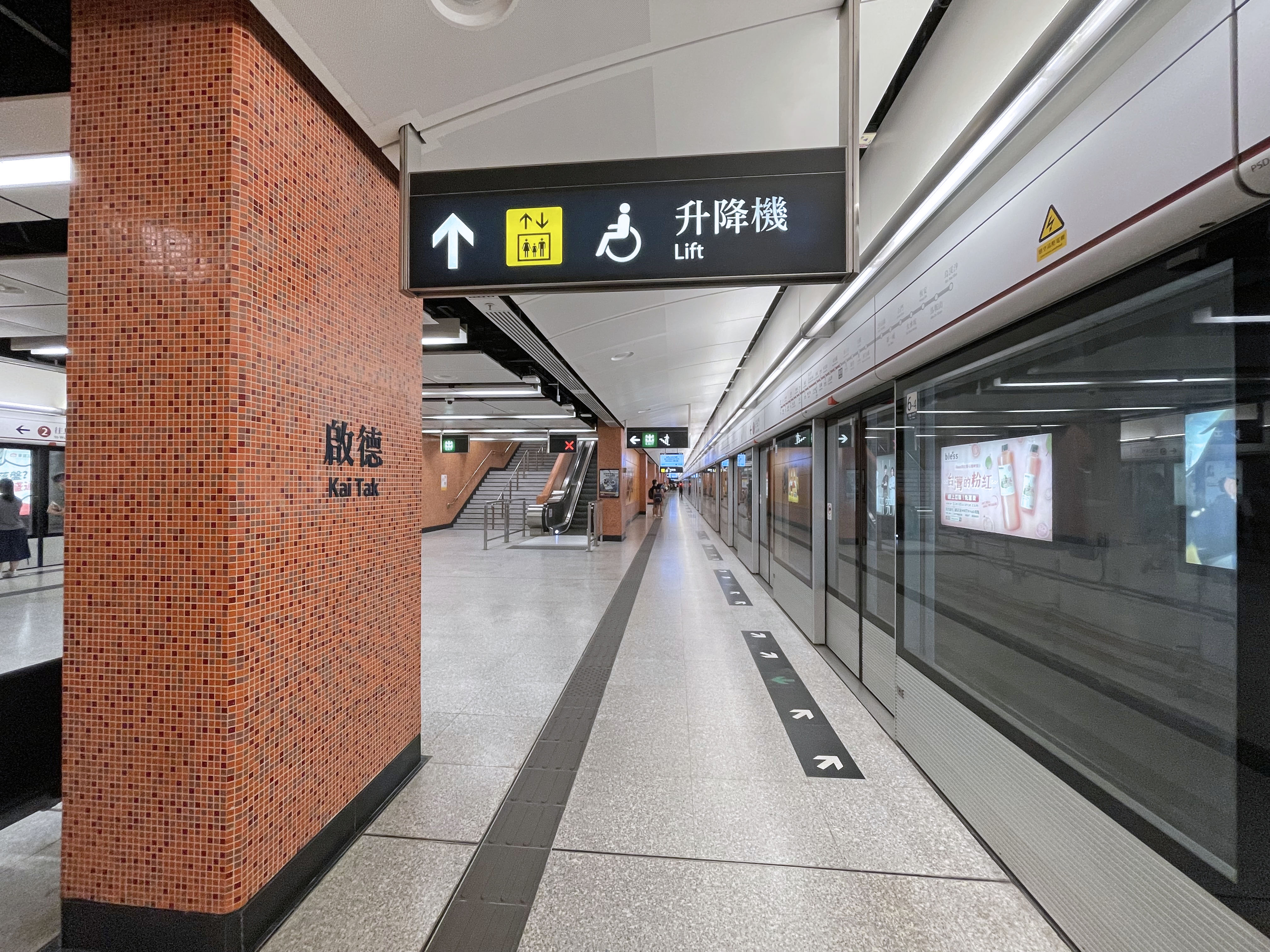
Platform 1

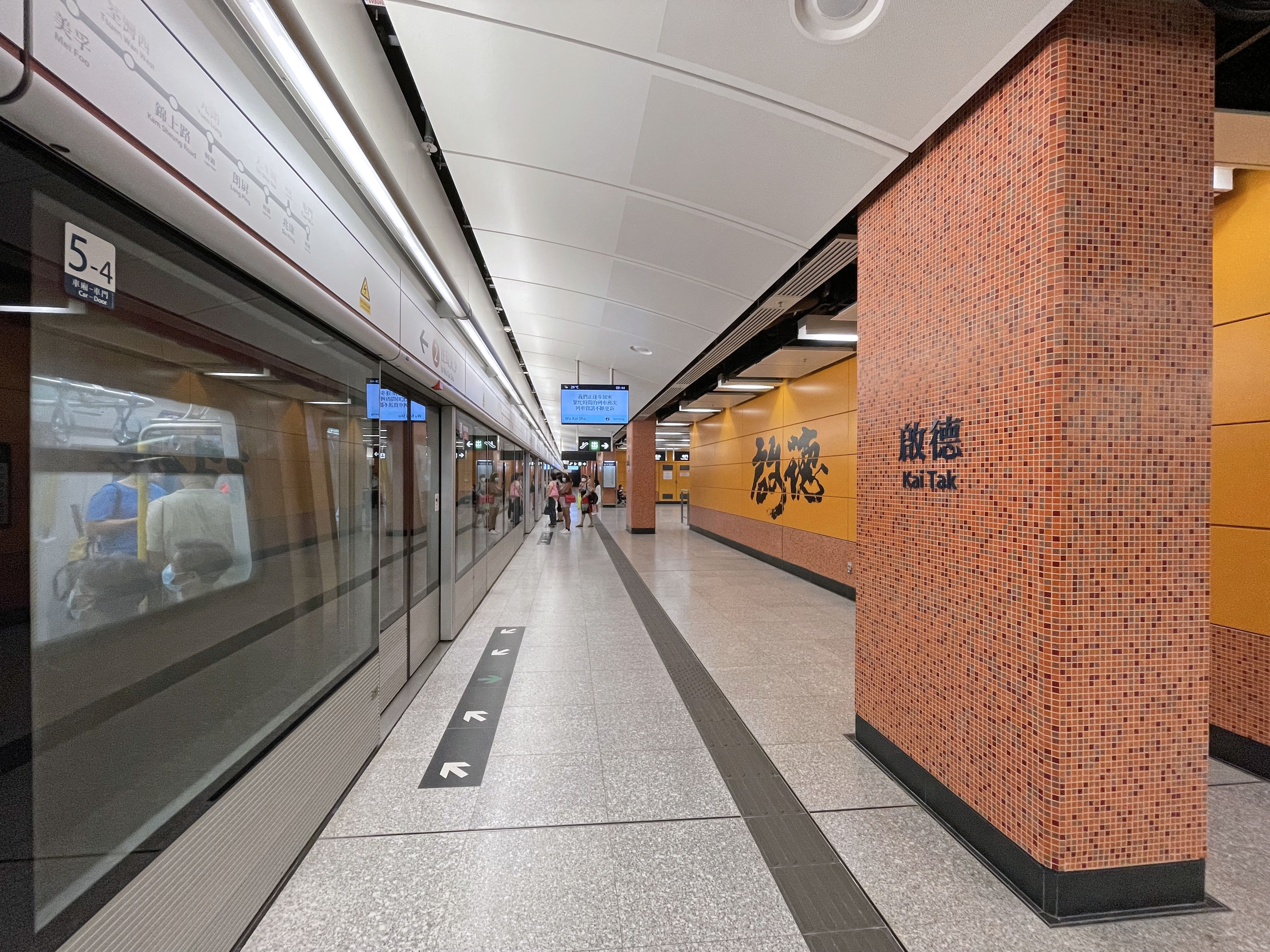
Platform 2

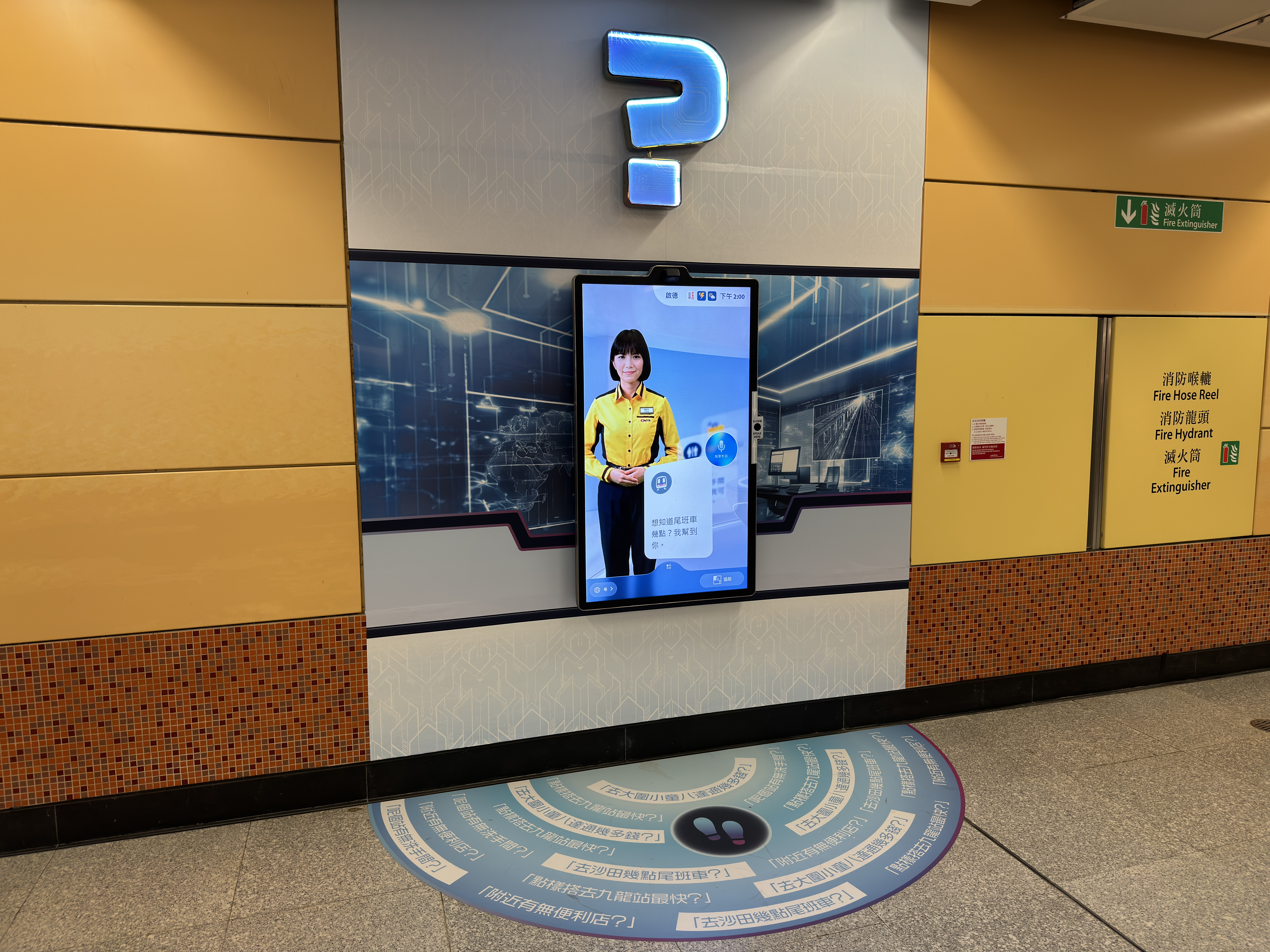
AI Tracy

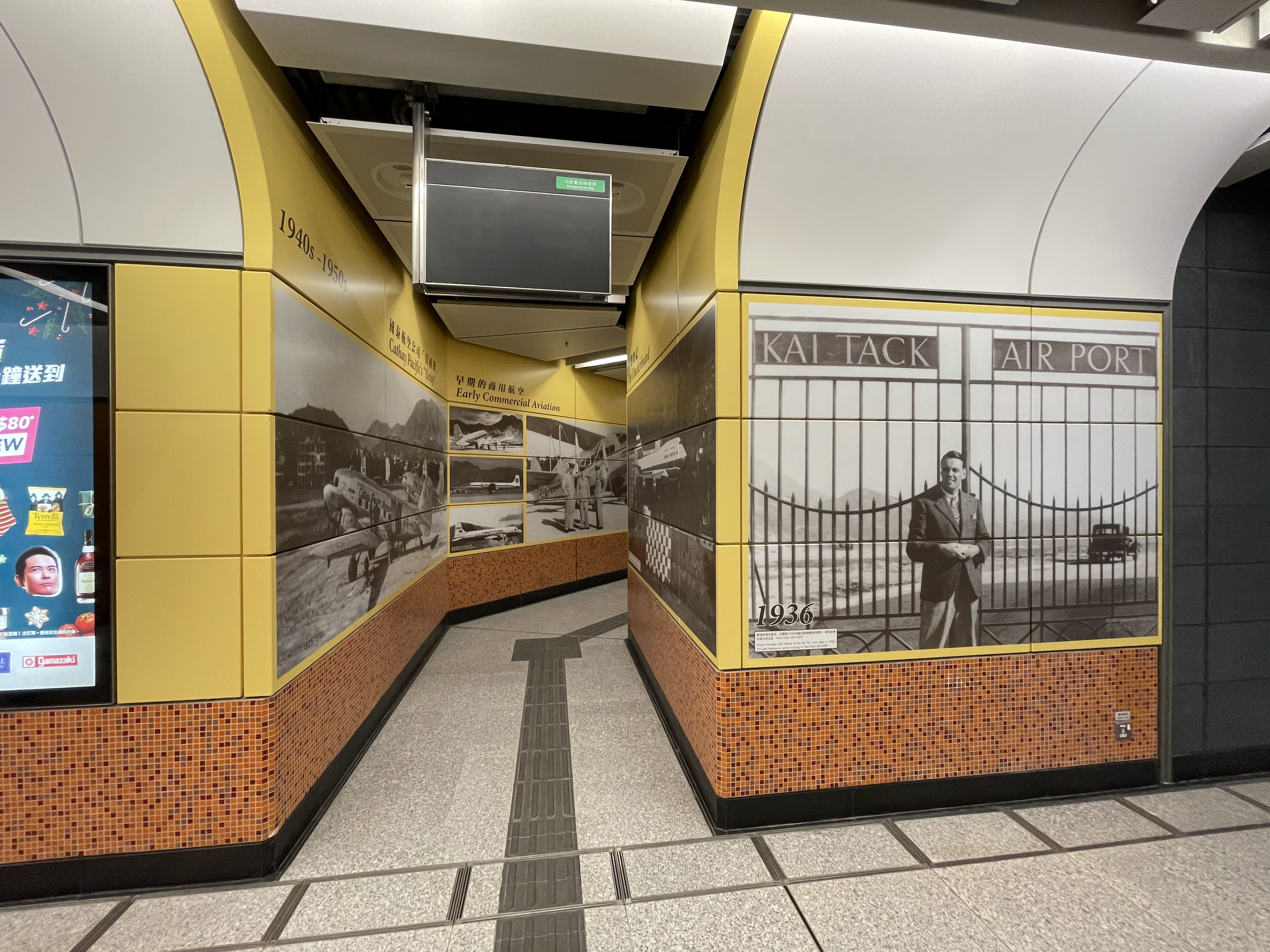
Decoration showing history of Kai Tak Airport
