= Lemonjelly.ky =

Compilation album by Lemon Jelly
- Released: 23 October 2000
- Recorded: 1998–2000
- Genre: Downtempo
- Length: 67:25
- Label: Impotent Fury (UK); XL; Sony BMG (Japan)
- Producer: Lemon Jelly

Lemon Jelly chronology
The Midnight (2000)	Lemonjelly.ky (2000)	Lost Horizons (2002)

Lemonjelly.ky is the debut album by the British duo Lemon Jelly, released on 23 October 2000. It compiles all nine tracks originally released on the duo's first three limited edition EPs: The Bath, The Yellow and The Midnight, although minor changes were made for the album release.

== Critical reception ==
Professional ratings
Aggregate scores
Source	Rating
Metacritic	79/100
Review scores
Source	Rating
AllMusic	4/5 stars
Drowned in Sound	8/10
Pitchfork	4.2/10
Rolling Stone	3.5/5 stars

Lemonjelly.ky received a score of 79 out of 100 based on nine reviews on review aggregator Metacritic, including "generally favorable reviews" from critics.

== Track listing ==
All music is composed by Fred Deakin and Nick Franglen.

Lemonjelly.ky track listing
No.	Title	Length
1.	"In the Bath"	6:41
2.	"Nervous Tension"	6:41
3.	"A Tune for Jack"	6:45
4.	"His Majesty King Raam"	7:20
5.	"The Staunton Lick"	5:22
6.	"Homage to Patagonia"	9:34
7.	"Kneel Before Your God"	7:20
8.	"Page One"	9:12
9.	"Come"	8:30
Total length:		67:25

The recording details are in the EP articles:

- The Bath EP (1998)
- The Yellow EP (1999)
- The Midnight EP (2000)

In 2026, Rough Trade Records re-released the compilation on vinyl limited to 1500 copies for their 50th anniversary editions.

== Usage ==
The Track "The Staunton Lick" was used in the last scene of the finale of the tv-series Spaced.
