= Soft/Rock =

Single by Lemon Jelly
- A-side: "Soft"
- B-side: "Rock"
- Released: 2001
- Label: None

"Soft/Rock" is the debut single by English electronic music duo Lemon Jelly, which was released on 21 June 2001. The 7" single was released in two formats; the first was limited to 1,000 copies and released on blue vinyl, each coming in its own hand-stitched denim sleeve with a flavoured condom, the second was also limited to 1,000 copies but released on black vinyl in a black sleeve with a sticker.

The first twelve or so (exact numbers unknown) of the blue vinyl edition were different in design from the others, featuring enhanced embroidery and a business card from the award-winning embroidery artist, Laura Lees. These extremely rare singles were very time-consuming to fabricate, so the design was simplified for the remainder of the format. Therefore, the first twelve are highly sought after and occasionally change hands on eBay for several hundred pounds.

The A-side, "Soft", features an uncleared sample from Chicago's "If You Leave Me Now" with a vocal track taken from an archive episode of the religious "Pause for Thought" segment of a BBC Radio 2 show. The B-side titled "Rock" contains samples of the Black Crowes version of Otis Redding's "Hard to Handle".

"Soft", samples intact, would eventually be properly released as the B-side for "Nice Weather for Ducks" in 2003.

"Soft" was also featured on the Shaun of the Dead soundtrack album, mixed in with samples of dialogue from the film.
