= '64–'95 =

Studio album by Lemon Jelly
- Released: 31 January 2005
- Recorded: 2004
- Genre: Electronic, Dance
- Length: 53:06
- Label: Impotent Fury (UK); XL
- Producer: Nick Franglen

Lemon Jelly chronology
Lost Horizons (2002)	'64–'95 (2005)

Singles from '64–'95
- 1. "Stay With You" Released: 22 November 2004; 2. "The Shouty Track" Released: 24 January 2005; 3. "Make Things Right" Released: 11 July 2005

Professional ratings
Review scores
Source	Rating
AllMusic	4.5/5 stars
Pitchfork	6.5/10

'64–'95 is the third studio album by English electronic music duo Lemon Jelly. The concept album contains 10 tracks that take samples from songs recorded between the years 1964 and 1995. The number that precedes the song title denotes from which year the sample is taken.

The album is rather different from their previous two releases in that it has a darker sound and is influenced by more modern sounding music. To avoid confusion over the matter, the band included a sticker on the sleeve stating, "This is our new album, it's not like our old album."

A hidden track, "Yes!", appears before track 1 on the special edition CD version of the album. This is a short additional spoken word sample featuring the same voice which appears on the first track, "It Was...". A DVD version of the album was also released, with animated videos for each track.

== Track listing ==
Adapted from the album's liner notes

0. "Yes!" – 1:23
1. "It Was..." – 0:24
2. "'88 aka Come Down on Me" – 5:50
3. "'68 aka Only Time" – 6:36
4. "'93 aka Don't Stop Now" – 6:56
5. "'95 aka Make Things Right" – 6:00
6. "'79 aka The Shouty Track" – 3:41
7. "'75 aka Stay with You" – 6:10
8. "'76 aka The Slow Train" – 5:40
9. "'90 aka A Man Like Me" – 5:16
10. "'64 aka Go" – 6:30

Notes

- Lemon Jelly is Nick Franglen and Fred Deakin
- Music arrangement and sampling, additional material composition and additional instruments and vocals performed by Lemon Jelly
- "Yes!" is a hidden track that can only be played by rewinding from track 1 to the -1:23 point.
- "Slow Train" sample written by Flanders & Swann
- "I'm a Train" sample is taken from The King's Singers performance of "I'm a Train" on the album "Lollipops" (original song written by Albert Hammond)

== Charts ==
Chart (2005)	Peak position
Australian Albums (ARIA)	97
UK Albums (OCC)	17
US Top Dance Albums (Billboard)	8
