= Dom Morley =

British sound engineer and record producer

Dom Morley is a British sound engineer and record producer.

He started his career in the late 1990s at DEP International Studios in Birmingham before moving to London in 1999 to take a position at Metropolis Studios. Here he worked his way up through the ranks, engineering for such producers as Tony Visconti, Phil Spector and Mark Ronson. It was his work with Ronson on the Amy Winehouse Back to Black album that won him the Record Of The Year Grammy Award in 2008.

Since then Morley has become a freelance engineer and producer working recently with such artists as Sting, Adele, Grinderman, Kate Walsh, The Police, Colin MacIntyre and Jeff Beck. He produced the Mull Historical Society album City Awakenings.

== Selected credits ==
- Amy Winehouse - Back to Black
- Mark Ronson - Version
- Grinderman - Grinderman
- Jet - Shine On EP
- Colin MacIntyre - The Water
- I Am Kloot - I Am Kloot
- Lemonjelly - Singles "'64-'95"
- The Verve - Anthology
- Live8 - Live8 DVD
