= Author! Author! (album) =

Studio album by Scars
- Released: 1981
- Studio: Advision Studios, London
- Genre: Post-punk
- Length: 38:04 (LP); 64:18 (CD reissue)
- Label: PRE Records, Charisma (LP); PreVS (CD reissue)
- Producer: Robert Blamire

Author! Author! is the only studio album by the Scottish post-punk band Scars. It was released in 1981.

== Track listing ==
All tracks composed by Scars; except where indicated

=== Side A ===
No.	Title	Length
1.	"Leave Me in Autumn"	2:47
2.	"Fear of the Dark"	3:12
3.	"Aquarama"	4:52
4.	"David"	3:22
5.	"Obsessions"	4:52

=== Side B ===
No.	Title	Writer(s)	Length
1.	"Everywhere I Go"		3:39
2.	"The Lady in the Car with Glasses On and a Gun!"		3:36
3.	"Je t'aime c'est la mort" (I Love You It's Death)		3:10
4.	"Your Attention Please"	lyrics: Peter Porter; arranged by Scars	3:20
5.	"All About You"		5:08

== 2007 reissue ==
In 2007 the album was reissued on CD. Besides the original ten songs, it also contained the bonus songs most of which had been released on singles and an EP in 1980 and 1981.

=== Track listing ===
No.	Title	Writer(s)	Length
1.	"Leave Me in Autumn"		2:50
2.	"Fear of the Dark"		3:14
3.	"Aquarama"		4:53
4.	"David"		3:25
5.	"Obsessions"		4:57
6.	"Everywhere I Go"		3:42
7.	"The Lady in the Car with Glasses On and a Gun!"		3:38
8.	"Je t'aime c'est la mort" (I Love You It's Death)		3:10
9.	"Your Attention Please"		3:44
10.	"All About You"		5:16
11.	"Silver Dream Machine"	David Essex	3:57
12.	"She's Alive"		2:58
13.	"All About You" (single version)		4:00
14.	"Author! Author!"		2:52
15.	"Love Song"		3:05
16.	"Psychomodo"	Steve Harley	3:00
17.	"They Came and Took Her"		2:49
18.	"Romance by Mail"		2:39

== Personnel ==
Scars

- Robert King - vocals
- Paul Research - electric guitar, piano, backing vocals
- John Mackie - bass guitar, backing vocals
- Stephen McLaughlin - drums, percussion

with:

- Bobby Charm, Julz Sale, Laurence Diana, Robert Blamire - backing vocals
