= Akasha (band) =

English electronic music duo

- Origin: London, England
- Genres: Electronic
- Years active: 1994–present
- Labels: Wall of Sound, Ra Recordings
- Members: Charlie Casey; Damian Hand

Akasha are an English electronic music duo, comprising Charlie Casey and Damian Hand. They were originally signed to the Wall of Sound record label, but now are releasing through Ra Recordings.

== History ==
Formed in 1994 in Brixton, London, Casey contributes electronics, guitar, and vocals, with Hand contributing saxophone, flute, and vocals. Their first track appeared on a DJ Bizzniss EP, released on Payday Recordings. The track was then licensed through Pressure Drop, who recommended them to Wall Of Sound. This led to the release of the Jazadelica EP in 1995, and a performance on The Jazz Stage at Glastonbury Festival, followed by the singles "Spanish Fly" in 1996 and "Brown Sugar" in 1997. Appearances on various compilations followed, and the release of their first album, Cinematique, in 1998, including guest appearances from Neneh Cherry and Maxi Jazz.

Akasha then toured Belgium, France and Germany. In 1999, all tracks on Cinematique were remixed and released as a remix album.

Casey and Hand have worked with bands and artists like Lemon Jelly, Neneh Cherry, Groove Armada, Art of Noise and Jerry Dammers' Spatial AKA Orchestra.

Akasha released their second album Love Philtre Magick in 2003, and third album Hail the sun in 2015.

Vocal guests on Hail the Sun include St Etienne's Sarah Cracknell, Heidi Vogel and Polish singer Anita Lipnicka.

== Discography ==
=== Albums ===
- Cinematique (1998), Wall of Sound
- Cinematique - The Remixes (1999), Wall of Sound
- Love Philtre Magick (2003), RA Recordings
- Hail the Sun (2015), RA Recordings

=== Singles and EPs ===
- Jazadelica EP (1995), Wall of Sound
- "Spanish Fly" (1996), Wall of Sound
- "Brown Sugar" (1997), Wall of Sound
- Cinematique, The Remixes Vol.1 (1999), Wall of Sound
- Cinematique, The Remixes Vol.2 (1999), Wall of Sound
- Cinematique, The Remixes Vol.3 (1999), Wall of Sound
- "Mugwamp Mondo" (2001), RA Recordings
- Love Philtre Magick - The Remixes (2004), RA Recordings
- "She's Groovy" (2005), RA Recordings
- Hail the Sun - Remixes (2015), RA Recordings
