= The Latitude =

Private housing estate in Hong Kong

Coordinates: 22.3333959°N 114.1944804°E

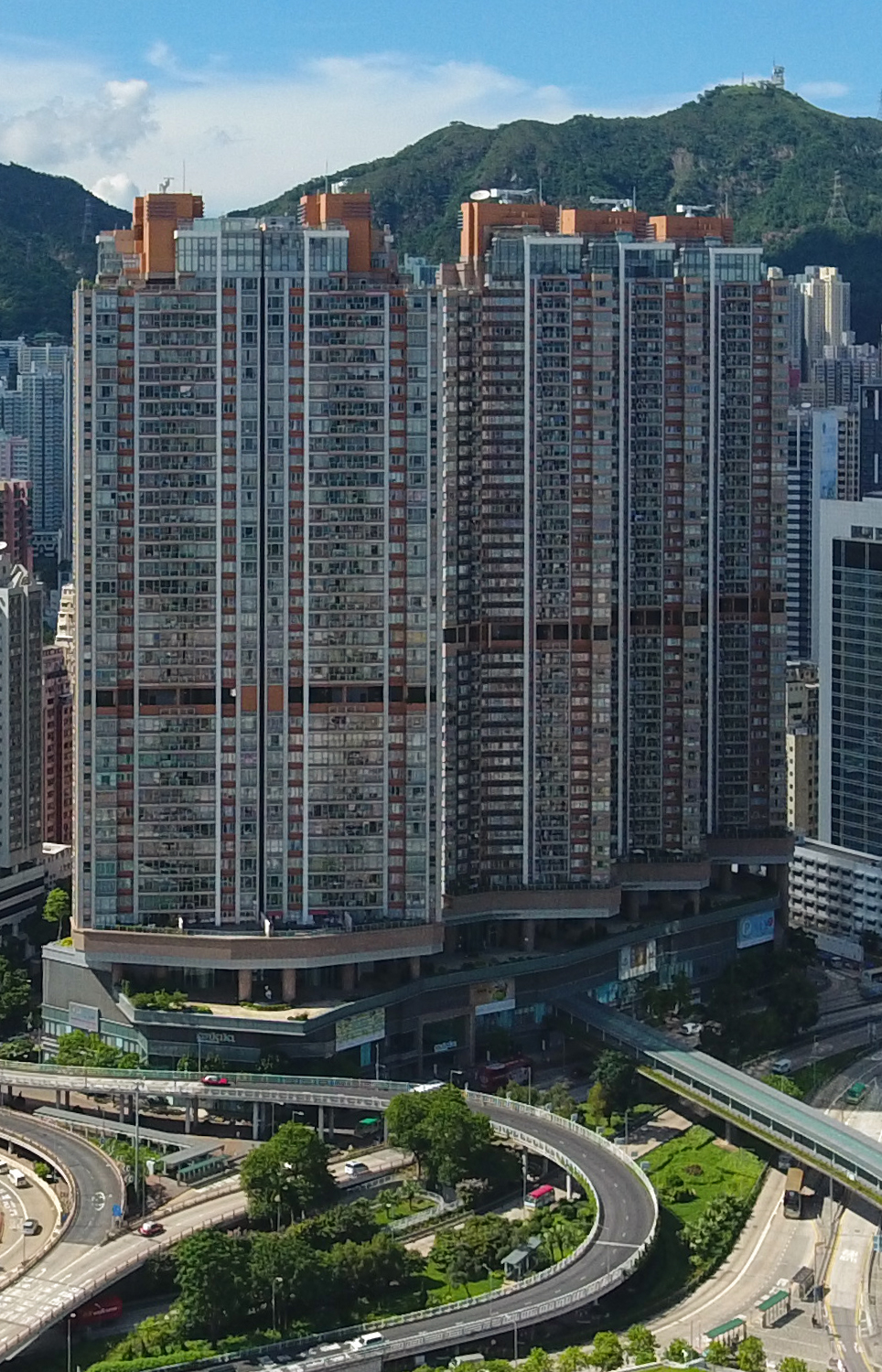
The Latitude

The Latitude (Chinese: 譽．港灣) is a private housing estate in San Po Kong, Hong Kong. It was developed by Sun Hung Kai Properties and was completed in 2010.

A 1-room flat was sold for HK$6.95 million in November 2016, and a 2-room was sold for HK$10.05 million in February 2017.

The podium of the estate is home to Mikiki, a shopping mall.

== Facilities ==
The Latitude contains a clubhouse called Club Latitude. Features in the Clubhouse include an outdoor swimming pool, an indoor swimming pool, a restaurant, a children's playroom and a home cinema.
