= Airside (company) =

Design studio in London

- Type: Small and medium enterprise
- Founded: London, United Kingdom (1998)
- Defunct: 2012
- Headquarters: London

Airside was a design studio founded in 1998 by Alex Maclean, Nat Hunter and Fred Deakin. The company won many awards, including recognition from D&AD, BAFTA and Design Week.

Co-founder Deakin is one half of ambient/electronica music duo Lemon Jelly. Promotional material for Lemon Jelly, including posters, album covers and videos was produced by Airside.

== History ==
Founded before the dot-com bubble, Airside was initially known as a graphic design company; it later diversified into film-making with animation. The company closed in 2012, after being suspended for a year.
