= Airside (building) =

AIRSIDE
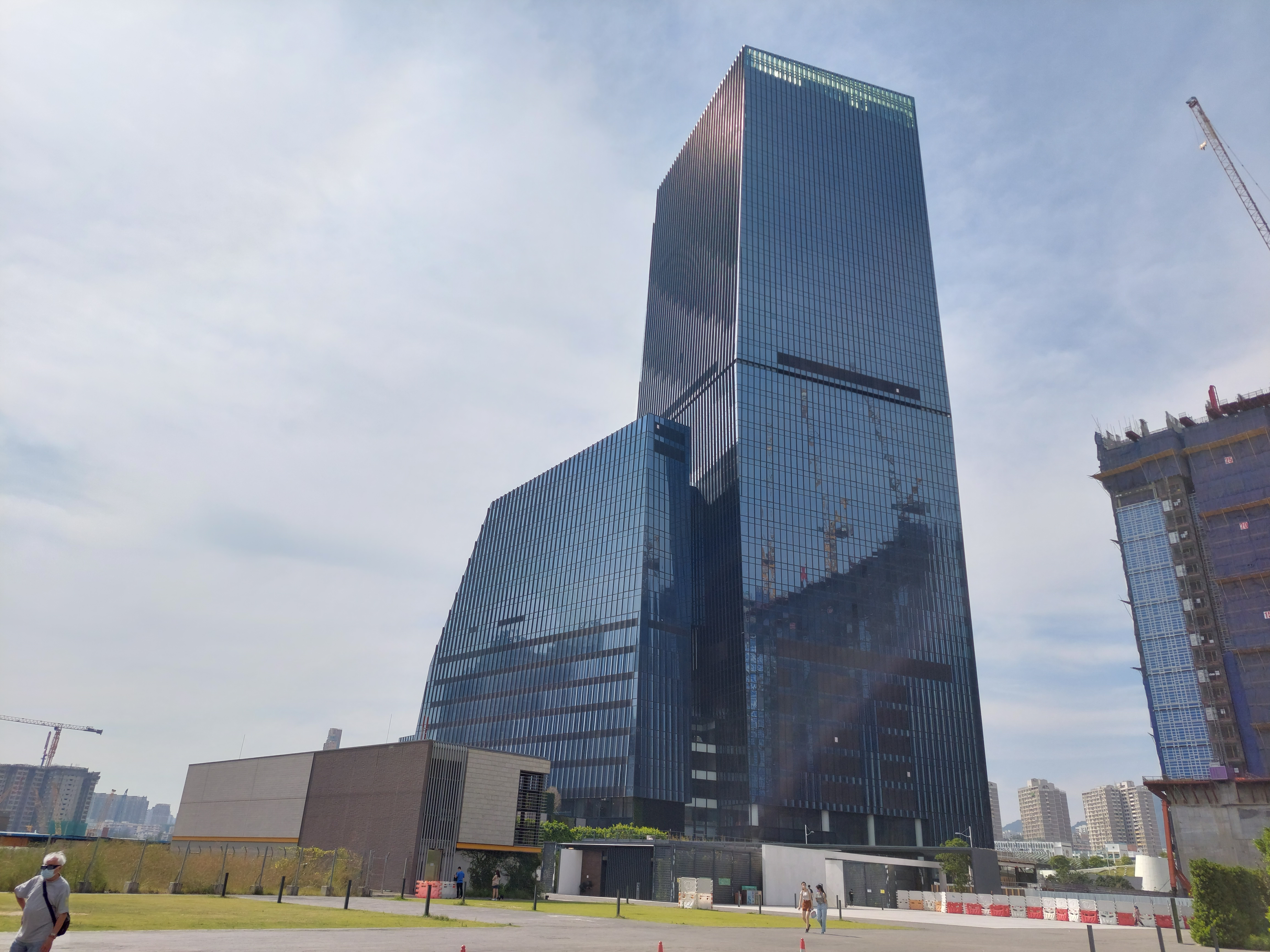
- Location: Kai Tak, Kowloon City District, Kowloon, Hong Kong
- Coordinates: 22.3315°N 114.1982°E
- Address: 2 Concorde Road
- Opened: 28 September 2023
- Developer: Nan Fung Group (Nan Fung)
- Floor area: 1.9 million sq. ft. (total) 700,000 sq. ft. (shopping mall)
- Floors: 47 (total) B1 - 9/F (shopping mall, including G but excluding 5/F) 9 - 47/F (offices, excluding 13-14/F, 24-26/F, 34/F and 44/F)
- Public transit: MTR Kai Tak station Exit C
- Website: https://www.airside.com.hk

Airside (stylized as AIRSIDE) is a skyscraper developed by Nan Fung Group (Nan Fung) in Hong Kong. Located in the Kai Tak neighbourhood in Kowloon, Airside forms part of the Kai Tak Development on the former area of Kai Tak Airport. The skyscraper is 207 m tall and was opened on 28 September 2023 including an entrance into Kai Tak station via Entrance C. It is a mixed-use building that includes office and commercial space. The lower floors of the building comprise a 700,000 sq. ft. shopping mall, simply known as Airside. The mall contains a cinema and an indoor surfing venue.

== See also ==
- List of tallest buildings in Hong Kong
