= Lemon Jelly =

British electronic music duo

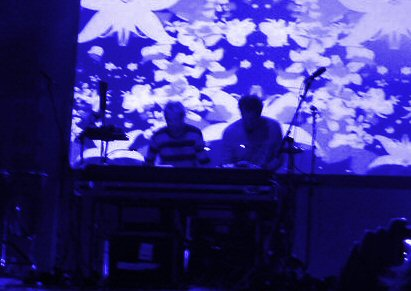
- Lemon Jelly, performing at De Montfort Hall on 13 August 2005

Background information
- Origin: London, England
- Genres: Electronic, trip hop, downtempo
- Years active: 1998–2008
- Labels: Impotent Fury, XL Recordings
- Past members: Fred Deakin; Nick Franglen

Lemon Jelly are a British electronic music duo from London that formed in 1998 and went on hiatus starting in 2008. Since its inception, the band members have always been Fred Deakin and Nick Franglen. Lemon Jelly has been nominated for awards like the Mercury Music Prize and BRIT Awards. The bright colourful artwork featured in the albums and music videos, and the Lemon Jelly typeface, became part of the "brand".

Deakin and Franglen briefly met in north London as teenagers and became friends before going their separate ways: Deakin became a DJ and co-founded Airside studios; Franglen became a studio programmer. The two became reacquainted in 1998 and created the group Lemon Jelly.

Lemon Jelly released three critically acclaimed EPs (1998, 1999, and 2000), securing them a record deal with XL Recordings in 2000. The band subsequently released three full-length albums before going on hiatus in 2008.

== History ==
=== Origins (1998–2001) ===
Deakin and Franglen grew up with the same group of friends, although the two were not truly acquainted with one another. The two eventually became friends but went their separate ways not long after. Deakin moved to Edinburgh for 10 years and became a DJ and co-founder of Airside, a graphic arts company. Franglen gave up his job as a landscape gardener to become a studio programmer; he would eventually work with Primal Scream, Björk, and Pulp. The two periodically bumped into each other at 23 Skidoo concerts. They once again formed a friendship, and bonded over a mutual appreciation for rock music – Deakin cites XTC and A Certain Ratio as personal favourites – and eventually dance music.

The two began recording under the name "Lemon Jelly", which, according to Deakin, comes from an incident when Franglen came into Deakin's kitchen and said "It smells like lemon jelly in here."

From 1998 to 2000, Franglen and Deakin released three limited-circulation EPs: The Bath (1998), The Yellow (1999), and The Midnight (2000), on their own label, Impotent Fury. The EPs were a critical success, and led to the duo being signed to XL Recordings. Franglen and Deakin then collected their three limited-edition EPs into a widely released album in 2000, Lemonjelly.ky.

After the release of the album, Lemon Jelly licensed songs for advertising and incidental music. Music from In the Bath, "A Tune for Jack", was featured in an episode of CSI: Miami, and "The Staunton Lick", from The Yellow, was used during the final scene of the British sitcom Spaced.

=== Lost Horizons (2002–2004) ===
Their second album (and self-proclaimed first studio album), Lost Horizons, was released in 2002, and was another success. The album featured the singles "Space Walk" and "Nice Weather for Ducks" and was nominated for the 2003 Mercury Music Prize and a BRIT Award for the now defunct "Best Dance Act" category in 2004.

A number of their tracks have been used by the BBC and other British broadcasters for trailers and incidental music, including "Nice Weather for Ducks", featuring an impersonation of John Langstaff, and "Ramblin' Man".

In September 2007, "Space Walk" was used in an American advertisement, "Through the Eyes of a Cat", for Friskies cat food. The song "Experiment No. 6" was used for a BBC trailer for a catch-up marathon of the hit TV show Heroes. More recently, the track "Space Walk" was used in the United States for a 2009 Cadillac television campaign.

"The Curse of Ka'Zar" was used in Turner Classic Movies' 31 Days of Oscar advertisements, played in a montage (occasionally aired with alternative music by Imogen Heap) used for filler and in information about the film about to air prior to its actual airing.

It is confirmed by film director, Simón Harker, that the film How I Survived to High School 3, will use two songs as a non-licensed background soundtrack on the movie.

In 2003, the BBC announced that Lemon Jelly would be contributing to a remix album based on the music and sound effects of the television programme Doctor Who as part of the 40th anniversary celebration of the series. This project was abandoned, however, owing partly to the announcement of the 2005 revival of the series.

=== '64–'95 (2005–2007) ===
Their most recent album, 2005's '64–'95, featured a sticker to warn listeners that "This is our new album. It's not like our old album." The title comes from the fact that each track features samples drawn from a single year between 1964 and 1995. It contains a track (Track 10 – "'64 – Go") featuring a vocal performance by William Shatner, with whom they collaborated for a track on his album Has Been. The album was complemented by the release of a DVD under the same title, with each of the album's audio tracks accompanied with colourful visuals executed mostly in 2D and 3D animation. Some of these visuals are progressive and would work as stand-alone music videos, while others are more repetitious, ever-changing variations of a given visual theme. The audio on the DVD is available as both standard stereo as well as 5.1 surround sound (5.1 audio mixed by Franglen and Dom Morley). The visuals were created by the Airside design studios. Telstraclear later sampled "'93 (Don't Stop Now)" in their 'Hello World' campaign of 2006.

In late 2005, Franglen did remixes of Coldcut's "Man in a Garage", and of the original The Sims 2 and its expansion pack The Sims 2: University Buy/Build Mode soundtracks for another expansion pack for The Sims 2, The Sims 2 Nightlife. In 2006 Franglen produced Badly Drawn Boy's studio album Born in the U.K. and in 2007, Deakin released an eclectic three-volume mix album "The Triptych".

=== On hiatus (2008–present) ===
The duo announced Lemon Jelly would be taking an indefinite hiatus as of 2008. Deakin released the news on their forum, also stating that whilst there was a possibility the two would work together again, they would be pursuing solo careers for the time being. Franglen stated on the forum that the two are still good friends and plan to work together again in the future. In 2011, Deakin formed a collaboration with Robin Jones of The Beta Band, called Flashman, and released their debut album To The Victor – The Spoils!. Up to mid-July 2015 their website stated that they were "Not dead, but sleeping" but the domain name was purchased by an independent web developer who revived the website with a memoir of all the albums and EPs the duo released, with a message stating that Deakin or Franglen could contact him to reclaim the domain.

In a 2020 interview with Big Issue North, Fred Deakin stated “My feeling is that it’s probably done, if I’m being honest, which makes me a little sad because I would love there to be more Jelly and I think Nick feels very similar. We have talked about it in the past, but our schedules never quite seem to align… I would never say never, but if I was a betting man I wouldn’t put any money on it.”

== Style ==
=== Live performances ===
In 2003, Lemon Jelly performed a number of shows across the UK and Ireland. Instead of having opening acts, the duo had set up a giant game of Bingo, presided over by Death and played by members of the audience. Entrance to one of their shows was by wearing a limited edition red or yellow coloured T-shirt which was sent in the post, instead of a physical ticket. In other shows, support was provided by Don Partridge – a traditional one man band – whilst "Jelly Helpers" distributed sweets to the crowd. They also played a Saturday morning gig called "Jelly Tots" as a charitable event for children. In between sets, classic British children's TV programmes were played over a projection screen, and the event featured bouncy castles, clowns and hundreds of balloons.

In July 2004, Lemon Jelly played at Somerset House. They have performed headlining sets at Glastonbury Festival, V Festival, Reading Festival and The Big Chill amongst others.

== Visual arts ==
Many of the band's releases and videos are designed by Deakin's Airside studios.

=== Music videos ===
The album '64–'95 was released simultaneously as a DVD featuring animated videos for each track.

=== Album artwork ===
Their packaging is designed by Deakin's Airside studios. The bright colours and graphic elements, together with the Lemon Jelly typeface, contribute to the Lemon Jelly "brand". Their first three EPs were released on 10" vinyl in hand-screenprinted sleeves and now trade on eBay for large sums of money. Other interesting sleeves included Soft/Rock, an unofficial release pressed on pale blue 7" vinyl in a denim sleeve that also contained a condom, and Rolled/Oats, another unofficial release pressed as a gold picture disc in a hessian bag.

== Discography ==
=== Albums ===
Title	Album details	Peak chart positions			Certifications (sales thresholds)
Title	Album details	UK	AUS	US Elec.	Certifications (sales thresholds)
Lemonjelly.ky^{[A]}	Released: 23 October 2000; Label: XL (IFXLCD 139); Format: CD, LP	—	—	—	BPI: Silver
Lost Horizons	Released: 8 October 2002; Label: XL (IFXLCD 160); Format: CD, LP	20	—	24	BPI: Gold
'64–'95	Released: 31 January 2005; Label: XL (IFXLCD 182X); Format: CD, LP	17	97	8	BPI: Silver

=== EPs ===
- The Bath (1998)
- The Yellow (1999)
- The Midnight (2000)

=== Singles ===
Title	Year	Peak chart positions	Album
Title	Year	UK	Album
"Soft/Rock"^{[B]}	2001	—	N/A
"Space Walk"	2002	36	Lost Horizons
"Nice Weather for Ducks"	2003	16	Lost Horizons
"Rolled/Oats"^{[B]}	2003	—	N/A
"Stay with You"	2004	31	'64–'95
"The Shouty Track"	2005	21	'64–'95
"Make Things Right"	2005	33	'64–'95
"—" denotes singles that did not chart.

Notes

- A Lemonjelly.ky is a compilation of the band's first three EPs. For completeness, it is listed under "albums".
- B "Soft/Rock" and "Rolled/Oats" were not released under the Lemon Jelly name, but the musical style and distinctive cover artwork style made it apparent as to the source of the release. "Soft" and "Rolled" were later released as Lemon Jelly B-Sides.
