= Nick Franglen =

British musician (born 1965)

Nick Franglen (born 1965) is a British musician, record producer and installation artist. He is best known as a founding member of the electronic music duo Lemon Jelly.

== Music composition and production ==
A classically trained musician and multi-instrumentalist, during the 1990s Franglen played keyboards, electronic instruments and drum programming on studio recordings with Björk, Primal Scream, Hole, Pulp and Blur, amongst others. As well as co-writing all of Lemon Jelly's music, he produced their first self-released recordings in 1997, and went on to produce all three Lemon Jelly albums released on XL Recordings. He also has produced records for other musicians, including John Cale, Badly Drawn Boy, Mark Fry and Colin MacIntyre. He has remixed tracks for Coldcut and Mark Mothersbaugh of Devo.

Franglen has composed extensively for film and television, including the music for the BBC series Restoration, and the BAFTA nominated animated film Soho Square. In 2007, he collaborated with his Lemon Jelly partner Fred Deakin to compose the music for Inventions of the Abstract, an hour-long film of abstract dynamic graphics. Franglen and Deakin performed this music live at the London Imax cinema in London as part of the 2007 Optronica Festival.

== Live performance ==
Franglen developed a lasting connection with John Cale following his production of Cale's album Hobo Sapiens, and has performed live with him many times. In 2003, he accompanied Cale on Later... with Jools Holland, playing a hand pumped harmonium. In 2005 he played keyboards and electronics with Cale and Flea of Red Hot Chili Peppers at the Royal Festival Hall at Patti Smith's Meltdown Festival. In 2010, Franglen performed with Cale at the Melbourne Festival 2010, and mixed the live sound of Cale's Venice Biennale artwork, Dark Days, when this was installed in Essen for RUHR.2010.

Since 2008, Franglen has been the musical director of Nico - A Life Along the Borderline, the John Cale curated tribute shows to the singer Nico, featuring performances by a variety of artists including Mark Lanegan, Mark Linkous, Mercury Rev, Lisa Gerrard, Peter Murphy, Guillemots, Laetitia Sadier and Joan As Policewoman in shows in London, Ferrara, Wroclaw and Rome.

In 2011, Franglen acted as musical director for psychedelic folk musician Mark Fry, performing at a concert in London featuring members of Mercury Rev, Super Furry Animals, and Tunng.

Since 2007, Franglen has collaborated with Charles Casey of Akasha in guitar-based electronic duo Blacksand, releasing the album Barn in March 2008. Blacksand are notable for the unusual locations in which they perform their extended live improvisations, which include down a mine, inside a submarine and inside Pyestock, an abandoned scientific testing facility.

== Installation art ==
Franglen's installations investigate the relationship between people and unusual spaces, an interest that he says developed from his fascination with the locations in which Blacksand performed.

On 2 September 2010, Franglen played a theremin under London Bridge for 24 hours for his Hymn to London Bridge, a collaboration with the thousands of commuters who cross the bridge each day.

On 21 June 2011, he performed Hymn to the Manhattan Bridge, where he played theremin in The Archway under the Manhattan Bridge for 24 hours as part of Make Music New York.

In November 2011, he created Hive, a sound art installation featuring 50 radios tuned to different stations, running for 24 hours inside the World War II gunnery training dome at Langham, Norfolk, UK.

Between January and July 2012, he created Legacy, an extensive solo installation inside an abandoned mill building in the London Docklands. A reference to the London 2012 Olympics, part of the installation was to create an allotment growing seeds that had been intended for the Manor Garden Allotments, that were destroyed in the making of the London Olympic Park.
