= List of schools in Wong Tai Sin District =

This is a list of schools in Wong Tai Sin District, Hong Kong.

== Secondary schools ==
Government

- Lung Cheung Government Secondary School

Aided

- Buddhist Hung Sean Chau Memorial College (佛教孔仙洲紀念中學)
- CCC Heep Woh College (中華基督教會協和書院)
- CCC Kei Heep Secondary School (中華基督教會基協中學)
- CCC Rotary Secondary School (中華基督教會扶輪中學)
- Chi Lin Buddhist Secondary School (佛教志蓮中學)
- Choi Hung Estate Catholic Secondary School (彩虹邨天主教英文中學)
- Ho Lap College (sponsored by Sik Sik Yuen) (可立中學（嗇色園主辦）)
- Kit Sam Lam Bing Yim Secondary School (潔心林炳炎中學)
- Lee Kau Yan Memorial School (李求恩紀念中學)
- Lok Sin Tong Wong Chung Ming Secondary School (樂善堂王仲銘中學)
- Lok Sin Tong Yu Kan Hing Secondary School (樂善堂余近卿中學)
- Ng Wah Catholic Secondary School (天主教伍華中學)
- Our Lady's College (聖母書院)
- PHC Wing Kwong College (五旬節聖潔會永光書院)
- PLK Celine Ho Yam Tong College] (保良局何蔭棠中學)
- PLK No. 1 WH Cheung College (保良局第一張永慶中學)
- Salvation Army William Booth Secondary School (救世軍卜維廉中學)
- Sheng Kung Hui St Benedict's School (聖公會聖本德中學)
- St Bonaventure College & High School (聖文德書院)
- Stewards Pooi Tun Secondary School (香港神託會培敦中學)
- Tak Oi Secondary School (德愛中學)

Direct Subsidy Scheme

- Good Hope School (德望學校)

Private

- International Christian Quality Music Secondary and Primary School (國際基督教優質音樂中學暨小學)

== Primary schools ==
Government

- Wong Tai Sin Government Primary School (黃大仙官立小學)

Aided

- Baptist Rainbow Primary School (浸信會天虹小學)
- Bishop Ford Memorial School (福德學校)
- Bishop Walsh Primary School (華德學校)
- Canossa Primary School (嘉諾撒小學)
- Canossa Primary School (San Po Kong) (嘉諾撒小學（新蒲崗）)
- CCC Kei Tsz Primary School (中華基督教會基慈小學)
- CCC Kei Wa Primary School (中華基督教會基華小學)
- Choi Wan St Joseph's Primary School (彩雲聖若瑟小學)
- Chun Tok School (真鐸學校)
- Confucian Tai Shing Primary School (孔教學院大成小學)
- Ho Lap Primary School (sponsored by Sik Sik Yuen) (嗇色園主辦可立小學)
- Islamic Dharwood Pau Memorial Primary School (伊斯蘭鮑伯濤紀念小學)
- Ng Wah Catholic Primary School (天主教伍華小學)
- PLK Grandmont Primary School (保良局錦泰小學)
- PLK Mrs Chan Nam Chong Memorial Primary School (保良局陳南昌夫人小學)
- Po Yan Oblate Primary School (獻主會溥仁小學)
- Price Memorial Catholic Primary School (天主教博智小學)
- SKH Kei Tak Primary School (聖公會基德小學)
- St Bonaventure Catholic Primary School (聖文德天主教小學)
- St Patrick's Catholic Primary School (Po Kong Village Road) (聖博德天主教小學（蒲崗村道）)
- St Patrick's School (聖博德學校)
- Tsz Wan Shan Catholic Primary School (慈雲山天主教小學)
- TWS St Bonaventure Catholic Primary School (慈雲山聖文德天主教小學)
- Wong Tai Sin Catholic Primary School (黃大仙天主教小學)

Private

- Assembly of God St. Hilary's College (神召會德萃書院)
- Good Hope Primary School cum Kindergarten (德望小學暨幼稚園)
- International Christian Quality Music Secondary & Primary School (國際基督教優質音樂中學暨小學)
- Our Lady's Primary School (聖母小學)

== Special schools ==
Aided

- Caritas Pelletier School (明愛培立學校)
- Hong Kong Red Cross Margaret Trench School (香港紅十字會瑪嘉烈戴麟趾學校)
- Rhenish Church Grace School (禮賢會恩慈學校)
