= Choi Hung Road =

Street in Hong Kong

- Chinese: 彩虹道
Transcriptions
Standard Mandarin
- Hanyu Pinyin: Cǎihóng Dào
Yue: Cantonese
- Jyutping: coi2 hung4 dou6

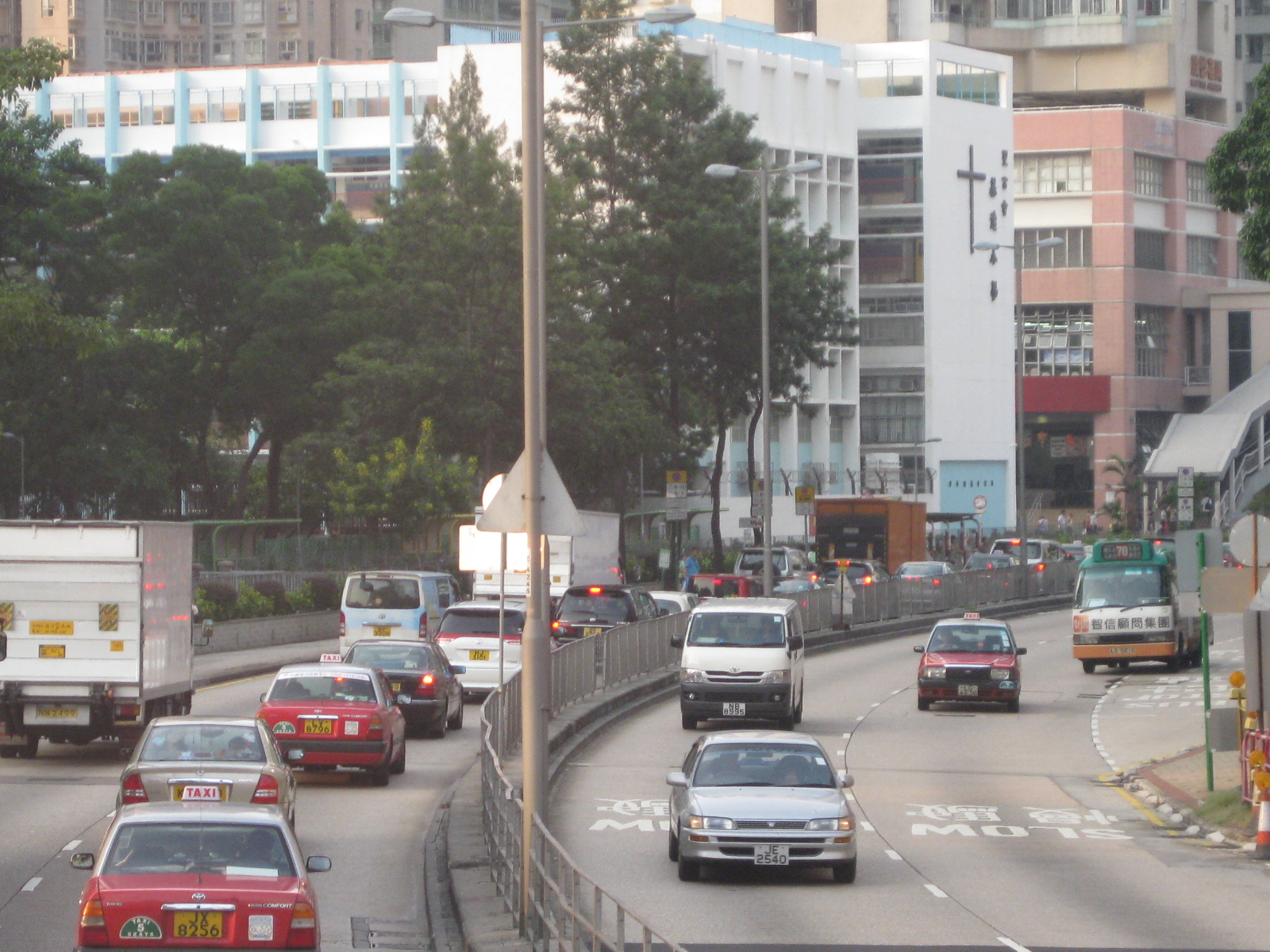
Choi Hung Road

Choi Hung Road (Chinese: 彩虹道) is a road located in the Wong Tai Sin District, Kowloon of Hong Kong. It was first opened to the public in the 1920s as a part of Clear Water Bay Road, yet it was split from the road and named after the Choi Hung Estate in 1963.

Nowadays the road has four lanes for traffic in both ways. Its starting point is at the intersection with Prince Edward Road and it ends at the roundabout at Choi Hung Estate. Choi Hung Road mainly passes through densely populated residential areas, industrial buildings and leisure areas.

== Notable places along the road ==
- Ng Wah Catholic Secondary School (天主教伍華中學)
- Kai Tak Garden (啟德花園))
- Choi Hung Road Playground (彩虹道遊樂場)
- Rhythm Garden (采頤花園)

== See also ==
- List of streets and roads in Hong Kong
- San Po Kong
