= Brian Chow =

- 周國豐
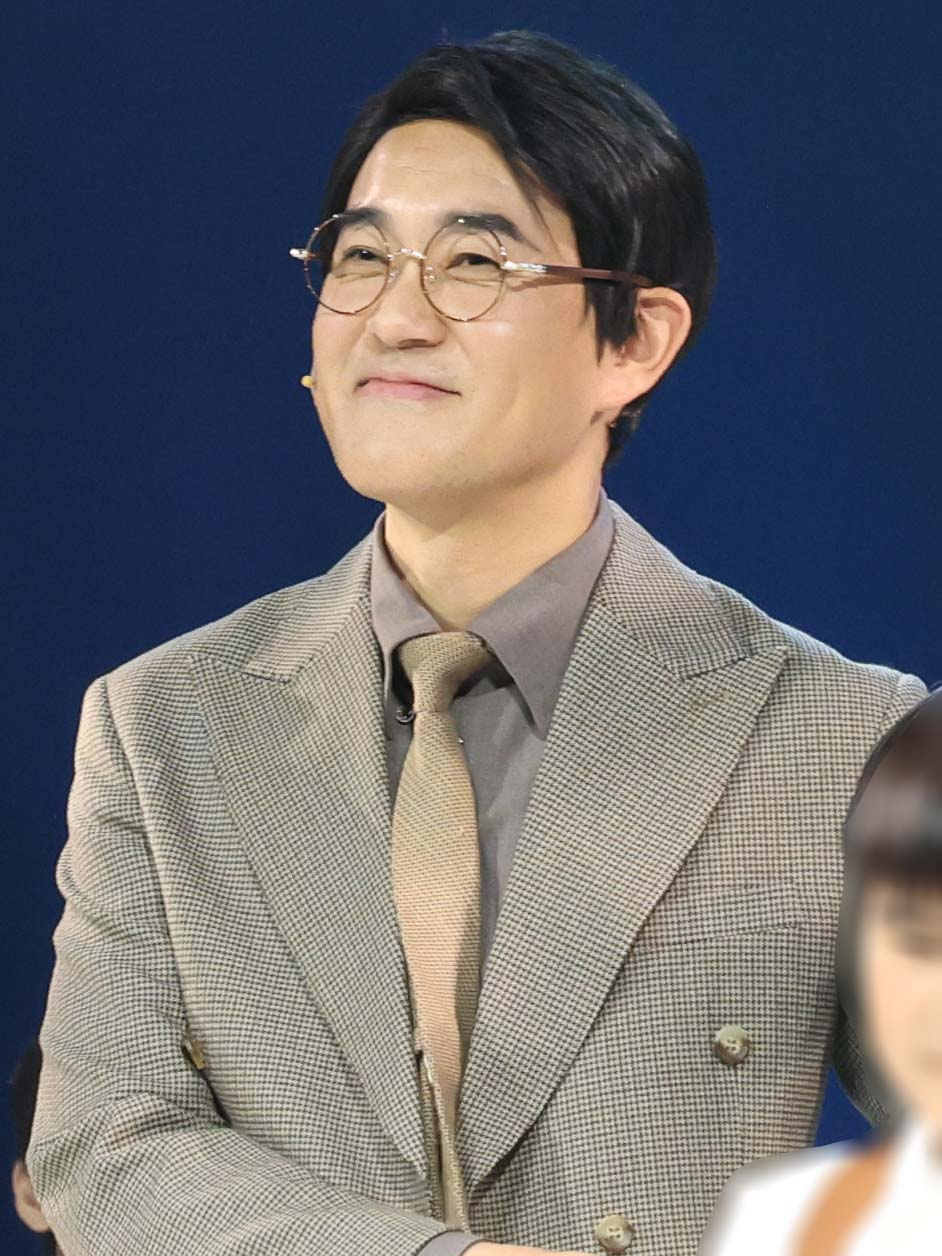
- Born: April 27, 1970 (age 56); Kowloon City, British Hong Kong
- Education: Po Yan Oblate Primary School; Choi Hung Estate Catholic Secondary School; Munsang College

Brian Chow Kwok-fung (Chinese: 周國豐, born April 27, 1970) is a former Hong Kong disc jockey and television presenter. He was a child star in the 1980s and performed on Educational Television. He was formerly Director of Radio Hong Kong's Radio 2 and Mandarin Channel, and Director of Radio and Program Planning. Before leaving in 2021, he was Assistant Director of Broadcasting (Radio and Program Planning) at RTHK. He took up the position of Deputy Director-General (Corporate Planning, Education and Information Technology) at Pok Oi Hospital in May 2023.

== Background ==
=== Early life ===
Chow is from Chaozhou. He has 3 brothers and 1 sister (the second brother is Chau Kan-choi, a famous Chinese tutor). He was born in Kowloon City in 1970. He lived in an old building on South Wall Road in Kowloon City in his early years; later he moved to Tung Tau Estate and graduated from the afternoon class of Po Yan Oblate Primary School in 1982. He attended Choi Hung Estate Catholic Secondary School during his secondary school years (Form 5, 1987), later transferring to Munsang College to complete his studies (Form 7, 1989). He was a member of the choir of Po Yan Oblate Primary School; after transferring to Munsang College, a teacher encouraged him to become a member of the school swimming team. He was an excellent student at school and won the 1983 Hong Kong Open Children's Storytelling Competition co-organized by Radio Television Hong Kong and the Boys' and Girls' Clubs Association of Hong Kong. He also participated in the school singing competition with classmates, and represented the school in television programs such as "Reviewing the Past and Learning the New" and "Educational Television" performances.

After graduating from pre-university studies, lacking ambition and simply wanting to obtain a university degree without spending much time studying, he completed a Diploma in Business Management at Hong Kong Polytechnic Institute. Prior to this, he had already explored a career as a broadcaster through the "Transnational Amateur DJ Competition" (the champion of that year was Wayne Kwok Wai-On, and although their music program styles were similar, they never had the opportunity to collaborate). He also won second place in the 1989 Hong Kong Students' Summer Singing Contest organized by the Overseas Chinese Daily (and participated in the same competition again in 1990). In addition, he won the championship in the Hong Kong Karaoke Competition.

== Career Development ==
Starting in 1989, Chow passed an interview with Cheung Man-sun and worked as a part-time DJ at Radio Television Hong Kong. He won the silver medal in the newcomer singing competition at the 1991 Shanghai Asian Music Festival. In the same year, he participated in the TVB Global Chinese New Talent Singing Contest (10th edition) with "Half Moon Serenade", but was eliminated from the top 10. He started his career in broadcasting as a host for "Chinese Song Collection", but felt he could not shake his recitation-style speaking and that his personality was not suited to the industry, so he considered changing careers. He then applied for management trainee positions at an airline and bank, ultimately being persuaded to stay by Simon Ngai Ping-long due to the attractive salary increase. He finally became a full-time employee of RTHK in 1998.

During his time at the company, he was assigned by Cheung Man-san and Simon Ngai Ping-long to oversee singer coordination projects, requiring him to maintain close contact with record companies. He assisted in organizing the Global Chinese Music Chart Awards Concert and also served as the chief planner and artist liaison for the [Top Ten Chinese Gold Songs Awards Concert] for many years. In the early 2000s, he was promoted to program director of RTHK Radio 2. Because of his frequent relationships with entertainment companies, he was mistakenly accused by a weekly magazine in 2001 of having frequent contact with record company executives. Afterwards, he hosted a radio program called "Kwok Fung Kwok Fung" to introduce the mainland Chinese music scene, and invited Hins Cheung to be his co-host. In 2006, he took charge of behind-the-scenes administrative work, and successively served as the director of RTHK Radio 2, the deputy director/director of RTHK Mandarin Channel, and the director of radio, new media and program collaboration. By the end of the 2010s, Chow Kwok-fung had been promoted to Director of Radio Television Hong Kong (RTHK). In September 2020, he took over as Assistant Director of Broadcasting (Radio and Program Planning) at Radio Television Hong Kong (RTHK).

He officially resigned on July 9.
