= Choi Hung Road Playground =

Park in Kowloon, Hong Kong

Coordinates: 22.338104°N 114.196975°E

- Traditional Chinese: 彩虹道遊樂場
- Simplified Chinese: 彩虹道游乐场
Transcriptions
Standard Mandarin
- Hanyu Pinyin: Cǎihóng Dào Yóulèchǎng
Yue: Cantonese
- Jyutping: coi2 hung4 dou6 jau4 lok6 coeng4

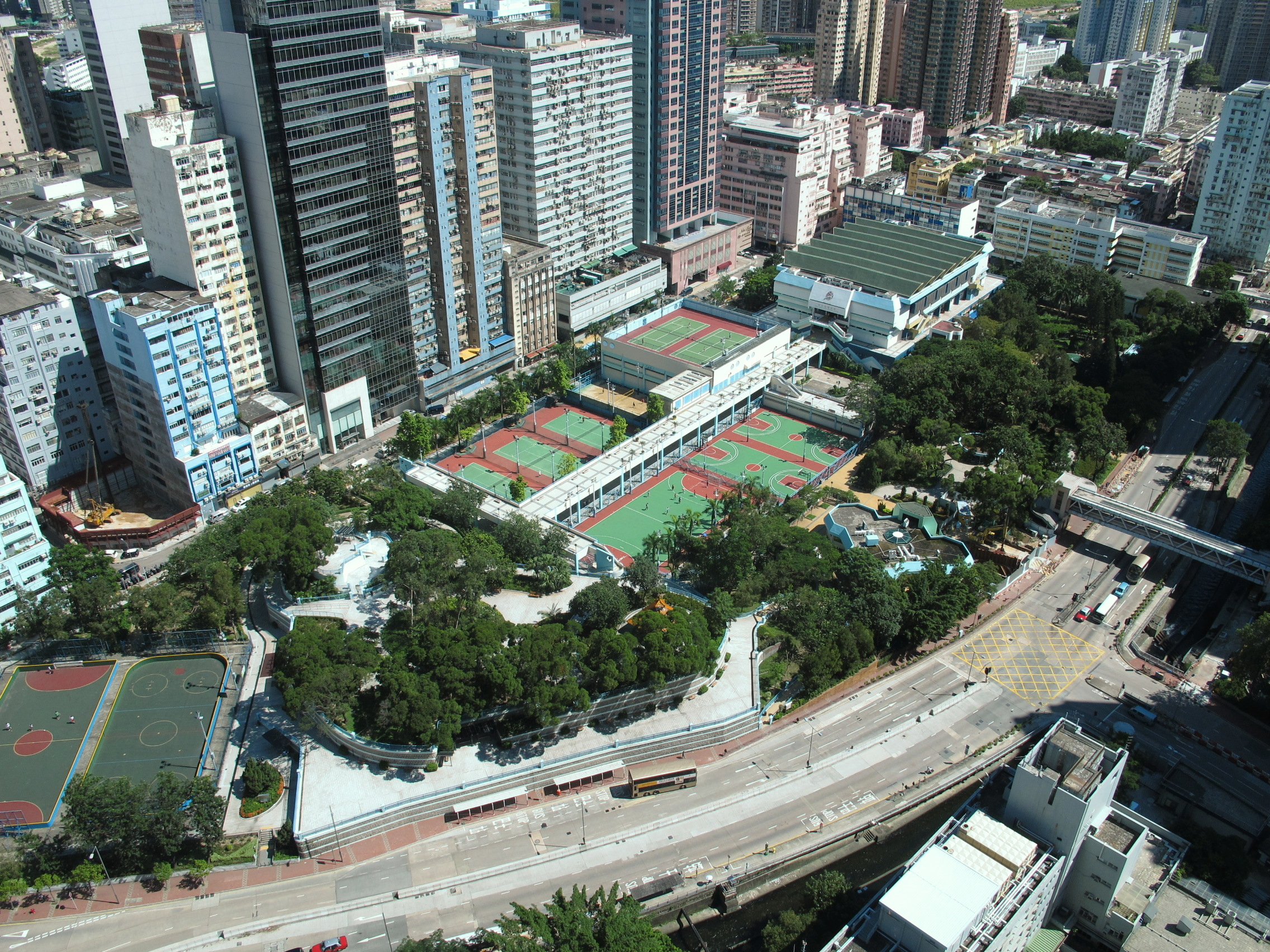
Choi Hung Road Playground

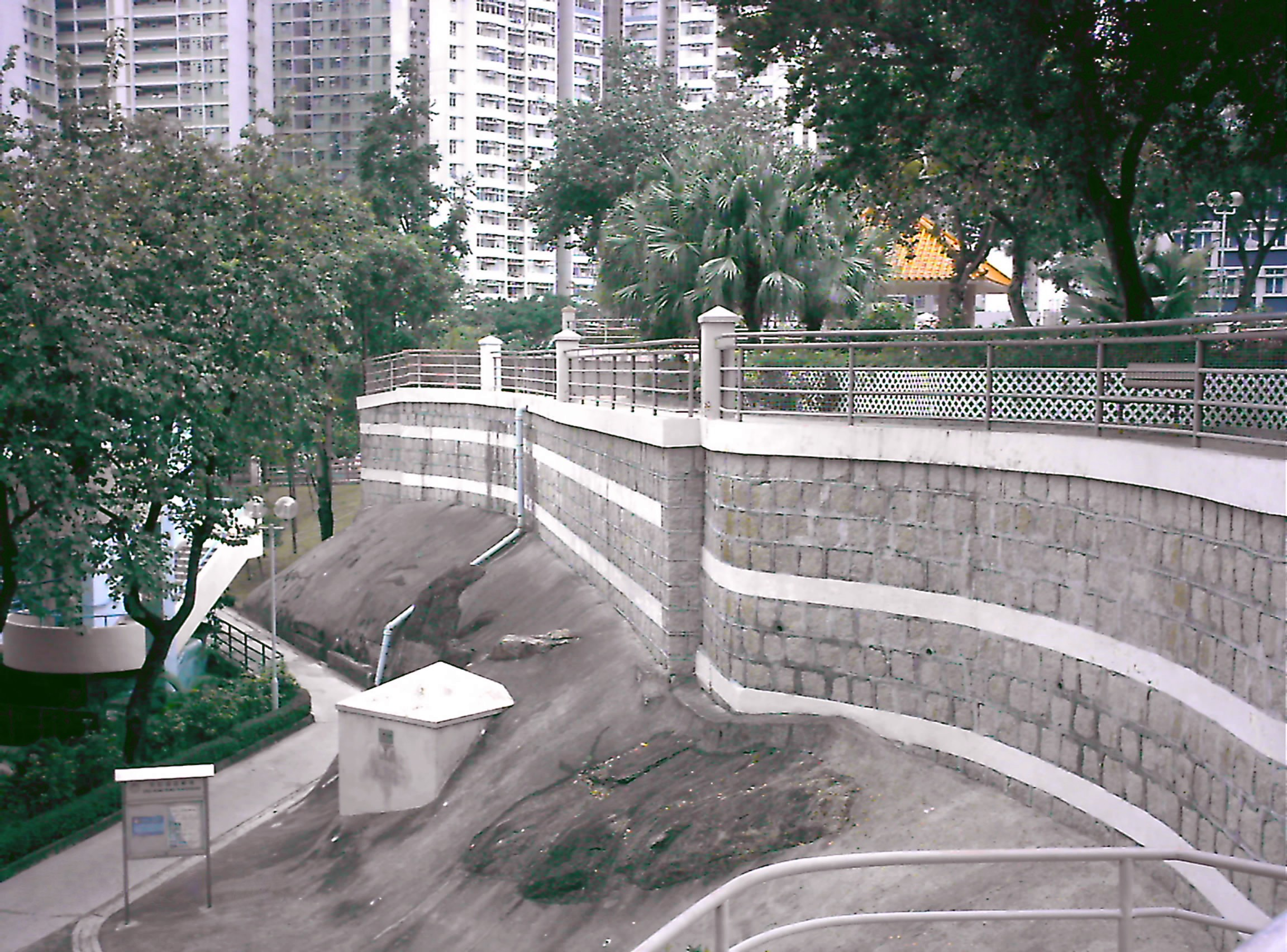
Remnants of Kai Tak Amusement Park in Choi Hung Road Playground

Choi Hung Road Playground (Chinese: 彩虹道遊樂場) is located in Choi Hung Road, San Po Kong, Wong Tai Sin District, Kowloon, Hong Kong. The playground is managed by the Leisure and Cultural Services Department of Hong Kong.

== History ==
Choi Hung Road Playground was built by the Urban Council and opened on 14 July 1964 by Urban Councillor Elsie Elliott. The park was later expanded to occupy the site formerly occupied by the adjacent Kai Tak Amusement Park. In the 1980s, a new gymnasium, market and cooking centre were built.

== Facilities ==
- Hockey stadium
- Soccer field
- Park pavilion
- Peak park
- Observation deck
- Tennis court
- Handball court
- Basketball court
- Badminton centre
- Rooftop tennis court
- Gymnasium
- Market
- Cooking centre
- Chess benches
- Elderly fitness station
- Fountain

== Opening hours ==
The park is opened to the general public from 7:00am to 11:00pm

== Public transport ==
Choi Hung Road Park is within 10 minutes of walking distance from the Wong Tai Sin station and the Diamond Hill station of the MTR. One can also go to Choi Hung Road Park by boarding a bus or minibus which passes by Choi Hung Road.
