= San Po Kong =

Industrial and residential area of Hong Kong

Coordinates: 22.33547°N 114.19837°E

- Traditional Chinese: 新蒲崗
- Simplified Chinese: 新蒲岗
- Cantonese Yale: sān pòuh gōng
Transcriptions
Standard Mandarin
- Hanyu Pinyin: Xīn Pú Gǎng
Yue: Cantonese
- Yale Romanization: sān pòuh gōng
- Jyutping: san1 pou4 gong1

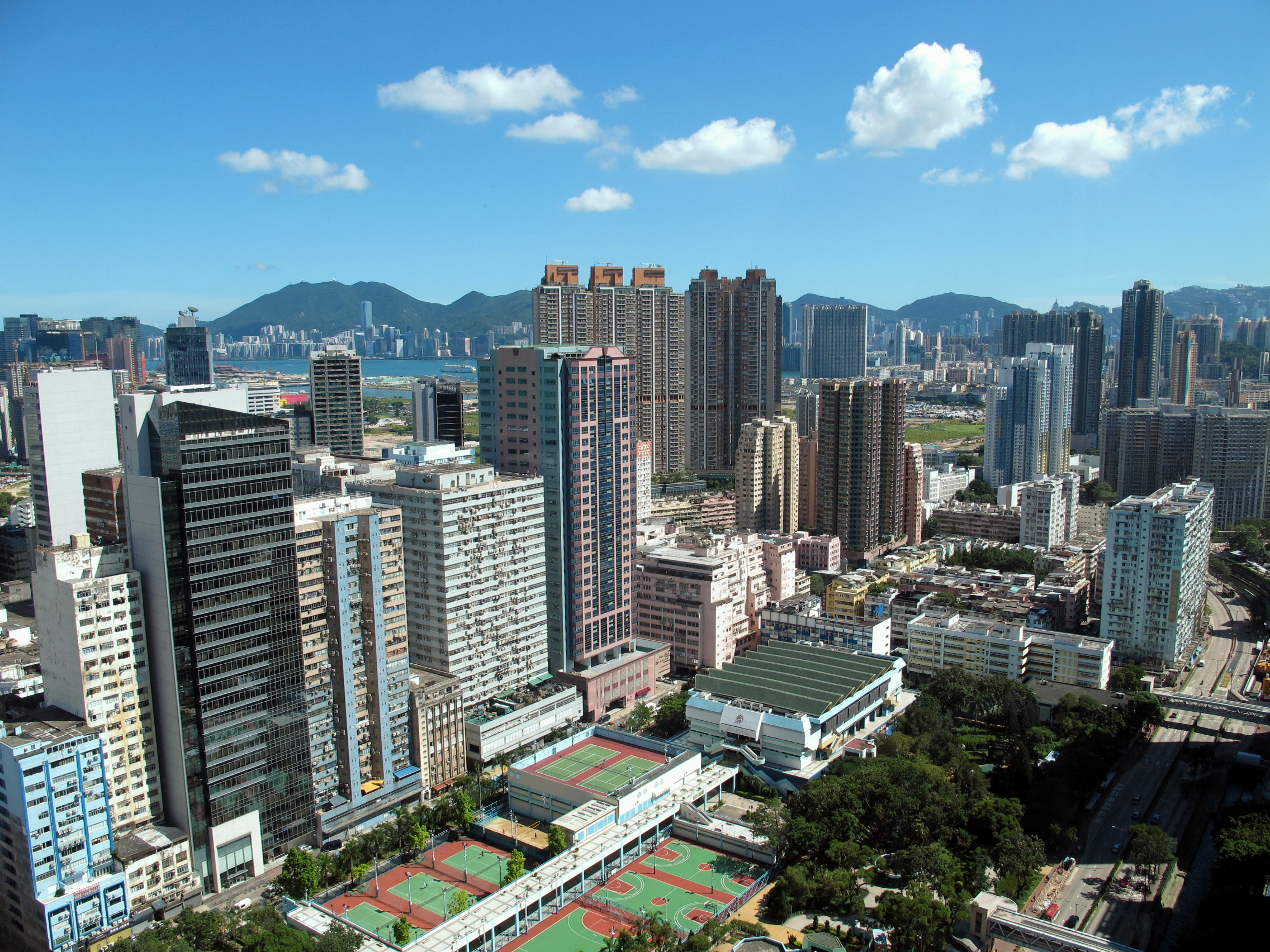
Looking South-west over San Po Kong in July 2012

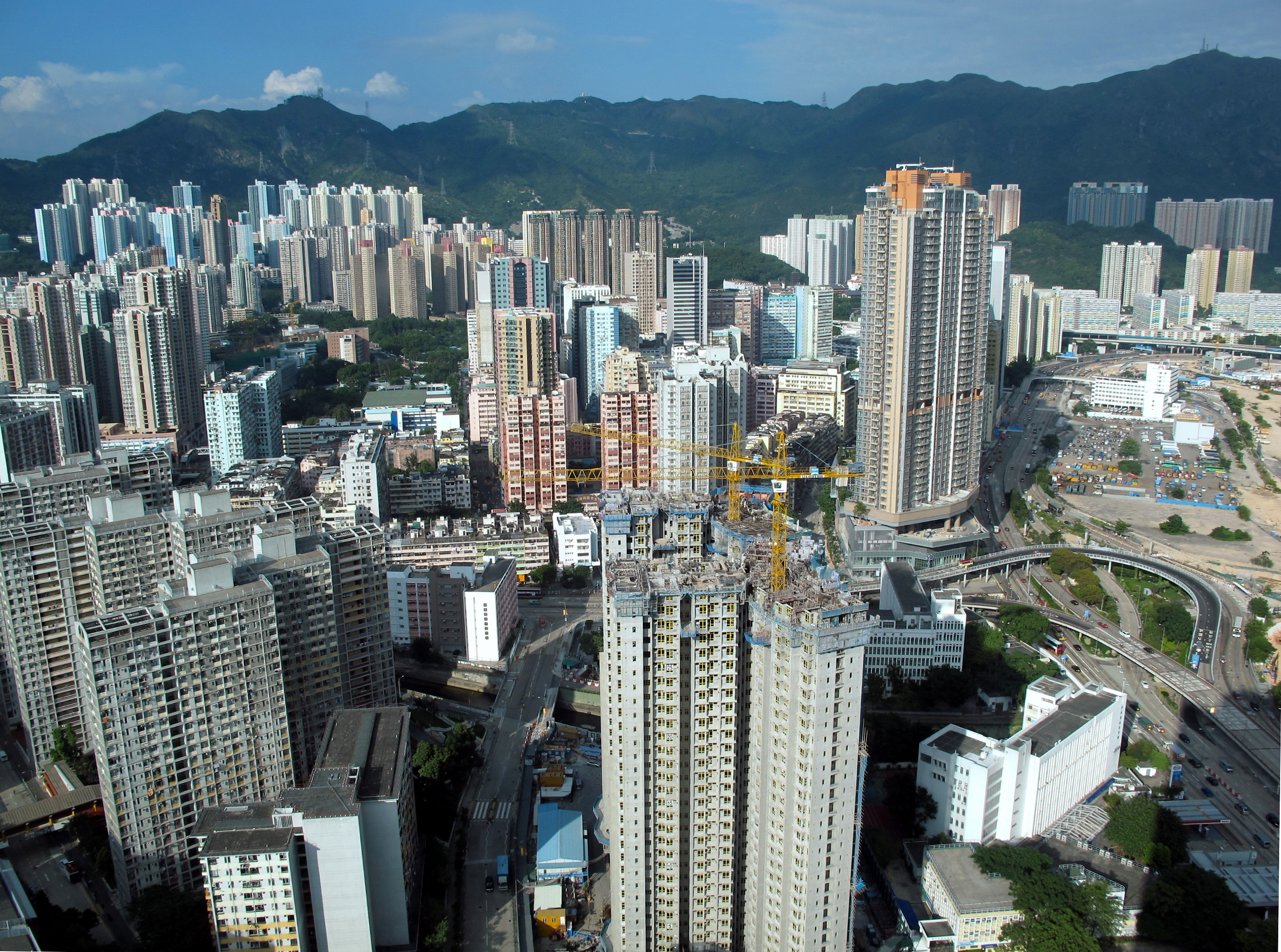
Looking north-east over San Po Kong in October 2010

San Po Kong (Chinese: 新蒲崗; Cantonese Yale: sān pòuh gōng) is an area in New Kowloon in Hong Kong. It is largely industrial and partly residential. Administratively, it belongs to Wong Tai Sin District.

== Location ==
San Po Kong is located south of Wong Tai Sin and Diamond Hill, north of the former Kai Tak International Airport and west of Ngau Chai Wan. The area is bounded by Choi Hung Road and Prince Edward Road East.

== History ==
=== Village ===
San Po Kong was a new village replacing the old Po Kong Village that was destroyed by the Japanese in 1943. The original village consisted of terraced housing and a small forested area along a hill. The hill was partially levelled by the Japanese during the extension of the runway at Kai Tak during World War II. Today the old village hill is now site of the Choi Hung Road Playground. Reminders of the old village lives on with street names and a park (Po Kong Village Road, Po Kong Village Road Park). The current San Po Kong is a post-War residential scheme with mostly public housing blocks.

=== Airport ===
In 1916, the area south of present-day San Po Kong was reclaimed by Ho Kai and Au Tak for a garden estate. The reclamation was completed in two phases in 1920 and 1927. The reclaimed area became known as Kai Tak Bund. The company lacked the capital to complete the project and left part the land unused. The Hong Kong Government decided to buy back the land for the Royal Air Force and a future Kai Tak Aerodrome. In the late 1930s, the airport was significantly expanded to take up the whole of San Po Kong. Clear Water Bay Road, part of the current Choi Hung Road, and a nullah were constructed around the airport. During the Japanese occupation of Hong Kong, more than 20 villages surrounding San Po Kong were demolished for further expansion of the airport.

Part of the previous runway was converted into Tseuk Luk Street in the area, which was deliberately named with a pun on the word "landing" in Cantonese.

=== Industrial area ===
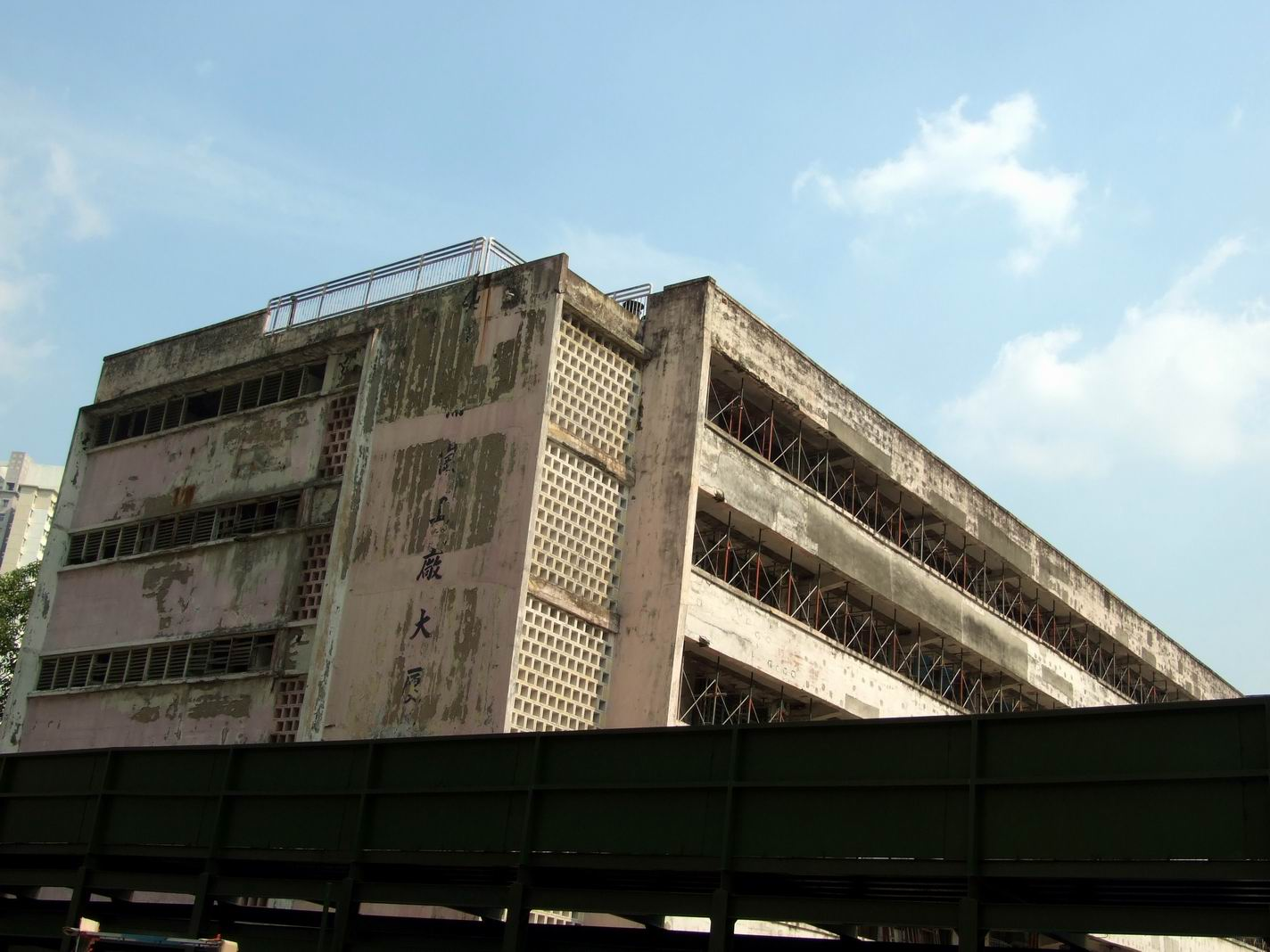
A building of the public San Po Kong Factory Estate, shortly before its demolition in October 2007.

In 1958, the airport was shifted south, out of San Po Kong and into Kowloon Bay. Prince Edward Road East was completed at around this time. San Po Kong became an industrial area, in many high-rise buildings. The government also established the San Po Kong Factory Estate, a factory estate for small manufacturing businesses in the early 1960s.

In May 1967, a labour dispute in a factory making artificial flowers ignited the 1967 riots, which lasted until October. During that period, public bus services were suspended, forcing workers from other areas to commute on foot.

In the 1980s, many of the manufacturing businesses in San Po Kong relocated to China, and the industrial buildings were turned into offices and godowns.

== Features ==
Facilities in San Po Kong include:

- Mikiki, a shopping mall
- Choi Hung Road Playground
- Rhythm Garden, a housing estate
- Ho Lap College
- Ng Wah Catholic Secondary School

== Transport ==
San Po Kong is served by Wong Tai Sin station, Diamond Hill station and Kai Tak station of the MTR.

== Education ==
San Po Kong is in Primary One Admission (POA) School Net 43. Within the school net are multiple aided schools (operated independently but funded with government money) and Wong Tai Sin Government Primary School.

Hong Kong Public Libraries maintains the San Po Kong Public Library in San Po Kong Plaza.

== See also ==
- Kai Tak Development
- Po Kong Village Road Park
