= Lok Sin Tong Yu Kan Hing Secondary School =

Secondary school in Hong Kong

Coordinates: 22.3418°N 114.1851°E

- Traditional Chinese: 樂善堂余近卿中學
- Simplified Chinese: 乐善堂余近卿中学
Transcriptions
Standard Mandarin
- Hanyu Pinyin: Lè Shàn Táng Yú Jìnqīng Zhōngxué
Yue: Cantonese
- Jyutping: lok6 sin6 tong4 jyu4 gan6 hing1 zung1 hok6

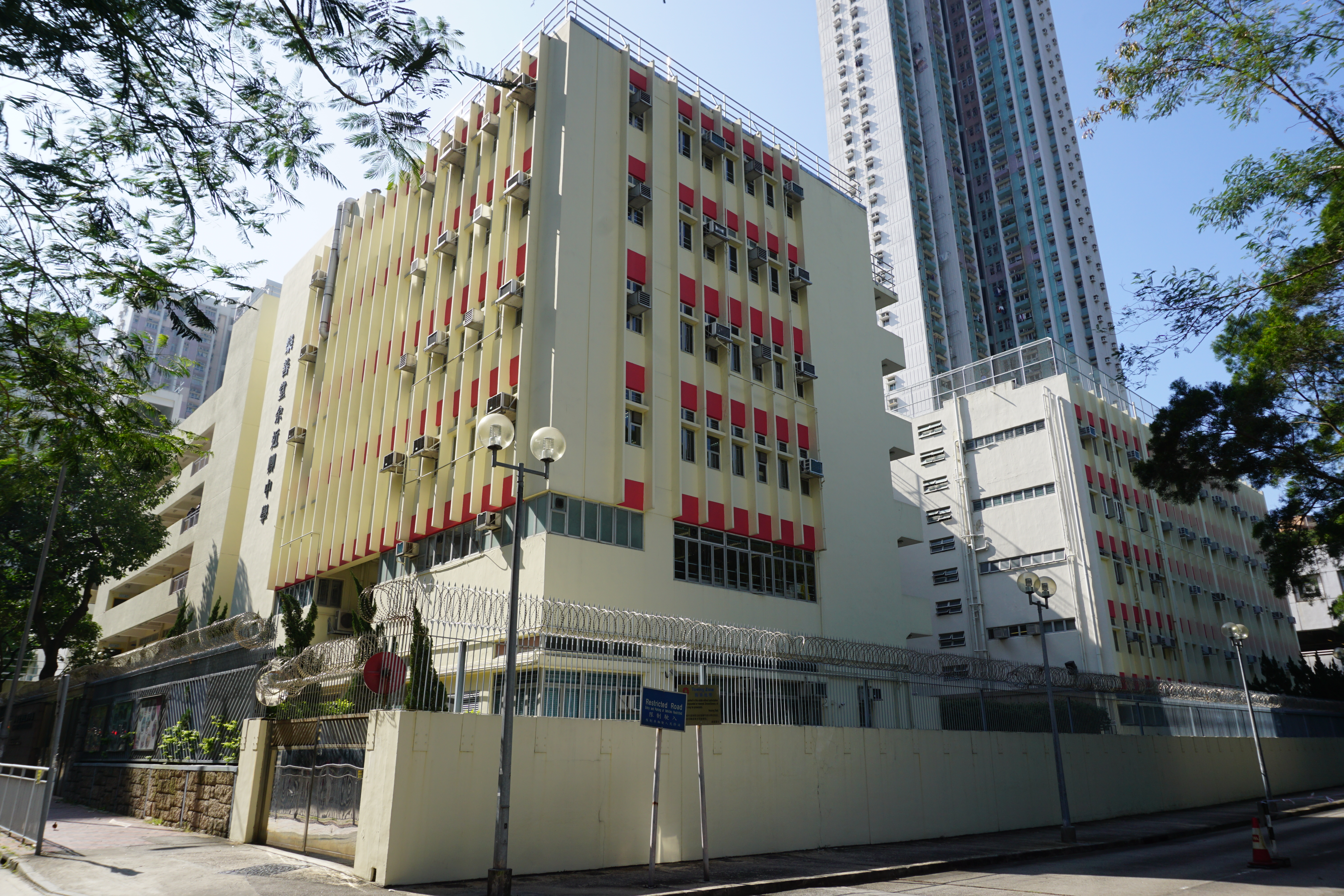
Lok Sin Tong Yu Kan Hing Secondary School.

Lok Sin Tong Yu Kan Hing Secondary School (Chinese: 樂善堂余近卿中學) or Lok Sin Tong Yu Kan Hing School prior to 2004, is a secondary school of Chinese as a media of instruction (CMI) in Wang Tau Hom, New Kowloon, Hong Kong.

== History ==
The school was the first secondary school to be run by Lok Sin Tong and was donated by Mr. Yu Kan Hing, and officially opened by Sir David Clive Crosbie Trench, the Governor of Hong Kong, and John Canning, Secretary of Education on 15 December 1970. The first principal of the school was Dr. LI Sze-Bay, Albert, MBE, BBS, JP (1936–2010), who served the school from 1969 to 2000.

As of October 2020 the current and fourth principal is Lau Chun Hung.

== School's motto ==
The school's motto is the same as that of other Lok Sin Tong schools: Benevolence, Affection, Diligence and Faithfulness (仁愛勤誠).

== See also ==
- The Lok Sin Tong Benevolent Society, Kowloon
