= Wong Tai Sin station =

MTR station in Kowloon, Hong Kong

Wong Tai Sin 黃大仙
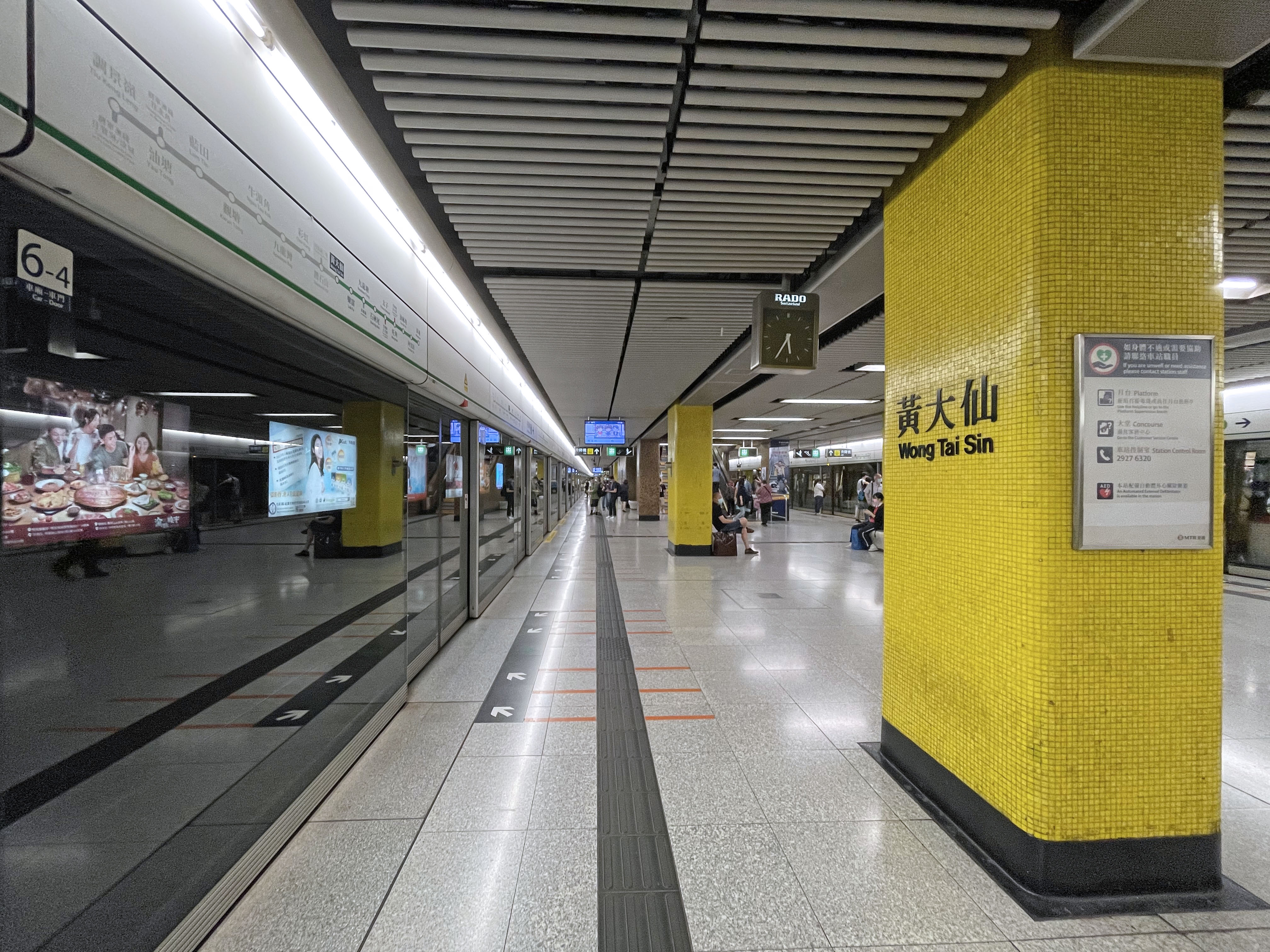
- Platforms 1 and 2 (2021)

Chinese name
- Chinese: 黃大仙
- Cantonese Yale: Wòngdaaihsīn
- Literal meaning: Wong the Great Immortal
Transcriptions
Standard Mandarin
- Hanyu Pinyin: Huángdàxiān
Yue: Cantonese
- Yale Romanization: Wòngdaaihsīn
- Jyutping: wong4daai6sin1

General information
- Location: Lung Cheung Road near Temple Mall, Wong Tai Sin; Wong Tai Sin District, Hong Kong
- Coordinates: 22°20′30″N 114°11′38″E
- System: MTR rapid transit station
- Operator: MTR Corporation
- Line: Kwun Tong line
- Platforms: 2 (1 island platform)
- Tracks: 2
- Connections: Bus, minibus

Construction
- Structure type: Underground
- Platform levels: 1
- Accessible: yes

Other information
- Station code: WTS

History
- Opened: 1 October 1979; 46 years ago
- Former names: Chuk Un

Services
Preceding station	MTR	Following station
Lok Fu towards Whampoa	Kwun Tong line	Diamond Hill towards Tiu Keng Leng
Track layout
Location
- Location within MTR

Wong Tai Sin (Chinese: 黃大仙; Cantonese Yale: Wòngdaaihsīn) is a station on the Hong Kong MTR Kwun Tong line. It is named after the Wong Tai Sin Temple, which is managed by Taoist organisation Sik Sik Yuen.

== Livery ==
The station's livery is yellow to reflect the character "Wong" in Chinese (黃), which means "yellow".

== History ==
Hip Hing Construction Limited won Contract 204 for the station's construction. Wong Tai Sin station opened simultaneously with the Kwun Tong line on 1 October 1979.

== Station layout ==
Platforms 1 and 2 share the same island platform.

G	Ground level	Exits
L1; Concourse	Concourse	Customer service, MTRshops, vending machines
L1; Concourse	Concourse	Hang Seng Bank, automatic teller machines
L2; Platforms	Platform 1	Kwun Tong line towards Tiu Keng Leng (Diamond Hill) →
L2; Platforms	Island platform, doors will open on the right
L2; Platforms	Platform 2	← Kwun Tong line towards Whampoa (Lok Fu)

== Entrances/exits ==
- A/E: Lung Cheung Road (West Exit)
- B1/B2: Lung Cheung Road (East Exit)
- B3: Wong Tai Sin Temple, Temple Mall North
- C1: Ching Tak Street/Lung Cheung Road Junction
- C2: Ching Tak Street
- D1: San Po Kong
- D2: Ching Tak Street, Bus Terminus
- D3: Temple Mall South

== Incidents ==
On 7 September 2023, the station experienced severe flooding due to a torrential rainstorm, causing most of the Kwun Tong Line to be temporarily suspended.

== Gallery ==
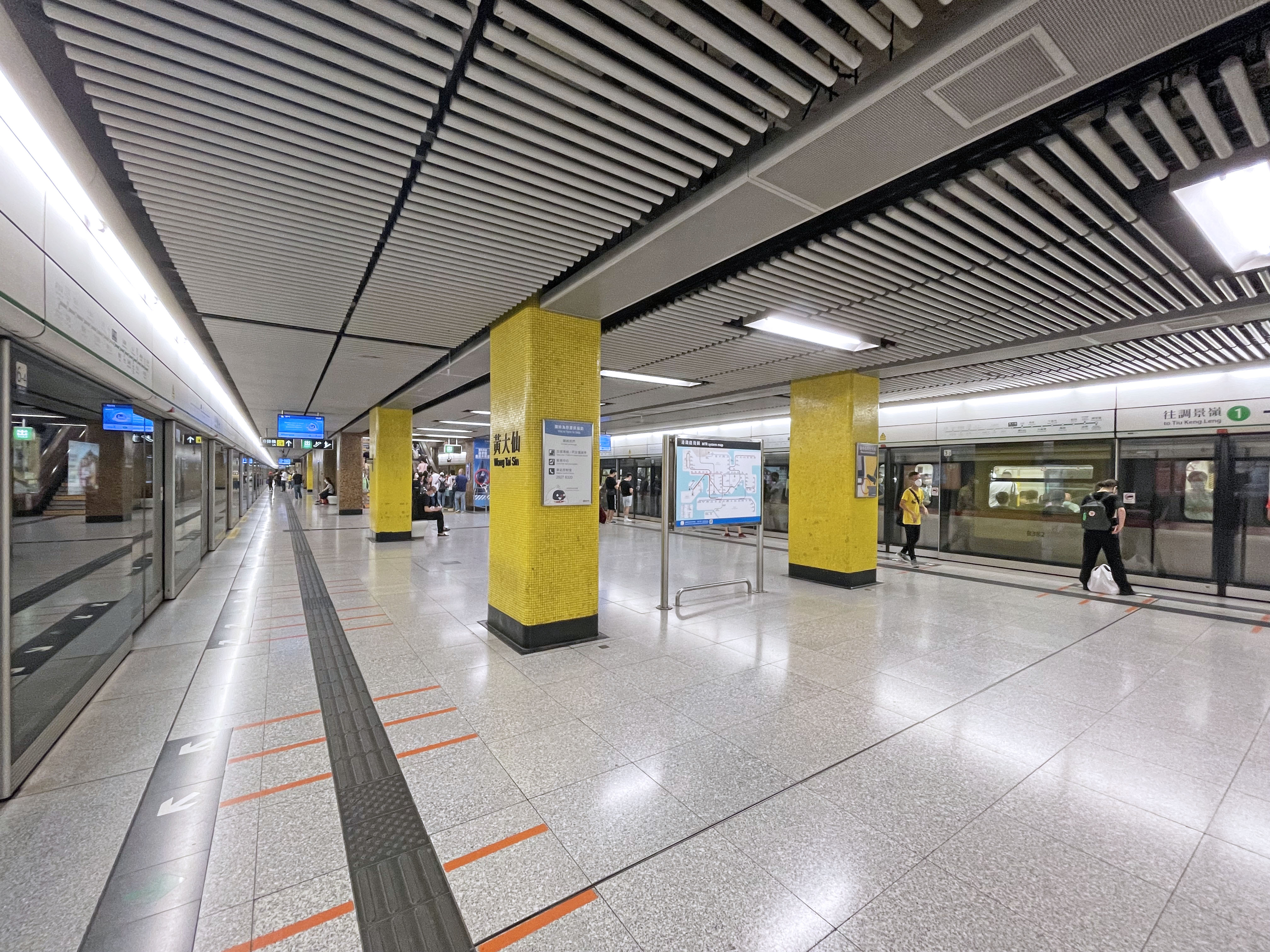
Platforms 1 (right) and 2 (left), 2022

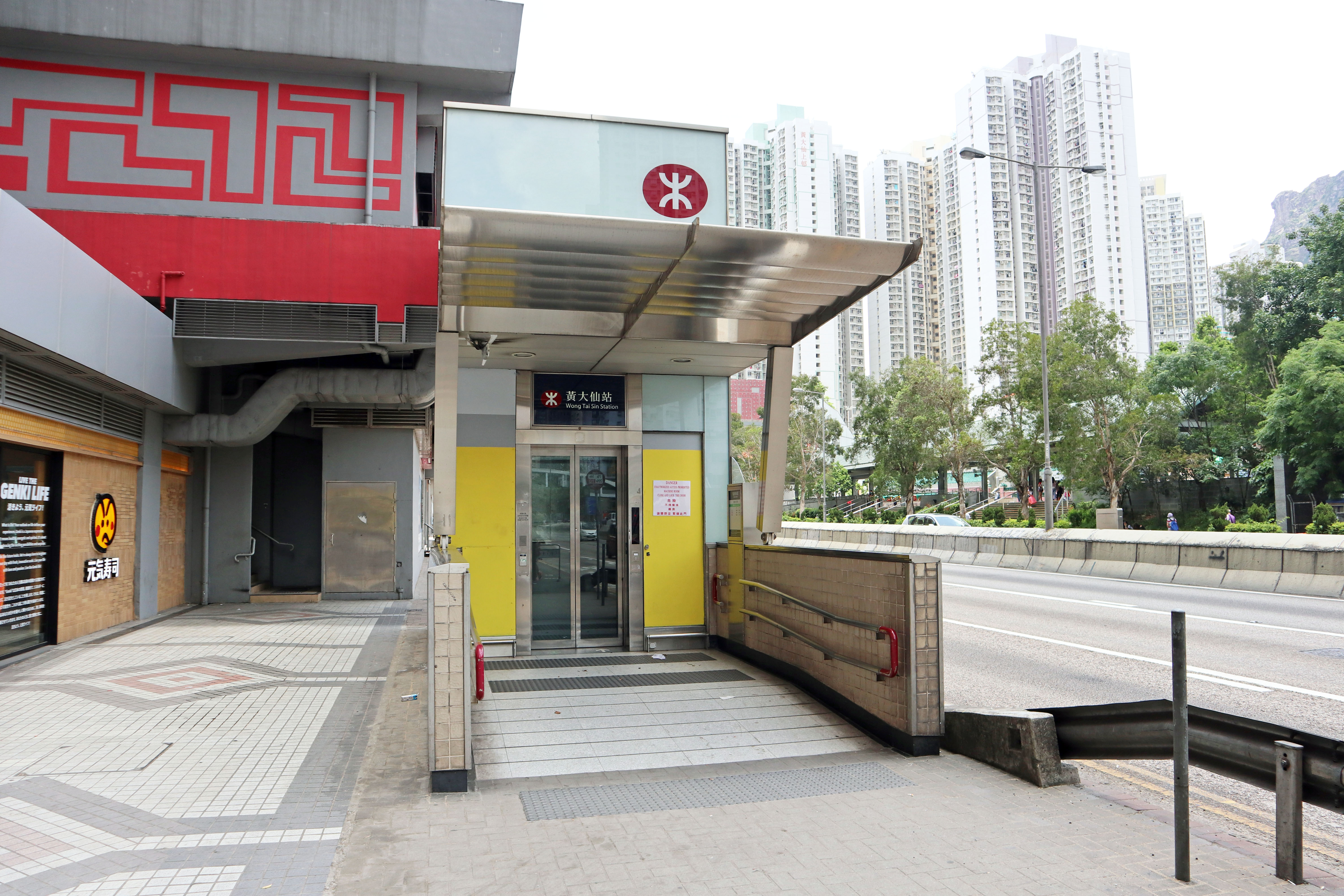
Lift access for Exit D (2020)

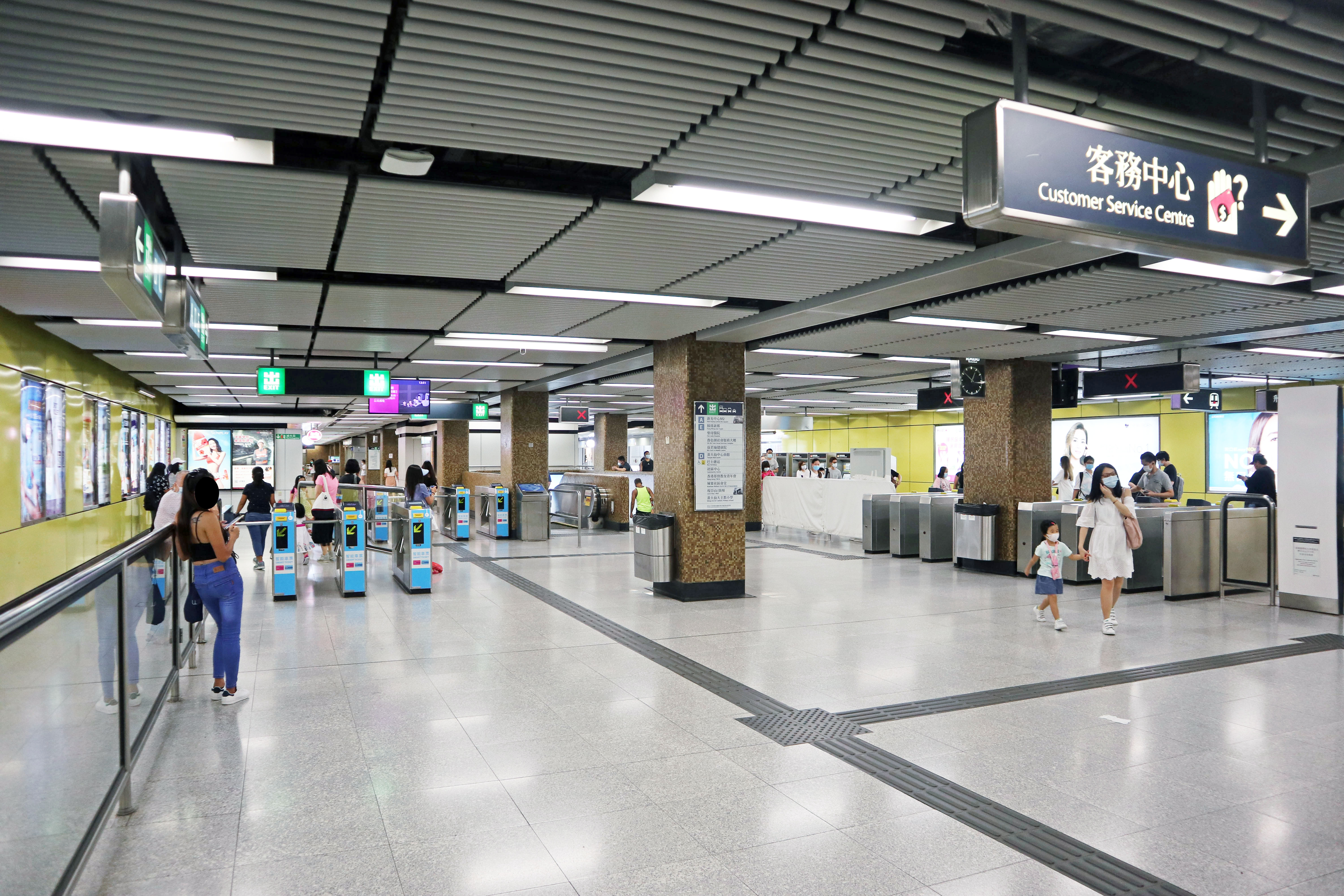
Paid area of the concourse (2020)

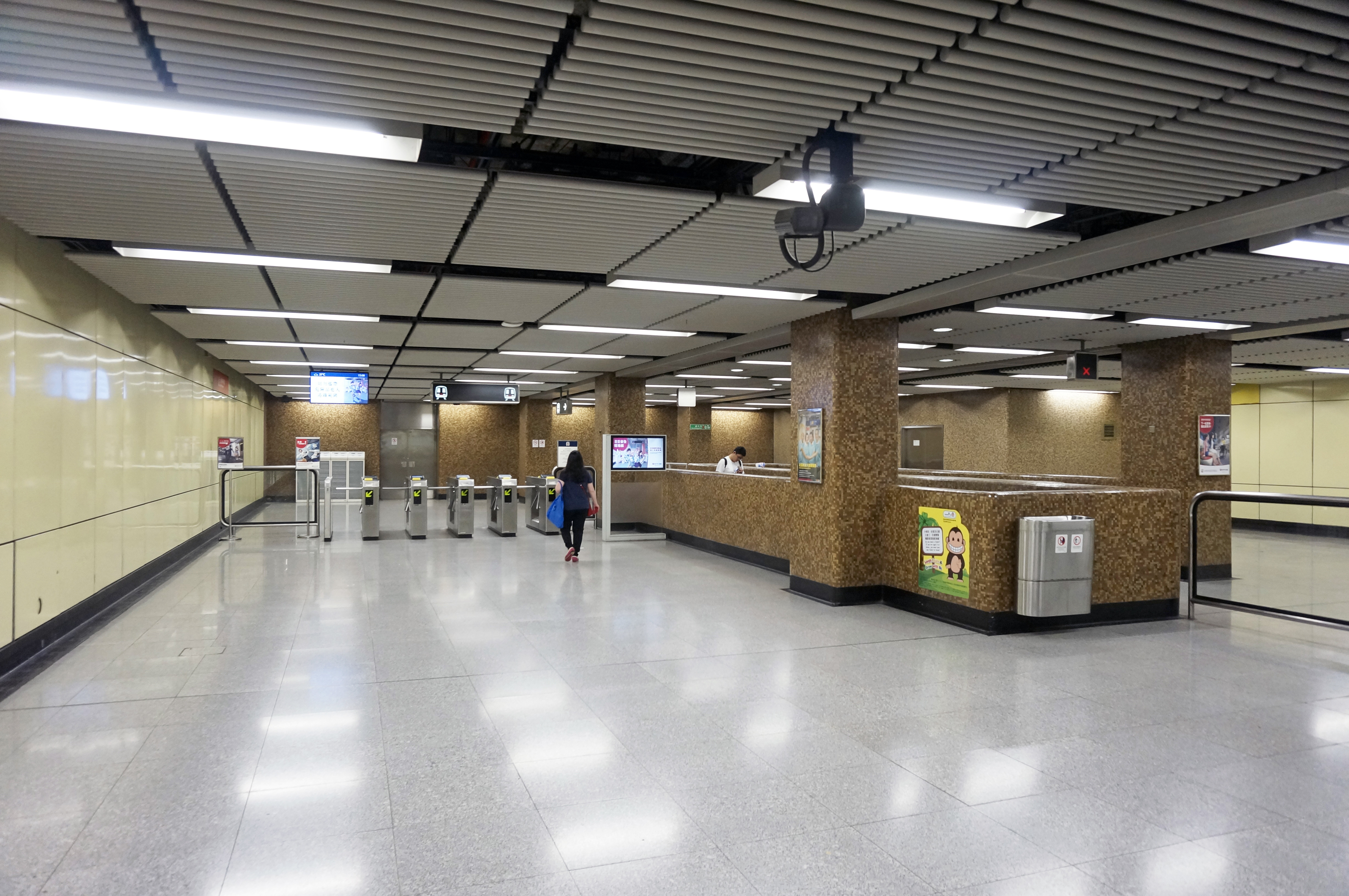
Concourse, near Exit A (2019)

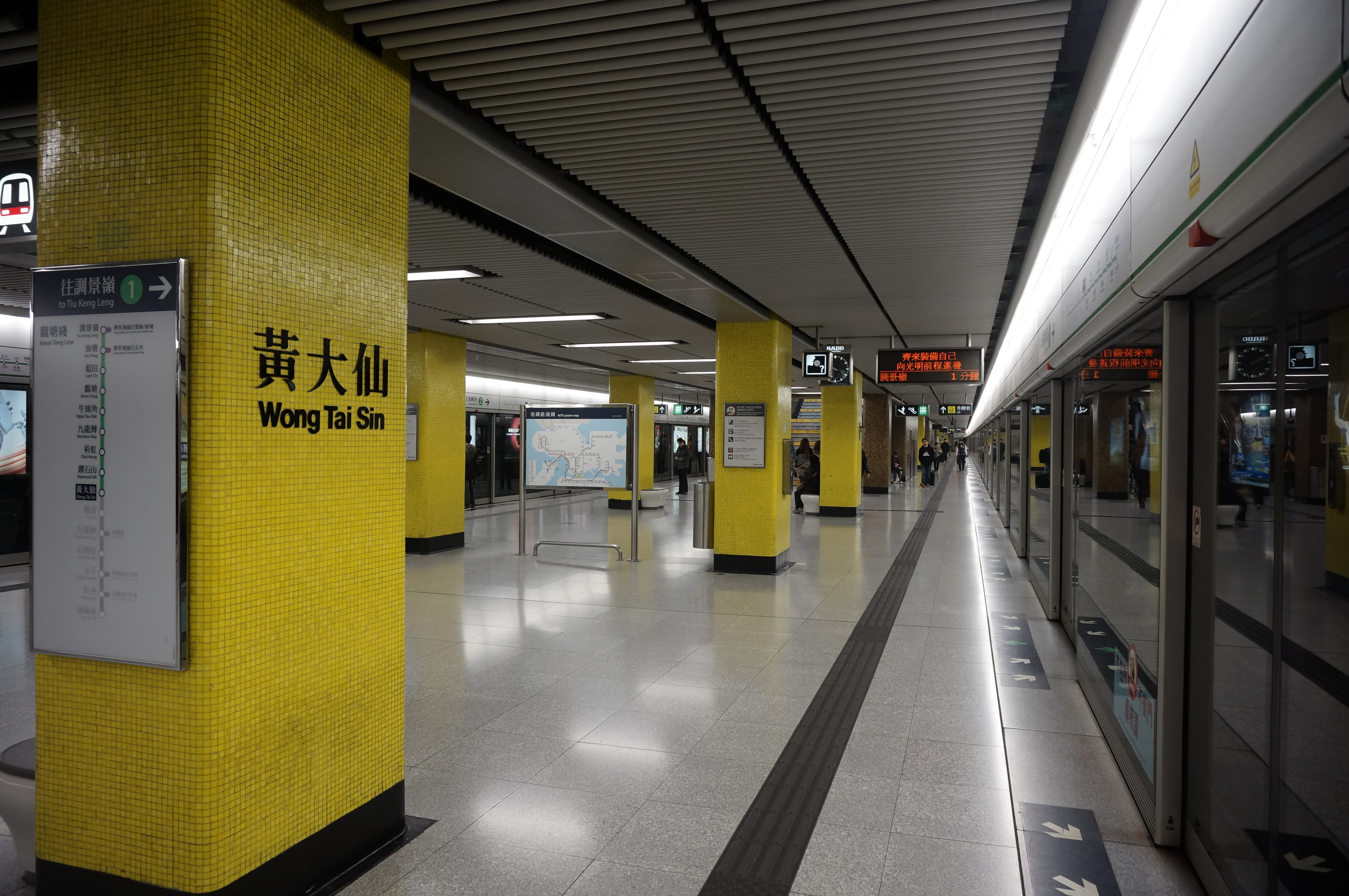
Platform 1 of Wong Tai Sin station (2014)

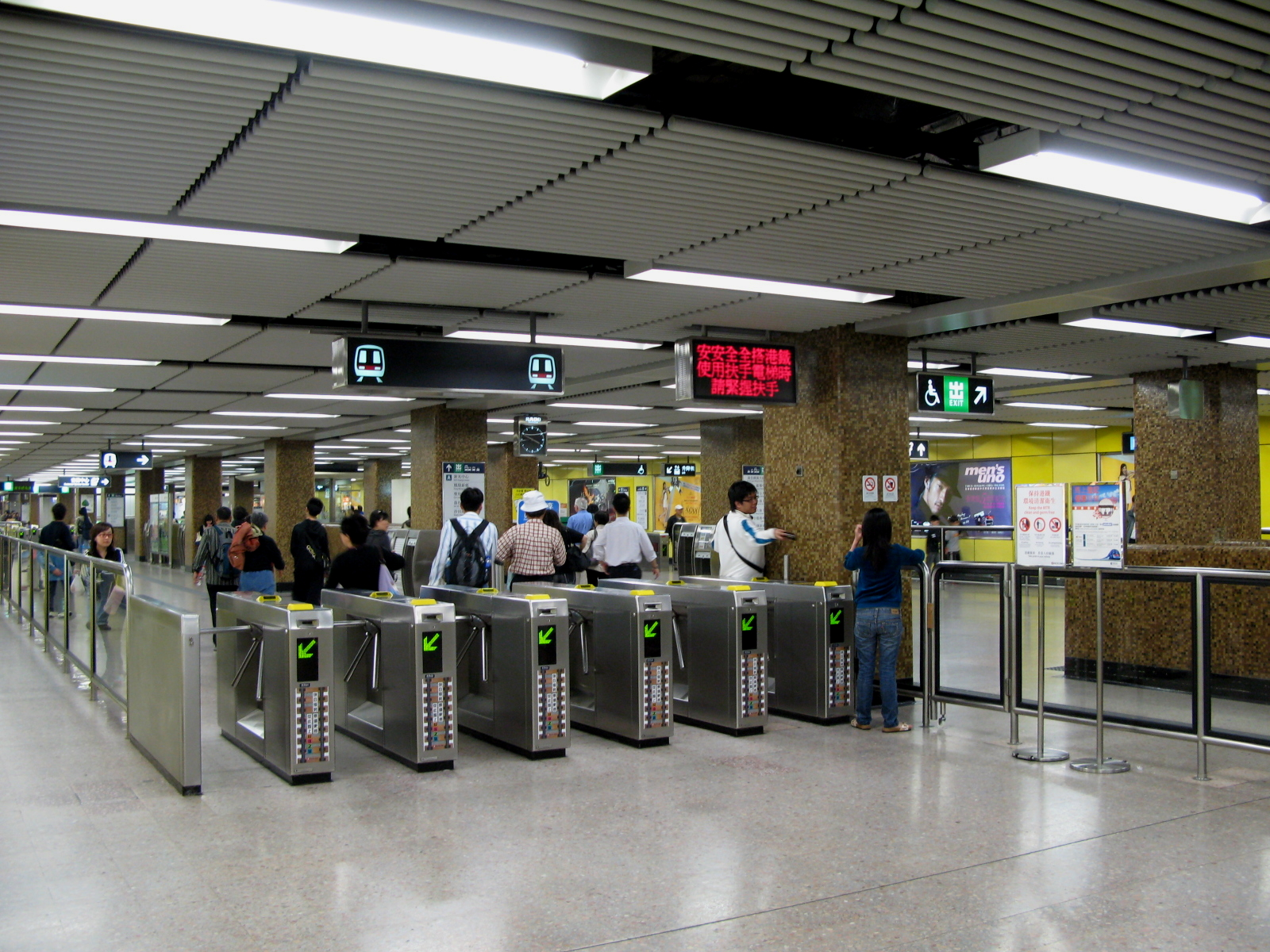
Wong Tai Sin station Concourse (2008)
