= Tak Oi Secondary School =

Secondary school in Hong Kong

- 德愛中學
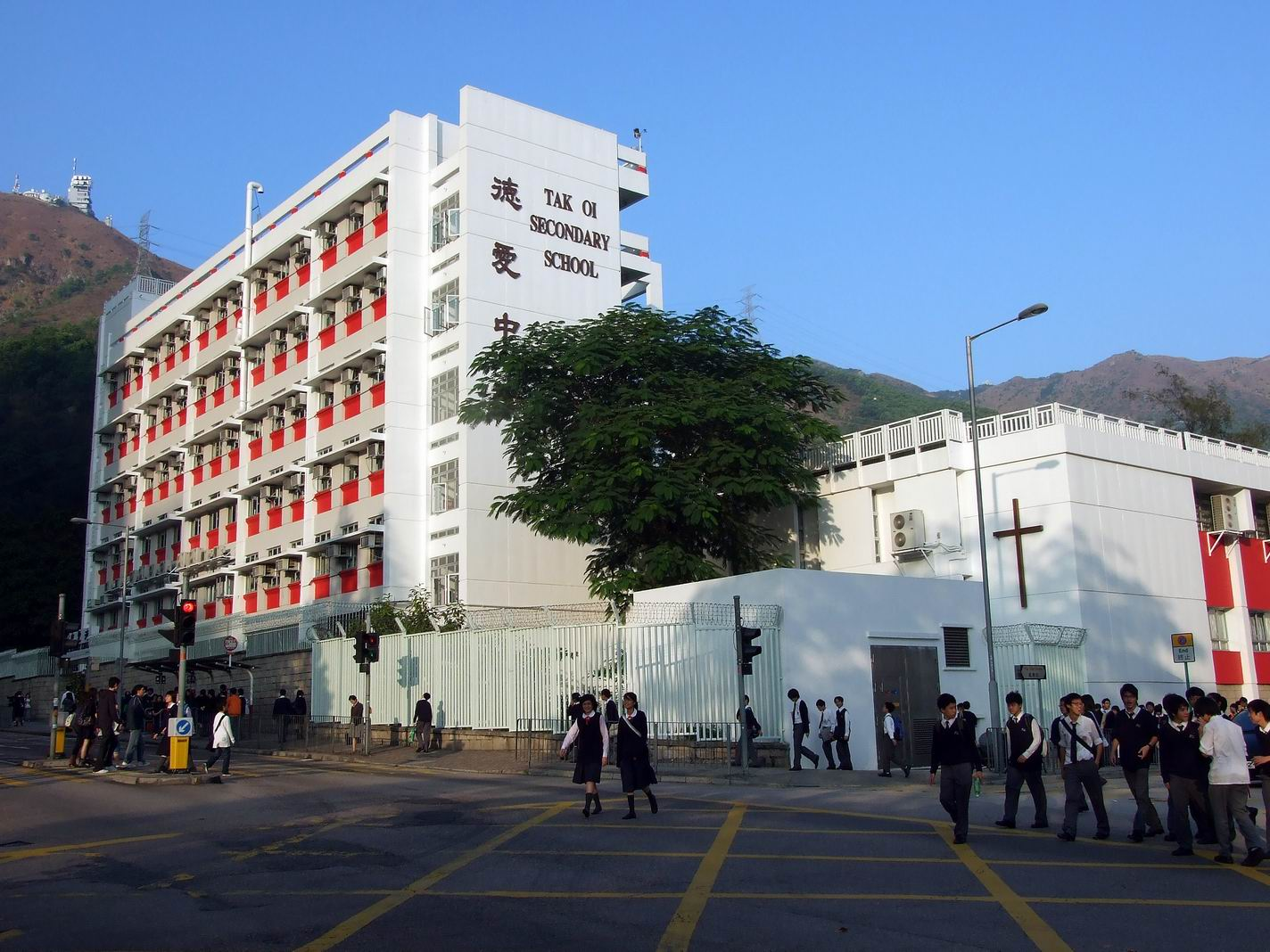

Location
- 8 Tsz Wan Shan Road; Tsz Wan Shan, Kowloon; Hong Kong
- Coordinates: 22°20′51.16″N 114°12′16.61″E

Information
- School type: Aided, Secondary school
- Motto: 誠與愛 (Truth & Love)
- Religious affiliation: Catholic
- Established: c. 1970; 56 years ago
- School district: Wong Tai Sin District
- Supervisor: Sister Rossetti Lau Wai-lan
- Superintendent: Sr Rossetti Lau
- Principal: Ms Natasha Tsang Pui-ki
- Teaching staff: 53
- Grades: Secondary 1 to 6
- Gender: Girls
- Enrollment: approx. 1000
- Language: English
- Area: 5,000 m^{2} (54,000 sq ft)
- Houses: Daisy, Louts, Orchid, Bauhinia
- Colors: Red and white
- Website: www.takoi.edu.hk

Tak Oi Secondary School
- Traditional Chinese: 德愛中學
- Simplified Chinese: 德愛中学
Transcriptions
Standard Mandarin
- Hanyu Pinyin: Dé Ài Zhōngxué
Yue: Cantonese
- Jyutping: dak1 oi3 zung1 hok6

Tak Oi Secondary School (Chinese: 德愛中學), commonly abbreviated as TOSS, is a girls' secondary school situated in Tsz Wan Shan, Wong Tai Sin, Hong Kong. It was established in 1970 by the Missionary Sisters of the Immaculate Conception (MIC).

The school runs 4 classes for each form from F1 to F6 every year.

== Overview ==
The school was named "Tak Oi" (meaning charity) to complete the theological virtues of Faith, Hope, and Love; the former two of which are the names of the other MIC schools in Hong Kong (Tak Sun School and Good Hope School).

The school uses English as the medium of instruction for all subjects except Chinese language, Putonghua, Chinese history, and ethics & religious education.

== History ==
The school was founded in 1970 in response to the needs of the Hong Kong society and the request of Catholic bishop Lawrence Bianchi. At that time, the government was developing the area of Tsz Wan Shan, a district near Wong Tai Sin in East Kowloon. The official opening of the school and the unveiling of a commemorative plaque was officiated by Director of Education John Canning in 1971.
