= Ng Wah Catholic Secondary School =

Secondary school in Hong Kong

- 伍華書院中學部
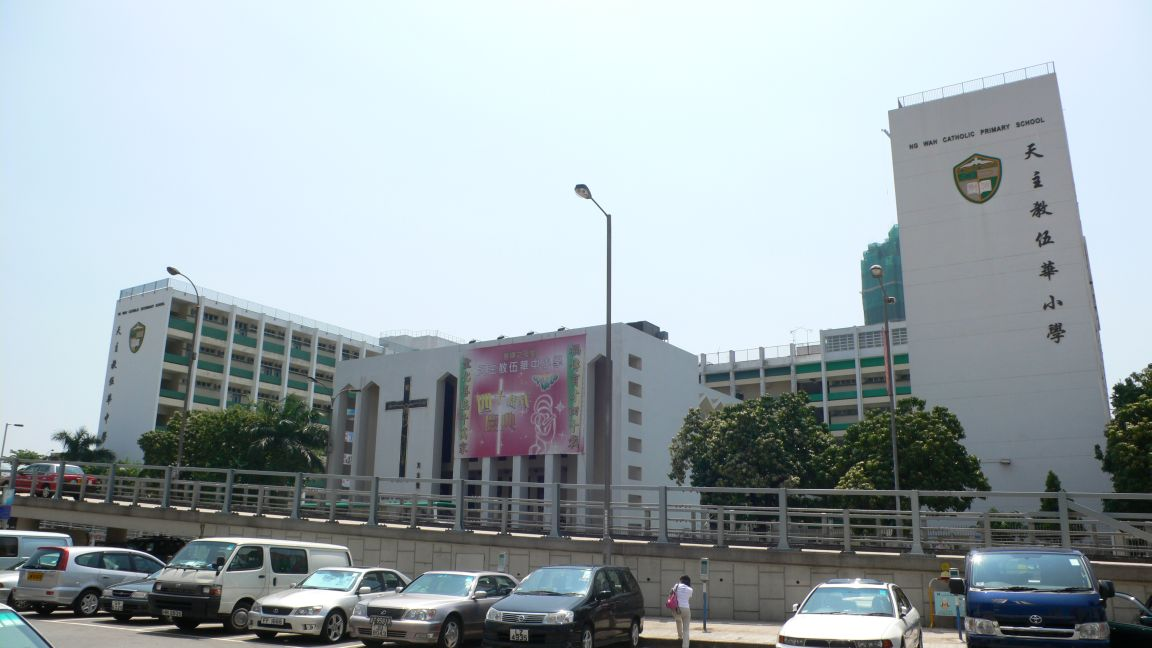
- School campus

Location
- 5 Choi Hung Road, San Po Kong, Wong Tai Sin District, Hong Kong; 22.3330°N 114.1957°E

Information
- Type: Subsidized School
- Motto: In Consilio Sapientia (To think conscientiously and to discern with intelligence)
- Religious affiliation: Catholic
- Established: 1965; 61 years ago
- School district: Wong Tai Sin
- Superintendent: Rev. Renzo Milanese, PIME
- Principal: Ms. Li Yuen Yee
- Faculty: 67 teachers
- Grades: 6
- Colors: Green and Silver
- Affiliation: Catholic Diocese of Hong Kong
- Website: www2.ngwahsec.edu.hk

Ng Wah Catholic Secondary School
- Traditional Chinese: 伍華書院中學部
- Simplified Chinese: 伍华书院中学部
Transcriptions
Standard Mandarin
- Hanyu Pinyin: Wǔ Huá Shūyuàn Zhōngxué Bù
Yue: Cantonese
- Jyutping: ng5 waa4 syu1 jyun6*2 zung1 hok6 bou6

Ng Wah Catholic Secondary School (also referred to as NWC; Chinese: 天主教伍華中學) is a boys' secondary school in San Po Kong which accept both male and female students in the recent years, Wong Tai Sin District, Hong Kong. The school was founded in 1965 by the Catholic Diocese of Hong Kong.

== History ==
Established in 1965 as Sanpokong Catholic College, the school is a government subsidized grammar school for boys, under the sponsorship of the Catholic Diocese of Hong Kong.

Before moving into the new premises, with consent of the school authority of Choi Hung Estate Catholic Secondary School (CHESS), CHECSS was partially used by Ng Wah School in its first year of operation, with a total of 480 junior form students (S1 to S3) in 12 classes.

On 30 March 1966, the present site in San Po Kong were completed and were inaugurated by the then Governor of Hong Kong, Sir David Trench on 14 April 1966.

After a donation by Mr. Ng Ping Kin, an architect and Urban Councillor, the school was renamed Ng Wah College in commemoration of his father, Mr. Ng Wah (Chinese: 伍華). In the late 1970s, the rooftop of the secondary school building was modified and became the 6th floor to accommodate the then expanding student population.

In 1986, three standard classrooms were also in place in the covered playground. Under the School Improvement Project scheme, a new six-storey annex was built connected the primary school building near Choi Hung Rd. in 2000. In the same year, the three classrooms in the covered playground were converted into a bigger multi-purpose Student Activity Room.

Starting from September 2002, the school was renamed as Ng Wah Catholic Secondary School in accordance with the naming system of schools under the sponsorship of the Hong Kong Catholic Diocese.

== Admission ==
A total of 75% of Ng Wah Catholic Secondary School's Form 1 intake is from its feeder school, Ng Wah Catholic Primary School, with 25% from other primary schools

== Motto ==
The school motto is the Latin phrase "IN CONSILIO SAPIENTIA", which means "To think conscientiously and to discern with intelligence" in English.

== Notable alumni ==
The alumni association is called Ng Wah College – Secondary Old Boys Association, Limited.

=== Government ===
- Chan Kin-por, GBS, JP, politician, member of the Legislative Council of Hong Kong (Insurance functional constituency)
- Fred Li Wah-ming, SBS, JP, politician, former member of the Legislative Council of Hong Kong
- Pierre Chan, doctor, politician, member of the Legislative Council of Hong Kong (Medical functional constituency)
- Yu Mun-wa, Retired Chief Superintendent
- Lam Kwok-leung, SBS, CSDSM, retired Commissioner of Hong Kong Correctional Services
- Charlix Wong, JP, retired Director of Accounting Services – The Treasury

=== Business ===
- Algernon Yau, former Chief Executive Officer of Cathay Dragon
- Joseph Wong Chong Chun, Chairman and CEO of Stelux Holdings International Limited (寶光實業)
- Edmond Lee, former director, Société Générale Société Générale
- Ronnie Hui, former CEO of Town Health International Medical Group (康健國際)
- Adrian Tam, General Manager of Sales and Marketing, Octopus Cards Limited
- Kam Ming, American investment banker and political philosopher

=== Arts and culture ===
- Comfort Chan Kwong-wing, music composer.
- Ng Chi-Sum (吳志森), presenter.
- William Chak Wai-lim, actor.
- Chris Yeung, Chairperson of Hong Kong Journalists Association
- Mung Wai Leong, Broadcaster of RTHK
- Hinry Lau, Singer-Songwriter and Music Producer
- Johnny Hui, presenter, Cable News Hong Kong
- Patrick Suen, Hong Kong columnist and film critic
- Jeremy Lau, Hong Kong musician, singer and member of Mirror
- Michael CT Lam, Hong Kong baritone opera singer

=== Academia ===
- Daniel Chiu Wah Tsang, professor, Department of Civil and Environmental Engineering, The Hong Kong Polytechnic University
- Tony Tse, Programme Director of Industry Partnerships, The Hong Kong Polytechnic University
- Ricardo Mak King Sang, Director of Public Examinations, Hong Kong Examinations and Assessment Authority
- Kuo Yong Hong, Assistant Professor, Department of Industrial and Manufacturing Systems Engineering, The University of Hong Kong
- Fung Wai-wah, President of the Hong Kong Professional Teachers' Union
- Yung Yau, Professor of Urban Studies, Department of Sociology and Social Policy, Lingnan University

=== Sports ===
- Lai Yiu Cheong, footballer of Metro Gallery FC
- Lam Hin Ting, footballer of Hong Kong Premier League club R&F
- Chan Kwong Ho, footballer of Hong Kong Premier League club Southern
- Cheung Wai Hong, professional basketball player, Hong Kong A1 Division Championship Tycoon Basketball Team

=== Others ===
- Ken Leung Kam-wing, businessman, one of the hostages in Manila hostage crisis.
