= Rhythm Garden =

Home Ownership Scheme housing estate in Hong Kong

Coordinates: 22.3363°N 114.202397°E

- Traditional Chinese: 采頤花園
- Simplified Chinese: 采颐花园
Transcriptions
Standard Mandarin
- Hanyu Pinyin: Cǎi Yí Huāyuán
Yue: Cantonese
- Jyutping: coi2 ji4 faa1 jyun4*2

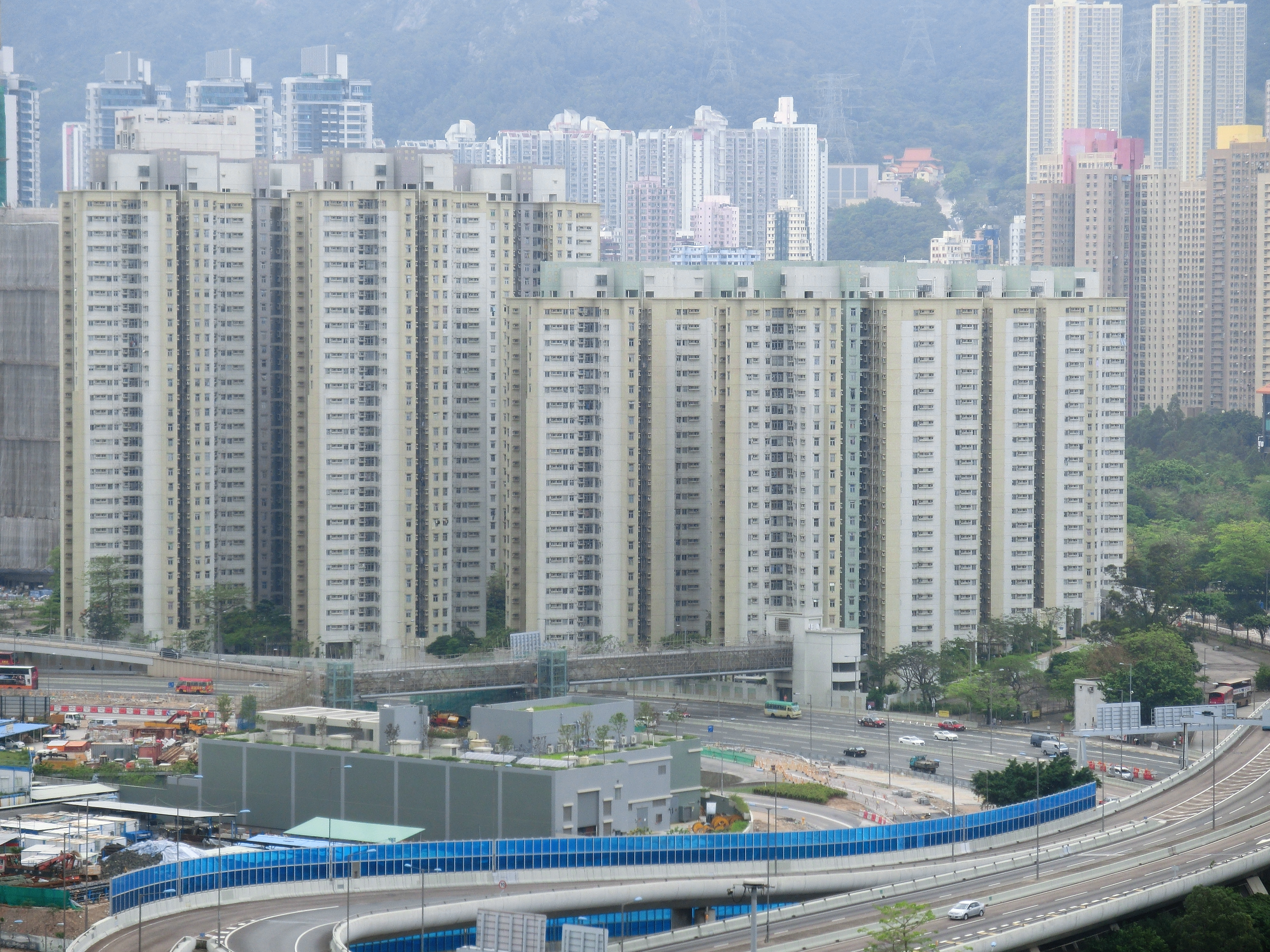
Rhythm Garden

Rhythm Garden (Chinese: 采頤花園) is a Home Ownership Scheme and Private Sector Participation Scheme court in San Po Kong, Wong Tai Sin District, Kowloon, Hong Kong, jointly developed by the Hong Kong Housing Authority and New World Development. Formerly a part of the site of former British Forces Overseas Hong Kong's Blackdown Barracks, the court has 12 blocks completed in 2000.

== Houses ==
Name	Type	Completion
Block 1	PSPS	2000
Block 2	PSPS	2000
Block 3	PSPS	2000
Block 4	PSPS	2000
Block 5	PSPS	2000
Block 6	PSPS	2000
Block 7	PSPS	2000
Block 8	PSPS	2000
Block 9	PSPS	2000
Block 10	PSPS	2000
Block 11	PSPS	2000
Block 12	PSPS	2000
