= Choi Hung Estate Catholic Secondary School =

Boys' school in Wong Tai Sin, Hong Kong

- 彩虹邨天主教英文中學
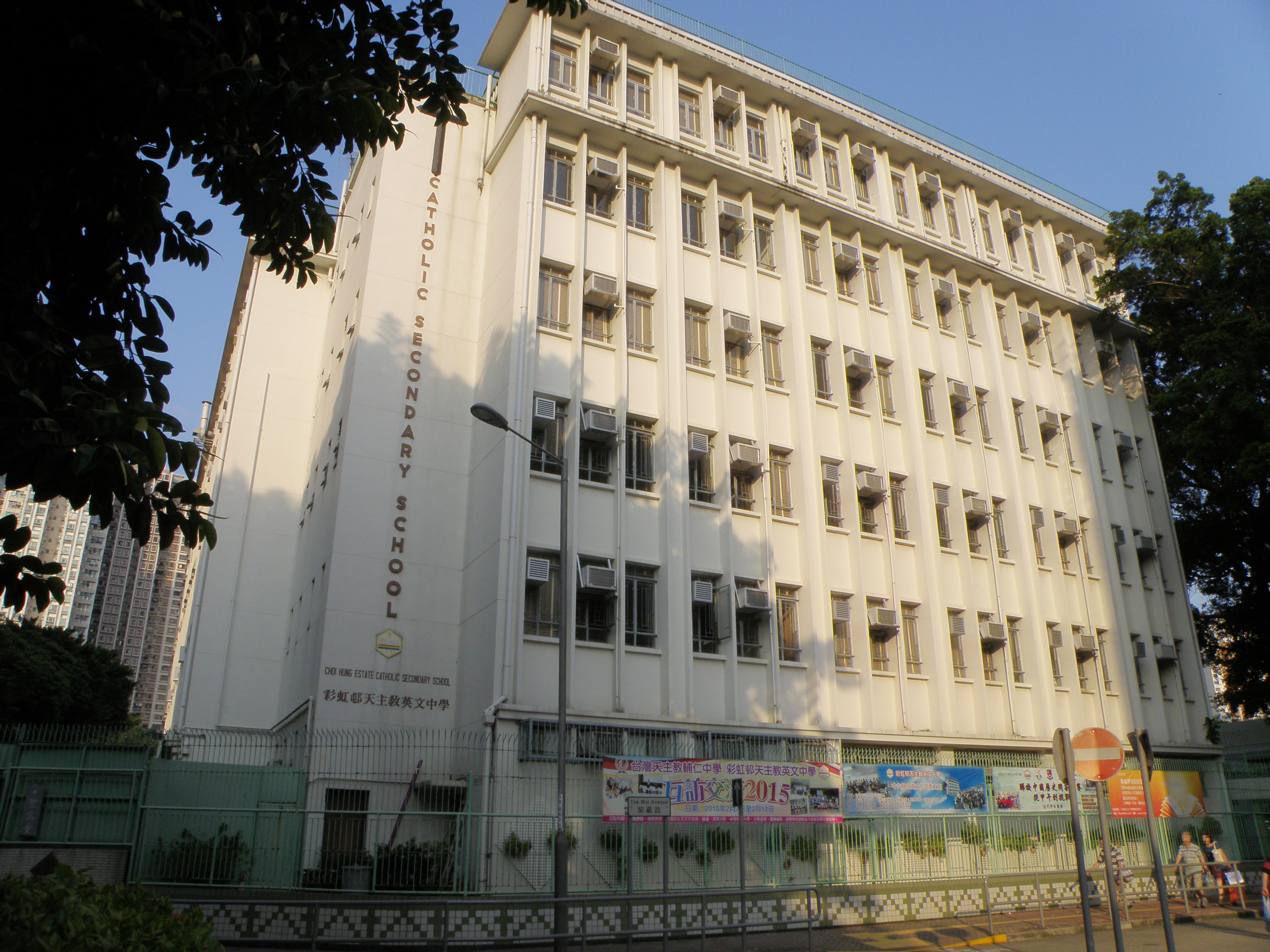
- Choi Hung Estate Catholic Secondary School

Location
- 1 Tse Wai Avenue, Kowloon, Hong Kong
- Coordinates: 22°20′6″N 114°12′24″E

Information
- Type: Subsidised School
- Motto: SPES SALUS (Latin: Hope and Salvation)
- Religious affiliation: Roman Catholic Diocese of Hong Kong
- Established: February 28, 1965; 61 years ago
- Founder: Roman Catholic Diocese of Hong Kong
- Status: Open
- School district: Wong Tai Sin
- Principal: Ms. He Jia xin
- Staff: 80
- Grades: 6
- Gender: Male
- Age: 13 to 19
- Classrooms: 24
- Nickname: 彩天
- Website: 彩虹邨天主敎英文中學 Choi Hung Estate Catholic Secondary School

Choi Hung Estate Catholic Secondary School
- Traditional Chinese: 彩虹邨天主敎英文中學
- Simplified Chinese: 彩虹邨天主敎英文中学
- Literal meaning: Choi Hung Estate Catholic Church English-language Secondary School
Transcriptions
Standard Mandarin
- Hanyu Pinyin: Cǎihóng Cūn Tiānzhǔ Jiào Yīngwén Zhōngxué
Yue: Cantonese
- Jyutping: coi2 hung4 cyun1 tin1 zyu2 gaau3 jing1 man4 zung1 hok6

Choi Hung Estate Catholic Secondary School (Chinese: 彩虹邨天主敎英文中學) is a boy's secondary school situated in Choi Hung Estate, Wong Tai Sin, Hong Kong. Established on 28 February 1965 by Roman Catholic Diocese of Hong Kong.

== History ==
=== 1960s ===
School enrolled new students at Pui Shing Catholic Secondary School from March to August, and received them fees at Wong Tai Sin Catholic Primary School. In the early year, there were only 440 boys in 11 classes from form 1 to form 3, and 14 teachers. In first academic year, school shared its school building with Sanpokong Catholic Secondary School. On 28 February 1965, school was opened and inaugurated by Bishop Bianchi. 1967, there were already 847 boys in 22 classes from form 1 to form 5.

== Facilities ==
Furnished Classrooms First aid room General office English society room English corner Catholic chapel Science lab Physics lab Gymnasium Social worker room Art room Library Playground Toilets Running tracks

== Motto ==
SPES SALUS (Latin: Hope and Salvation)

== Alumni ==
- Lok Ying kwan, actor.
- Tsang Kin Fong, footballer.
- Anskar Leung Yu Hung, Clinical Professor, Li Ka Shing Faculty of Medicine, University of Hong Kong.
